= Zoryan Shkiryak =

Ukrainian politician (born 1970)

- Зорян Шкіряк
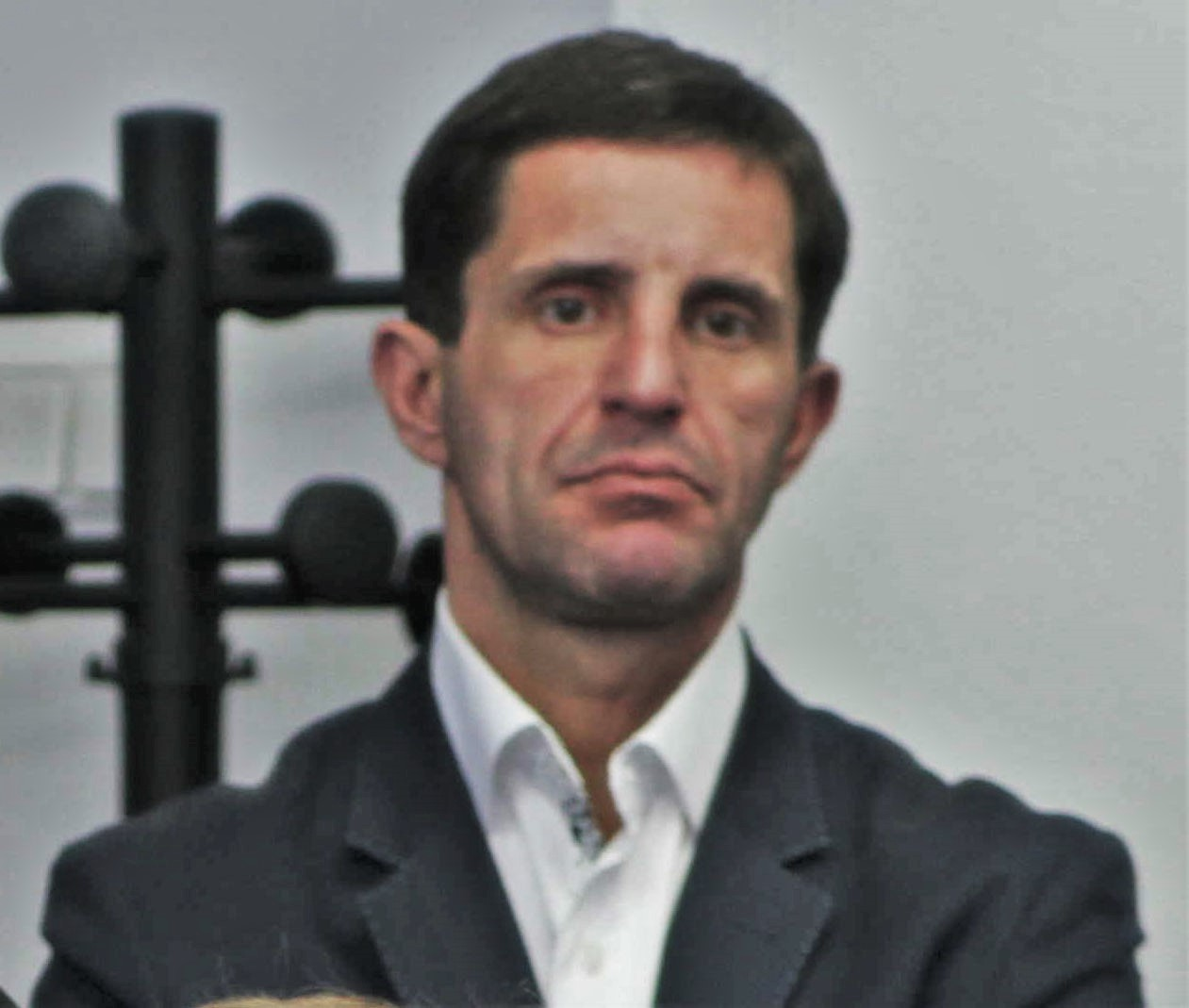
- Shkiryak in 2012.

Head of the State Emergency Service of Ukraine
- In office 25 March 2015 – 14 May 2015
- President: Petro Poroshenko
- Prime Minister: Arseniy Yatsenyuk
- Preceded by: Serhiy Bochkovsky
- Succeeded by: Mykola Chechotkin

Chairman of the Social Christian Party
- In office 21 August 2010 – 15 March 2014
- Preceded by: Anton Ruzhitsky
- Succeeded by: Konstantin Sokolov

Advisor to the Minister of Internal Affairs
- In office 12 June 2014 – 25 March 2015
- In office 19 May 2015 – 2021

Personal details
- Born: 14 November 1970 Uzhhorod, Ukrainian SSR, Soviet Union
- Party: Reforms and Order Party (2002-2005); Our Ukraine (2005-2009); Social Christian Party (2010-2014); Independent (2014-2015); People's Front (2014)

Zoryan Nestorovych Shkiryak (Ukrainian: Зорян Несторович Шкіряк, born 14 November 1970) is a Ukrainian politician, businessman, and civil servant who served as the acting Head of the State Emergency Service of Ukraine (DSNS) from 2014 to 2015 under Petro Poroshenko after Serhiy Bochkovsky was dismissed due to allegations of corruption. Prior to this, Shkiryak was a politician in the city of Kyiv and was an advisor to the Minister of Internal Affairs from 2014 to 2021. He was also a candidate in the 2014 Ukrainian presidential election as an independent, but withdrew early, although he was still listed on the ballot, leading him to place last.

== Early life ==
Shkiryak was born on 14 November 1970 in the city of Uzhhorod, which was then part of the Ukrainian SSR of the Soviet Union. He was born into a well-known family of doctors. His mother, Zoreslava Antonivna Shkiryak-Nyzhnyk, was a doctor and a professor at the P.L. Shupyk National Medical Academy of Postgraduate Education. His father, Nestor Mykolayovych Shkiryak, was a phthisiatrician. Zoryan has one brother, Anton, a military engineer who served as a major in the anti-aircraft missile forces and worked in Uzhorod. According to the book "The Elite of Medicine of Ukraine", Zoryan's cousins were Yulii and Mykhailo were both members of Avgustyn Voloshyn's government when he was President of the Carpatho-Ukraine, and were later repressed. Zoryan moved to Kyiv in 1973.

In 1988, Shkiryak began his career in Volyn, worked as an orderly at the Central District Hospital in Liuboml. After a little less than a year, he left to do his mandatory service in the Soviet Air Defense Forces. He was stationed with military unit No. 11038 and was on active duty due to guarding or defending a strategic facility of national importance. After completing two years in the army, the Soviet Union collapsed, and he began working as a manager at the "Ukrainian Language and Information Centre". After two years there, in 1993, he became the manager of the company "Silex". Shkiryak only spent a year in the post, though, as he left to become the Deputy General Director for Marketing at ATM in 1994. He stayed there for another six years before leaving again to become Deputy General Director of the LLC "Tiras" in 2000, spending three years there until 2003. After leaving Tiras in 2003, he became General Director of LLC "Svetlozor". He spent another two years there until 2005. Later, in 2006, he became executive director of the company "Tilly-2002", a position he held for four years until 2010. Since 2009, he has been president of the analytical centre "New Kyiv".

== Political career ==
=== 2002-2014: Early career in Kyiv ===
In 2002, Shkiryak first entered politics, becoming a deputy of the Shevchenkivskyi District Council in Kyiv. In the council, he was head of the parliamentary faction of the Reforms and Order Party, and was deputy chair of the Standing Committee on Youth Policy, Humanitarian Issues, and Spiritual Revival. While still a deputy, in 2005, he became a member of the newly formed Our Ukraine party and was elected as a member of the council of the Kyiv city branch of Our Ukraine. His term in the Shevchenkivskyi District council ended in 2006. Afterwards, he was elected to the Kyiv City Council during its 5th convocation as a member of "Our Ukraine", a position he held for two years, until 2008.After leaving the council, he also left Our Ukraine on 1 July 2009. Afterwards, he founded the civic association "New Kyiv". A year later, on 21 August 2010, he was elected chairman of the minor Social Christian Party (SHP) during its 7th extraordinary party congress. 50 of the 51 delegates voted for him. After he was elected, Shkiryak said the party would participate in upcoming local council elections with new members from his "New Kyiv", mainly the Kyiv City Council elections. He also stated that SHP would be rebranded, but that it would remain loyal to its core values of European integration, social equality, and developing society based on Christian morality.

In preparation for the upcoming 2012 Ukrainian parliamentary elections, Shkiryak announced that the SHP would be joining the electoral bloc Batkivshchyna – United Opposition. During the announcement, he said that the SHP had always fought against the then Ukrainian president, Viktor Yanukovych, whom he called illegitimate, and said that they were part of the "Committee for Resistance to Dictatorship". On 15 March 2014, he was succeeded in the role of chairman during the 8th congress, which elected Konstantin Sokolov as the party leader.

=== 2013-2014: Euromaidan ===
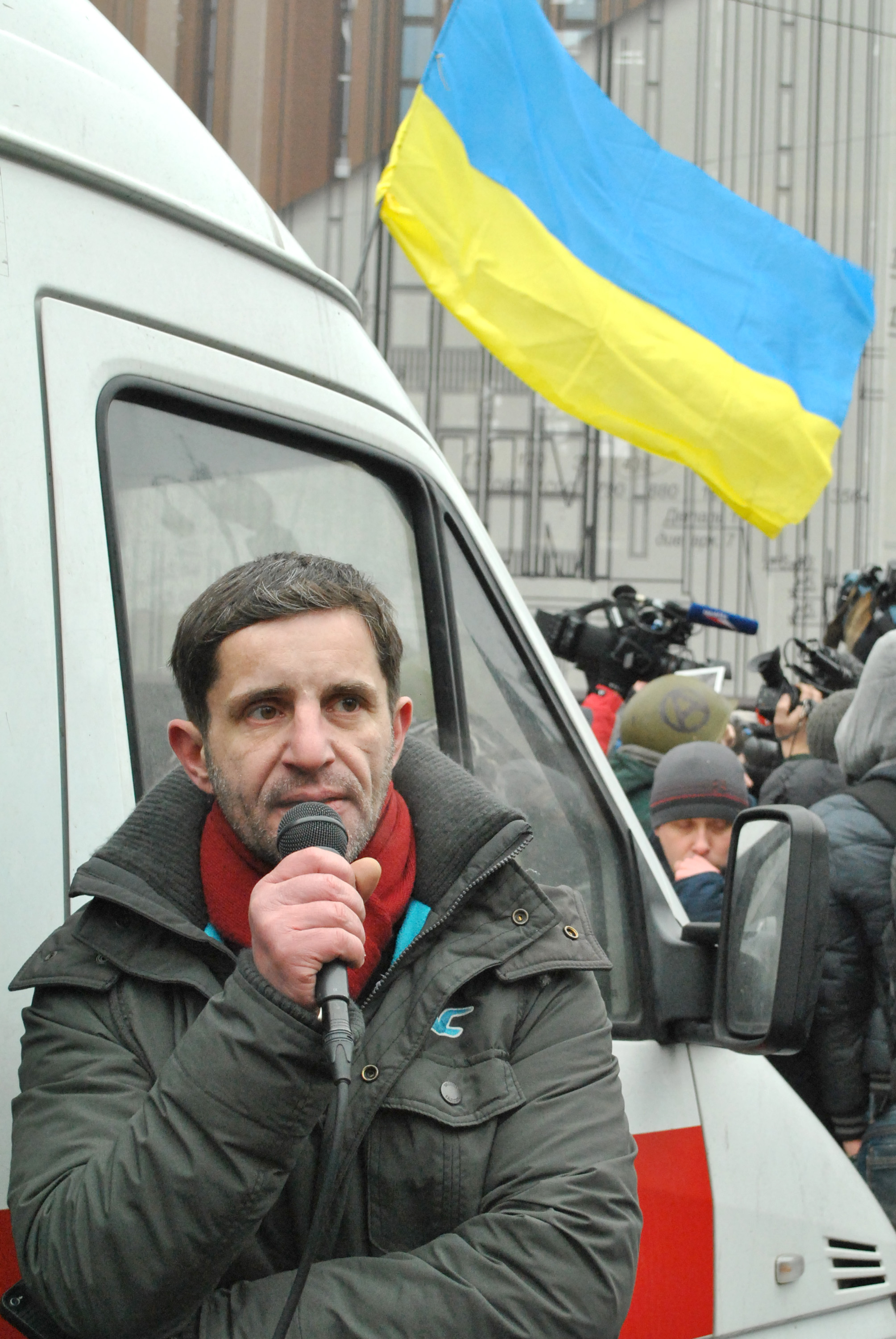
Shkiryak during the Euromaidan protests in 2014.

Shkiryak rose to national prominence as one of the main organisers of Euromaidan, with his responsibilities being to prevent clashes. In late November 2013, he reported on the riot police clearing the squares, which he called a "brutal clearing", claiming they used grenades and tear gas against peaceful protesters. However, he said he refused to leave the main Independence Square, together with a small group of activists, which included Andriy Shevchenko and Oksana Prodan. After the crackdown, he went with other activists to the Shevchenkivskyi police station to help release detainees, of whom there were 33 at the time. As he later stated, he called the 1 December 2013 protests the "point of no return" and said that the protest began to get stronger than the Orange Revolution. He then participated in the follow-up 11 December protests, and said he prevented an assault by the police, who were trying to push through to protesters who had occupied the Kyiv City Council building since 1 December. During a follow-up interview on the day of the protests, he said he predicted Viktor Yanukovych would leave office soon and be put on trial, and affirmed that the opposition would not compromise because Yanukovych was making no concessions. After the organisation Maidan People's Union was formed on 22 December, he was named to its council. In early January 2014, at a briefing within the National Resistance Headquarters in Kyiv, he claimed that the Ukrainian authorities were trying to prepare talking points for the Euromaidan activists in Kharkiv, which he said was an attempt to split the protest and discredit the opposition.

=== 2014: Election runs ===
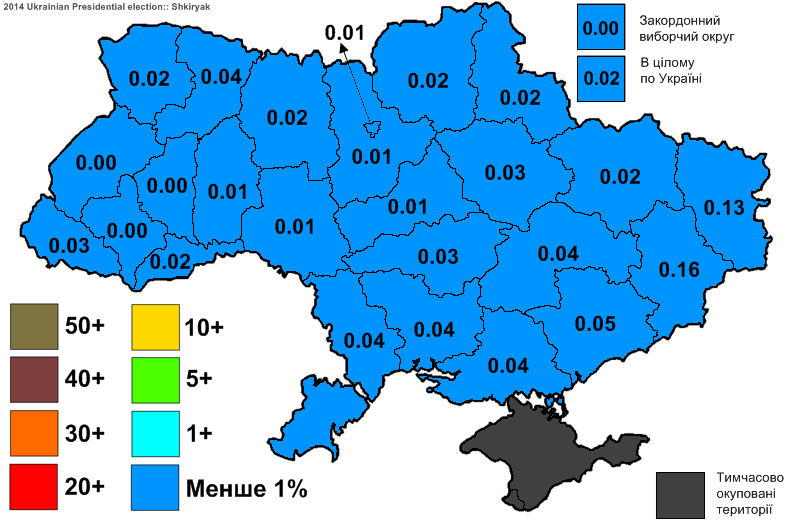
Map of electoral support for Shkiryak during the 2014 presidential election. He did best in the Donbas.

In March 2014, Shkiryak was listed as an independent candidate for the upcoming snap 2014 Ukrainian presidential election, based on registration with the CEC. On 10 May 2014, he announced his withdrawal from the election during a televised debate. He asked that his name not be counted on the ballots, since he did not submit the documents in time for his withdrawal to be officially counted. He did not call for support for another candidate, and said he was instead heading to eastern Ukraine to be a civil activist. Since he was still technically in the race due to him not submitting documents, the CEC announced in late May, when the votes were counted, that he received 5,021 votes, or 0.02% of the vote, putting him in last place among the candidates. He received the highest support in Donetsk Oblast and Luhansk Oblast (among the parts that were still controlled by the Ukrainian government due to the ongoing War in the Donbas).

He later ran in the 2014 Ukrainian parliamentary elections for electoral district No. 217 (Kyiv) with the People's Front, before also withdrawing early. This time, he called on his supporters to vote for Andriy Biletsky, the then Commander of the Azov Battalion, and for all pro-European candidates in districts to unite around a single candidate for each district to prevent the opposition from entering parliament. On 12 June 2014, the Minister of Internal Affairs, Arsen Avakov, appointed Shkiryak as his advisor. His specific policy area was the evacuation of civilians and the Anti-Terrorist Operation Zone (ATO) as part of the War in the Donbas. During this time, he became known for his heavily pro-Ukrainian stance and often provocative statements. Immediately after becoming an advisor, he said that some militants from the LPR and DPR were trying to surrender, but they were being executed if they did. He also said that he was working with the ministry on plans to help evacuate people from the ATO, with people in it being informed about locations and ways out. He then claimed in July that local residents were beginning to kill the militants, and said that most of the dead militants were Russian citizens, calling it an internal armed resistance. He said this was caused by dissatisfaction over incidents of shooting civilians after the crash of the Malaysia Airlines Flight 17. A month later, in August, he claimed that the Russian Armed Forces were participating in the War in the Donbas and were launching a "full-scale military invasion" through several directions and controlling and dispersing the militants. Later, in October, he called for Russian President Vladimir Putin to be tried in a criminal case for the genocide of the Ukrainian people.

=== 2015: Acting Head of the DSNS ===
On 25 March 2015, Shkiryak was appointed as acting Head of the State Emergency Service of Ukraine (DSNS) after the previous leader, Serhiy Bochkovsky, was arrested live on air and later dismissed. After being appointed, he announced that a total lustration of the DSNS would begin. In accordance with this, more than 300 employees were dismissed two days later, on 27 March, saying that a total renewal needed to happen given the DSNS's importance due to the War in the Donbas. A few days later, he said the Department of Internal Security and Anti-Corruption in the State Emergency Service would be completely reorganised with a new leadership, and began dismissing the previous top leadership across the DSNS. In early April, he also dismissed the heads of the main departments of the DSNS in more than ten departments, alongside 22 deputy heads of regional departments of the DSNS for state supervision and fire inspection. By late April, he said he had signed over 1,300 lustration checks to terminate employees since taking over the DSNS.

==== Nepal evacuation and resignation ====
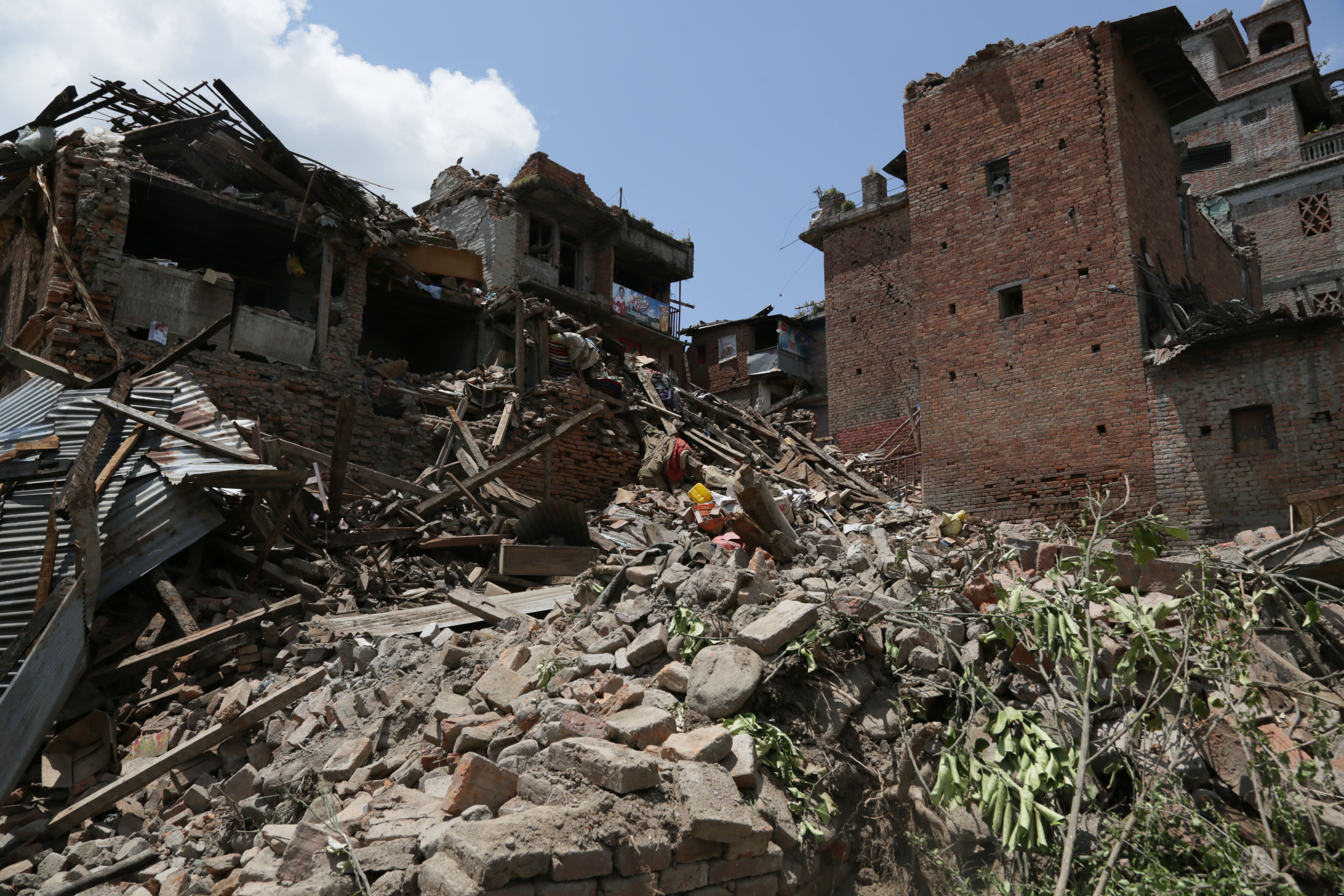
The events of the evacuation of Ukrainian civilians during the April 2015 Nepal earthquake (pictured here) led to Shkiryak's dismissal as Head of the DSNS.

After the 25 April 2015 Nepal earthquake, the president, Petro Poroshenko, instructed a full evacuation of all Ukrainian citizens, which Shkiryak led. He said the Ministry of Defense's aircraft, an Il-76, was ready and was waiting in Kathmandu, Nepal's capital, to land. Four days later, on 29 April, he said the Il-76 had been loaded with DSNS rescuers and doctors, but said that the delay in landing the aircraft in Kathmandu was long, and Shkiryak said they might have to land in Delhi. At the time, the Prime Minister, Arseniy Yatsenyuk, announced 7 million hryvnias for the evacuation operation. The Il-76 finally left Kyiv on 30 April, carrying DSNS personnel alongside Shkiryak and his partner for a day-and-a-half evacuation trip. Upon arriving in Delhi, the Nepalese government said the plane did not have a landing clearance to go into Kathmandu until 3 May, and after its pump regulator failed, the people in the Il-76 went to Kathmandu on a regular, scheduled flight. Upon arriving in Nepal, Shkiryak said that the scheduled flight had been allowed to land, but that it had been damaged on its way from Delhi. It was confirmed by Nepal that the plane would leave on 5 May, with 76 Ukrainians and 11 foreigners, although it was delayed again when a tyre burst in Delhi. It finally arrived at the Boryspil Airport in Kyiv on 7 May, costing about 7 million hryvnias for the entire operation.

Although the operation succeeded, it was heavily criticised nationwide in Ukraine due to its high costs. Politicians criticised Shkiryak for taking his partner with him on a state expense, with Shkiryak saying she went as a volunteer who was knowledgeable about "eastern practices" and the psychology of people, and later said she had paid her own fare. After arriving in Boryspil, he admitted the evacuation was a "slip", but blamed the control centre of the defense ministry for not providing clear instructions, and said he would not be made a scapegoat because the DSNS had earlier offered a less clostly plan that was not used. In response, the anti-corruption committee of the Verkhovna Rada asked the Cabinet of Ministers to check whether the money was spent in a reasonable manner, with Boryslav Bereza calling the trip a "PR exercise". However, Viktor Chumak, another MP, said the responsibility for the trip lay with the Cabinet of Ministers, with Avakov saying that the defense ministry was responsible and that there no complaints about Shkiryak. Regardless, on 12 May, it was already reported that the Cabinet would likely remove Shkiryak early as Head of the DSNS, with an administration source saying that it was because of the trip and his "inability to match his new status with his behaviour". Later that day, Shkiryak, in a briefing, said he had asked to be relieved from the post, saying that his time in the post was temporary and professionals needed to replace him. On 14 May, the Cabinet officially dismissed him.

=== 2015-2021: Later career as advisor ===
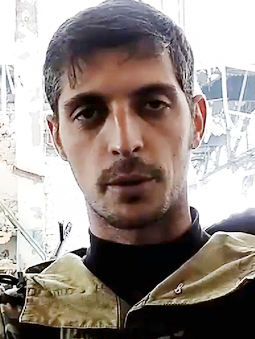
During his time in office, Shkiryak was accused of having a role in the killing of the DPR militant, Mikhail Tolstykh ("Givi"), by both the DPR and Russian media. In the case of the latter, it became a Ukrainian meme due to Russia 24 saying two people were involved: Zoryan and Shkiryak.

After he was dismissed, it was confirmed on 19 May 2015 that Shkiryak would return to being the advisor to Avakov, the Minister of Internal Affairs, dealing primarily with the ATO. As with his time prior in the role, he became known for high-profile statements. In late June, he claimed that OSCE observers in the Donbas regions were noticeably absent when militants broke the Minsk agreements, claiming they were everywhere else besides the areas they were supposed to be in. Later that year, in November, he called for Vladimir Putin's aide, Vladislav Surkov, to be put on a "world black list" of international terrorists and be declared persona non grata in Ukraine due to Surkov's role in the 2014 Russian annexation of Crimea and said he was possibly involved in the police shootings during Euromaidan. Later that month, he called for a criminal case to be opened against Kryvyi Rih's mayor, Yuriy Vilkul, after the election rounds. He suggested that the CEC and Mykhaylo Okhendovsky were "sabotaging" the race, claiming corruption between Vilkul and the Opposition Bloc. A few days later, he also repeated his earlier statements thtat regular Russian soldiers were involved in the War in the Donbas, and that Russia was mounting troops on the border regions.

The following year, he claimed that Viktor Medvedchuk was a representative of Russia who had been a spokesman for the militants during the Minsk agreements and was an agent of the KGB and later the Russian special forces. Medvedchuk would later sue him over this, with a court in Obolon in May 2021 ruling partially in Medvedchuk's favour, saying some of the statements were untrue and needed to be retracted. However, the Kyiv Court of Appeal then overturned the Obolon ruling on 20 October 2021, finding the statements true. In April 2016, he denied Mikheil Saakashvili's (the then Governor of Odesa Oblast) claims that Petro Poroshenko had ordered units to Odesa, which led Saakashvili to demand he retract the denial. Then, after the death of Arsen Pavlov, he claimed the FSB was the one behind the attack, and that they had cleaned up a Kremlin product, and said that a number of other prominent pro-Russian militants were "Russian-terrorist scum" and that they should "kill each other and burn in hell". A year later, in February 2017, the DNR militant commander, Eduard Basurin, said that he did not rule out Shkirayk's involvement in the death of another militant, Mikhail Tolstykh ("Givi"). In response, Shkiryak denied his involvement in the killing. Then, two days later, on 10 February, the journalist Artem Kol from Russia 24 reported that two people had killed Givi - Zoryan and Shkiryak, which Shkiryak joked about. As a result, "Zoryan and Shkiryak" became a meme in Ukrainian media. He then led calls for the Russian platforms VK and Odnoklassniki to be blocked in Ukraine, claiming they were controled by Russian special forces, and called on the Ribbon of Saint George not to be used as they were signs of "Russian terrorism". Later that year, he proposed criminal liability to be introduced for insulting or condemning Euromaidan after Yevhen Murayev, a pro-Russian political and media owner, called the events a "coup".

Just before the end of his time in office, in April 2021, during the time when Russia was amassing troops near the border, he said the Ministry of Interior was ready for the possibility of a full-scale invasion, and said Ukraine was still making every diplomatic effort to resolve the Donbas area. On 13 July 2021, Avakov submitted his resignation after seven years in office, with Shkiryak confirmed to leave along with him.

== Personal life ==
He has two children: Zoreslava-Maria (she was 14 in 2013) and Khrystyna-Sofiya (she was 8 in 2013). As of 2013, Khrystyna-Sofiya lived abroad with her mother. Zoreslava-Maria lives with Zoryan and his common-law wife, Kateryna, and Kateryna's daughter, Ulyana.
