= 11 December 2013 Euromaidan assault =

Civil conflict incident in Kyiv

11 December 2013 police assault on Euromaidan
- Part of Euromaidan
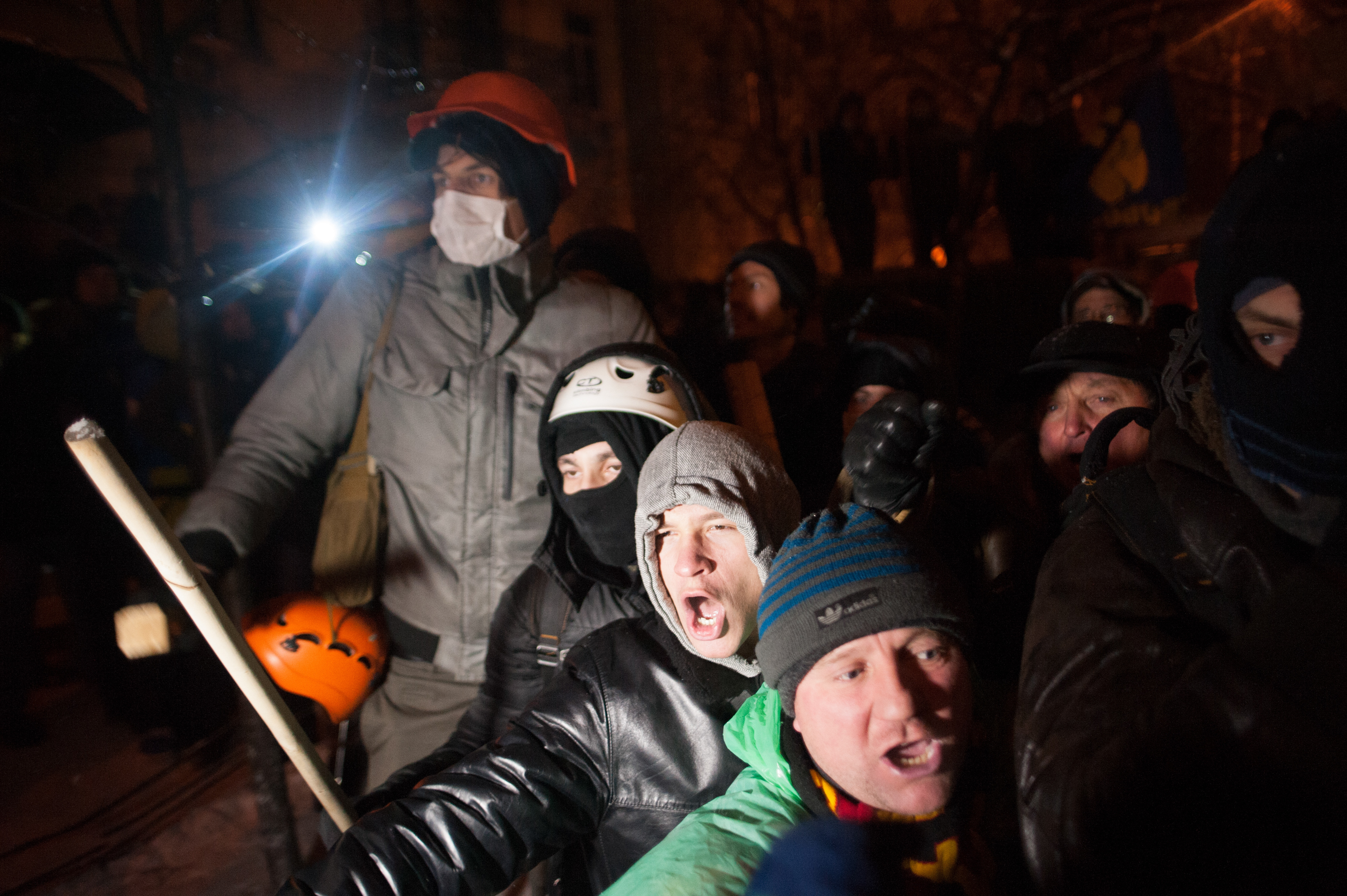
- Police clash with protesters on the night of 10 December
- Date: 10–12 December 2013
- Location: Kyiv, Ukraine
- Caused by: Police attempt to clear Maidan
- Goals: Clearing the Euromaidan Protest
- Methods: Protesting, raiding, civil disobedience
- Result: Police pushed back

Parties
Maidan protesters	Ministry of Internal Affairs: Internal Troops of Ukraine; Berkut

Number
Kyiv: 400,000–800,000 protesters 12,000 "self-defense sotnia"	4,000 Berkut; 1,000 Internal Troops; 3,000–4,000 titushky

Casualties and losses
Some injured	

The assault of Euromaidan by security forces on 11 December 2013 was an attempt by Viktor Yanukovych's government to break up the Euromaidan protest through a night assault using Berkut special police units and interior ministry troops. Their tactics included the displacement of frontal peaceful protesters from lightly barricaded camps at the Independence Square and part of Khreshchatyk Street which is near Bessarabska Square.

The government claimed the need to maintain public order and the enforcement of a decision made by the Pecherskyi District Court, that was read by state bailiffs to the protesters. However, it was later established that such a procedure was illegal, as state executors only had the right to read decisions until 10pm. The court order was also explicit in the fact that Vitali Klitschko was forbidden to hinder citizens moving along the main streets. Vitali Klitschko himself was not aware of this decision, nor was he given the opportunity to appeal it. People responsible for the assault against the protesters have not been identified.

== Events ==
=== Beginning of the assault ===
The Berkut special police units began their attempt to clear up Euromaidan at 1:02 am. The Berkut soldiers began to break down the barricades on Instytutska Street, while starting a fight with "Freedom" party deputies Ruslan Koshulynskyi, Oleksii Kaida, Andrii Mishchenko and Oleh Osuhovskyi. Two of the deputies sustained injuries on their faces and bodies.

At 1:33 a.m. Andriy Shevchenko informed the protesters that Berkut forces were going to break the barricades from the side of Mykhailivska Square. Violent fights occurred in the Square as the Berkut started destroying the barricade on Instytutska Street, and Titushky started plundering the camp. Although the government concentrated a large number of security forces around the square, protesters did not give up and their number eventually grew. Berkut used tear gas on the protesters and the clouds of smoke were visible over the crowd as reports about arrested and injured people, including MPs, were being aired in the news. Calls for the mass mobilization of Kyiv citizens to the Maidan were spread and many people responded to the call.

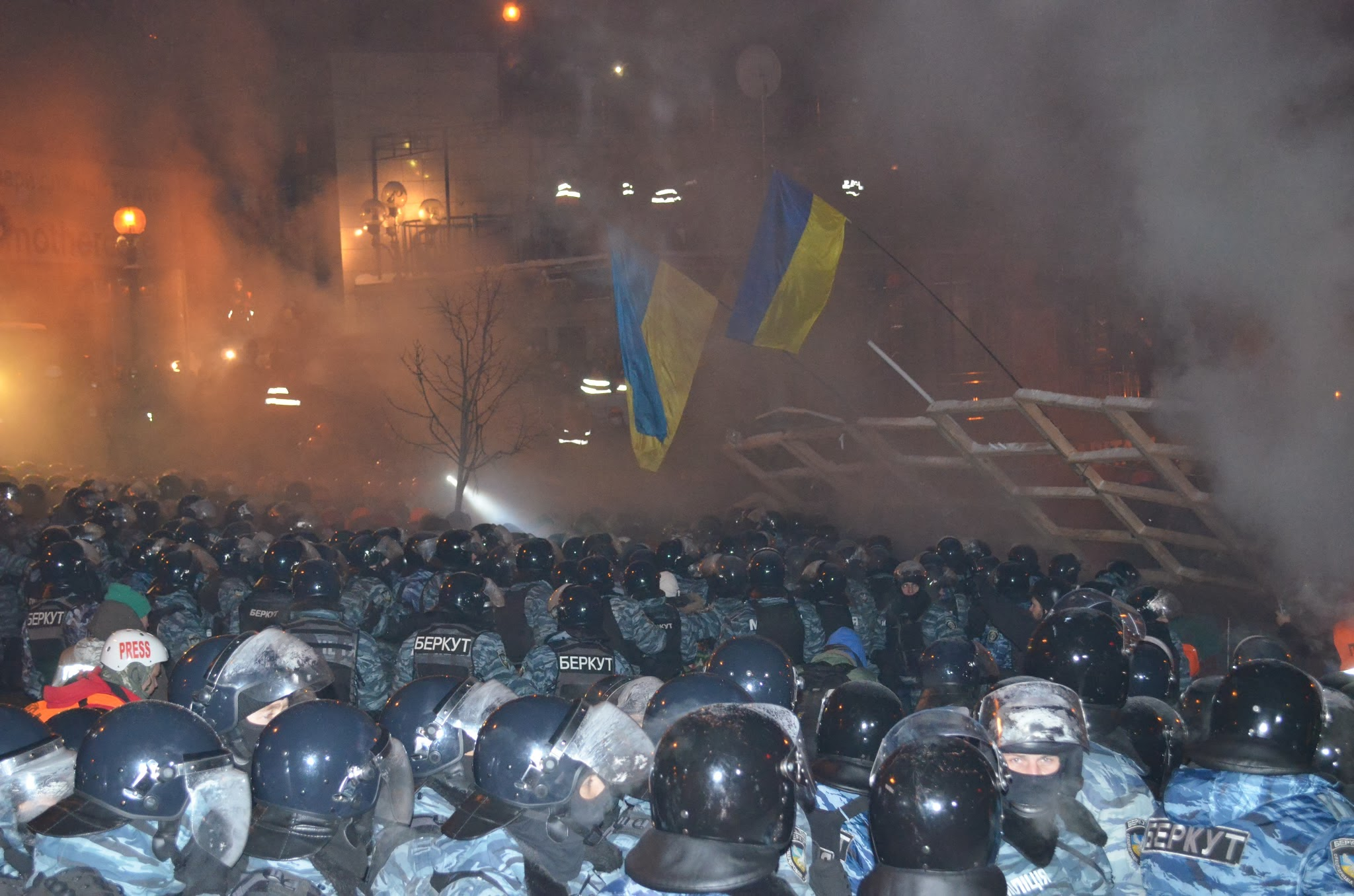
Berkut assault on Maidan Nezalezhnosti.

=== Main assault ===
The Berkut suspended their assault and protesters were given shields, which were obtained from the Berkut. The Berkut began to regroup and move against the protesters once again. Unarmed protesters with linked arms had been holding the Euromaidan defense line for three hours against the large mass of Berkut from the Instytutska street side of the square. The number of people at Euromaidan grew, but the leaders of Berkut were also trying to regroup their forces in order to attack from the other side. Several titushky (thugs) sprang out from the Prorizna street and started to attack people with the intent to organize a hash. There were more than 15 thousand people on the Maidan at this time. The Berkut continued trying to break into the Trade Unions Building. With the number of people on the Maidan increasing, the Berkut came closer to the Maidan and tried to encircle it.

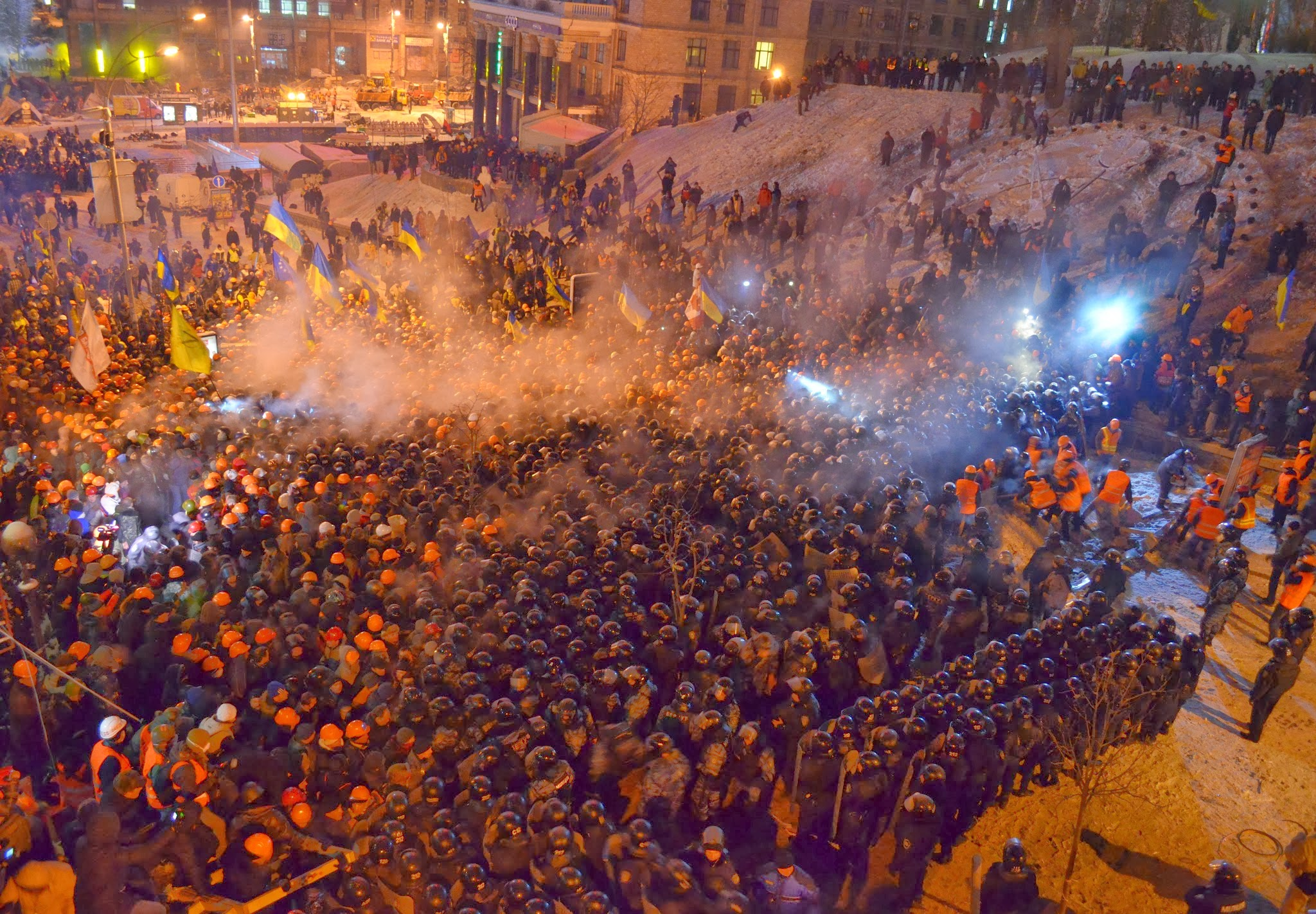
Euromaidan, night of 11 December 2013

=== Bells of the Maidan ===
As 4,000 Berkut soldiers attacked the square, the bell-ringer of the St. Michael's Golden-Domed Monastery Ivan Sydor (of the UOC-KP), rang the bells in alarm. The bells rang constantly from 1am to 5am, "urging people to go to the main square of the capital and support the protesters who were threatened by Yanukovych's security forces." 8 hours after the assault had begun, Maidan self-defense units stabilized the Euromaidan perimeter by pushing the Berkut fighters back beyond the barricades.

== Aftermath ==
The forceful assault of the peaceful protesters is mostly seen by observers as unreasonable. Observers have stated that if Yanukovych simply let the protesters be, the demonstrations would have died out. Due to the violent and illegal crackdown by authorities, the demonstration proved to be a success. The warning alarm system of the National Resistance Headquarters enabled activists to come by cars, public transport and some taxis gave free rides. The illegal court order served by the assaulting forces was not executed and the government did not attempt to enforce it again.

Ultimately, the Euromaidan protest and its crackdown contributed to the collapse of Yanukovych's government in February 2014. Scholars noted that the demonstration showed an unprecedented tenacity and organization on the part of the protesters - phenomena that are considered unique in post-Soviet mass mobilization. Specifically, this aspect also gave rise to an emergent volunteer movement and the rise in activism of civil society groups in Ukraine. The majority of the protesters were not affiliated with any political organization.

The Euromaidan protest also has bearing on the Russian response to the protest and Yanukovych ouster. Its annexation of Crimea and its military incursion into Ukraine were activities that - for a number of observers - indicate a fear of having to contend with "a Maidan of its own, about exercising control in its 'spheres of interests and influence' and about contradictions between East and West, as perceived by Russia."

On 20 February 2019, priest Ivan Sydor, who had rung the bell of the St. Michael's Golden-Domed Monastery, received the Ukrainian Order of Merit of the third class "[f]or civic courage, selfless defence of the constitutional principles of democracy, human rights and freedoms, discovered during the Revolution of Dignity, fruitful public and volunteering activities". On 4 April 2019, it was reported that Ivan Sydor had received his Ukrainian Order of Merit of the third class from Yevhen Nyshchuk, the Ukrainian Minister for Culture.

== Gallery ==
Euromaidan's defense on December 11

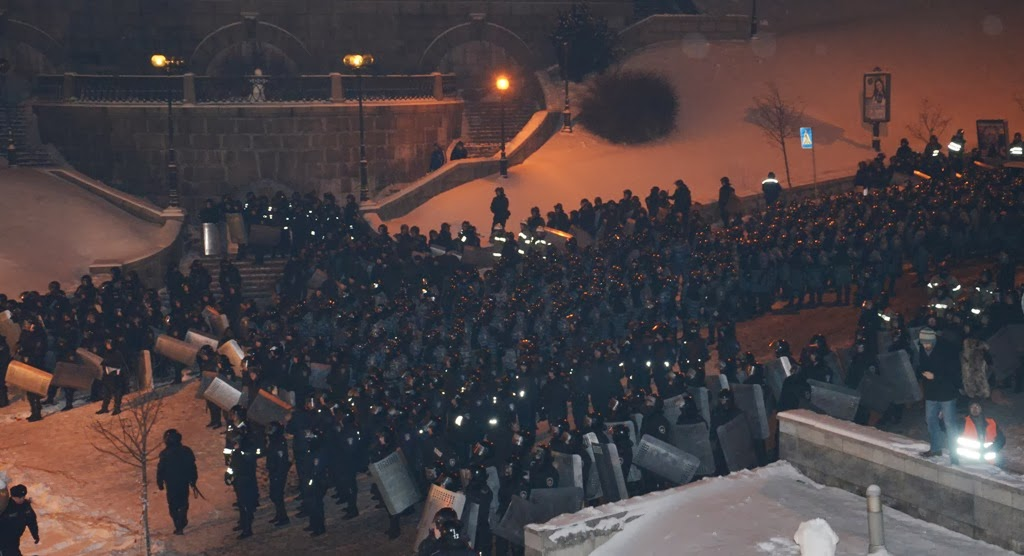
Crowd of Berkutians on Institutskaya Street ready to attack

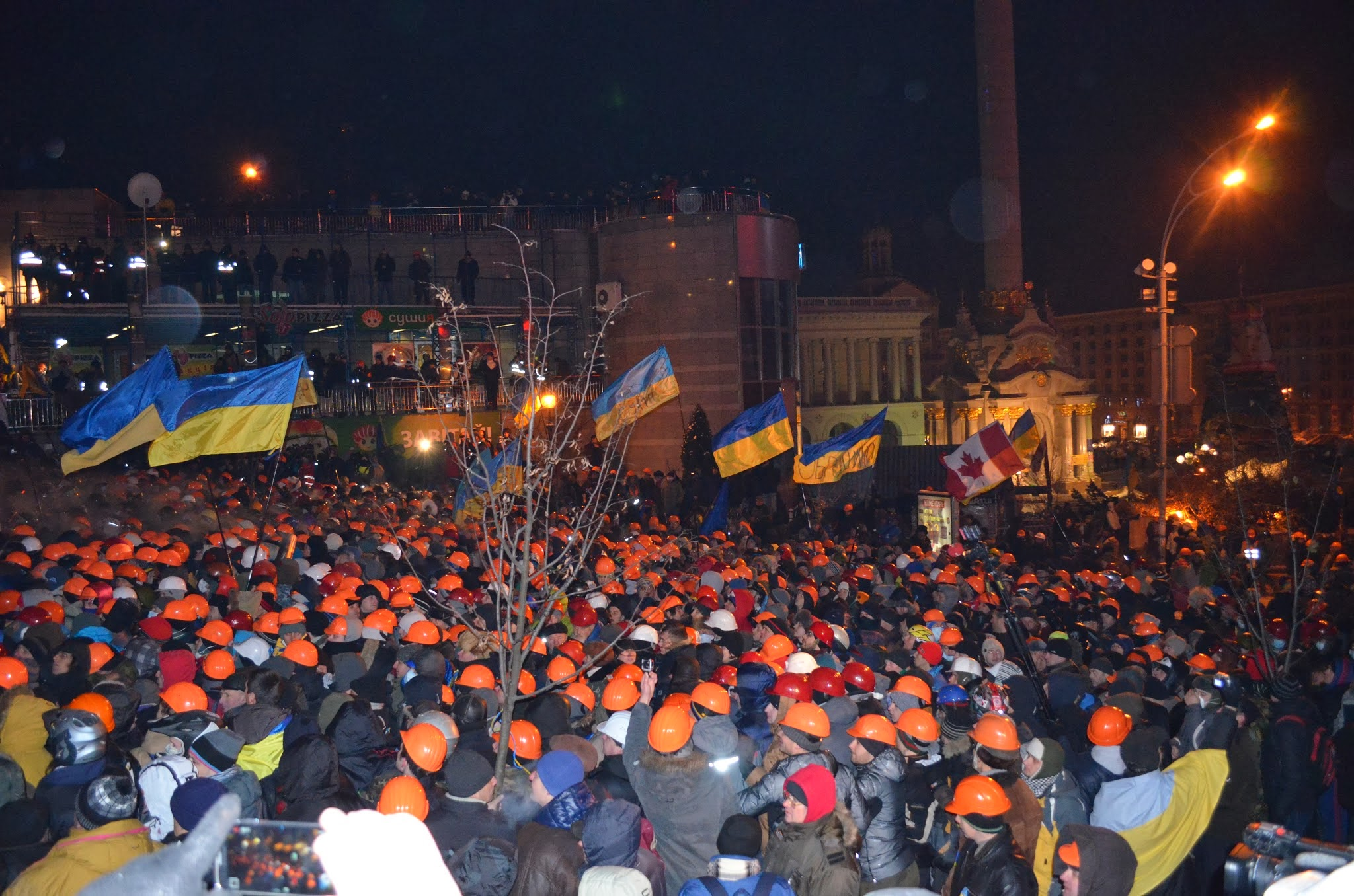
Maidan defenders on Institutskaya Street are ready to defend themselves

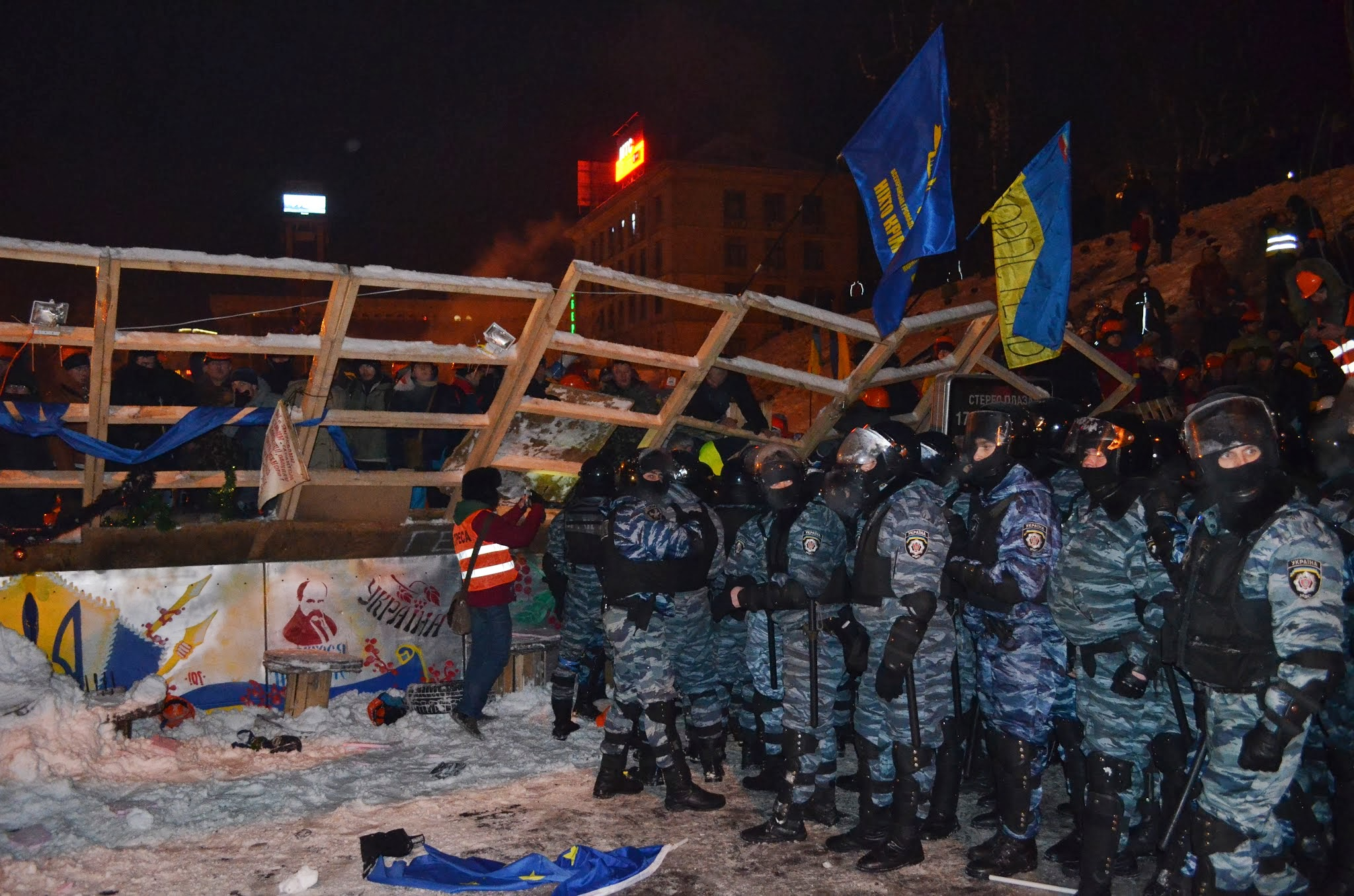
The onset of the storming of barricades

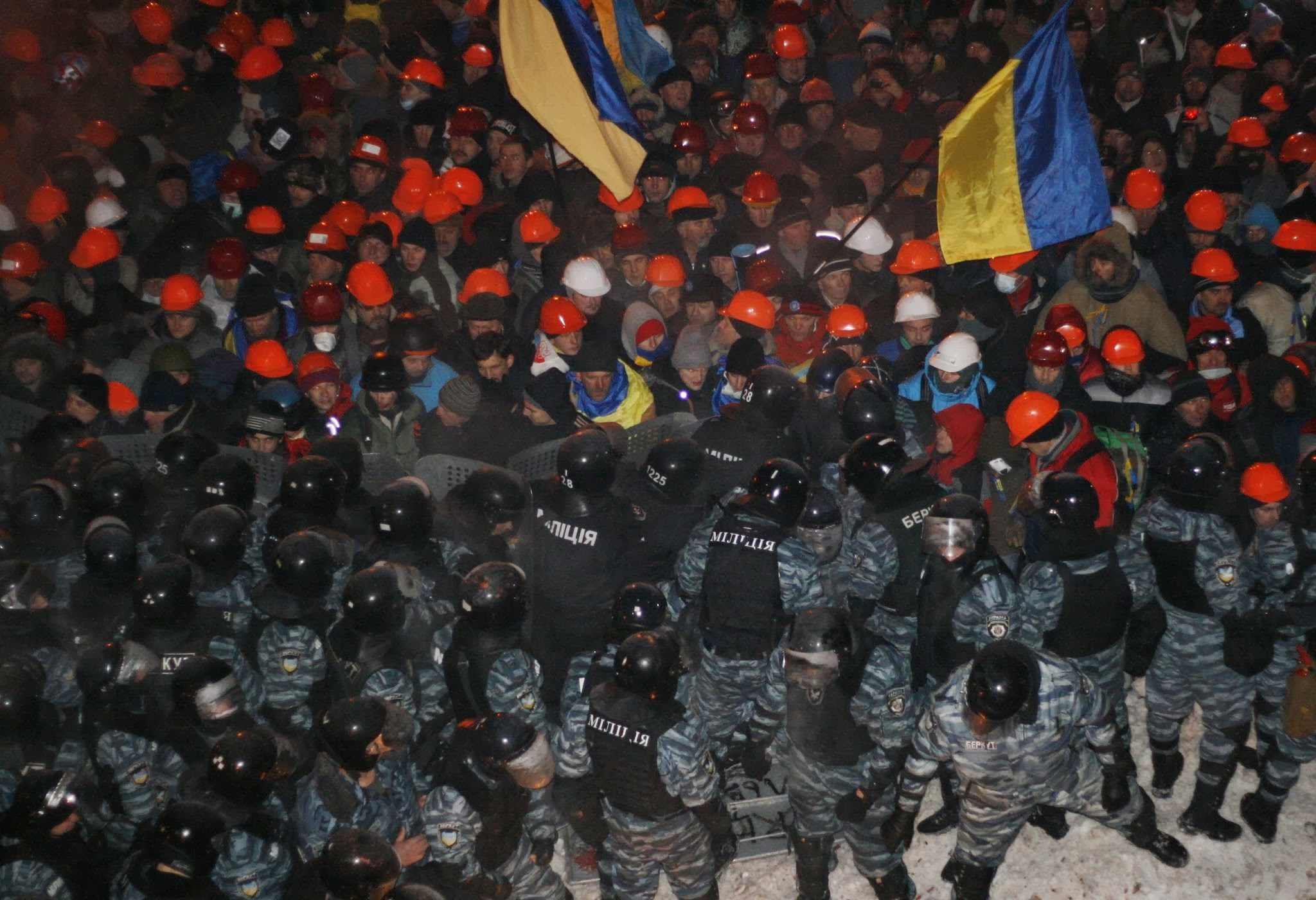
Defenders of the Maidan are holding back the onset of Berkut

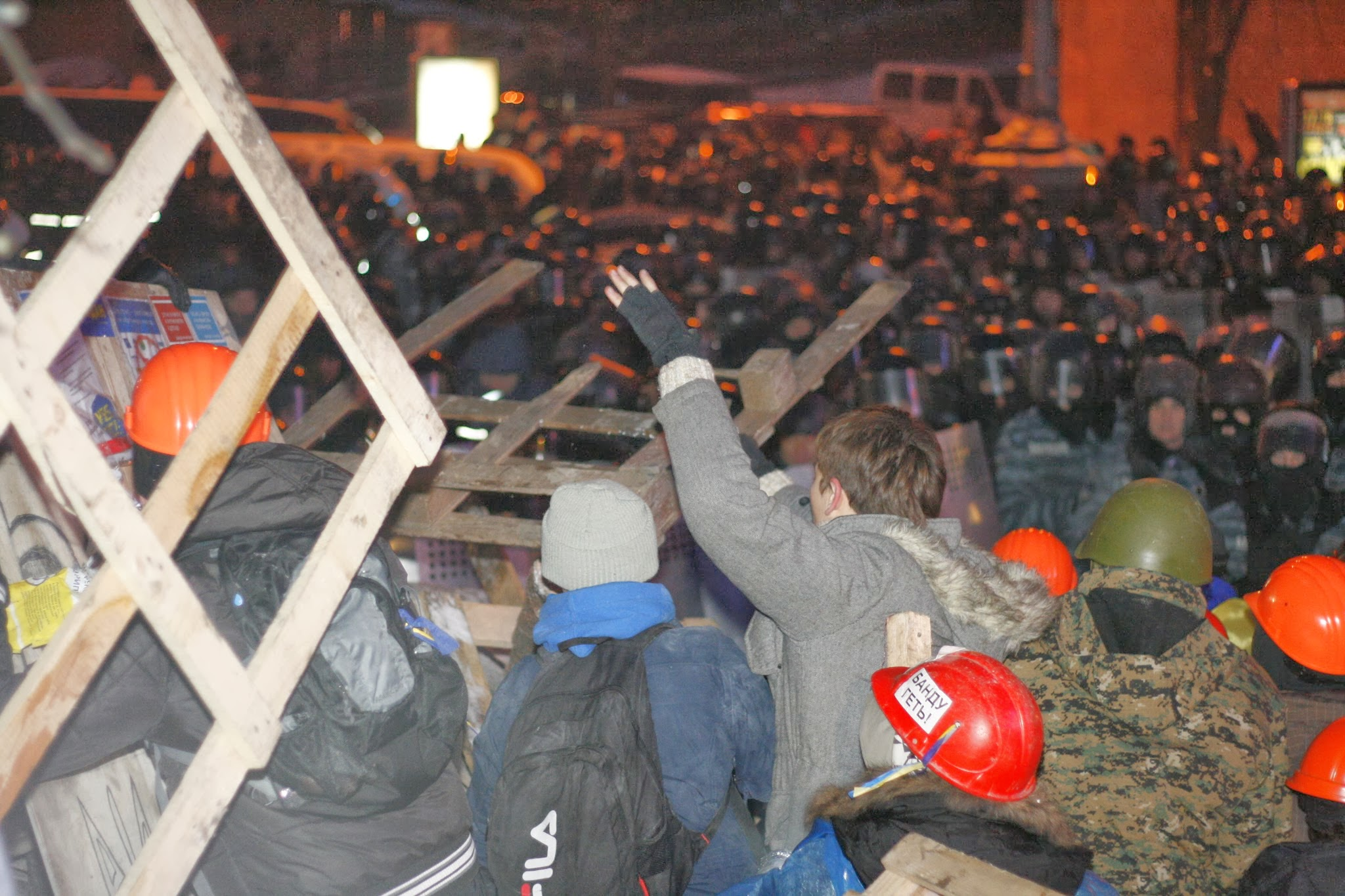
Barricade protection

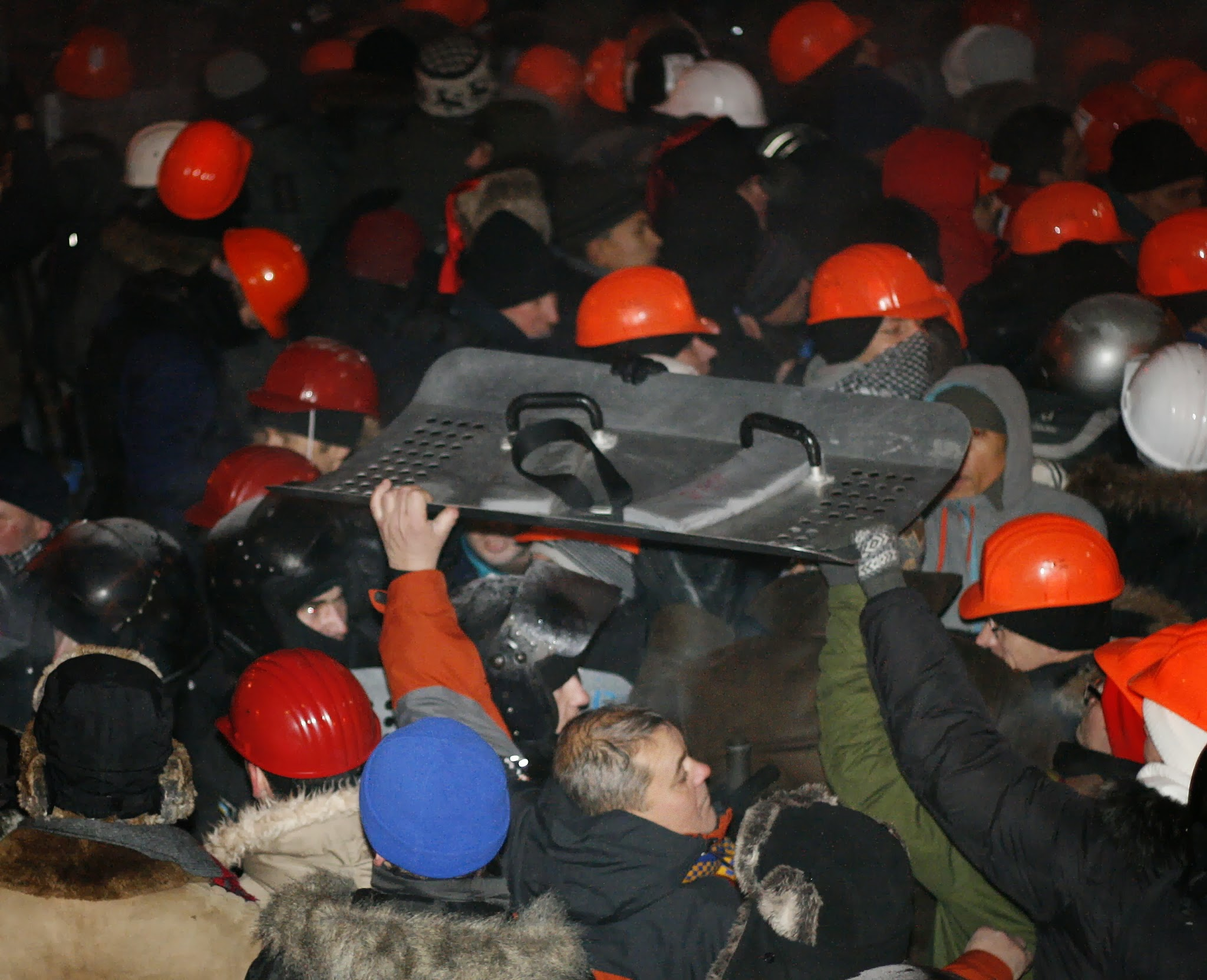
Golden eagle shield

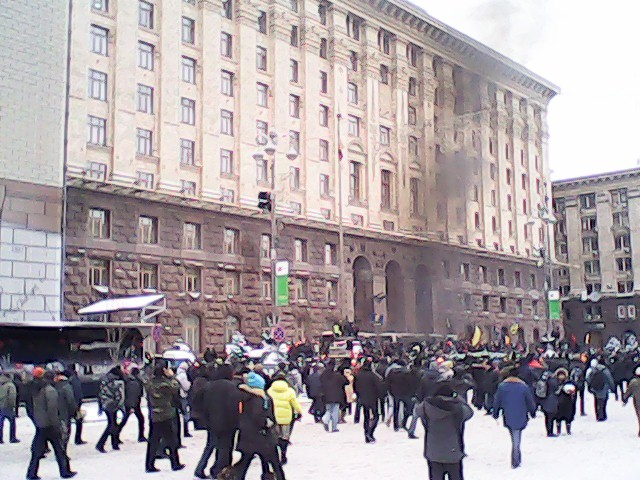
Reflecting the attack near the KSCA

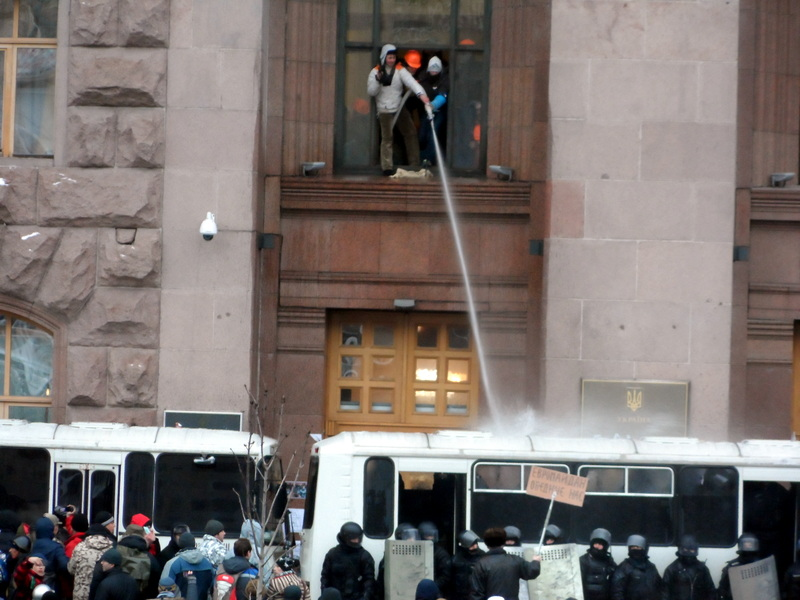
Protesters pour siloviki water from the KSCA premises

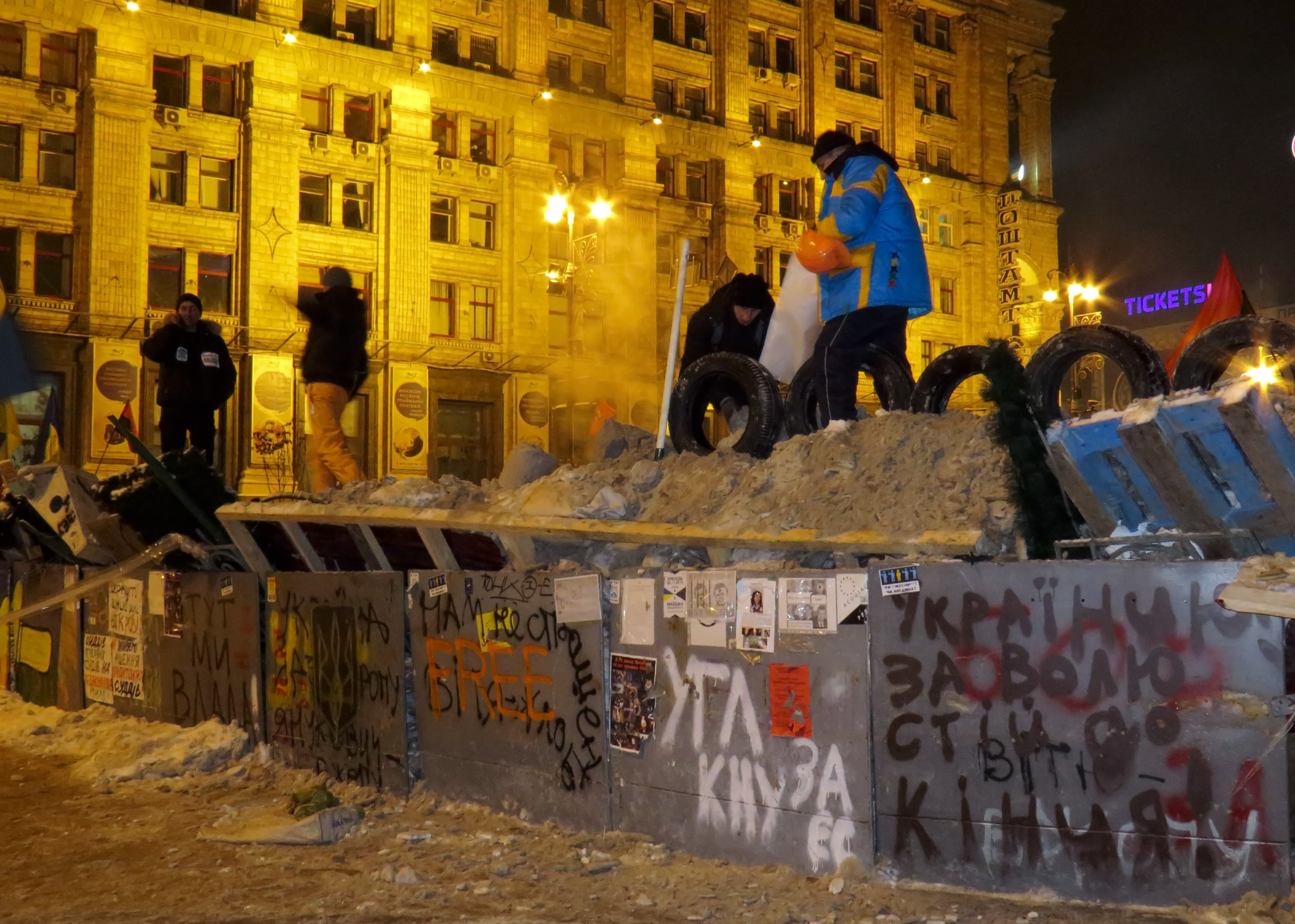
Restored after storming the barricade on the street. Khreshchatyk
