= Ihor Lutsenko =

Ihor Lutsenko may refer to:

- Ihor Lutsenko (politician), Ukrainian politician
- Ihor Lutsenko (footballer), Ukrainian footballer
