= Mykola Chechotkin =

Ukrainian politician (born 1965)

- Микола Чечоткін
- Chechotkin in 2015.

Head of the State Emergency Service of Ukraine
- In office 14 May 2015 – 10 November 2021
- President: Petro Poroshenko; Volodymyr Zelenskyy
- Prime Minister: Arseniy Yatsenyuk; Volodymyr Groysman; Oleksiy Honcharuk; Denys Shmyhal
- Preceded by: Zoryan Shkiryak
- Succeeded by: Serhii Kruk

Personal details
- Born: 29 November 1965 (age 60) Ivano-Frankivsk, Ukrainian SSR, Soviet Union
- Education: Kyiv Higher Tank Engineering School (1988); National Academy for Public Administration (2008)

Mykola Oleksandrovych Chechotkin (Ukrainian: Микола Олександрович Чечоткін born 29 November 1965) is a Ukrainian politician, emergency personnel, and civil servant who served as the Head of the State Emergency Service of Ukraine (DSNS) from 2015 to 2021 under both presidents Petro Poroshenko and Volodymyr Zelenskyy.

== Early life ==
Chechotkin was born on 29 November 1965 in the city of Ivano-Frankivsk, which was then part of the Ukrainian SSR of the Soviet Union. After graduating from secondary school, he entered the Kyiv Higher Tank Engineering School, which he graduated from in 1988. Afterwards, he returned to the school to become a company commander of the battalion cadets in their first level of training. Two years later, in 1990, he became the head of the course for cadets within the Faculty of Automotives at the Kyiv branch of the Hetman Petro Sahaidachnyi National Ground Forces Academy. He continued at the post even after the collapse of the Soviet Union until 1988, when he became a lecturer at the Department of Automotive Technology within the Faculty of Automotives at his alma mater, the Kyiv Higher Tank Engineering School.

== Career in the DSNS ==
Later on, he was appointed head of the automotive services for the 1st Support Unit of what was then the Ministry of Emergency Situations. He was then moved to become head of the data preparation department for the 1st Support Unit. In 2002, he started working in the Division for the Coordination of Force Deployment within the Monitoring and Coordination of Force Deployment Directorate of the Ministry of Emergency Situations. Over time, his unit was renamed and shifted into multiple different departments. In 2006, he started holding more managerial positions within the central office of the Ministry of Emergency Situations. He graduated from the National Academy for Public Administration with a master's degree in public administration in 2008 while on the job. Also, while he was serving in this role, in 2012, the Ministry of Emergency Situations was reorganised into the State Emergency Service of Ukraine (DSNS) and was subordinated to the Ministry of Defense of Ukraine. On 25 April 2014, the DSNS was resubordinated to the Ministry of Internal Affairs of Ukraine, where it stated. A short time later, in July 2014, he became Director of the Department for the Organisation of Civil Protection Measures within the DSNS.

== 2015-2021: Head of the DSNS ==
A main focus of Chechotkin's early career with the DSNS was demining (pictured here) during the ongoing War in the Donbas.

DSNS personnel after the Battle of Avdiivka in 2017. Under Chechotkin, the DSNS began focusing more on the Donbas due to the ongoing War in the Donbas.

On 14 May 2015, Chechotkin was appointed Head of the DSNS under Petro Poroshenko on the same day that Zoryan Shkiryak was dismissed from the post. Upon being appointed, Shkiryak called him a "true professional" who actively participated in the cleanup following the Siege of Sloviansk. As with the two previous heads, most of his early work was focused on the War in the Donbas, which was still ongoing. One of the priority areas early on under Chechotkin was demining areas that were in the Anti-Terrorist Operation Zone (ATO), with aid for the demining being provided by Germany, which allocated nearly 1 million euros as part of an OSCE project. Chechotkin claimed that more than 42 thousand explosive devices had to be demined since the start of the war, and said that parts of them were specifically designed to be household items like children's toys and books. He also continued reforming the DSNS, specifically in the Donetsk area, as part of lustration practices initiated by Shkiryak. In late 2015, he also signed a memorandum of cooperation with the then Head of the military civil administration of Donetsk Oblast, Pavlo Zhebrivskyi, which provided for the launch of a pilot program to develop a civil protection system within newly formed territorial communities in the Donetsk area.

In 2016, as part of the DSNS's shift to focusing on the Donbas during the war, the first Citizen Security Centre in Ukraine was opened in Lyman, which would allow volunteer firefighters to help be trained under professional ones. Later that year, Chechotkin confirmed that the DSNS rescuers were being given technical assistance from NATO in the areas of Donetsk Oblast. Most of the equipment given was for demining as part of NATO's programme "Assistance in Humanitarian Demining in Ukraine". Two years later, in February 2018, the Cabinet of Ministers decided to add a new high position to the DSNS, a deputy head, which was stated to be to strengthen the leadership of the DSNS in the areas of the ATO. Later that year, Poroshenko decided to hand over new equipment to the DSNS, including a series of helicopters (as at the time, the DSNS only had 10 across the entire country).

As part of the earlier 2015-16 agreements to build Citizen Security Centres in the Donbas, around 7 were built by 2018, with a planned total of 28. By 2019, there were 10, with the newest in Sviatohirsk. Two years later, in 2021, there were 21, with the newest being in the frontline settlement of Ocheretyne. The price of the one in Ocheretyne was put at 24 million hryvnias. On 10 November 2021, after more than six years in the office, he was dismissed by the Cabinet of Ministers, with Serhii Kruk appointed as acting director of the DSNS.

== Personal life ==
He is married to Olena Mykolaivna and has a daughter, Veronika. According to his declarations in 2015, he owned a house in Chernihiv Oblast and an apartment in Kyiv. His stated personal income was 377,934 hryvnias directly, with a total family income of 517,360 hryvnias.

== Honours and awards ==
Chechotkin has been awarded the following honours and awards:

- "For Courage in an Emergency Situation", II degree (by DSNS, 2004)
- Honourary Distinction of the Ministry of Emergency Situations of Ukraine (by DSNS, 2008)
- Major General of the Civil Defense Service (26 August 2015)
- Lieutenant General of the Civil Defense Service (23 August 2017)
- Honourary citizen of Sloviansk (22 August 2019)
- Colonel General of the Civil Defense Service (23 August 2020)
