= Serhiy Bochkovsky =

Ukrainian politician (1966-2023)

- Сергій Бочковський
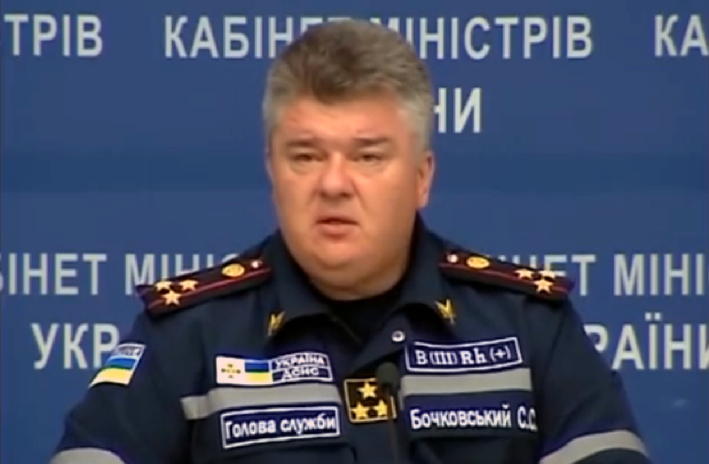
- Bochkovsky in 2014.

Head of the State Emergency Service of Ukraine
- In office 23 April 2014 – 25 March 2015
- President: Oleksandr Turchynov (acting); Petro Poroshenko
- Prime Minister: Arseniy Yatsenyuk
- Preceded by: Mykhaylo Bolotskykh
- Succeeded by: Zoryan Shkiryak (acting)

Personal details
- Born: 20 November 1966 Haisyn, Ukrainian SSR, Soviet Union
- Died: November 27, 2023 (aged 57)
- Education: Lviv Fire Technical School of the Ministry of Internal Affairs of the USSR (1986); Kyiv National University of Construction and Architecture (1993)

Serhiy Stanislavovych Bochkovsky (Ukrainian: Сергій Станіславович Бочковський, 20 November 1966-27 November 2023) was a Ukrainian politician and civil servant who served as the Head of the State Emergency Service of Ukraine (DSNS) from 2014 to 2015, under both presidents Oleksandr Turchynov and Petro Poroshenko. He was removed early due to legal issues after he was detained on corruption charges, which would go on until 2020.

== Early life ==
Bochkovsky was born on 20 November 1966 in the city of Haisyn, then part of the Ukrainian SSR of the Soviet Union. After graduating from secondary school, he attended the Fire Technical School of the Ministry of Internal Affairs of the USSR in Lviv, which he graduated from in 1986. Afterwards, he started working as an inspector at the 4th independent militarised fire station of what was then the Leninskyi District of Kyiv. While working at the fire station, he graduated from the Kyiv National University of Construction and Architecture in 1993. Afterwards, he rose from inspector to chief of the 4th independent state fire brigade of the former Starokyivskyi district of Kyiv.

== Career ==
In February 2003, Bochkovsky moved towards working managerial positions at the Main Department of what was then the Ministry of Emergency Situations in Kyiv. After four years, he was promoted to Deputy Head of the State Department of Fire Safety of the Ministry of Emergency Situations in April. Bochkovsky served in this role for a further two years until 2009, when he became a senior research fellow at the research centre for the Ukrainian Research Institute of Fire Safety, which is part of the Ministry of Emergency Situations. He only stayed at the research centre for a year, though, until he became First Deputy Head of the Main Department of the Ministry of Emergency Situations for Odesa Oblast. Simultaneously, as First Deputy Head of the directorate for Odesa, he also served as chief of the terriotorial body of state fire supervision, civil protection, and technogenic safety for Odesa. While he was serving in this role, in 2012, the Ministry of Emergency Situations was reorganised into the State Emergency Service of Ukraine (DSNS) and was subordinated to the Ministry of Defense of Ukraine.

== 2014-2015: State Emergency Service of Ukraine ==
On 23 April 2014, Bochkovsky was appointed by Ukrainian President Petro Poroshenko to head the State Emergency Service of Ukraine (DSNS). According to Anton Gerashchenko, his candidacy was recommended by then Minister of Defense, Mykhailo Koval. Two days after the took office, on 25 April 2014, the DSNS was resubordinated to the Ministry of Internal Affairs of Ukraine. In a statement shortly thereafter, Bochkovsky praised this move, saying it was a step towards European integration, since in most European countries emergency rescue units are delegated to the internal affairs bodies, and that it would lead to more effective implementation of tasks. As part of the move towards European integration, soon after he signed an agreement on cooperation and mutual assistance in the fields of disaster and emergency prevention with his Polish counterpart, Wiesław Leśniakiewicz. The plan was designed for two years, until 2016, with a possibility of extension.

However, his time in office was mostly dominated by the DSNS's response to the ongoing War in the Donbas. As part of this, he set forward the task of preparing the existing bomb shelters in Ukraine for operation. He also began leading and coordinating the DSNS in sending tonnes of humanitarian aid from Kyiv, Dnipro, and Kharkiv to residents of the affected areas in Luhansk Oblast and Donetsk Oblast. From July to August 2014, more than 1,200 tonnes of humanitarian aid were sent to the Donbas from across Ukraine with the coordination of the DSNS. Modular homes were also built in eastern Ukraine for displaced persons from the Donbas, and the DSNS helped with what he called the "restoration of life" for the territories that were liberated during the ATO, specifically in the city of Sloviansk. Thus, in September 2014, Bochkovsky reported there was a reversal of trends of people leaving the Donbas, as they began returning to the territories that were liberated.

In a widely reported move, Bochkovsky was arrested live on air during a government meeting by Ukrainian officials on charges of corruption on 25 March 2015, together with the deputy head of the DSNS, Vasyl Stoyetskyi. Both were dismissed later that day from their roles pending an investigation.

== 2015-2020: Legal issues ==
On the day of his arrest, on 25 March 2015, it was reported that the criminal case against him on charges of corruption had been opened at the request of multiple members of the Verkhovna Rada. According to the investigator in the opened case, both Bochkovsky and his deputy head were involved in a scheme for tender purchases of fuel and lubricants from the companies "Yukoil", "Alliance", and others at inflated prices. Also, companies that offered lower prices were not allowed to participate in tenders, with parts of the funds received from the tenders allegedly being transferred to the personal accounts of Bochkovsky and his deputy head. Three days later, on 28 March 2015, the Pecherskyi District Court of Kyiv affirmed the request for the arrest of both Bochkovsky and his deputy head. The court set the possibility of posting bail at 1,184,000 hryvnias (around 50,000 dollars), with the custody duration being 2 months. Four days later, both of their bails were posted. In October 2015, the Ministry of Internal Affairs announced they had completed their pre-trial investigation against him and his deputy, stating that the accused crimes had resulted in the state suffering damages exceeding 6.6 million hryvnias. Bochkovsky's actions were charged under Part 4 of Article 368 (accepting an offer, promise, or receipt of an unlawful benefit by an official), Part 2 of Article 364 (abuse of power or official position), and Part 1 of Article 366 (official forgery) under the Criminal Code of Ukraine.

In November 2015, the Ministry of Internal Affairs submitted its investigations and indictment to the court. Separate proceedings were also opened, and a case concerning the laundering of illicit funds using card accounts opened through the Bank of Cyprus was opened, with the government requesting investigative assistance from Cyprus, Belize, the United States, and Latvia. Nearly three years later, in April 2018, the Kyiv District Administrative Court announced its ruling in the case. In its decision, it declared that the Cabinet of Ministers' dismissal of Bochkovsky was unlawful, and it annulled the dismissal order, officially reinstating him as Head of the DSNS. The court also ordered the state to pay him his average salary when he was Head of the DSNS for the entire period from 25 March 2015 until he could return to work at the DSNS. The ruling was subject to an appeal for a 30-day window with the Kyiv Administrative Court of Appeal. However, it did not rule yet in the violations of the Criminal Code yet. A few days later, on 27 April 2018, Bochkovsky returned to the DSNS headquarters per the reinstatement order, but security refused to allow him in, citing what they called a lack of government order. In response, the Ministry of Internal Affairs announced they had filed an appeal against the court's decision, and said they would submit a complaint against the judges in the case to the High Council of Justice. In August 2018, Arsen Avakov, the Minister of Internal Affairs, promised that Bochkovsky would never be reinstated, as he called him an unworthy officer. After nearly two years of a stalemate, the Cassation Administrative Court of the Supreme Court issued a ruling that upheld the decision to reinstate Bochkovsky.

== Death ==
On 27 November 2023, it was reported by the DSNS that Bochkovsky had died after a long illness. On Facebook, a pre-recorded video was uploaded in which he said he had sent his wife and daughter his money. His daughter, Karolina, said that Bochkovsky would have a memorial service in the village of Rozhny in Kyiv Oblast.

== Honours and awards ==
Bochkovsky was awarded the following honours during his lifetime:

- Medal "For Irreproachable Service", III degree (1999)
