= All-Ukrainian Political Party "Ecology and Social Protection" =

Political party in Ukraine

The All-Ukrainian Political Party "Ecology and Social Protection" (Ukrainian: "Всеукраїнська Політична партія – Екологія та Соціальний захист") is a political party in Ukraine registered in November 2003.

The party did not participate in national elections till 2007. In the 2007 parliamentary elections, the party failed as part of the Christian Bloc to win parliamentary representation. The party did not participate in the 2012 parliamentary elections. And again the party did not participate in the 2014 Ukrainian parliamentary election.
