= Andrii Danyk =

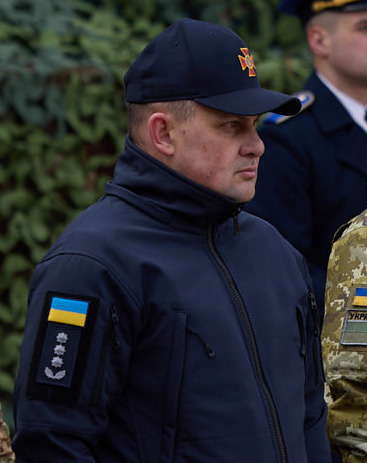
Danyk on 26 March 2024.

Andriy Mykolayovych Danyk (Ukrainian: Андрі́й Микола́йович Да́ник born October 26, 1978) is a Ukrainian Lieutenant General and the current Head of the State Emergency Service of Ukraine.

== Biography ==
He was born on October 26, 1978, in the city of Kirovograd. In 2002, he graduated from the Cherkasy Institute of Fire Safety as a fire safety engineer.

In July 1998, he became the head of the guard of the 79th independent state fire department of the city of Starobesheve, the State Fire Protection Department of the Ministry of Internal Affairs of Ukraine in Donetsk Oblast. From January 1999 to December 2003, he worked in various positions at the 79th independent state fire Department of the city of Starobesheve. In December 2004, he became the head of the state fire supervision service for rural areas of the Starobesheve district. In November 2005, he became the head of the Starobesheve district department, and In May 2012, he became the head of the civil protection department.

In July 2012, he became the head of the 17th State Fire and Rescue Detachment of the Main Territorial Department of the Ministry of Emergency Situations in Donetsk, and In May 2013, he became at the disposal of the head of the department.

In June 2013, he became the head of the Starobeshivskyi district department, and In January 2015, he became the head of the 17th Special Purpose Emergency and Rescue Detachment.

In August 2015, he became Deputy Head of the Main Department of the State Emergency Service in Donetsk Oblast.

From January 2020 to September 2023, he held the position of Head of the Main Department of the State Emergency Service in Cherkasy Oblast. From September 8, 2023, to February 27, 2024, he was acting First Deputy Head of the State Emergency Service of Ukraine.

== Head of the State Emergency Service of Ukraine ==
From February 27, 2024, he was acting Head of the State Emergency Service, being permanently appointed on June 28 of that year. On the Day of the National Flag in 2024, he was awarded the special rank of Major General. On September 30, 2025, he was awarded the special rank of Lieutenant General.

== Personal life ==
He is married to Yulia Danyk, who was the deputy head of one of the departments at the Cherkasy Institute of Fire Safety.
