= Serhii Kruk =

Ukrainian politician (born 1977)

- Сергій Крук
- Kruk in 2022.

Head of the State Emergency Service of Ukraine
- In office 12 November 2021 (Note: Acting from 12 November 2021 until 16 February 2022.) – 25 August 2023
- President: Volodymyr Zelenskyy
- Prime Minister: Denys Shmyhal
- Preceded by: Mykola Chechotkin
- Succeeded by: Volodymyr Demchuk (acting)

Personal details
- Born: 7 August 1977 (age 49) Rivne, Ukrainian SSR, Soviet Union
- Education: Kharkiv Institute of Fire Safety of the Ministry of Internal Affairs of Ukraine (1999); National Academy of Internal Affairs (2008)

Serhii Ivanovych Kruk (Ukrainian: Сергій Іванович Крук; born 7 August 1977) is a Ukrainian politician, emergency personnel, and civil servant who served as the Head of the State Emergency Service of Ukraine (DSNS) from 2022 to 2023 under President Volodymyr Zelenskyy.

== Early life ==
Kruk was born on 7 August 1977 in the city of Rivne, which was then part of the Ukrainian SSR of the Soviet Union. His mother is Mariia, who lived in Versneve, and his father is Ivan Antonovych, an entrepreneur who was a co-owner of the wellness complex "Starodub" in Bronnyky. Starting in September 1994, he began working in the fire protection agencies within what was then the Ministry of Emergency Situations. In 1999, he graduated from the Kharkiv Institute of Fire Safety of the Ministry of Internal Affairs of Ukraine (now the National University of Civil Protection of Ukraine) with a degree in fire safety and the qualification of a specialist in fire safety. Afterwards, he began working as an engineer at the 1st Independent State Fire Brigade in Rivne in July, until he was promoted in February 2001 to deputy head of the state fire supervision of the unit. After two years, in 2003, he was appointed to hold two simultaneous positions: he was head of the state fire supervision service of the Rivne Raion and head of the 10th Professional Fire and Rescue Station in Klevan, which was also in Rivne Raion.

== Career in the DSNS ==
He left after a little more than a year, in December 2004, to become Head of the Department of the Main Directorate of the Ministry of Emergency Situations for Rivne Raion. While on the job, in 2008, he graduated from the National Academy of Internal Affairs with a degree in law and the qualification of a lawyer. Finally, in May 2010, he was promoted to First Deputy Head of the Main Department of the Ministry of Emergency Situations in Rivne Oblast. In 2014, he became Head of the Main Directorate of the State Emergency Service of Ukraine for Rivne Oblast (which the Ministry of Emergency Situations had been reorganised into in 2012).

== 2022-2023: Head of the DSNS ==
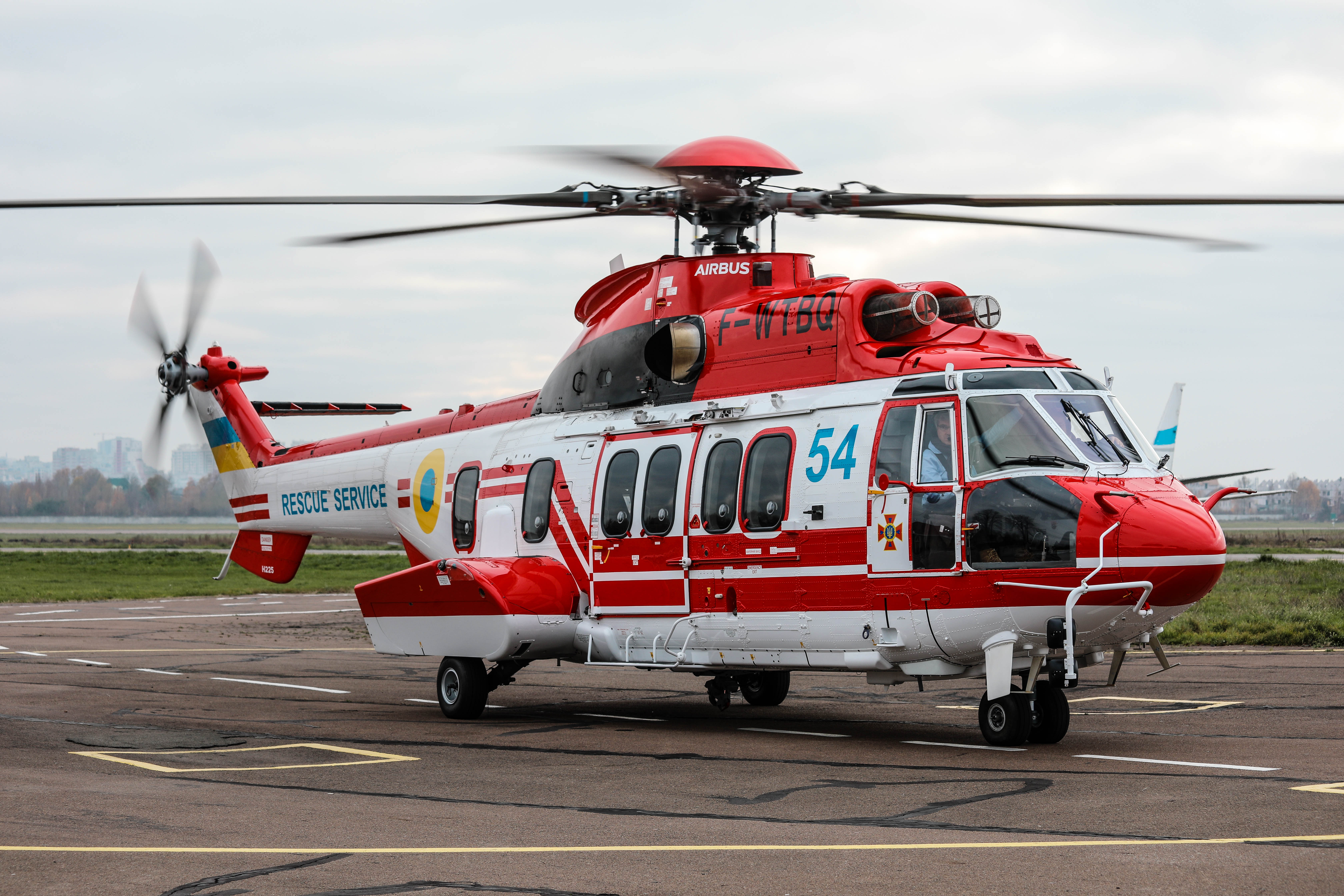
The 2023 Brovary helicopter crash, which used a DSNS aircraft (pictured here), killed a number of high-ranking Ministry of Internal Affairs people. It was reportedly the reason for his dismissal.

On 10 November 2021, Kruk was appointed acting Head of the State Emergency Service of Ukraine after Mykola Chechotkin was dismissed. After he was appointed, Kruk proposed a number of additional measures to strengthen the fire safety situation for healthcare institutions, such as conducting additional training for medical personnel in the case of fires, after three people died during a fire at an intensive care unit in Kosovo, Ivano-Frankivsk Oblast. A few months later, in early February 2022, he signed a joint statement of intent between the DSNS and Desautel SAS, a French manufacturer in fire protection, as part of a series of bilateral agreements between France and Ukraine that month. On 16 February 2022, he was finally confirmed by the Cabinet of Ministers of Ukraine as the Head of the DSNS. Just a few days later, on 24 February, the 2022 Russian invasion of Ukraine began, greatly increasing the role of the DSNS. Afterwards, Kruk signed a memorandum of understanding with the representatives of the rescue services of four European countries: Latvia, Lithuania, Poland, and Estonia. A main focus, like the previous administration during the War in the Donbas, besides responding to disasters, was demining. By November 2022, Kruk claimed that around 30% of the entire territory of Ukraine was mined, as he said the number of mined areas had increased tenfold compared to the pre-war period.

As part of this effort, the DSNS under Kruk received numerous specialised demining vehicles, such as those from the Howard G. Buffett Foundation and the Canadian government. As part of the UNDP project "Emergency Explosive Ordnance and Debris Clearance", other foreign aid was also given to Kruk's DSNS by Japan. A main focus was put on the Kherson Oblast region, which had been partially liberated during the Kherson counteroffensive in late 2022. After the Destruction of the Kakhovka Dam, the DSNS was involved in the evacuation of more than 1,300 people, and he said 500 DSNS personnel from 11 oblasts of Ukraine were involved in the evacuation. On 25 August 2023, he was dismissed. He was reportedly dismissed due to an investigation by the Ministry of Internal Affairs following the court ruling in the Pecherskyi Court of Kyiv on the 2023 Brovary helicopter crash, which killed a number of high-ranking Ministry of Internal Affairs officials. After being dismissed, Kruk became a director of the separate unit of the emergency technical centre for the state enterprise Energoatom.

== Personal life ==
He is married to Olena Kruk (nee Krytska). Olena was, at least in 2015, a lieutenant colonel in a military enlistment office. They lived in Rivne and later Verkhivsk. According to his declaration, he has two daughters: Vladyslava and Valeria. In an interview with journalists, regarding his mother-in-law's extensive properties, Kruk said he was estranged from his wife.

== Honours and awards ==
Kruk has been awarded the following honours and awards:

- Major General of the Civil Defense Force (16 September 2016)
- Order of Danylo Halytsky (23 August 2021)
