= State Emergency Service of Ukraine =

Emergency response organization in Ukraine

State Emergency Service
- Державна служба з надзвичайних ситуацій
- Emblem of the State Emergency Service

- Flag of the State Emergency Service

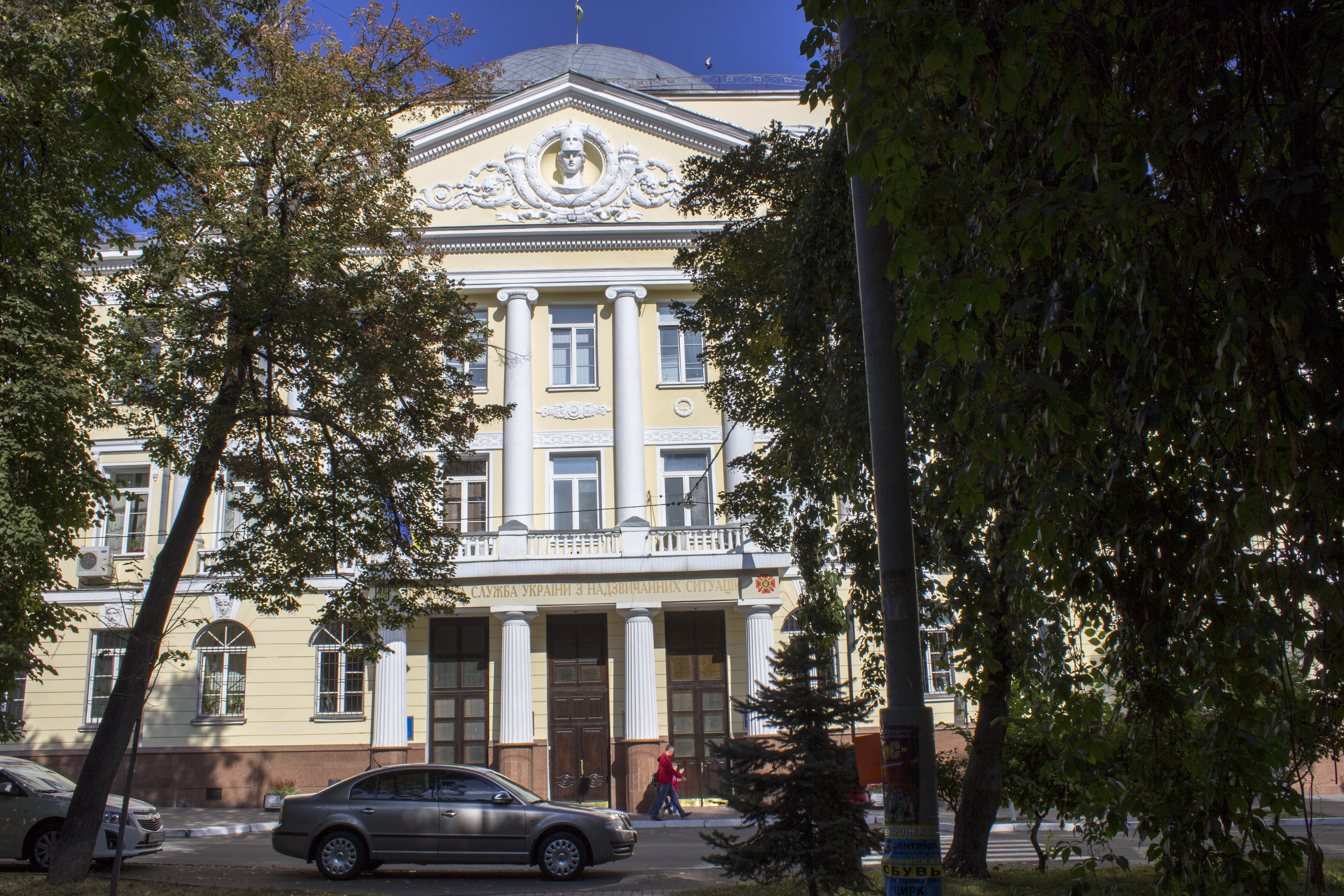
- Headquarters building, Kyiv

Agency overview
- Formed: 1991
- Preceding agencies: State Committee of the Ukrainian Soviet Socialist Republic government in protection of population from the consequences of the Chernobyl catastrophe; Ministry of Emergencies of Ukraine *Ministry of Ukraine in Emergencies and Affairs in Protection of Population from the Consequences of the Chernobyl Catastrophe
- Jurisdiction: Ukraine
- Headquarters: 55 Honchar St, Kyiv; 50°26′59″N 30°30′13″E
- Employees: ~60,000 in peace time
- Minister responsible: Ivan Vyhivskyi, Minister of Internal Affairs
- Agency executives: Head; Andrii Danyk
- Parent agency: Ministry of Internal Affairs
- Key document: Regulation on the State Emergency Service of Ukraine
- Website: Official website

The State Emergency Service of Ukraine (Ukrainian: Державна служба України з надзвичайних ситуацій, romanized: Derzhavna sluzhba Ukrainy z nadzvychainykh sytuatsii), until December 24, 2012 named the Ministry of Emergencies of Ukraine (Ukrainian: Міністерство надзвичайних ситуацій України, romanized: Ministerstvo nadzvychainykh sytuatsii Ukrainy) is the main executive body tasked with carrying out state policy in the spheres of civil defence, rescue, creating and managing the system of insurance fund documentation, utilization of radioactive wastes, protection of population and territory in emergency situations, emergency prevention and response, liquidation in the aftermath, and the Chernobyl catastrophe. They represent Ukraine's sole fire & rescue service.

It is abbreviated as ДСНС [України] (DSNS). It also directly administers the zone of alienation located just north of Kyiv.

Under the jurisdiction of the Ministry of Internal Affairs, the agency's motto is "To prevent. To rescue. To help." (Ukrainian: Запобігти. Врятувати. Допомогти)

== History ==
The former ministry was created in 1996 with the merger of the state civil defense body and the Ukrainian ministry in charge of protecting the population from the consequences of the Chernobyl catastrophe. Until 1991, the latter was a state committee of the Cabinet of Ministers of the Ukrainian SSR, while state civil defense was part of the USSR's All-Union civil defense network.

In 2003, the ministry took over control of the firefighting service, previously under the jurisdiction of the Ministry of Internal Affairs (militsiya). The ministry had been part of the military reserve of the Ukrainian armed forces, but after the 2003 reform and fire services merger, all militarized formations were dissolved, and in 2005, the agency became officially non-military and focused on rescue services.

Until the administrative reform of December 9, 2010, the body was called Ministry of Ukraine in emergencies and the protection of the population from the consequences of the Chernobyl disaster. After the reform, three major central executive power bodies were directly subordinated to it:

- State service of mining supervision and industrial safety of Ukraine (Ukrainian: Державна служба гірничого нагляду та промислової безпеки України, Russian: Государственная служба горного надзора и промышленной безопасности Украины)
- State agency of Ukraine of the administration of the zone of alienation (Ukrainian: Державне агентство України з управління зоною відчуження, Russian: Государственное агентство Украины по управлению зоной отчуждения)
- State inspection of technogenic safety of Ukraine (Ukrainian: Державна інспекція техногенної безпеки України, Russian: Государственная инспекция техногенной безопасности Украины)

Other agencies

- State department of fire-prevention security (see firefighting)
- State search and rescue aviation service: Ukraviaposhuk
- State hydro-meteorological service
- State department of the insurance documentation fund of the Ministry

On December 24, 2012, the Ministry of Emergencies of Ukraine was transformed into the State Emergency Service and placed under jurisdiction of the Ministry of Defence. On 25 April 2014, the service was transferred to the Ministry of Internal Affairs.

== Structure ==
=== Main body ===
- Central Bureau of Emergency Situations

=== Specialized formations ===
- State militarized mining rescue brigade (Kryvyi Rih)
- Dnipro militarized mining rescue brigade

=== Other agencies ===
- Ukrainian Hydro-meteorological Center
- Ukrainian Aviation Meteorological Center
- Main Aviation Coordination Center of search and rescue
- "Rescuer"-Inform Information Analytical Center
- Center of Civil Security 112
- Mobile Rescue Center (Kyiv)
- Odesa Sanatorium (Odesa)

=== Educational and research institutions ===
- National University of Civil Defense of Ukraine (Kharkiv)
  - Institute of Fire Safety "Heroes of Chernobyl" (Cherkasy)
- Lviv State University of Life Safety (Lviv)
  - Vinnytsia Higher Professional School of Civil Defense (Vinnytsia)
- Institute of Public Administration in the Sphere of Civil Defense (Kyiv)
- Ukrainian Research Institute of Civil Defense (Kyiv)
- Ukrainian Hydrometeorological Institute (Kyiv)

== List of heads of the State Emergency Service ==
Ministry	Name	Term of office	
Ministry	Name	Start	End
Emergency Minister	Davyd Zhvania	February 4, 2005	September 27, 2005
Emergency Minister	Viktor Baloha	September 27, 2005	October 5, 2006
Emergency Minister	Nestor Shufrych	October 5, 2006	?
Ministry of Defense	Mykhaylo Bolotskykh	December 24, 2012	March 2, 2014
Ministry of Defense; Ministry of Internal Affairs	Serhiy Bochkovsky	March 2, 2014	March 25, 2015
Ministry of Internal Affairs	Zoryan Shkiryak (acting)	March 25, 2015	May 14, 2015
Ministry of Internal Affairs	Mykola Chechotkin	May 14, 2015	November 10, 2021
Ministry of Internal Affairs	Serhii Kruk	November 12, 2021 (acting); February 16, 2022	August 25, 2023
Ministry of Internal Affairs	Volodymyr Demchuk (acting)	August 24, 2023	February 27, 2024
Ministry of Internal Affairs	Andrii Danyk	February 27, 2024	

=== Former agency executives (prior to 2012 reorganisation) ===
==== List of former chiefs of state civil defense ====
Prime-Minister(s)	Name	Term of office	
Prime-Minister(s)	Name	Start	End
Vitold Fokin, Leonid Kuchma, Vitali Masol	Mykola Bondarchuk	August 24, 1991	October 1993
Vitali Masol, Yevhen Marchuk, Pavlo Lazarenko	Lt.Gen. Viktor Grechaninov	October 1993	May 1997

==== List of ministers of emergencies ====
Prime-Minister(s)	Name	Term of office	
Prime-Minister(s)	Name	Start	End
Vitold Fokin, Leonid Kuchma, Vitaliy Masol	Heorhiy Hotovchyts	August 24, 1991	December 31, 1994
Vitaliy Masol, Yevhen Marchuk, Pavlo Lazarenko	Volodymyr Holosha	December 31, 1994	August 31, 1996
Pavlo Lazarenko, Valeriy Pustovoitenko	Valeriy Kalchenko	August 31, 1996	February 8, 1999
Valeriy Pustovoitenko, Viktor Yushchenko, Anatoli Kinakh, Viktor Yanukovych	Vasyl Durdynets	February 8, 1999	November 30, 2002
Viktor Yanukovych	Hryhoriy Reva	November 30, 2002	February 4, 2005
Yulia Tymoshenko, Yuri Yekhanurov	David Zhvaniya	February 4, 2005	September 27, 2005
Yuri Yekhanurov, Viktor Yanukovych	Viktor Baloha	September 27, 2005	September 15, 2006
Viktor Yanukovych	Nestor Shufrych	September 15, 2006	December 18, 2007
Yulia Tymoshenko	Volodymyr Shandra	December 18, 2007	March 11, 2010
Mykola Azarov	Nestor Shufrych	March 11, 2010	July 10, 2010
Mykola Azarov	Mykhailo Bolotskykh (acting)	July 10, 2010	November 12, 2010
Mykola Azarov	Viktor Baloha	November 12, 2010	20 November 2012

== Ranks ==
Rank group	General / flag officers				Senior officers			Junior officers
	Генерал служби цивільного захисту України; General of Emergency Services	Генерал-полковник; Colonel General	Генерал-лейтенант; Lieutenant General	Генерал-майор; Major General	Полковник; Colonel	Підполковник; Lieutenant Colonel	Майор; Major	Капітан; Kapitan	Старший лейтенант Senior lieutenant	Лейтенант; Leitenant	Молодший лейтенант Junior lieutenant	Kурсант; Kursant

Rank group	Senior NCOs		Junior NCOs	Enlisted
	Головний майстер-сержант Chief master sergeant	Майстер-сержант; Master sergeant	Сержант; Sergeant	Рядовий; Private

== Medals ==
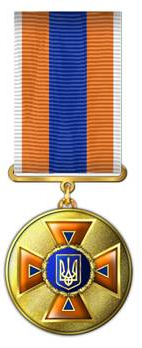
25 years in service

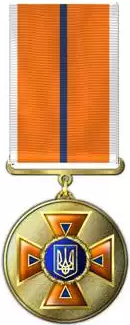
20 years in service

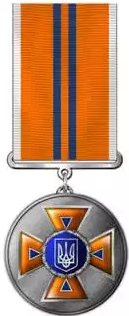
15 years in service

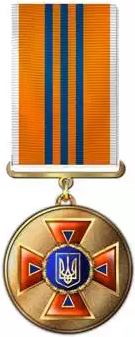
10 years in service

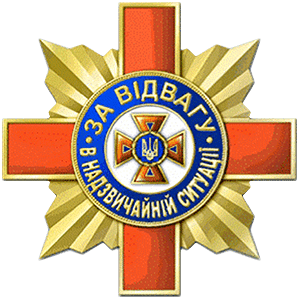
For bravery in an emergency

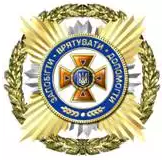
For honorable service

== State Emergency Service Aviation ==
The Special Aviation Unit and Operational Rescue Service of the State Emergency Service (Спеціальний авіаційний загін оперативно-рятувальної служби цивільного захисту) is based in the city of Nizhyn.

The Special Aviation Unit can work independently or in cooperation with other State Emergency Service units to protect population and territory, material and cultural values and the environment during emergencies, especially for work performed under difficult conditions.

Aircraft	Origin	Type	In service	Notes
Fixed-wing aircraft
An-32P	Ukraine	Aerial firefighting	4	
An-26	Ukraine	Transport Aircraft	3	
An-30	Ukraine	Aerial Surveillance and Aerial Photography	2	
Helicopters
Mi-8	Ukraine	Multipurpose Helicopter	14	
Eurocopter EC145	France	Medevac Helicopter		
Eurocopter H225	France	SAR	4	

== Gallery ==
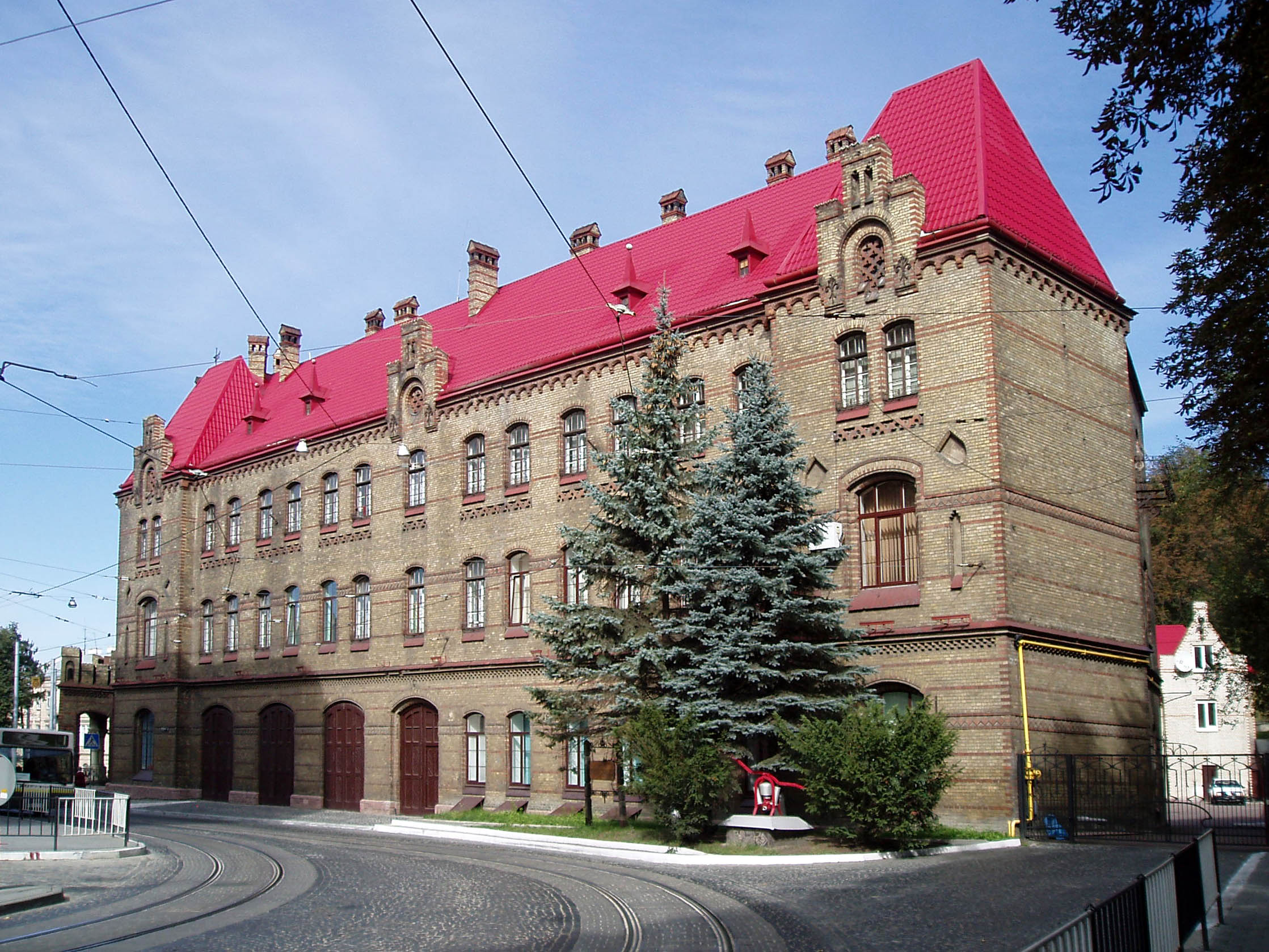
The main Lviv fire station

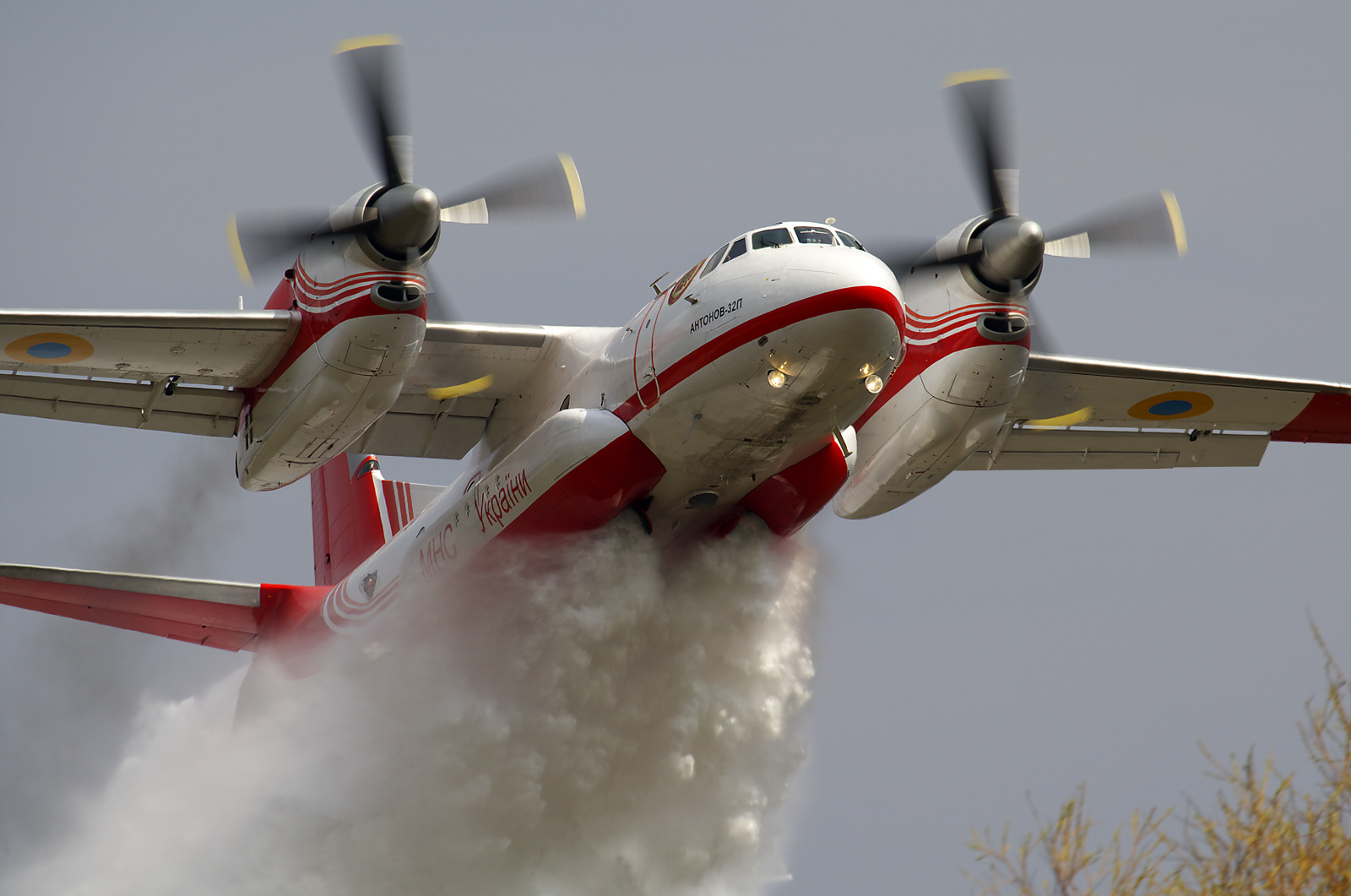
A State Emergency Service Antonov An-32 firefighting aircraft dropping water on a forest fire

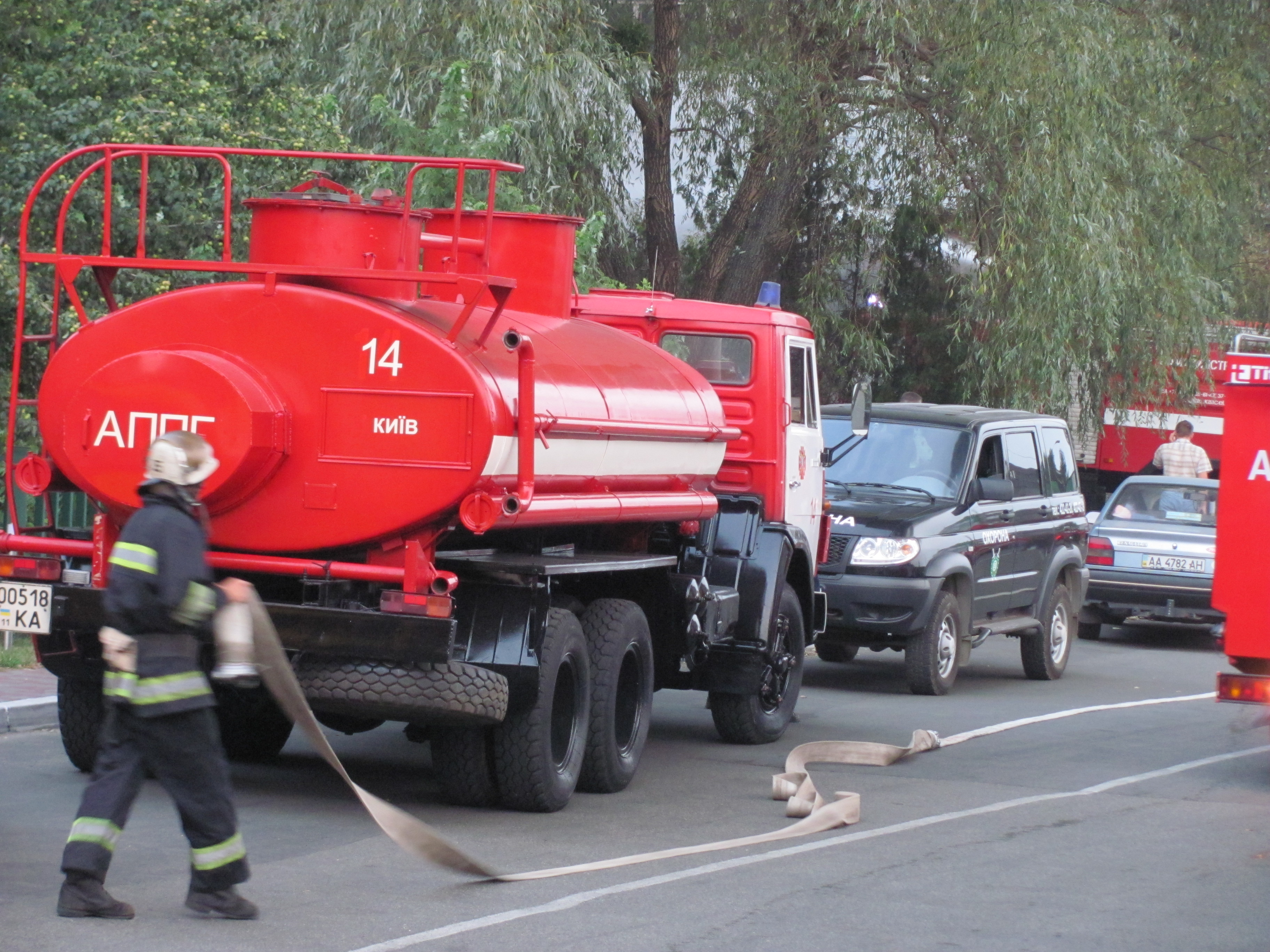
Fire engines and emergency service personnel responding to an incident in Kyiv, 2010

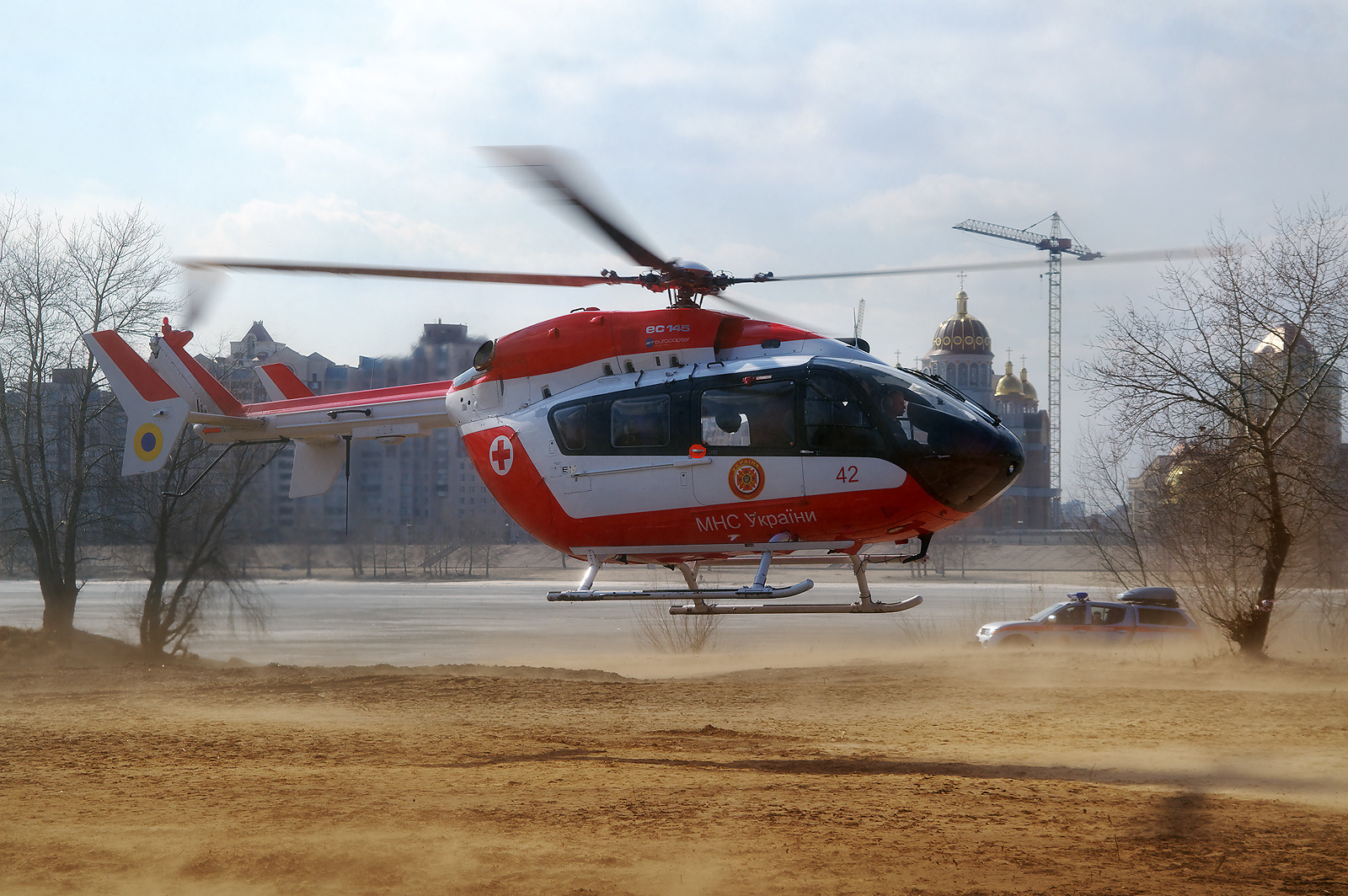
An Emergency Service EC145 helicopter landing in Kyiv

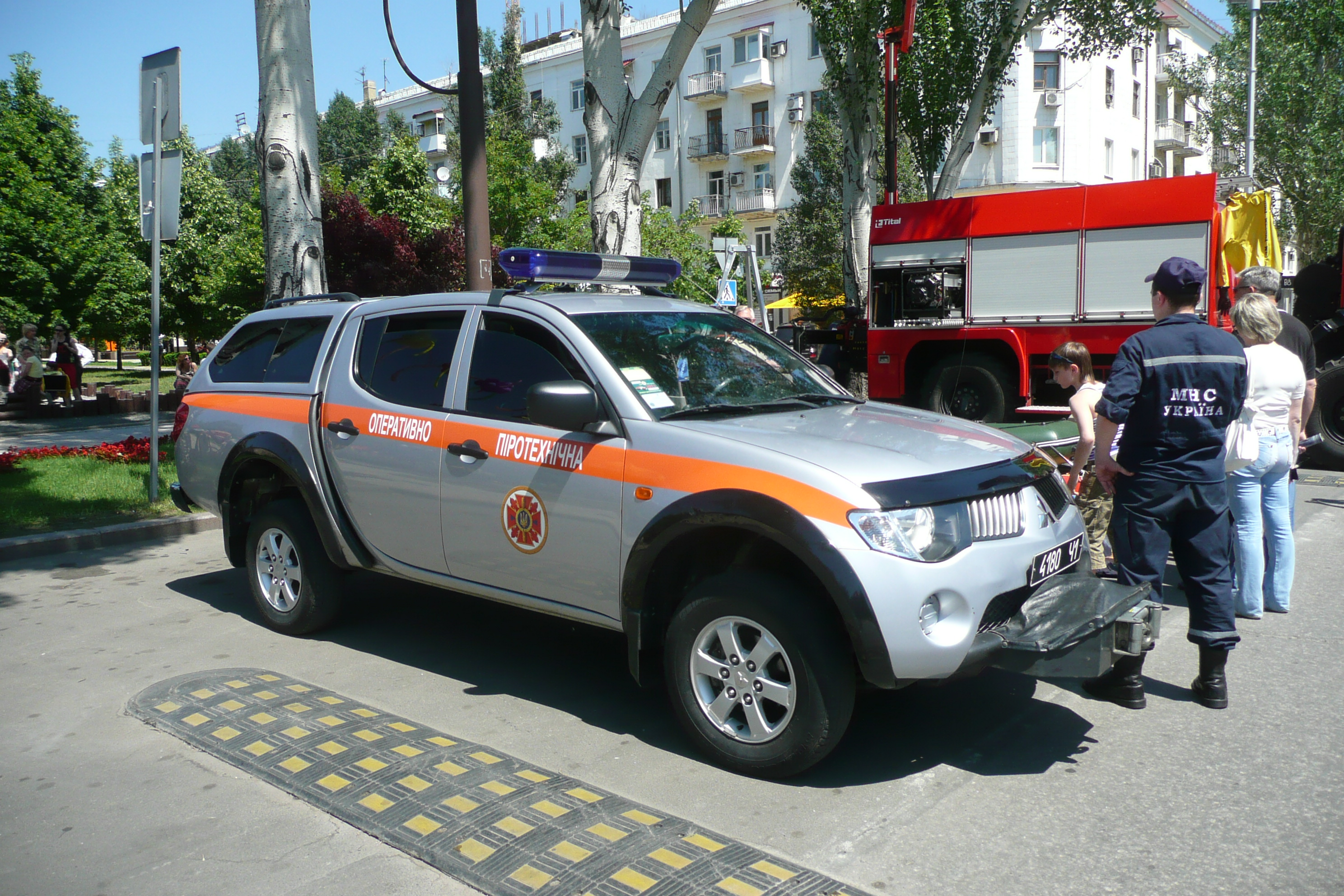
Emergency service equipment on display in Donetsk, 2011

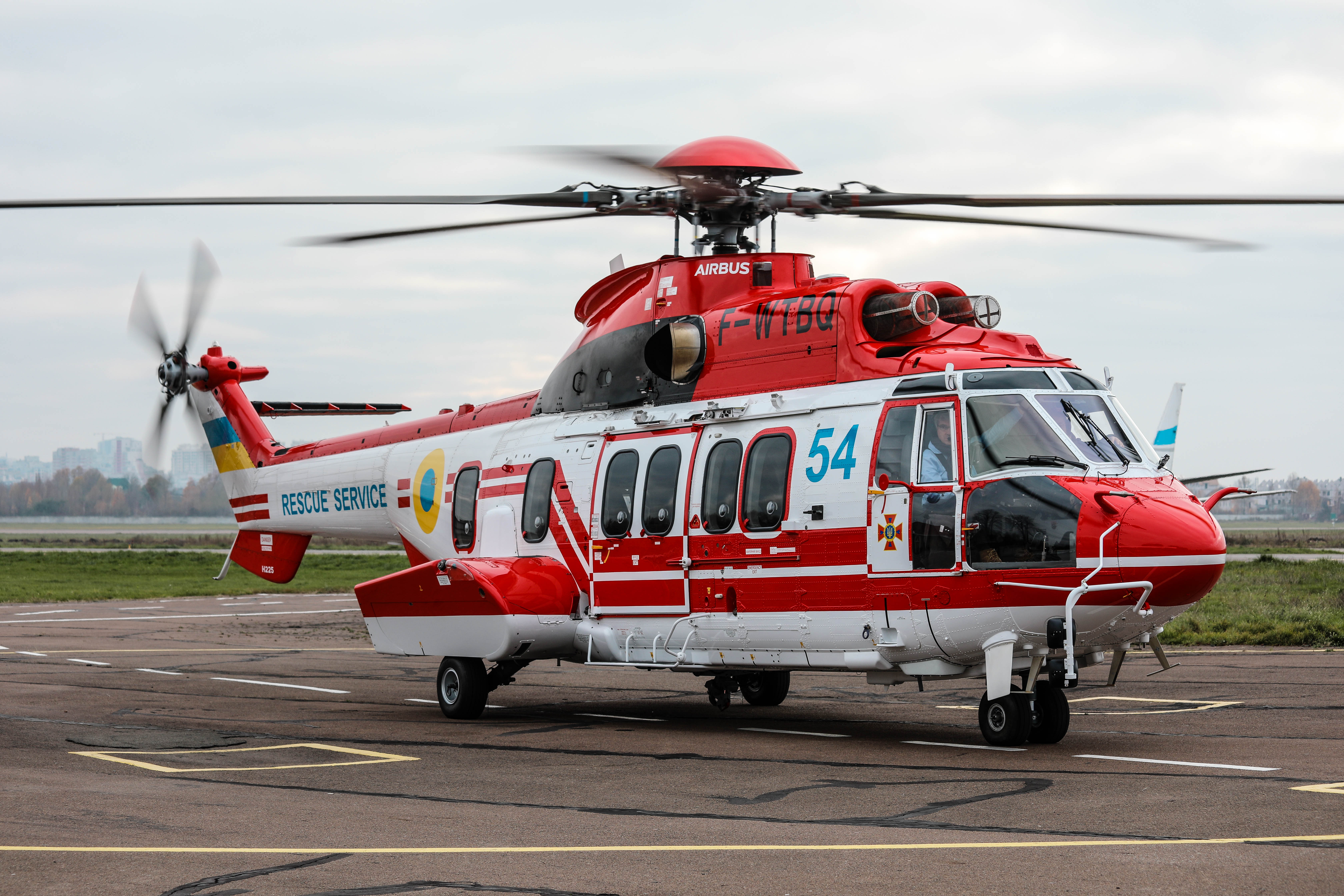
The EC225 Super Puma that crashed on January 18, 2023 killing Ukrainian Minister of Internal Affairs Denys Monastyrsky, his deputy Yevhen Yenin, State Secretary Yurii Lubkovych and 11 other people photographed in November 2020

== See also ==
- Fire protection
- Fire safety
- Firefighting
- Search and rescue
- State Emergency Service
