= Christian Bloc =

Electoral bloc in Ukraine

The Christian Bloc (Ukrainian: Християнський блок) is an electoral bloc in Ukraine. In the 30 September 2007 elections, the bloc failed to win parliamentary representation, winning 0,10% of the votes.

Member parties:

- Social-Christian Party
- All-Ukrainian Political Party "Ecology and Social Protection"
