= Social Christian Party (Ukraine) =

Political party in Ukraine

The Social-Christian Party (Ukrainian: Соціально-християнська партія, romanized: Sotsialno-khrystyianska partiia) is a political party in Ukraine registered in July 2004.

The party participated independently in the 2006 parliamentary elections winning 0.09% of the votes and no seats.

In the 30 September 2007 elections, the party failed again as part of the Christian Bloc to win parliamentary representation.

The party was reported to merge with United Centre in October 2008; however it continued to exist.

The party competed on one single party under "umbrella" party "Fatherland", together with several other parties, during the 2012 parliamentary elections During the election this list won 62 seats (25.55% of the votes) under the proportional party-list system and another 39 by winning 39 simple-majority constituencies; a total of 101 seats in Parliament.

In the 2014 Ukrainian parliamentary election the participated in 1 constituency; but its candidate lost and thus the party won no parliamentary seats.
