= Ivan Sydor =

Ukrainian church and public figure, theologian, teacher

- Іван Сидор
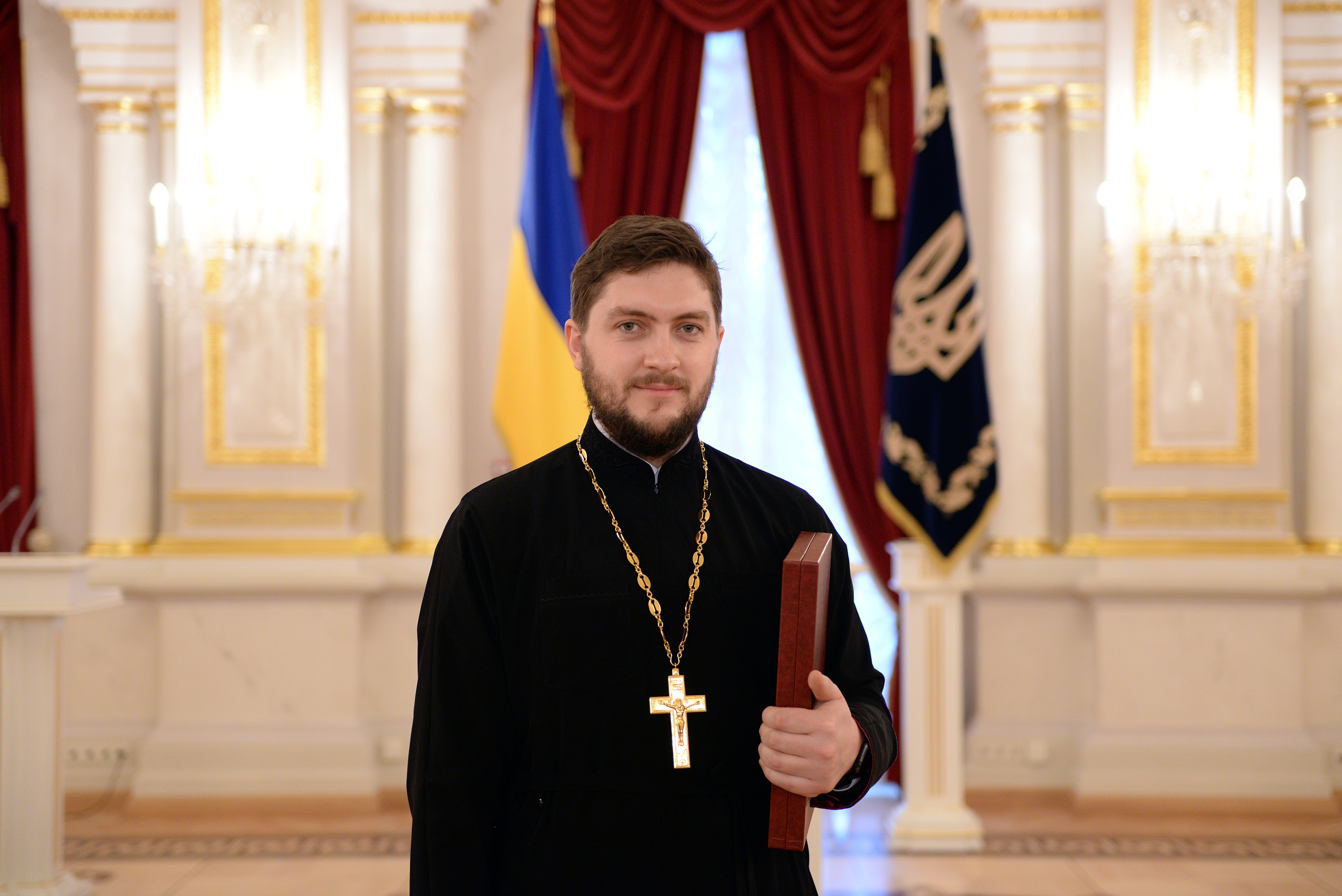
- Born: Ivan Andriiovych Sydor; January 19, 1989 (age 37); Sokal, Lviv Oblast
- Education: Kyiv Orthodox Theological Academy, Taras Shevchenko National University of Kyiv
- Awards: Order of Merit

Ivan Andriiovych Sydor (Ukrainian: Іван Андрійович Сидор, born 19 January 1989, Sokal, Lviv Oblast) is a Ukrainian church and public figure, theologian, teacher, Candidate of Sciences in Theology (2014).

Lecturer at the Kyiv Orthodox Theological Academy; staff priest at the Refectory Church of St. Sophia of Kyiv (Little, Warm Sophia); Secretary-Reference Officer of the Kyiv Metropolis of the Ukrainian Orthodox Church (OCU), acting Head of the Synodal Publishing and Educational Department; editor-in-chief of the Pomisna Tserkva magazine (2019). Participant of the Unification Council (2018, Kyiv). A bell ringer on the Euromaidan (2013).

== Biography ==
Since childhood, he served in the church.

He studied at the Horokhiv Secondary School-Gymnasium (2006) and at the Music School (2004, accordion class). Every year he took part in the bell-ringing competition in Lutsk, which took place in the Lubart's Castle.

He graduated from the Kyiv Orthodox Theological Academy (2011) and the Faculty of History of Taras Shevchenko National University of Kyiv (2014).

On the night of 11 December 2013, he, then a graduate student at the Kyiv Orthodox Theological Academy, woke Kyiv with the bells of St. Michael's Monastery for the first time since the Tatar-Mongol invasion in 1240 to stop another attempt to disperse Euromaidan.

== Awards ==
- Order of Merit, 3rd class (20 February 2019)
