= Maidan People's Union =

All-Ukrainian Union "Maidan" Всеукраїнське об'єднання «Майдан»
- Leader: Yulia Tymoshenko, Arseniy Yatsenyuk, Vitali Klitschko, Oleh Tyahnybok, Serhiy Kvit, Yuriy Lutsenko and Ruslana
- Founded: 22 December 2013
- Dissolved: 22 February 2014
- Ideology: Pro-Europeanism; European integration Ukrainian nationalism Factions: Anti-Russian sentiment Ultranationalism
- Political position: Big tent
- Members: Batkivshchyna; UDAR; Svoboda; Automaidan; Vidsich; European Party; Right Sector; UNA-UNSO; And others...
- Colours: Blue; Yellow

Party flag

Website
- maidan2013.com.ua

The Maidan People's Union (Note: renamed All-Ukrainian Union 'Maidan') (Ukrainian: Народне об'єднання "Майдан", romanized: Narodne obiednannya "Maidan") was an alliance in Ukraine formed by several political parties and non-partisan individuals and public organizations on the fifth Sunday (22 December 2013) of the Euromaidan-protests with the aim of "building a new Ukraine and a new Ukrainian government" by creating a new Ukrainian constitution, and removing corrupt judges and prosecutors. It also aimed to organize opposition to the former regime led by the now disposed president Viktor Yanukovych and to coordinate a protest movement in all regions of the country. In practice this means broadening support for the goals of the organization in the pro-government and pro-presidential heartland Eastern Ukraine.

During Euromaidan, the organization aimed to recruit millions of Ukrainians as members. According to co-head of the organization Arseniy Yatsenyuk, "it will be a little bit like the Solidarity movement in Poland".

== History ==
On 30 November 2013 the opposition parties Batkivshchyna, UDAR and Svoboda set up the National Resistance Headquarters. At the time they controlled 168 seats of the 450 in the Verkhovna Rada (Ukraine's national parliament).

On 22 December 2013, the fifth ongoing week of the Euromaidan-protests (100,000 rallied in Kyiv) major opposition parties and non-partisans established a nationwide political movement called Maidan. "Maidan" refers to/is the nickname of Maidan Nezalezhnosti where the Euromaidan-protests are centered. The movement has the aim of broadening support for Euromaidan in Eastern Ukraine where the support for the second Azarov government and President Viktor Yanukovych is centred. (At the first day of the movement) opposition leader Arseniy Yatsenyuk stated "Every person who wants a fair and honest future must be in favour of this movement". Since 24 December 2013 the organization started to accept membership.

== Agenda ==
The organization set several goals:

- the formation of a new Constitution of Ukraine "that should make the Ukrainian people feel that they run the country"
- the formation of an action plan for Ukraine by forming groups for each policy sector, ranging from economical to foreign policy
- the formation of groups that provide legal, financial and organizational support to Euromaidan activists who are persecuted for participating in protests, particularly in Kharkiv and Odesa
- "participation and protection" of the 2014 Ukrainian presidential election
- establishing its branches in 20 regions (Note: Ukraine is subdivided into 27 regions: 24 oblasts, Autonomous Republic of Crimea and two cities with special status.)
- a strategy of Ukraine's development until 2025

== Organization ==
Co-heads of the organization are Yulia Tymoshenko and Arseniy Yatsenyuk of Batkivshchyna, Vitali Klitschko of UDAR, Oleh Tyahnybok of Svoboda, President of National University of Kyiv-Mohyla Academy Serhiy Kvit, leader of the organization Third Ukrainian Republic Yuriy Lutsenko and singer Ruslana

The council of the organization includes Taras Boiko, Oleksiy Haran, Vasyl Hatsko, Ihor Zhdanov, Andriy Illyenko, Irena Karpa, Serhiy Kvit, Vyacheslav Kyrylenko, Ihor Koliushko, Vitali Klitschko, Ruslan Koshulynskyi, Ivan Krulko, Ruslana, Ihor Lutsenko, Yuriy Lutsenko, Maria Matios, Andriy Mokhnyk, Valeriy Patskan, Oleh Osukhovskyi, Oleksandr Polozhynskyi, Petro Poroshenko, Vitaly Portnikov, Serhiy Rakhmanin, Yehor Soboliev, Serhiy Sobolyev, Oleksandr Sushko, Viktoria Siumar, Borys Tarasyuk, Yulia Tymoshenko, Oleksandr Turchynov, Oleh Tyahnybok, Valeriy Chaly, Refat Chubarov, Viktor Chumak, Zoryan Shkiryak, Yelyzaveta Schepetylnykova, and Arseniy Yatsenyuk.
