= Ihor Lutsenko (politician) =

Ukrainian journalist and politician

- Ігор Луценко
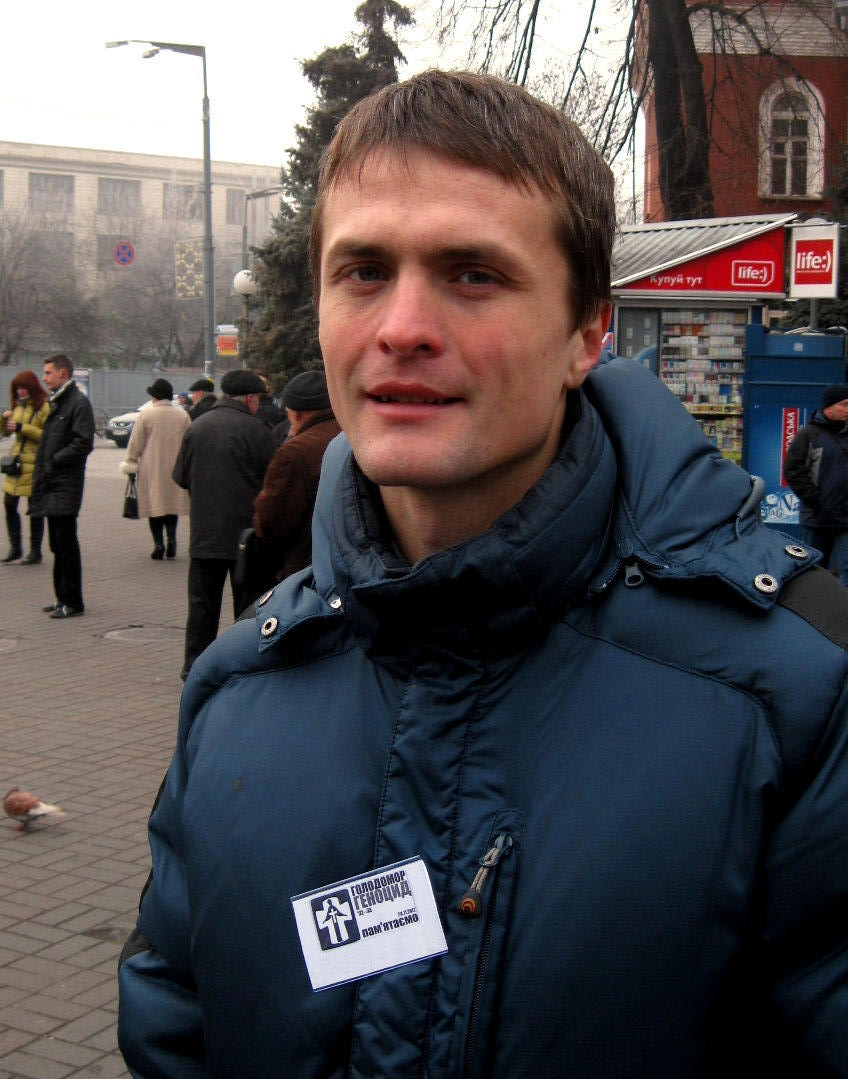
- Lutsenko in 2012

People's Deputy of Ukraine
- In office 27 November 2014 – 24 July 2019

Personal details
- Born: 10 November 1978 (age 48) Kyiv, Ukrainian SSR, Soviet Union
- Party: All-Ukrainian Union "Fatherland"
- Education: National University of Kyiv-Mohyla Academy
- Awards: Order for Courage 3d class

Ihor Viktorovych Lutsenko (Ukrainian: Ігор Вікторович Луценко; born 10 November 1978) is a Ukrainian journalist and politician.

== Early life ==
Lutsenko was born on 10 November 1978 in Kyiv, which was then part of the Ukrainian SSR in the Soviet Union. In 2002, he received a master's degree from the Kyiv School of Economics.

Prior to entering politics, Lutsenko worked a variety of jobs. He was a consultant to the International Centre for Policy Studies. He was then a journalist, working as an editor for the magazine "Companion", the section "Big Money" of the newspaper "The Power of Money", the business section of Korrespondent, editor-in-chief of "Ekonomichna Pravda", and finally for Ukrainska Pravda.

== Political career ==
He first became politically active after becoming one of the founders of "Save Old Kyiv", a public movement to preserve the historical areas of Kyiv. He then ran as an independent candidate in the Verkhovna Rada during the 2012 Ukrainian parliamentary election for the 223rd constituency, but withdrew his candidacy in favour of Yuriy Levchenko.

Lutsenko took part in the Euromaidan protests in Kyiv. During the start of the Euromaidan protests, he became a deputy commandant of the protest camp in Kyiv, and was a member of the Maidan People's Union. In January 2014, he was abducted and beaten along with Yuriy Verbytsky who died. In April 2021, the Boryspil City District Court of the Kyiv Oblast announced they had sentenced the suspect in the cases, Oleksandr Volkov, to nine years in prison. In 2026 Serhiy Myslyvyi, another participant of Lutsenko and Verbytskyi's abduction and torture, was sentenced to 12 years of imprisonment.

In 2014, he was elected to the Verkhovna Rada on the party list of Batkivshchyna. In the 2019 Ukrainian parliamentary election, he lost reelection for this party in constituency 154 (Rivne Oblast). In October 2019 Lutsenko became an adviser to the Mayor of Kyiv Vitali Klitschko.

== Military service ==
He briefly served as a member of the Azov Brigade during the War in Donbas before he joined parliament.

Following the 2022 Russian invasion of Ukraine, Lutsenko joined the 72nd Mechanized Brigade. Since 2023, he has been an instructor of the combat detachment of the 190th training center, and he obtained the rank of sergeant.

== Awards ==
- On 3 May 2022 President Volodymyr Zelenskyy awarded Ihor Lutsenko with Order for Courage for his participation starting from Spring 2014 in the Russo-Ukrainian war mostly for his impact as operator of drones in deterring Russian aggressors first of all during the Battle of Kyiv. Lutsenko is a member of the 72nd Mechanized Brigade.
