= Yuliy Ioffe =

Ukrainian politician (born 1940)

- Юлій Іоффе
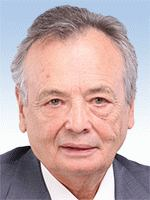
- A picture of him from 2019.

People's Deputy of Ukraine
- Incumbent
- Assumed office 29 August 2019
- Constituency: Opposition Platform — For Life, No. 12 (Note: The party has been banned since 2022.)
- In office 27 November 2014 – 29 August 2019
- Constituency: Luhansk Oblast, No. 112
- In office 12 December 2012 – 27 November 2014
- Constituency: Luhansk Oblast, No. 112
- In office 14 May 2002 – 25 May 2006
- Constituency: Luhansk Oblast, No. 112
- In office 12 May 1998 – 14 May 2002
- Constituency: Luhansk Oblast, No. 111
- In office 24 July 1994 – 12 May 1998
- Constituency: Luhansk Oblast, No. 248
- In office 10 May 1990 – 15 May 1994
- Constituency: Luhansk Oblast, No. 55

Personal details
- Born: Yuliy Yakovlevich Ioffe; 10 December 1940 (age 85) Voroshilovgrad, Ukrainian SSR, Soviet Union (now Luhansk, Ukraine)
- Party: Independent (1990-1998, 1998-1999, 2005); People's Democratic Party (1998); Labour Ukraine (1999-2005); Party of Industrialists and Entrepreneurs of Ukraine (2005); Republican Party of Ukraine (2005,2006); Social Democratic Party of Ukraine (united) (2005-2006); Party of Regions (2012-2014); Opposition Bloc (2014-2018); Opposition Platform - For Life (2018-2022); Platform for Life and Peace (2022-present)
- Education: Kommunarsk Mining and Metallurgical Institute (1964)

Yuliy Yakovlevich Ioffe (Ukrainian: Юлій Якович Іоффе; born 10 December 1940) is a Ukrainian politician and miner who has served as a longtime politician in Luhansk Oblast, having been elected a People's Deputy of Ukraine in the Verkhovna Rada continuously from 1990 to 2006 and again from 2012 to present. He was last re-elected during the 2019 Ukrainian parliamentary elections with the Opposition Platform — For Life (OPZZh), and has continued to serve because no new elections have been declared due to martial law as a result of the 2022 Russian invasion of Ukraine. Outside of parliament, he also served as Chairman of the Republican Party of Ukraine in 2005 and as Vice Prime Minister of Ukraine for the Fuel and Energy Complex from 1992 to 1993.

== Early life ==
Ioffe was born on 10 December 1940 in the city of what was then Voroshilovgrad (now Luhansk), which was part of the Ukrainian SSR in the Soviet Union at the time of his birth. He is ethnically Jewish. After graduation, Ioffe worked as a locksmith at the Kommunarsk Metal Plant in what was then part Kommunarsk (now Alchevsk) in 1957. In 1959, he moved to becoming a motor operator at the mine "Ukraine" in Perevalsk, which he did for two more years until 1961. He then briefly left the industry in order to pursue higher education, and he graduated from the Kommunarsk Mining and Metallurgical Institute in 1964 with a specialisation as a mining engineer and electromechanic.

Upon returning to the workforce, he moved to the "1-bis" mine in Krasnodon in 1965, becoming a section mechanic, then assistant chief mechanic. A year later, he left the job when he was appointed chief power engineer at the Sukhodilska Mine No. 1 in Sukhodilsk. He again moved after one year in 1967 to become chief mechanic at the "Duvanna-2" mine, which is also in Sukhodilsk. Ioffe remained there nearly a decade until 1976, when he was appointed Head of the Department for Equipping Mine Shafts of the Krasnodon Mining Administration. He remained in this role for another three years until he was eventually appointed Head of the Krasnodon Mine-Tunneling Administration. Ioffe left the post after a year in 1980 to then become director of the "Hirska" mine in Hirske, where he stayed until 1989, when he was appointed general director of the "Stakhanovvugillya" production association.

== Political career ==
=== 1990-2006: First run in the Verkhovna Rada ===
Ioffe during his first term in the Verkhovna Rada, 1990.

In 1990, Ioffe entered politics, running in the first relatively free elections in the Ukrainian SSR, the 1990 Ukrainian Supreme Soviet election. He ran for constituency No. 55, which represented the city of Brianka and its surroundings in Luhansk Oblast, and was thus successfully elected. Upon joining the Rada, he became a member of the Commission on Social Policy and Labour and was a member of the parliamentary group "Industrialists". He was re-elected during the first elections after Ukrainian independence, the 1994 Ukrainian parliamentary elections, this time for constituency No. 248, which represented Rubizhne, having been nominated by a labour collective. Upon being successfully re-elected, he became a member of the Committee on Fuel and Energy Complex and also joined the parliamentary group "Constitutional Centre" (which helped draft the Constitution of Ukraine). Ioffe ran for a third time in 1998 during the subsequent 1998 Ukrainian parliamentary elections, and was re-elected in constituency No. 111. After joining the third convocation, he became a member of the People's Democratic Party (NDP) faction in parliament until he eventually left to become an independent again. He joined the Labour Ukraine group in 1999, and later also became Chairman of the Committee on State Building and Local Self-Government in February 2000.

He was re-elected to the 4th convocation during the 2002 Ukrainian parliamentary elections, this time representing constituency No. 112, also in Luhansk Oblast. He won with 30.19% of the vote against 10 other candidates. During the fourth convocation, which lasted until 2006, he frequently changed parties going from, in order: Labour Ukraine, For United Ukraine, back to both Labour Ukraine and the PPPU, then fully Labour Ukraine, and then back to the NDP, then back to the PPPU, and then back to being an independent, and finally he settled on the Social Democratic Party of Ukraine (united) group in December 2005. His first run in parliament was ended when, during the 2006 Ukrainian parliamentary elections, he ran on the party list of the pro-Russian Ne Tak after defecting from the SPDU(u). He was placed No. 12 on Ne Tak's list, and thus was not re-elected because Ne Tak failed to overcome the electoral barrier of 3% (it got 1.03% during the 2006 elections).

=== 2012-present: Second run in the Verkhovna Rada ===
In 2012, Ioffe returned to national politics. He announced his intention to return to politics in the newspaper Sievierodonetsk Chemist, and he was popularly considered part of the electoral group led by the oligarchs Yuriy Boyko and Dmytro Firtash. His race was initially expected to be competitive, as he was running within constituency No. 106, which included both the twin cities of Rubizhne and Sievierodonetsk, which Oleksii Kunchenko had wanted to hold. However, unexpectedly, just before the election season started to ramp up, it was announced that the constituency in which both were running, No. 106, would be split. After the split, a new constituency, No. 112, was created, which Ioffe decided to run in while Kunchenko remained in No. 106. The new constituency was based in Rubizhne and also included the cities of Brianka and Kirovsk (now Holubivka), alongside parts of the Popasna Raion and Pervomaisk Raion. The separation caused some discourse, as some commissions believed that the constituency 112 was created specifically in the interests of Ioffe, especially since Rubizhne and the city of Brianka (which he had represented all the way back in 1990) were about 100 km apart and were separated by two other constituencies. In addition to Ioffe, the former mayor of Rubizhne, Kostyantyn Kozyuberda, registered as a self-nominated candidate, alongside former People's Deputy Serhiy Sinchenko and the chairman of Chernobyl victims from Pervomaisk, Mykola Kostev. During the election campaign, a popular rumour went around about the death of Ioffe due to his age, which led to the opening of a criminal case. He was ultimately re-elected with 46.88% (38,198 people) of the vote, with Alexander Bukhalov in second at 26.64%.

After the premature end of the 2012 convocation, the snap 2014 Ukrainian parliamentary elections were held. Parts of the constituency were now under the control of the pro-Russian, separatist Luhansk People's Republic, including most notably the cities of Kirovsk and Brianka, although its seat, Rubizhne, which was further north in the oblast, was not. Thus, he ran for re-election with the Opposition Bloc, with Serhiy Fil from the Petro Poroshenko Bloc being one of his main competitors. According to exit polls by the Luhansk Oblast CVU, Ioffe was projected to win with 40% of the vote compared to other competitors like Constantin Kozyuberdu and Iurie Țibuliu, as of October. True to the polls, he won re-election with 48.62% of the vote against 12 other candidates. In 2019, he decided not to re-run in the 112th constituency during the 2019 Ukrainian parliamentary elections, even though it was still under Ukrainian control, and instead opted to be on the party list of the Opposition Platform - For Life, where he was placed 12th. Thus, he was successfully reelected. On 20 March 2022, his party, the Opposition Platform, was suspended for the period of martial law due to having ties with Russia, and on 14 April, the faction in the Rada was dissolved. After it was dissolved, OPZZh leader, Yuriy Boyko, created a new parliamentary group called the Platform for Life and Peace (PFLM), which was allowed to exist after a number of pro-Russian politicians from OPZZh did not join. Ioffe joined the PFLM, and was one of 25 deputies from the former OPZZh to do so.

=== Other positions ===
In October 1992, Ioffe was appointed one of the Vice Prime Ministers of Ukraine, specifically within the realm of the fuel and energy complex under President Leonid Kravchuk. Most of his term in the post was spent dealing with the ongoing 1990s Donbas miners' strikes. He also led the government in importing Russian crude oil and petroleum products. He was dismissed from the post by Kravchuk to be reappointed in June 1993. After this, he was reassigned to be the head of the trade and economic mission to the Embassy of Ukraine, Washington, D.C.. After just one year in the position, he was instead appointed a freelance adviser to the new President of Ukraine, Leonid Kuchma, on the topics of fuel and energy, a position he held up until January 2000. Simultaneously, he became a member of the political executive committee of Labour Ukraine and secretary of the party for analytical work from 1999 to 2000. Upon both positions ending, he was reappointed Chairman of the Political Council for Labour Ukraine, a position he would hold for another four years. From 2004-05, he then served as a confidant for Viktor Yanukovych in constituency No. 113. After Yanukovych's election was defeated in the wake of the Orange Revolution, Ioffe was appointed Chairman of the minor Republican Party of Ukraine (RPU) in 2005. As chairman, Ioffe said he would focus on Donetsk Oblast and supported the then-Governor of Donetsk Oblast, Vadym Chuprun, during his time in office. Ioffe also spoke against the arrest of Party of Regions member Borys Kolesnikov, and confirmed that the RPU, in his beliefs, was not merely a political rump of Labour Ukraine whose members had defected over. He was dismissed in the post last that year. From 2006 to 2007, Ioffe was also briefly Acting Deputy Minister of the Ministry of Energy, subordinated to Yuriy Boyko.

== Political positions ==
In 2005, after becoming Chairman of the Republican Party of Ukraine, Ioffe rejected accusations that he supported either the opposition or the pro-European Viktor Yushchenko government. Ioffe said that although he was a confidant of Yanukovych in the 2004 Ukrainian presidential elections, he thought that Yanukovych had failed to become a true national leader and for ignoring his voters by going to Russia while his supports were shocked by the Orange Revolution. He also said that he left Labour Ukraine because the party leader, Serhiy Tihipko, had "chickened out" and left for Switzerland after the presidential elections also. In that same interview, he advocated for constitutional reform and called Yuschenko's presidency an "absolute monarchy" without the ability to impeach him, and said it was even similar to the presidency of Leonid Kuchma (who Ioffe had previously supported and served under). He also proposed doing binding referendums for national issues like joining NATO, the EU, or the status of the Russian language.

Upon Ioffe rejoining the Rada in 2012, he was absent from the consideration of the European integration bills in October 2013. Like most of the Party of Regions, he voted along party lines and approved the so-called "laws on dictatorship". In 2018, he was one of 36 deputies to vote against the law that recognised Ukrainian sovereignty over Luhansk and Donetsk Oblast during the War in the Donbas. Two years later, in August 2020, he also submitted to the Constitutional Court of Ukraine, together with other deputies of the Opposition Platform, that deputies should not have to be obligated to declare their property, which was seen as a step in violating European integration. In 2025, he voted for Draft Law 12414, a highly controversial bill that was accused by protesters of "effectively destroying" the power of two of Ukraine's anti-corruption bodies.

== Personal life ==
He is married to Lyubov Ivanovna; they have two sons.

== Honours and awards ==
Ioffe has been awarded the following honours:

- Medal "Veteran of Labour"
- Order of the Badge of Honour
- Order of Merit, III degree (June 1997)
- Order of Prince Yaroslav the Wise, 5th degree (December 2000)
- Certificate of Honour from the Cabinet of Ministers of Ukraine
- Certificate of Honour from the Verkhovna Rada
- Honourary citizen of Sievierodonetsk (2005, revoked by the city council in January 2025)
