= Yuliya Lyovochkina =

Ukrainian politician

- Юлія Льовочкіна
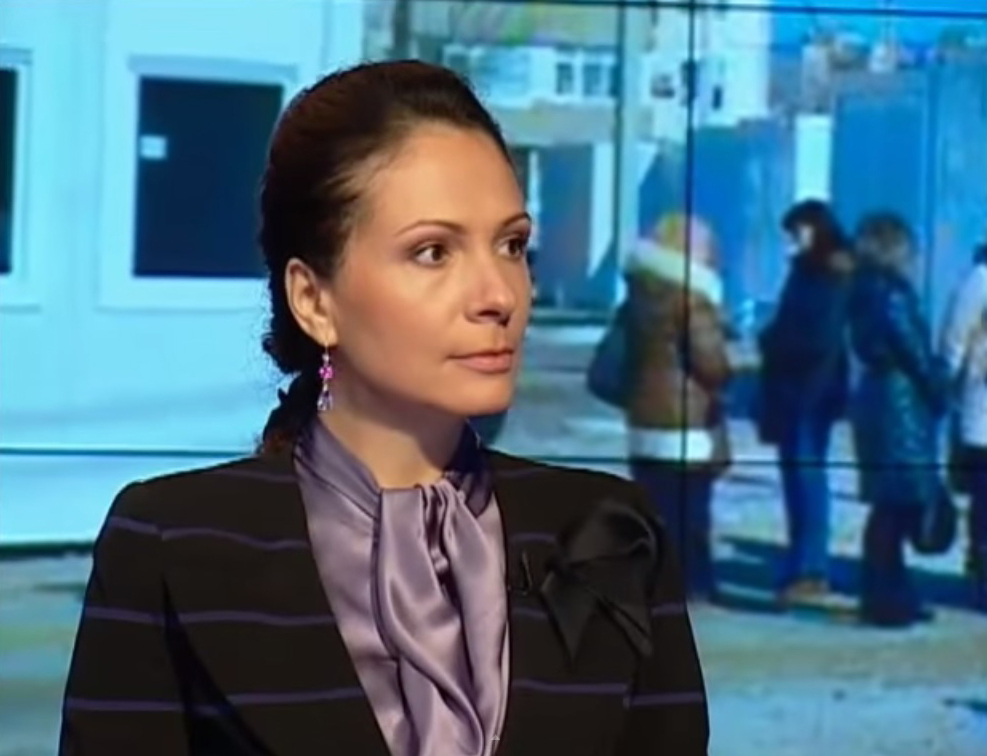

People's Deputy of Ukraine
- In office 23 November 2007 – 1 December 2022

Personal details
- Born: 17 February 1977 (age 49) Kyiv, Ukrainian SSR, Soviet Union (now Kyiv, Ukraine)
- Party: Platform for Life and Peace
- Other political affiliations: Party of Regions (2007-2013); Opposition Bloc (2014-2019); Opposition Platform — For Life (2019-2022)
- Education: Faculty of Law of Taras Shevchenko National University of Kyiv; University of Manitoba

Yuliya Volodymyrivna Lyovochkina (Ukrainian: Юлія Володимирівна Льовочкіна; born 17 February 1977) is a Ukrainian politician who was a People's Deputy, having served in the Verkhovna Rada from 2007 to 2022. Formerly a member of the Party of Regions, Opposition Bloc, and Opposition Platform — For Life, she is a member of Platform for Life and Peace.

== Early life and career ==
Lyovochkina was born on 17 February 1977, the daughter of Volodymyr Lyovochkin and sister of Serhiy Lyovochkin. She graduated from the Faculty of Law of Taras Shevchenko National University of Kyiv in 1999. A year later, she graduated from the University of Manitoba with a degree in economics. From 2001 to 2007, she worked as an analyst in the banking sector. She also chaired the supervisory board of one of the regional food conglomerates.

== Political career ==
In 2007, Lyovochkina was placed on the 105th place on the national list of the Party of Regions, then she obtained a parliamentary mandate. In 2012, she successfully ran for re-election in the single-seat constituency of the Autonomous Republic of Crimea. In April 2014, she left the PR faction, and in September of that year joined the Opposition Bloc, a party of Euromaidan opponents, which her brother initiated. On behalf of this party, in October 2014 she was elected to the Verkhovna Rada for the third time in a row. She was also elected to parliament in 2019, representing the Opposition Platform – For Life. On 30 November 2022, she resigned from her mandate. Her resignation was accepted the following day.

== Personal life ==
Lyovochkina was married to Arseniy Novikov with whom she has a son and a daughter from her first marriage. On 10 June 2014, she gave birth to her second daughter from Andriy Vinhranovskyi. On 7 April 2016, she gave birth to twin sons.
