= Lyovochkin =

Lyovochkin (Ukrainian: Льовочкін) is a surname, its feminine counterpart is Lyovochkina. People with the surname include:

- Serhiy Lyovochkin (born 1972), Ukrainian politician, brother of Yuliya
- Yuliya Lyovochkina (born 1977), Ukrainian politician, sister of Serhiy
