= Nestor Shufrych =

Ukrainian politician

- Нестор Шуфрич
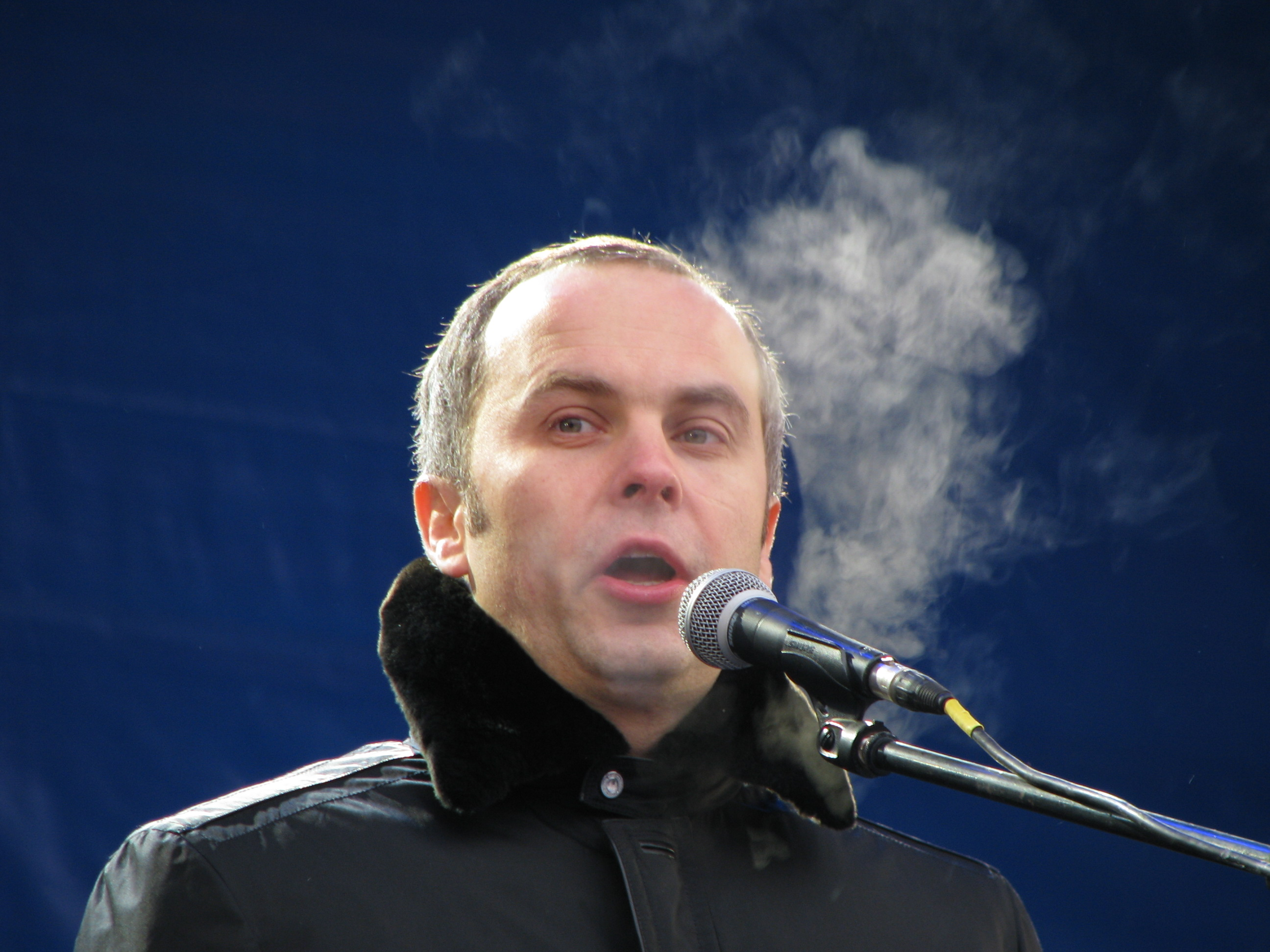
- Shufrych in 2010

People's Deputy of Ukraine
- Incumbent
- In office 23 November 2007 – 19 January 2025
- Constituency: Party of Regions, No. 4 (2007–2010); Multi-member district, No. 27 (2012–2014); Multi-member district, No. 8 (2014–2019); Opposition Platform — For Life, No. 7 (2019–2025)
- In office 12 May 1998 – 25 May 2006
- Constituency: Zakarpattia Oblast, No. 70 (1998–2002); Cherkasy Oblast, No. 201 (2002–2006)

Personal details
- Born: 29 December 1966 (age 59) Uzhhorod, Ukrainian SSR, Soviet Union (now Ukraine)
- Party: OPZZh (since 2017)
- Other political affiliations: SDPU(o) (1996–2007); Party of Regions (2007–2014); Opposition Bloc (2014–2017)
- Children: 2
- Education: Uzhhorod National University

Nestor Ivanovych Shufrych (Ukrainian: Не́стор Іва́нович Шу́фрич, born 29 December 1966) is a Ukrainian politician who served in the Verkhovna Rada between 1998 and 2025. Since 2017, Shufrych has been in the pro-Russian Eurosceptic political party Opposition Platform — For Life, which was outlawed in 2022 following the launch of the Russian invasion of Ukraine. During the invasion, Shufrych was arrested in September 2023 under suspicion of treason.

== Early life and education ==
Shufrych was born on 29 December 1966 in Uzhorod, Ukrainian SSR, USSR. His paternal ancestors were ethnic Serbs.

Shufrych graduated from the Uzhhorod National University in 1992 with a diploma in history. In 2004, he wrote a thesis "Development and Transformation of agrarian industry in Hungary" earning him an academical honors of a Candidate of Economical Sciences from the Institute of Agrarian Economics (Ukrainian Agrarian Academy of Sciences).

In 1985–1987 Shufrych served in the Soviet military, afterwards he became an interpreter for a trade-revenue company in Uzhhorod. In 1989 Shufrych became an adviser of cooperative union "Retro" and commercial director of the Soviet-Austrian company "Tekop". Since 1991 Shufrych worked as a director for the Ukrainian-American company "West-Contrade", becoming its president in 1995.

== Politics ==
In 1996 and through 2007, Shufrych was a member of the Social Democratic Party of Ukraine (united) (SDPU(o)) which was headed by former President Leonid Kravchuk. In 2005, Shufrych became the First Deputy Leader of the party.

In 1998, Shufrych was elected from the 70th electoral district in Zakarpattia Oblast from SDPU(o), the 22nd on the party list. He gathered 16.8% out of 12 candidates with 70.8% of voting in the district. At the time of elections Shufrych was a director of "West-Contrade".

- 1998 – 2000 Parliamentary committee on economic policy, management of public economics, property, and investments
- 1998 Control commission on privatization
- 1998 Plenipotentiary representative of SDPU(o)
- 1999 National council on youth policy for the President of Ukraine (Leonid Kuchma)
- 2001 – 2002 Parliamentary committee on Budget

In 2002, Shufrych unsuccessfully ran as member of SDPU(o), finishing third out 20 candidates and gathering 9.2% of the vote. He was, however, elected to the Zakarpattia Oblast Council. In three months he successfully ran in the 201st electoral district in Cherkasy Oblast as a self-nominated candidate. Shufrych gathered 29.8% out of 18 other candidates. At the time of elections he was a president of the "Cherkasy meat company" and a member of SDPU(o).

- 2002 Parliamentary group of SDPU(o)
- 2003 Parliamentary committee on Budget

In 2006, Shufrych ran by a party list from the Opposition Bloc "Not So!", being listed the 4th from SDPU(o). The bloc lost its elections earning 1.01% nationwide, with a 3% parliamentary threshold. However, he managed to be elected to the Verkhovna Rada of Crimea from the bloc. As part of the 2006 Ukrainian political crisis, Shufrych was appointed as Head of the State Emergency Service of Ukraine in the Second Yanukovych government.

In 2007, Shufrych ran by a party list from the Party of Regions, being listed the 5th for the 2007 Ukrainian parliamentary election. The party won the elections, earning 34.4% nationwide with 3% parliamentary threshold.

On 23 November 2012, President Yanukovych dismissed Shufrych from the position of deputy secretary of the National Security and Defense Council of Ukraine because he was re-elected into parliament in the 2012 Ukrainian parliamentary election. He was No. 27 on the Party of Regions electoral list.

=== Russo-Ukrainian War ===
Shufrych was present at negotiations on 21 June 2014 to discuss President Petro Poroshenko's peace plan, although it was unclear who he represented there. Shufrych himself claimed the government had appealed to him to contribute to the mediation of Viktor Medvedchuk.

On 30 September 2014, Shufrych was beaten and injured by a mob in Odesa.

In the 2014 Ukrainian parliamentary election, Shufrych was again re-elected into parliament; this time after placing 11th on the electoral list of Opposition Bloc. In November 2017, Shufrych joined Opposition Platform — For Life. Shufrych was re-elected, placed 7th on the party list of Opposition Platform — For Life, in the 2019 Ukrainian parliamentary election.

On 18 February 2022 (a week before the Russian invasion of Ukraine began), during a panel show, Shufrych was physically assaulted and put into a headlock by journalist Yuriy Butusov after he refused to condemn Vladimir Putin's actions in the Donbas and Crimea. This brawl was on live television and was broadcast internationally.

From March to June 2022 during the initial months of the invasion, Shufrych's affiliated political party would be suspended, dissolved, and banned by Ukrainian government bodies, stemming from allegations of the OPZZh having ties to Russia.

On 15 September 2023, Shufrych was arrested by the Security Service of Ukraine under charges for treason, facing 15 years in prison. The SBU alleged that Shufrych was working with Russian intelligence to spread pro-Kremlin narratives in Ukraine, such as disinformation that Ukraine is an artificial entity or that Russians and Ukrainians are a single nation. Several objects of outlawed Soviet and Russian paraphernalia (including military uniforms, medals, swords, and the ribbon of Saint George) were found during a search of Shufrych's residence.

Shufrych's assets were blocked and he was stripped of his Ukrainian state awards on 19 January 2025 by a decree of Ukrainian President Volodymyr Zelenskyy.

== Personal life ==
Shufrych's paternal ancestors were ethnic Serbs.

Shufrych is a former member of the National Olympic Committee of Ukraine. He left the National Olympic Committee in January 2023.

Prior to his 2023 arrest, Shufrych was collecting Soviet and Russian military paraphernalia, as well as several dozen deer skull mounts.
