= Ihor Shurma =

Ukrainian politician

Igor Mykhailovych Shurma
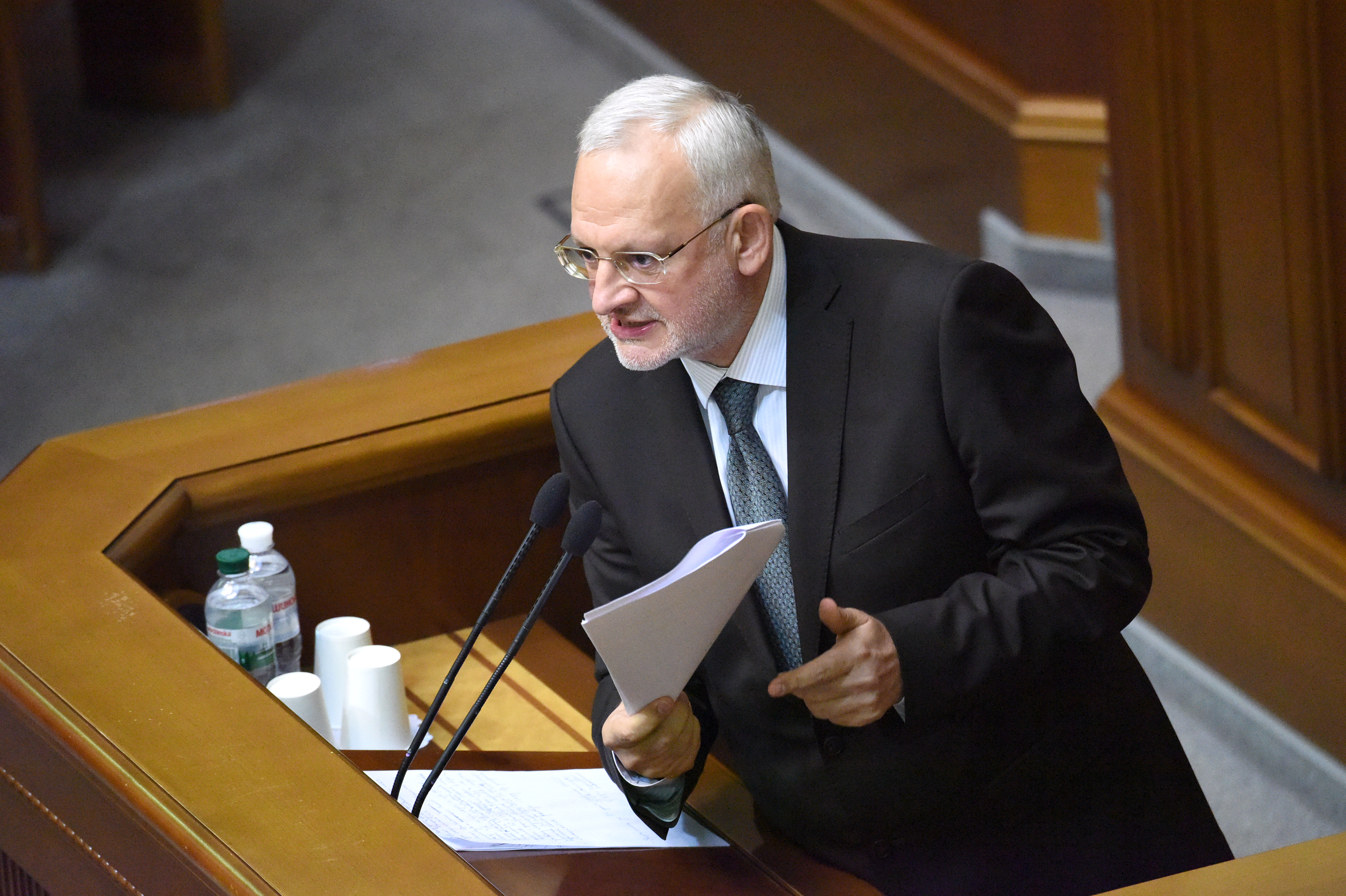

Personal details
- Born: 26 September 1958 (age 68) Lviv, Ukrainian SSR, Soviet Union (now Ukraine)
- Education: Danylo Halytsky Lviv National Medical University

Igor Mykhailovych Shurma (Ukrainian: Ігор Михайлович Шурма; born 26 September 1958) is a Ukrainian politician who served as a People's Deputy of Ukraine in the 5th and 8th Ukrainian Verkhovna Rada.

== Education and the first years of working activity ==
Shurma was born on September 26, 1958, in Lviv into a family of an employee. In 1975–1976 he worked as miller at Lviv plan of electrical measuring instruments. In 1980–1982 he was an aid man at the ambulance station in Lviv City Hospital. In 1982 he graduated from Danylo Halytsky Lviv National Medical University, the first years after graduation he worked as a doctor of food hygiene of the district Sanitary and Epidemiologic Station, then was a senior administrator of Farmachemistry Department at Lviv State Medical Institute. From 1986 to 1995 he took the post of authorized doctor of Lviv Oblast Committee Trade union of healthcare workers, then headed the department of Region enterprise «Medtekhnika». In 1996–1998 he was a director of limited liability company «Decada-Lviv», in 1998–2001 he took the post of the head of the department of planning, records and personnel training of Lviv Oblast Healthcare Administration. Candidate of Medical Sciences February 14, 2104.

== Public, state and political activity ==
In 1999 Igor Shurma entered Social Democratic Party of Ukraine (united). In 2000 he was elected the member of the Social Democratic Party of Ukraine (united) (SDPU(u)) Political Council. In 2001—2003 — he was a secretary of Lviv Regional Committee of SDPU(u). In 2003 he was elected a People's Deputy of Ukraine of the IVth convocation. In 2005—2006 he led a political activity, criticizing Viktor Yushchenko Government. Since April 2006 after the defeat of Oppositional Bloc «Ne Tak!», having been created on the basis of SDPU(u) Party at the Parliamentary Elections in 2006 he quit politics and moved to Kharkiv where he started to work at the City Council. Since September 2006 he has been working as a deputy mayor and a director of Department of Healthcare and Social Issues. Igor Shurma continued his political activity at regional level. On April 13, 2010, he was appointed a vice chairman of Kharkiv Region State Administration on social issues. In 2013 he was fired from the post. In 2014 Igor Shurma was elected a people's deputy of Ukraine on all-Ukraine multi-mandate constituency, political party "Opposition Bloc", number in the list is 27. The date of starting up the disputative full powers: November 27, 2014. The member of the Verkhovna Rada of Ukraine on Healthcare Issues.

In the 2019 Ukrainian parliamentary election Shurma failed to get reelected as a candidate number 32 on the party list of Opposition Bloc.

== Awards ==
Order of Merit (Ukraine), 2nd class
