= Serhiy Larin =

Ukrainian politician

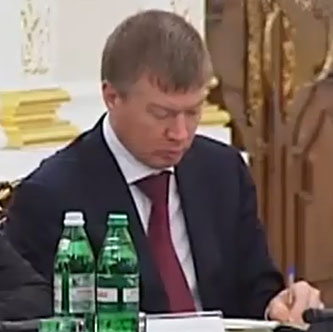
Serhiy Larin

Serhiy Larin (Ukrainian: Сергій Миколайович Ларін) (born 11 January 1962) is a Ukrainian politician and electrical engineer.

== Biography ==
Larin was born on 11 January 1962 in Khartsyzk within the Ukrainian SSR in the Soviet Union. In 1981, he graduated from the Donetsk Polytechnic College with the specialty of electrical technician. After completing his mandatory military service in the Ukrainian SSR, he worked as an electrician for the better part of the decade, and also additionally graduated from Ukrainian Engineering Pedagogics Academy in 1990 with a specialty as an electromechanical engineer.

Larin first entered politics as a Secretary of the Komsomol for the Khartsyzsk Pipe Plant in 1989, before becoming a deputy of the Khartsyzsk City Council until 1992. He then served on the Khartsyzsk City Executive Committee until 1996, where he was head of the faction of the Party of Democratic Revival of Ukraine. He entered the party's political system in 1996, and worked in various positions within the party until 2001. During this time, he became a consultant to the Secretariat of the Donetsk Regional Council and then Deputy Head of the Department for Family, Youth and Tourism of the Donetsk Regional State Administration leading up to the 1998 elections.

Larin has been (except between April 2010 and November 2014) a member of the Ukrainian parliament since the 1998 Ukrainian parliamentary election for the People's Democratic Party, For United Ukraine! (2002 election), Party of Regions (2006 and 2007 election) and in the 2014 Ukrainian parliamentary election for the Opposition Bloc and in the 2019 Ukrainian parliamentary election for Opposition Platform — For Life. In April 2010 President Viktor Yanukovych appointed Larin Governor of Kirovohrad Oblast. Larin was appointed Deputy Head of Yanukovych's Presidential Administration of Ukraine on 9 January 2013 (the administration was led by Serhiy Lyovochkin). On 26 February 2014 a decree of acting President Oleksandr Turchynov dismissed Larin as Deputy Head of the Presidential Administration.

In April 2014, he was expelled from the Party of Regions for supporting the presidential candidate Serhiy Tihipko, as the official party position was to support Mykhailo Dobkin. On 18 January 2018 he was one of 36 deputies, alongside nearly all of the Opposition Platform — For Life deputies, to vote against a law on the recognition of Ukrainian sovereignty over the temporarily occupied areas of Donetsk and Luhansk. On 21 April 2022 Larin joined the Platform for Life and Peace parliamentary group consisting of mostly former Opposition Platform — For Life deputies.

Government offices
| Preceded by Volodymyr Movchan | Governor of Kirovohrad Oblast; 2010–2013 | Succeeded by Andriy Nikolayenko |
