= Kuchma (disambiguation) =

Leonid Kuchma (born 1938) is a Ukrainian politician who was the second president of Ukraine.

Kuchma may also refer to:

- Kuchma (hat), traditional tall sheepskin hat of several Centra/East European peoples
- KUCHMA Electoral Bloc of Political Parties, former political alliance in Ukraine

== Surname ==
- Aleksandr Kuchma (born 1980), Kazakh football coach and former professional player
- Liudmyla Kuchma (born 1940), wife of Leonid Kuchma

== See also ==
- Kuczma, a surname
