= Kuczma =

Kuczma is a Polish-language surname. Archaic feminine forms: Kuchmina (after husband), Kuchmianka (after father); currently may be used colloquially. The word literally means a kind of fur hat, Kuchma. Notable people with the name include:

- Marek Kuczma (1935–1991), Polish mathematician
- Marcin E. Kuczma, Polish mathematician, recipient of the David Hilbert Award

== See also ==
- Kuchma (disambiguation)
