= Social-Conservative Party of Ukraine "Gerts" =

Political party in Ukraine

"Social-Conservative Party of Ukraine "Gerts" (Ukrainian: Соціально-консервативна партія України «Ґерць»), founded as All-Ukrainian Political Union Women for the Future (Ukrainian: Всеукраїнське політичне об’єднання «Жінки за майбутнє») is a political party in Ukraine registered on 30 March 2001. The party was created by Lyudmila Kuchma, a wife of the then serving President of Ukraine Leonid Kuchma. Among notable party candidates was Dmytro Firtash.

At the legislative elections of 30 March 2002, the party won 2.1% of the popular vote and no seats; although final poll results had predicted 5% till 6% of the total votes for the party. At the legislative elections of 26 March 2006, the party was part of the Opposition Bloc "Ne Tak". The party did not participate in the 2007 elections.

In a 2019 Ukrainian parliamentary election by-election on 15 March 2020 in electoral district 179 located in Kharkiv Oblast the party's candidate Olha Kovalenko received less than 160 votes (winner Yuliya Svitlychna received about 30.000 votes).

In November 2024 the party changed its name to Social-Conservative Party of Ukraine "Gerts".

== See also ==
- Dmytro Firtash
