= Oleksii Kunchenko =

Ukrainian politician and businessman (born 1952)

- Олексій Кунченко
- A picture of him from 2014.

People's Deputy of Ukraine
- In office 25 May 2006 – 23 November 2007
- Constituency: SPU, No. 13
- In office 30 March 2010 – 12 December 2012
- Constituency: Party of Regions, No. 203 (by-list)
- In office 12 December 2012 – 27 November 2014
- Constituency: Luhansk Oblast, No. 106

Personal details
- Born: Oleksii Petrovych Kunchenko; 23 December 1952 (age 73) Sievierodonetsk, Ukrainian SSR, Soviet Union
- Party: Socialist Party of Ukraine (2006-2007); Party of Regions (2007-2014)
- Education: East Ukrainian National University

Oleksii Petrovych Kunchenko (Ukrainian: Олексій Петрович Кунченко; born 23 December 1952) is a Ukrainian politician who served as a People's Deputy of Ukraine in the Verkhovna Rada from 2006 to 2007 and again from 2010 to 2014. Initially, Kunchenko was a member of the Socialist Party of Ukraine (SPU), but he defected to the Party of Regions in 2007, where he would remain until the end of his mandate in 2014.

== Early life ==
Kunchenko was born on 23 December 1952 in the city of Sievierodonetsk, then part of the Ukrainian SSR in the Soviet Union. After graduating from the Rubizhne branch of the East Ukrainian National University with a specialisation as an engineer-mechanic, he started working at Azot, a chemical manufacturer in his native Sievierodonetsk. He would spend the rest of his career there, going from a repairman to mechanic before transitioning into the post of Chairman of the Trade Union Committee of Azot. After this, he became Secretary of the Voroshilovgrad Oblast Committee of the Trade Union of Chemical Workers and then Head of the Centralised Repair Shop of Azot. Sometime later, he was returned to being Chairman of the Trade Union Committee of Azot and then he became Director of the Consumer Market and later also Commercial Affairs.

== Business career ==
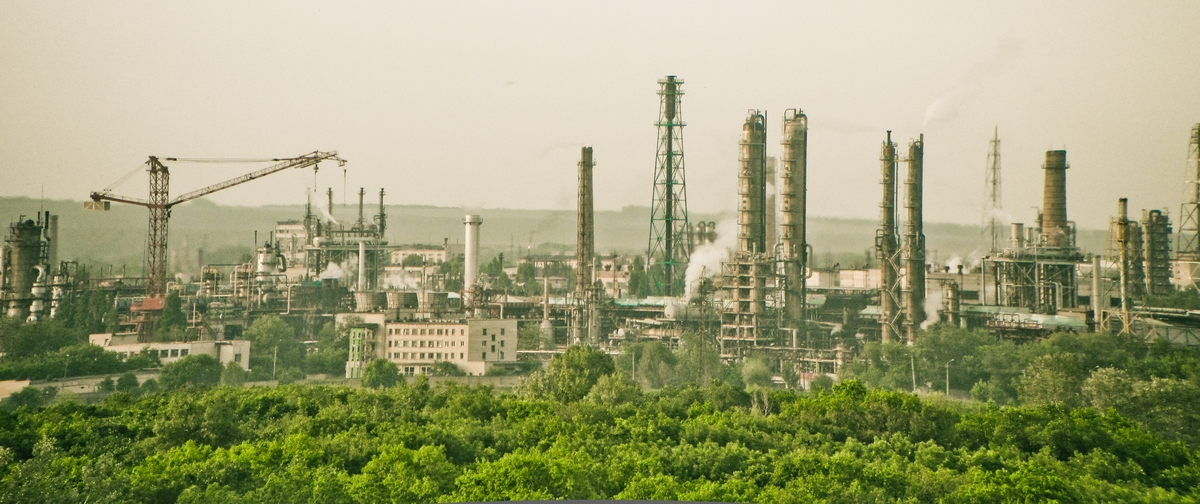
Azot in Sievierodonetsk, which he was the director of after working there for many years.

Starting in 2000, Kunchenko became general director of Azot. Upon becoming general director, Azot was allowed to obtain a preferential price from the state-owned Ukrnafta in 2009 for the supply of gas to the facilities. At the same time, the denationalisation of the enterprise began, which led to numerous lawsuits, with one going to the Supreme Court of Ukraine over the creation of the CJSC "Azot". The Pecherskyi District Court of Kyiv had earlier invalidated the creation of the enterprise, in accordance with the claims of Luhanskoblenergo. After its denationalisation, Azot was acquired by the American businessman Alexander Rovt under IBE Trade in return for an investment of $120 million. At least sometime before 2011, Kunchenko officially left Azot.

== Political career ==
In 2006, Kunchenko first entered politics, running with the party list of the Socialist Party of Ukraine for a seat in the Verkhovna Rada during the 2006 Ukrainian parliamentary elections. He was put at No. 13 on the list and was thus successfully elected. Upon joining the Rada, he became a member of the SPU faction and also joined the Committee on Fuel and Energy Complex. At the same time, he was appointed the First Secretary of the Luhansk Regional Committee of the SPU. However, the 2006 convocation ultimately ended early, leading to the declaration of the snap 2007 Ukrainian parliamentary elections. For the 2007 elections, he defected to the Party of Regions, and was included on their party list at No. 203. As he was low on the list, he was not initially elected. However, in 2010, 22 party representatives resigned early due to executive appointments, because dual mandates are forbidden, and he thus entered parliament after moving up the list when they did so.

Upon re-entering the parliament again, he became deputy chair and later First Deputy Chair of the Committee on Fuel and Energy Complex. He was elected deputy chair after Oleksandr Yefremov, the chairman of the faction of the Party of Regions in the Rada, promised him the position. He also became a member of the Party of Regions faction. Even before the end of the convocation in 2012, it was widely expected that Kunchenko would run for re-election. According to the Luhansk CVU, it was expected that Kunchenko would be backed by the city and oblast authorities alongside Yefremov, while he would probably run against Yulii Ioffe, who was to be backed by Yuriy Boyko and his close connection Dmytro Firtash. This ended up being true, as during the election campaign season in summer of 2011, Ioffe announced his candidacy against the incumbent Kunchenko. However, unexpectedly, before the election season started to ramp up, it was announced that the constituency both were running in, No. 106, would be split. Thus, a new constituency, No. 112, was created, which Ioffe ran in, and consisted of the cities of Brianka, Kirovsk, and Rubizhne. Meanwhile, the original constituency, No. 106, still comprised mostly of only the city of Sievierodonetsk. After this, the race was far less competitive, with two new candidates registering: Igor Berkut and Pavel Korchagin, the latter was associated with the Communist Party of Ukraine.

In the end, Kunchenko won his re-election to the 7th convocation in the 106th constituency with 41.41% of the vote (33,676 people). The second place went to the self-nominated candidate Yurii Furman, who won 17.32% of the vote. Upon rejoining the Rada, he became deputy chairman of both the Committee on Fuel and Energy Complex again and also for the faction of the Party of Regions. Initially, in October 2013, he helped propose one amendment to the European integration bills, although he voted absent during the consideration of most. However, he eventually voted against the condemnation of the death of protestors in relation to Euromaidan, and was also absent again for Resolutions No. 5115 and 5116, which would resubordinate some settlements that were not under Ukrainian control due to the War in the Donbas (although, in the case of the latter, his constituency was not that heavily effected after the Battles of Sievierodonetsk). After the end of his mandate, his current whereabouts are unknown.

== Honours and awards ==
Kunchenko has been awarded the following honours:

- Honorary citizen of Sievierodonetsk (awarded in 2004, revoked in 2025 by the city council)
- Order of Merit, III degree (2002)
- Order of Merit, II degree (2008)
- Order of Merit, I degree (2011)
