= Tatyana Bakhteeva =

Ukrainian politician (born 1953)

Tetiana Bakhteyeva
- Тетяна Бахтеєва
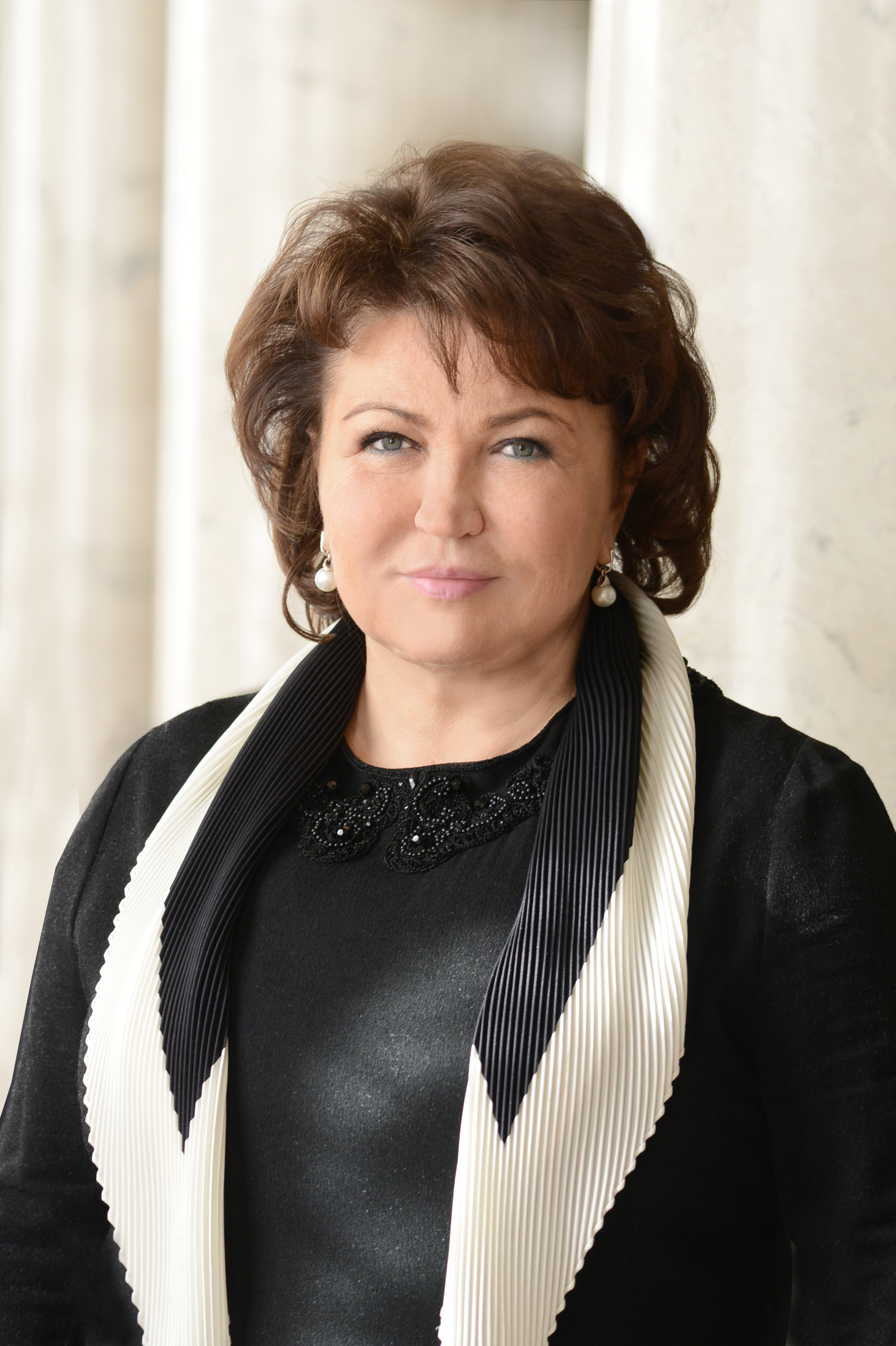
- Bakhteyeva in 2015

People's Deputy of Ukraine

4th convocation
- In office 2002–2006

5th convocation
- In office 25 May 2006 – 23 November 2007
- Constituency: No. 33

6th convocation
- In office 23 November 2007 – 12 December 2012
- Constituency: No. 23

7th convocation
- In office 12 December 2012 – 27 November 2014
- Constituency: Donetsk Oblast No. 42

8th convocation
- In office 27 November 2014 – 24 July 2019

Personal details
- Born: 27 November 1953 (age 72) Donetsk, Ukrainian SSR, Soviet Union
- Party: Party of Regions (2002–2014); Opposition Bloc (since 2014)
- Spouse: Alimzhan Bakhteev (divorced)
- Children: 1
- Education: Donetsk Medical University, M.D. (1977); Donetsk State University of Economics and Trade, DipEcon (2002)
- Occupation: Politician

Tetyana Dmytrivna Bakhteyeva (Ukrainian: Тетяна Дмитрівна; (Note: Also Tatyana Dmitrievna Bakhteyeva, from Russian: Татьяна Дмитриевна Бахтеева) born 27 November 1953) is a Doctor of Medical Sciences (since 2008), CEO of Donetsk Oblast Clinical Territorial Medical Association, former People's Deputy of Ukraine from 2019 to 2022.

== Early life and education ==
Tatyana Bakhteeva was born on 27 November 1953, in Donetsk, Ukrainian SSR. She is divorced, her ex-husband Alimzhan Bakhteev is working in bus transfer services. They have a daughter Irina Valitova (born 1975), who is a teacher at Donetsk Medical University in Donetsk, Ukraine.

In 1977, Bakhteeva graduated from Donetsk Medical University as a GP. In 2002, she also obtained a degree in Economics from the School of Economics named after Mikhail Tugan-Baranovsky. In 2002, she received her Ph.D. in medical sciences with the thesis "Neurotic disorders in women". Once she became a People's Deputy of Ukraine, she never returned to medicine.

== Early career ==
While completing her education, Bakhteeva was also employed. From 1977 until 1980, she worked as a therapist and physical therapist at the hospital No.2 at Yasinovataya station, Donetsk railway. From 1980 until 1991, Bakhteeva worked as a doctor. From 1986 until 1991, she was the Deputy Head of medical-labour expert commission at Donetsk city hospital No.3.

In 1991, Bakhteeva became the Head of Donetsk Regional radiological medical expert commission for Chernobyl liquidators. One year later in 1992, her responsibilities included working with children recovering from the Chernobyl Disaster in Cuba.

From 1994 through 1997, Bakhteva continued her work with the Chernobyl Disaster, as the Head Doctor at Donetsk Oblast, which is a health care center for individuals affected by the consequences of Chernobyl accident. In 1997, Bakhteeva became the CEO of Donetsk Oblast Clinical Territorial Medical Association.

Bakhteeva is the founder of the Donetsk Oblast charity foundation Humaneness.

== Political career ==
In 1998, and until 2002, she was elected to be the Deputy of Donetsk Oblast Council and was a member of health committee for a term of five years.

From 2002 to 2019, Bakhteeva was a member of parliament. In May 2002, Bakhteyeva was elected the People's Deputy of Ukraine from Party of Regions in the 2002 Ukrainian parliamentary election on the election list of For United Ukraine!, a political party in Ukraine. She was then seated as a member of Party of Regions in the 4th, 5th, 6th, and 7th Verkhovna Radas in the National Party of Ukraine. In the 5th and 6th Verkhovna Radas, she took the post of Head of Health Care committee.

She was then seated in the 8th Verkhovna Rada for the political party known as Opposition Bloc. In the 2014 Ukrainian parliamentary election, she was again re-elected into parliament; this time after placing 9th on the electoral list of Opposition Bloc. Bakhteyeva was also a:

- Member of the Group of Interparliamentary Relations with Russia;
- Member of the Interparliamentary relations with Switzerland;
- Member of the Interparliamentary relations with Liechtenstein;
- Member of the Group of Interparliamentary Relations with Lebanon;
- Member of the Group of Interparliamentary Relations with Kazakhstan; and,
- Member of the Group of Interparliamentary Relations with Greece.

After 2013, Bakhteyeva was appointed to be the "People's Deputy of Ukraine," in the 8th convocation of Opposition Bloc. She was the Chairman of the Committee on Health Protection.

While serving in the above political positions, Bakhteeva regularly visited Donetsk and Donetsk People's Republic (DPR) for the last time in 2019. She helped promote the policy of reconciliation to Serhii Syvokho, an associate of President Volodymyr Zelenskyy.

In the 2019 Ukrainian parliamentary election she lost the election and was not re-elected into parliament; this time after placing 26th on the electoral list of a reformatted (and thus new) party known as the Opposition Bloc.

At the end of January 2020, a Ukrainian public organization Fellowship named Native Donbas was presented in Kyiv. Among the founders were Bakhteeva, as well as the ex-deputy head of the Donetsk Regional State Administration Boris Adamov, who is a multiple champion of the Paralympic Games in swimming. Co-founders also included honorary citizen of Donetsk and Sloviansk, Viktor Smirnov, and three former deputies including Bakhteeva herself, Valeriy Konovalyuk and the president of the Nord Holding Valentin Landik.

Until 24 February 2022, Bakhteyeva publicly stood for the "special status" of Donbas and against the economic blockade of territories temporarily not controlled by Ukraine.

Bakhteeva managed to get the biggest profits with the help of official powers from tenders together with the Fistal brothers. These are representatives of the Donetsk medical clan close to the Russian special services, whose patriarch is the surgeon of the Donetsk Burn Center, Emil Fistal. Fistals openly support the Russian occupation, registered their companies in the Russian economic space in Donetsk. At the same time, with the support of Bakhteeva, they continued to receive excess profits as "medical tender kings" of Ukraine. In just two years till the end of 2021, $440 mln passed through firms associated with Bakhteeva and the separatists Fistal family, of which up to 30% returned to the beneficiaries of the scheme as kickbacks.

In late 2021, she attended Yukhym Zvyahilsky's funeral.

== Award and honors ==
In 2010, Bakhteeva was ranked No.7 on the 100 most influential Ukrainian women list published by Ukrainian magazine Focus.

- Order of Princess Olga, III class (2002)
- "Miner's Glory" badge, I, II, III class
- Order of Saint Barbara, given by Ukrainian Orthodox Church
- Certificate of Merit "For Humanism" from the President of Ukraine
- Certificate of Merit from Cabinet of Ministers of Ukraine (2003)

== See also ==
- 2007 Ukrainian parliamentary election
- List of Ukrainian Parliament Members 2007
- Verkhovna Rada
