= People's Movement of Ukraine for Unity =

Ukrainian political party created in 2000

People's Movement of Ukraine for Unity (NRU for Unity) is a political party of Ukraine and an offshoot of the People's Movement of Ukraine that was created on November 25, 2000. The party is led by Bohdan Boyko.

The party participated in the 2002 Ukrainian parliamentary election as part of the electoral bloc People's Movement of Ukraine consisting of the People's Movement of Ukraine for Unity and the All-Ukrainian Union "Center". The bloc and its parties failed to obtain any seats in parliament.

In the 2004 presidential election the party supported its own candidate Bohdan Boyko who in the first round placed 17th among 24 other candidates.

After the Orange Revolution, NRU for Unity announced itself as a Ukrainian patriotic alternative to the new liberal-cosmopolitan government and pro-Moscow opposition.

During the 2006 Ukrainian parliamentary election the party ran independently and unsuccessfully. It received the biggest support in Crimea - 0.57%.
