= Yuriy Boyko =

Ukrainian politician (born 1958)

Hero of Ukraine Yuriy Boyko OS
- Юрій Бойко (Ukrainian); Юрий Бойко (Russian)
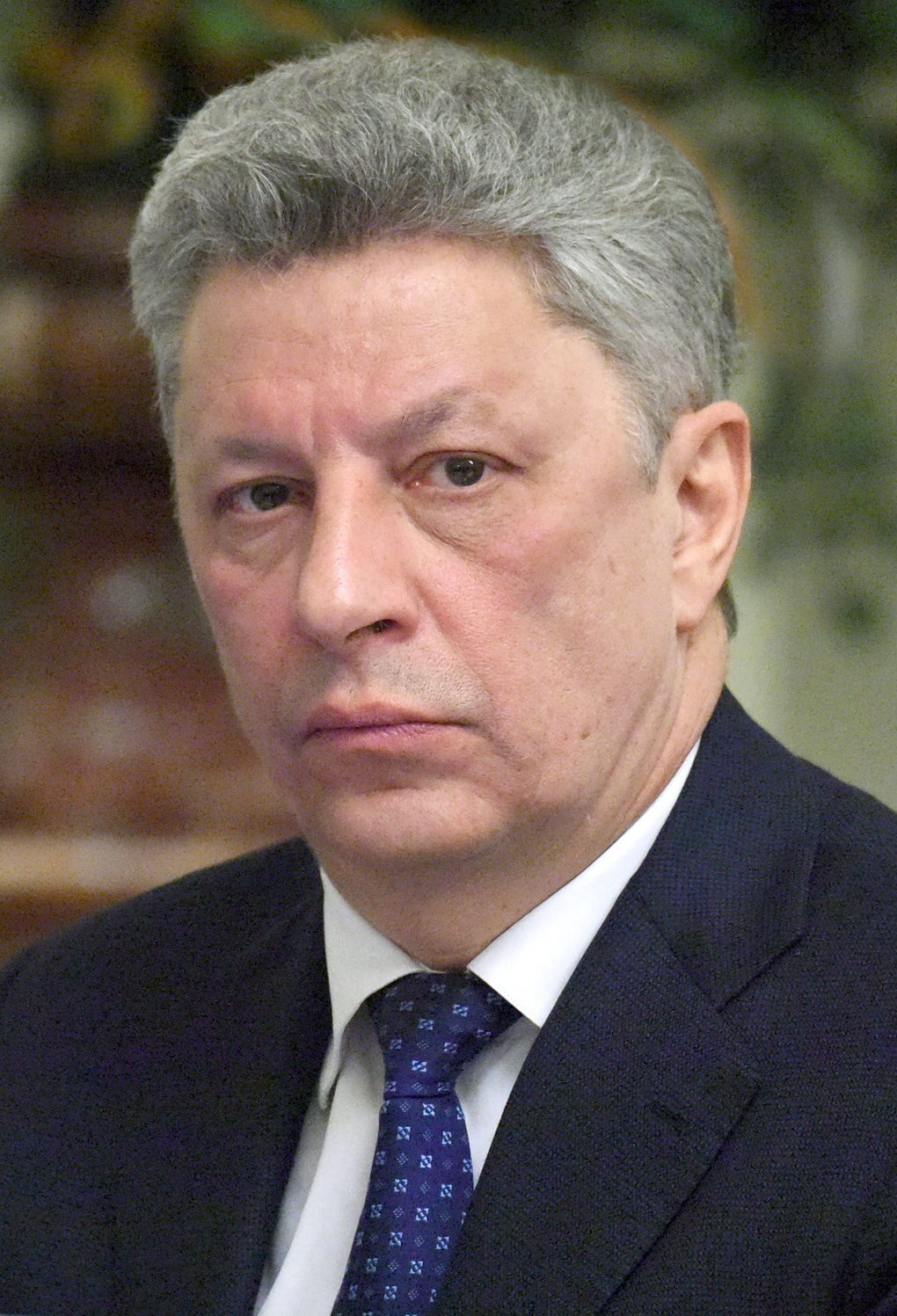
- Boyko in 2018

Vice Prime Minister of Ukraine (Note: on ecology and energy complexes)
- In office 24 December 2012 – 27 February 2014
- Prime Minister: Mykola Azarov
- Preceded by: Borys Kolesnikov
- Succeeded by: Volodymyr Kistion (Note: Vacant from 2014 to 2016)

Minister of Energy
- Acting; 20 November 2020 – 21 December 2020
- Prime Minister: Denys Shmyhal
- Preceded by: Olha Buslavets (acting)
- Succeeded by: Yuriy Vitrenko (acting)
- In office 11 March 2010 – 12 December 2012
- Prime Minister: Mykola Azarov
- Preceded by: Yuriy Prodan
- Succeeded by: Eduard Stavytsky
- In office 4 August 2006 – 18 December 2007
- Prime Minister: Viktor Yanukovych
- Preceded by: Ivan Plachkov
- Succeeded by: Eduard Stavytsky

People's Deputy of Ukraine
- Incumbent
- Assumed office 23 November 2007

Deputy Minister of Energy
- In office July 2003 – March 2005
- Prime Minister: Viktor Yanukovych

Personal details
- Born: Yuriy Anatoliyovych Boyko; 9 October 1958 (age 68) Horlivka, Ukrainian SSR, Soviet Union
- Party: Platform for Life and Peace (since 2022)
- Other political affiliations: Opposition Platform — For Life (2018–2022); Opposition Bloc (2010–2018); Party of Regions (2006–2010); Republican Party of Ukraine (2005–2006)
- Spouse: Vera
- Children: 6
- Education: East Ukraine University; Russian University of Mendeleev
- Occupation: Politician

Yuriy Anatoliyovych Boyko (Ukrainian: Юрій Анатолійович Бойко, Russian: Юрий Анатольевич Бойко; born 9 October 1958) is a Ukrainian politician who served as Vice Prime Minister of Ukraine between 2012 and 2014, as well as the Minister of Energy from 2006 to 2007 and again from 2010 to 2012. Boyko has continuously served as a Member of the Verkhovna Rada since 2007.

Boyko ran for President in the March 2019 election, winning some districts in the southeast of the country but missing qualification for the second round by 4.28% of the votes. Designated a Hero of Ukraine from 2004 to 2025, Boyko was considered to be one of the primary proponents of closer relations with Russia in Ukrainian politics. Boyko was a leading figure of the now-banned Opposition Platform — For Life, which he led to second place in the July 2019 parliamentary election, and currently heads its successor, the Platform for Life and Peace. Following the 2022 Russian invasion of Ukraine, which he opposed, he reversed some of his pro-Russian stances, now supporting Ukraine's proposed accession to the European Union.

== Early life and education ==
Yuriy Boyko was born on 9 October 1958, in Horlivka, Donetsk Oblast. In 1981 Boyko graduated from the D. Mendeleev University of Chemical Technology of Russia (chemical engineering), and in 2001 he graduated from Volodymyr Dahl East Ukrainian National University (engineering and economics).

== Early career ==
From 1981 to 1999, Boyko started as a master at an industrial site and rose to the title of Director General of the chemical plant Zarya in Rubizhne. Following that, from 1999 to 2001, he was Director General of JSC Lisichansknefteorgsintez (Lysychansk refinery), and from August 2001 to February 2002 Boyko served as chairman of the management board of JSC Ukrtatnafta (Kremenchuk refinery).

In February 2002 Boyko was appointed the chairman of NAC Naftogaz-Ukraine, and led the company until March 2005.

== Political career ==
=== Yanukovych cabinet ===
Boyko served as First Deputy Minister of Fuel and Energy of Ukraine from July 2003 to March 2005 in the cabinet of then-Prime Minister Victor Yanukovych. In late July 2004, he was also appointed in the coordination committee for RosUkrEnergo.

In the summer of 2005 President Viktor Yushchenko blocked the arrest of Boyko on suspicion of abuse of office while heading Naftogaz. This arrest had been ordered by Security Service of Ukraine Chairman Oleksandr Turchynov.

During Ukrainian parliamentary elections in 2006, held the year after Boyko was elected the chairman of the Republican Party of Ukraine (RPU), the RPU joined the electoral alliance "Ne Tak!", yet they did not succeed to reach the 3% election threshold required by law to enter parliament.

On 4 August 2006, he was appointed by Yanukovych as Minister of Fuel and Energy. Holding office for over a year, on 18 December 2007, he was dismissed due to the upcoming parliamentary elections, which he successfully contested as member of the Party of Regions.

=== Azarov cabinet ===
On 11 March 2010 Boyko was again appointed the Minister of Fuel and Energy of Ukraine by Prime Minister Mykola Azarov. On 9 December 2010, due to the optimisation of the system of central executive power in Ukraine (a.k.a. reorganisation of ministries), Yanukovych, who was now President of Ukraine, dismissed Boyko on a technicality and re-appointed him as Minister of Energy and Coal Industry.

On 24 December 2012, Boyko was promoted to the position of a Vice Prime Minister, responsible for ecology, natural resources, energy, coal industry and industrial policy. On 23 May 2013, the space sector was added to his functions.

=== Career after vice premiership ===
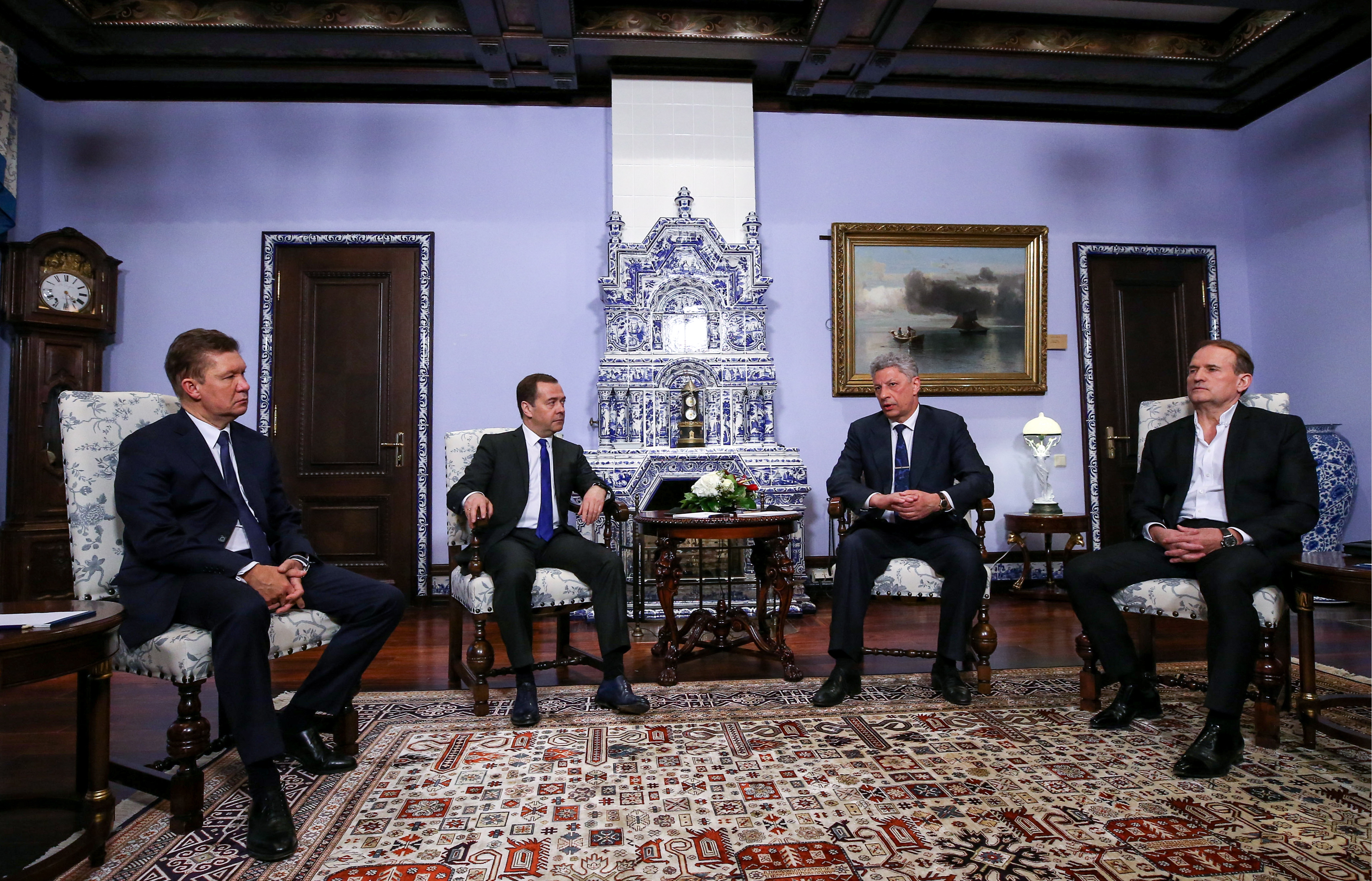
Meeting between Prime Minister of Russia Dmitry Medvedev and Gazprom chairman Alexey Miller, leading the Russian delegation, with Yuriy Boyko and Viktor Medvedchuk on the Ukrainian side

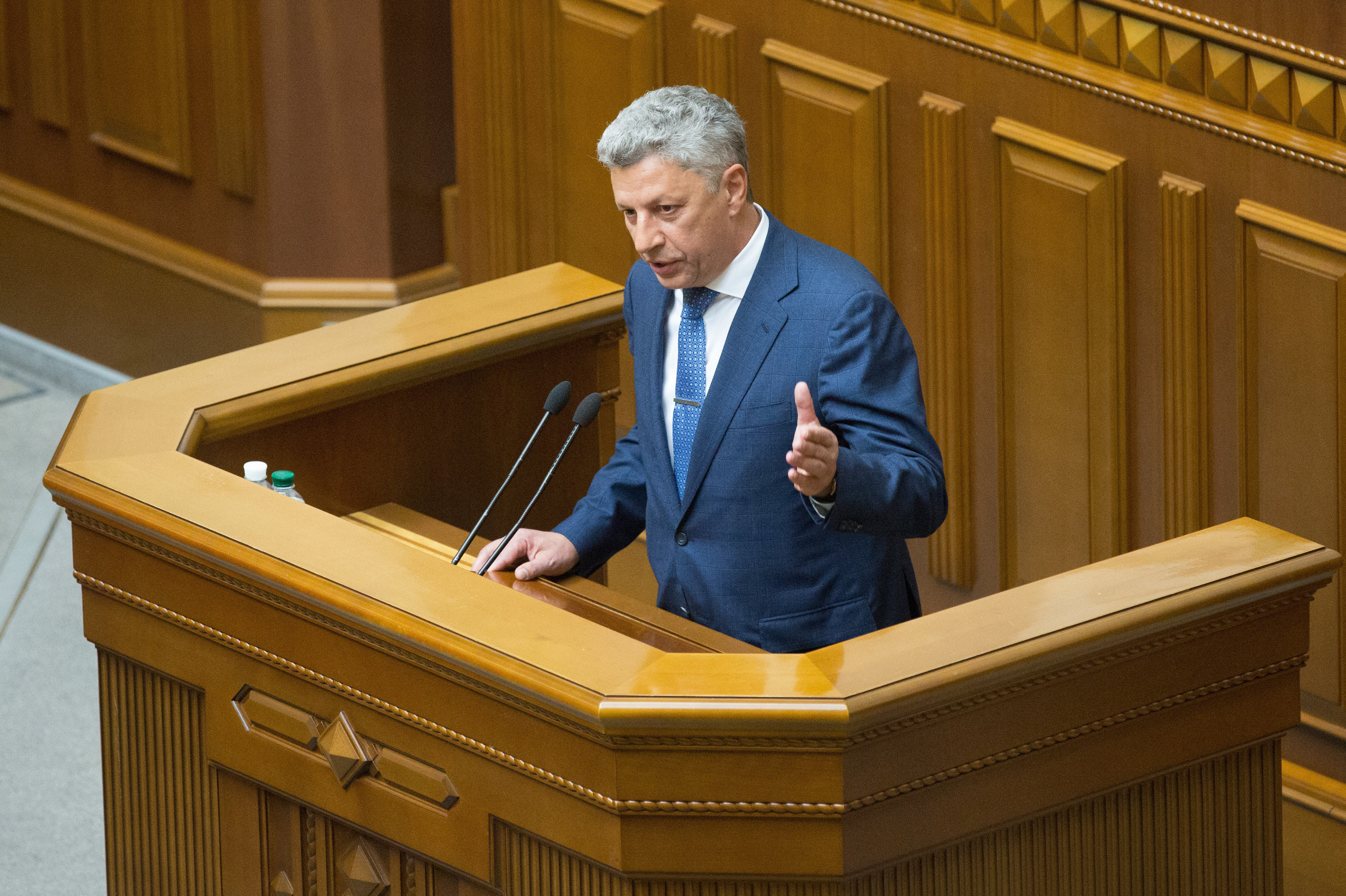
Boyko giving a speech in the Verkhovna Rada (2018)

On 29 March 2014, a Party of Regions convention decided to support Boyko's political opponent Mykhailo Dobkin as a candidate for the presidential election, and on 7 April 2014, the party's political council expelled Boyko amidst infighting. Boyko launched a last-minute presidential campaign himself to oppose Dobkin, receiving less than a percentage point of the electorate.

In the 2014 Ukrainian parliamentary election he was again re-elected into parliament; this time heading the electoral list of Opposition Bloc.

On 9 November 2018, Boyko and the party For life signed an agreement for cooperation in the 2019 Ukrainian presidential election and the parliamentary election of the same year called Opposition Platform-For life. The same day Opposition Bloc leading members Vadym Novynskyi and Borys Kolesnikov claimed the agreement was a "personal initiative" of Boyko and that the Opposition Bloc had not taken any decisions on cooperation with For life. On 17 November 2018 the Opposition Platform-For life nominated Boyko as its candidate in the 2019 Ukrainian presidential election. Boyko was excluded from the Opposition Bloc faction, whose co-chair Oleksandr Vilkul accused him of having "betrayed their voters' interests" on 20 November 2018. Because the Opposition Platform-For life was not yet registered as a party in January 2019 it could not nominate him as a presidential candidate. Hence on 17 January 2019 Boyko submitted documents to the Central Election Commission of Ukraine for registration as a self-nominated candidate. In the election Boyko took the fourth place with 11.67% of the total vote, just over 4% behind incumbent Petro Poroshenko, who polled second and progressed to the second round along with Volodymyr Zelenskyy. In the parliamentary election a few months later, Boyko led his Opposition Platform — For Life party to second place with 13.05% of the vote, becoming the main opposition party.

His party was banned by the government following the 2022 Russian invasion of Ukraine for its pro-Russian stances, despite it having opposed the invasion itself.

Boyko reversed a number of his pro-Russian stances following the ban on his party, and later formed a new parliamentary group made up of former Opposition Platform — For Life members called Platform for Life and Peace.

In December 2024, Boyko posted a video on social media saying that “radicals” were “tearing down monuments, renaming cities, forbidding people to speak their native language and attend the church of their choice”, which was similar to stances expressed by Russia. He subsequently backtracked and clarified that he considered Russian president Vladimir Putin to be a war criminal.

Boyko's assets in Ukraine were blocked and he was stripped of his Ukrainian state awards on 19 January 2025 by a decree of Ukrainian President Volodymyr Zelenskyy.

== Popularity ==
Data shortly before the parliamentary elections in June 2019 suggested that Boyko was the second-ranked pick to be Prime Minister of Ukraine behind eventual appointee Oleksiy Honcharuk.

== Controversies ==
=== Lobbying in the United States ===
Through an offshore scheme in 2005, Boyko funded a K-street lobbyist through which he would meet with top members of the United States Republican Party and other conservatives in the United States.

==== Offshore platform controversy ====
According to newspaper Dzerkalo Tyzhnia ("The Weekly Mirror"), in 2011 Boyko was cited confirming the purchase of a modern offshore drilling platform from Singapore. Dzerkalo Tyzhnia conducted an investigation into the tender surrounding the offshore platform, in which Highway Investment Processing LLC, a supposed offshore shell from Wales, UK, was the winner. The article stated that the Ukrainian state company Chornomornaftogaz, engaged in offshore oil and gas production in Azov and the Black Sea, paid over $400M for a drilling rig that costs $248M. Using Google Street View, journalists cited that Highway Investment Processing LLC appeared to be situated in an equipment store on the outskirts of Cardiff, Wales, and the LLC was further cited in the media as going through liquidation; however, the authorities suspended the liquidation process due to an investigation. Official records with the United Kingdom's Companies House indicated the company was incorporated on 12 December 2008 and was currently listed as active. Throughout the whole affair, Boyko denied fraud allegations surrounding the purchase, citing additional equipment and movement costs and a "report from Halliburton" confirming the price of $400M. After Boyko labeled the Dzerkalo Tyzhnia journalists as "liars," the newspaper in turn filed a lawsuit against Boyko; the case is currently in appeals. The affair also sparked a scandal in Norway where Seadrill was accused of insufficient due diligence and KYC on its shell customer Highway Investment Processing LLC.

=== 2016 assault ===
During a televised debate on 14 November 2016, Boyko punched politician Oleh Lyashko in the face after being called a "Kremlin agent."

=== Link to Dmytro Firtash ===
It is alleged that Boyko is "close associates" with the controversial businessman Dmytro Firtash.

== Awards ==
- 22 August 2004 - title Hero of Ukraine and the Order of the State, for outstanding personal service to the development of Ukrainian fuel and energy complex, and long-term commitment
- 22 May 2003 - Order of Merit, III class, for good results in work and significant personal contribution to the development of oil and gas industry in Ukraine
- Order of Saint Seraphim of Sarov of the II class

Boyko was stripped of his Ukrainian state awards on 19 January 2025 by a decree of Ukrainian President Volodymyr Zelenskyy.

== Personal life ==
He is married, together with his wife Vera he is raising 6 children. Boyko plays ice hockey and football and likes waterskiing and windsurfing.
