= Derzhava (Ukrainian party) =

Political party in Ukraine

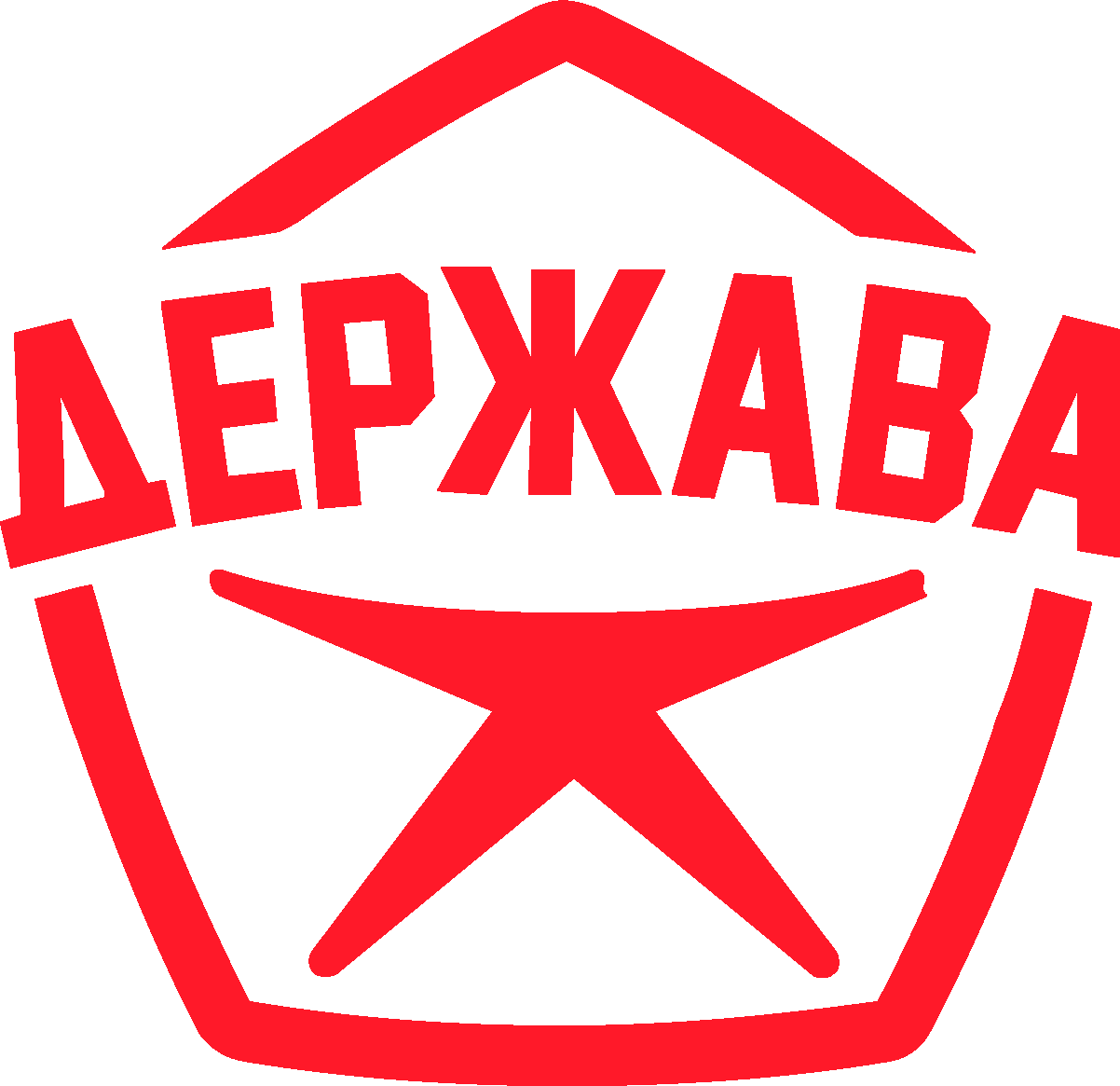
- Leader: Dmytro Vasylets
- Founded: 11 January 1999
- Banned: 14 June 2022
- Headquarters: Kyiv, Ukraine
- Ideology: Socialism; Left-wing nationalism Social conservatism Russophilia
- Political position: Left-wing

Website
- d-ua.org

Derzhava (Ukrainian: Держава, lit. 'nation' or 'power') is a Ukrainian political party registered in late 1999 that formed a coalition with the Progressive Socialist Party of Ukraine after the Orange Revolution. Its former name was "Rus United" (Ukrainian: Русь Єдина).

== History ==
The party did not take part in the 2002 Ukrainian parliamentary election. In 2004, the party joined became part of an electoral coalition in support of Viktor Yanukovych and protested against the Orange Revolution.

It participated in the 2006 elections to the Verkhovna Rada as part of the electoral bloc "State – Labor Union". The bloc ran under slogas such as 'faith, conscience, people, unity!' and 'spirituality, work and justice!'. The State – Labor Union spoke for the preservation of economic ties to Russia, retaining the non-aligned status of Ukraine, recognition of Russian as the second state language of Ukraine, and the return of church property to the Orthodox Church. The bloc obtained 0.14% of the votes in the election. In 2006, it was led by Hennadiy Vasilyev. It did not participate in the 2007 Ukrainian parliamentary election.

Derzhava was one of several political parties suspended by the National Security and Defense Council of Ukraine during the Russian invasion of Ukraine, along with Left Opposition, Nashi, Opposition Bloc, Opposition Platform — For Life, Party of Shariy, Progressive Socialist Party of Ukraine, Socialist Party of Ukraine, Union of Leftists, and the Volodymyr Saldo Bloc.

On 14 June 2022, the Eighth Administrative Court of Appeal banned the party.

== Ideology ==
In its program, the party states that its goal is to build a socialist society that provides conditions for the "dynamic and harmonious development" of Ukrainian citizens. It condemns 'parasitism' in the economy and calls for a new state model of labour relations that will "exclude the possibility of parasitism" on workers' labor. The party also has a nationalist tint - according to its declaration, foreigners and dual-citizenship holders are to be forbidden from managing state property. Apart from that, Derzhava also wants to draft a bill that would prohibit privatizing public agricultural land in Ukraine.

Socially, Derzhava plans to recognise the Russian language as the second national language of Ukraine; it also calls for the repeal of decommunization laws, and a ban on "honoring collaborators and persons who collaborated with the Nazis". The party also calls for "development of traditional family values", and foresees constitutional protection of cultural identities and "indigenous peoples".

In regards to NATO and the EU, the party believes that membership in these organizations should be banned via Ukrainian constitution, and argues that joining these organizations would be a breach of Ukrainian sovereignty. The party condemns any cooperation or involvement with the International Monetary Fund, and believes that Ukraine must cut all contact with the organization as to protect itself from pressure for neoliberal and austerity reforms.

According to the party, all natural monopolies, especially those concerning resources and 'strategic enterprises', should be fully state-owned. More radically, Derzhava proposes to make all agricultural be exclusively owned by the state, with a possibility of a long-term lease that would oscillate between 50 and 150 years. Only land use under state control would be allowed. The party also calls for "guaranteed free healthcare" for all citizens of Ukraine, with private healthcare becoming nationalized.

The party derives its name from "derzhavnyk", a term used to refer to supporters of Ukrainian independence and statehood. On Donbas and Crimea, the party argues that both regions are inherently part of Ukraine, but also believes that both regions should have extensive autonomy. According to Derzhava, Ukraine must fulfill the obligations of Minsk Agreements that would provide self-governance. In regards to Crimea, the party calls for increasing the autonomy of the Autonomous Republic of Crimea.
