= Skull mounts =

Taxidermy classification

Skull mounts, sometimes referred to as European mounts, western skull mounts, or western mounts, are a large portion of taxidermy work. Only the skull of the animal is displayed, which may have horns, antlers, or nothing attached to the skull depending on the animal. The mount does not take up much room because of the lack of neck and hide.

The traditional method of removing muscle and other flesh tissue leaving only the clean skull is boiling the entire head of the animal. This method was the first to be used in skull mounting; it is inexpensive, can produce a finished product in a day or less, and can be done with few supplies that can be found in any grocery or general supplies store.

Using dermestidae beetles to eat away flesh is a modern method of cleaning the skulls for skull mounts and is increasing in popularity.
