= KUCHMA Electoral Bloc of Political Parties =

Ukrainian political bloc

The KUCHMA Electoral Bloc of Political Parties, (Ukrainian: Виборчий блок політичних партій «КУЧМА») was a political alliance in Ukraine.

KUCHMA, the name of former president Leonid Kuchma, is a backronym that stands for "Конституція – Україна – Честь – Мир – Антифашизм", which is translated as Constitution – Ukraine – Honour – Peace – Antifascism.

The bloc had been organized for participation in the 2007 parliamentary election by Oleksandr Volkov, a businessman and former chief of staff to former president Leonid Kuchma. In that election, the bloc failed to enter the parliament, winning only 0.10% of the national vote.

The Bloc consisted of:

- Party "Union"
- All-Ukrainian Union "Center"
