= Kostiantyn Stohnyi =

Kostiantyn Petrovych Stohnyi
- Born: August 16, 1968 (age 58); Kyiv, Ukraine
- Spouse: Elena
- Children: 4 daughters
- Parents: PPetro Fedotovych Stohnyi (father); Lyudmila Vasylivna Lavrova (mother)
- Awards: order «For courage» of III degree, Golden phoenix, «Ivan Franko» award, Gratitude Medal, Medal of Honor, Medal from the grateful Afghan people.

Kostiantyn Petrovych Stohnyi (August 16, 1968, Kyiv, Ukraine) is a Ukrainian television journalist, anchorman, the author of famous TV programs such as In Time, Emergency News, The Country Must Know. He is the president of the international film festival Golden Pectoral.

== Personal life ==
Kostyantyn Petrovych Stohnyi was born on August 16, 1968, in Kyiv, Ukrainian SSR. His mother, Lyudmila Vasylivna (née Lavrova), worked as a storekeeper and his father, Petro Fedotovych Stohnyi, worked as a foreman. Kostiantyn Stohnyi is married and has four daughters.

== Military service ==
In 1986 Stohnyi was called up for military service where he was assigned to the USSR's Special Forces in Afghanistan. Awarded with military awards of the USSR: medal "For Military Merit", "For Distinction in Guarding the State Border of the USSR". The president of Afghanistan Mohammed Najibullah conferred "Medal from Grateful Afghan people" on Stohnyi. Nowadays, Kostiantyn Stognii's war decorations are in the museum of the Great Patriotic War (Kyiv).

== Education ==
In 1989, he entered the journalism faculty of Taras Shevchenko National University of Kyiv. He graduated from the faculty in 1994. In 2002 he graduated from the National Academy of Internal Affairs of Ukraine (Dnepropetrovsk).

== Career ==
After graduating from Taras Shevchenko National University of Kyiv, Kostiantyn Stohnyiwas on probation at different Soviet, Ukrainian and foreign editorial offices and agencies. The next stage in his life was a job in an American TV magazine National Geographic, in which he was the coordinator of a TV program Travelling the Countries of Former USSR. With his French colleagues, Stohnyi reported on radio covering the War in Transnistria. From 1998 to 2007 he worked at the Ukrainian TV channel Inter. Here Stohnyi created a number of TV programs about resonant criminal events and historical investigations.

Stohnyi's first project was an information program In Time. However, he received the highest prevalent popularity among television audience in 2002 as an anchorman for an analytical TV program Criminal. And later his popularity has grown thanks to an analytical program "The Country Should Know". Kostiantyn Stohnyi and his TV programs are becoming annual prize-winners of the most famous international journalistic ratings such as Golden Feather, Detective Fest, Golden Georgiy. In 2005 Stohnyi filled a position of the head of Documentaries and special projects studio. Simultaneously, his new author program Duty Camera was launched on Inter.

Historical events, lost cities, magic rituals, mysteries of the ancient – are the topics of Kostiantyn Stognii's special projects on Inter. For instance, in a special project City in Graves, Stohnyi revealed the archival materials of the war in Transdnistria, represented chronicle of events, and interviewed its veterans. He succeeded in communicating with a person who was in captivity. Thoroughly concealed truth about the tragedy in Bendery was revealed in Kostiantyn Stohnyi's journalistic investigation.

In 2008 Kostiantyn Stohnyi sets up his own journalistic agency of investigations, ZH.A.R.A. ZH.A.R.A. works out his new author project Emergency News for ICTV channel. In 2009 this TV program pretended to gain the leadership in nomination as "TV Program of the Year" at the annual nationwide award "Man of the Year". And its anchorman – Kostiantyn Stohnyi, was nominated by ICTV channel for the title of "Journalist of the Year in Mass Media Branch". In 2009 another Stohnyi 's author project was launched on ICTV – The Country Must Know.

Kostiantyn Stognii's studio came into limelight due to ZH.A.R.A. documentaries, shot in the hot spots of the world, following the traces of global events: seizure of hostages in Moscow theatre on Dubrovka, fall of shuttle, mortal tsunami in Thailand, SARS epidemic, emancipation of the pirates-captured ship Faina, including the tapes, shot in the areas of combat operations: Kosovo, Transdniestria, Iraq, Pankisskoe ravine (the border of Georgia and Chechnya), Somalia, Afghanistan.

Since the year 2003 Stohnyi has been an author of documentaries. During this period of time he has created 58 documentary projects, such as:

• Lifeline – year 2003, expedition to Iraq. For this film the president of Iraq Saddam Hussein conferred the Medal of Gratitude on Kostiantyn Stohnyi;

• God Coffin Guard – year 2003, expedition to Syria;

• Kadorskoe Ravine – year 2006, expedition to Georgia. For this film the president of Georgia Eduard Shevernadze conferred the Medal of Honour on Kostiantyn Stognii;

• Tsunami – year 2004, expedition to Thailand;

• Object 100 Mystery – year 2008, expedition to Puerto Rico;

• In Shaitan’s Captivity – year 2009, expedition to Afghanistan;

• Secret Services War – year 2010, expedition to Somalia;

• The Last Hitler’s Secret – year 2011, Chile – Argentina – Antarctica;

• Maya. End of the World – year 2012, Mexico – Guatemala.

In 2011 Kostiantyn Stohnyi initiated the creation of a TV serial Picture in Chalk. This is the first film in Ukraine, based on real criminal business. The film hit the screen on December 16, 2011, on ICTV channel, ranking very high among the TV audience.

In March 2012, Kostiantyn Stohnyi organized his new expedition to Mexico and Guatemala. For more than 20 days Kostiantyn Stohnyi together with his survey squad and expedition members collected the information, facts and documents about the ancient Maya civilization. The expedition discovered the ruins of the ancient city Atlan at the bottom of the lake Isabal (Guatemala).

Kostiantyn Stohnyi has already arranged the collected facts in the documentary Maya. End of the World. This film will ruin the stereotypes about Maya Indians and their calendar, which were imposed on people's minds by American yellow press as far back as the beginning of the previous century.

== Home affairs body service ==
He served at metropolitan Criminal Investigation Department, later on – at the central Department of the Interior of Ukraine.

In the year 2004 the president of Ukraine Leonid Kuchma decorated Kostiantyn Stohnyi with a third class order For Courage.

== Books ==
Konstantin Stohnyi is the author of a number of documentary books and adventure novels:

1. "Department of the Interior Resonant Business"
2. "Kriminal"
3. "A Real Detective" – the book became a winner at the 7th International festival of books’ publishers and distributors. Stognii won the festival's main prize – "Golden Phoenix" in the nomination "Readers’ Choice".
4. "Exotic Places of the Planet". This book was also awarded with a special prize at the book festival "The World of the Book"
5. "The Golden Ten of Anti-Terrorist Squad" – this book was awarded by the book festival "The World of the Book".
6. "Treasures of the Maya and Armageddon." The reason for this book's appearance was Constantine Stohnyi 's trip to Mexico and Guatemala. There he studied the phenomenon of the "Mayan calendar", which was believed to predict the end of the world in December 2012. After overcoming thousands of miles, visiting many of Mayan cities, expedition finally discovered the ancient city of Atlan, lying on the bottom of Izabal lake. Stohnyi 's crew visited the capital of the kingdom of Baakal - Palenque, and there, in the Temple of Inscriptions, they ultimately uncovered the mystery of the ancient Mayan civilization.
7. In search of happiness. The Asian diary;
8. The debut adventure novel Pangapu first came out in 2015. Based on the expedition to the islands of Oceania, it was published three times - twice in Ukraine and once more in the USA.
9. Tibet, or the Emerald Cup of the Patriarch (2016);
10. Lake Isabal, or the Secret Code of Death (2016);
11. Wolves do not eat grass (2017);
12. The Lost Gospel trilogy was published in 2018-2019
13. Romance Scams 2020-2021
