= Platform for Life and Peace =

Parliamentary group in Ukraine

Platform for Life and Peace Платформа за життя та мир
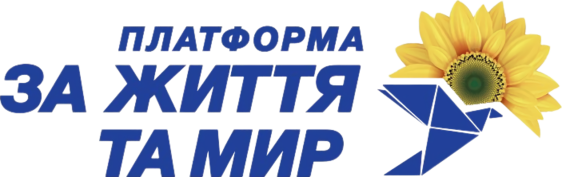
- Abbreviation: PZZhM or PLP
- Leader: Yuriy Boyko
- Founder: Yuriy Boyko
- Founded: 21 April 2022
- Preceded by: Opposition Platform — For Life
- Ideology: Social democracy; Pro-Europeanism (claimed); Russophilia (denied)
- Political position: Centre-left
- Verkhovna Rada: 21 / 450

The Platform for Life and Peace (Ukrainian: Платформа за життя та мир, romanized: Platforma za zhyttia ta myr, pronounced [plɐtˈfɔrmɐ zɐ ʒɪˈtʲːɑ tɐ ˈmɪr]; PZZhM/ПЗЖМ) is a parliamentary group in Ukraine created after the ban on the Opposition Platform — For Life and the dissolution of the parliamentary group of the same name following the Russian invasion of Ukraine in 2022.

== History ==
After the events of Euromaidan, the Party of Regions de-facto ceased to exist, most of its former members founded the Opposition Bloc.

In the 2014 parliamentary elections, the Opposition Bloc took 4th place, gaining 9.43% of the votes and receiving 31 seats in the Verkhovna Rada of Ukraine of the VIII convocation.

In November 2018, For Life and the Opposition Bloc united into the Opposition Platform — For Life, however, disagreements that arose on the basis of this inter-party association led to a split in the ranks of the Opposition Bloc and the exit of Yevheniy Murayev from the For Life party, who created his own political force Nashi.

In the 2019 presidential elections, the OPZZh candidate Yuriy Boyko took 4th place, receiving the support of 11.67% of voters (2,206,216 votes). In the 2019 parliamentary elections, the Opposition Platform — For Life received 13.05% support (1,908,087 votes) on party lists, and 6 candidates also qualified in majoritarian constituencies. Thus, the party received 44 seats in the Verkhovna Rada of Ukraine of the IX convocation.

After the Russian invasion of Ukraine began, OPZZh took a pro-Ukrainian position, although collaboration was widespread among party members.

Opposition Platform — For Life was one of several political parties suspended by the National Security and Defense Council of Ukraine on 20 March 2022, along with Derzhava, Left Opposition, Nashi, Opposition Bloc, Party of Shariy, Progressive Socialist Party of Ukraine, Socialist Party of Ukraine, Union of Leftists, and the Volodymyr Saldo Block.

At the 24 March 2022 parliamentary sitting, five MPs announced their resignation from the Opposition Platform — For Life faction. Meanwhile parliament itself was consulting with the Ministry of Justice on actions against the party's remaining deputies, as Ukrainian law did not provide for a single mechanism for suspending the activities of the party represented in parliament.

On 14 April 2022, the party's parliamentary group was dissolved in Ukraine's parliament.

The group was created on April 21, 2022, with Yuriy Boyko as its leader.

The group explicitly announced that it did not include Viktor Medvedchuk, Vadim Rabinovich, Vadim Stolar, and their supporters, who had belonged to the prior Opposition Platform — For Life party. Some of these politicians had left Ukraine before the invasion started, or are perceived as proxies for Russia within Ukraine.

On 19 January 2025, the National Security and Defense Council of Ukraine imposed personal sanctions against the group's leader, Yuriy Boyko.

In May 2025, the Platform voted to ratify the Ukraine–United States Mineral Resources Agreement.

== Criticism ==
On 22 July 2025, the party voted by an overwhelming majority (18 out of 21 deputies, with 3 absent) in favour of draft law 12414, which restricts the National Anti-Corruption Bureau of Ukraine and the Specialized Anti-Corruption Prosecutor's Office. The law sparked a wave of nationwide anti-corruption protests.

== Policies ==
Before its ban, OPZZh was a pro-Russian party.

According to Yuriy Boyko, the group contains "deputies willing to work for protecting Ukraine, helping the people, and rebuilding our country".

The group supported the accession of Ukraine to the European Union and Ukraine's accession to NATO.

The parliamentary group continues to advocate for the protection of the Russian language in Ukraine, the preservation of historical toponyms, and opposes the ban on the Ukrainian Orthodox Church (Moscow Patriarchate).

== See also ==
- Restoration of Ukraine
