= Opposition Platform – For Life =

Former pro-Russian political party in Ukraine

Opposition Platform – For Life: Опозицiйна платформа – За життя (Ukrainian); Оппозиционная платформа – За жизнь (Russian)
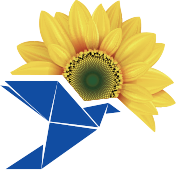
- Abbreviation: OPZZh; OPFL
- Leader: Yuriy Boyko
- Chairman of the Executive Committee: Serhiy Lyovochkin
- Founders: Yuriy Boyko; Vadim Rabinovich; Viktor Medvedchuk; Dmytro Firtash
- Founded: 9 December 1999 (All-Ukrainian Union "Center"); 26 July 2016 (For Life); 9 November 2018 (Opposition Platform – For Life)
- Banned: 20 March 2022 (suspended); 14 April 2022 (dissolved in Parliament); 20 June 2022 (banned in court); 15 September 2022 (final appeal in court dismissed)
- Merger of: Opposition Bloc (Note: Supporters of Dmytro Firtash's and Yuriy Boyko's factions); For Life; Ukraine – Forward!; Party of Development of Ukraine; Ukrainian Choice members
- Succeeded by: Platform for Life and Peace; Restoration of Ukraine
- Headquarters: Mechnykova 14/1, Kyiv
- Youth wing: Youth wing of OPZZh
- Paramilitary wing: Patriots For Life
- Ideology: Social democracy; Left-wing populism; Russophilia
- Political position: Centre to left-wing
- Colours: Blue; Green; Yellow
- Verkhovna Rada (2019): 43 / 450 (10%)
- Regions (2020): 4,215 / 43,122 (10%)

Website
- zagittya.com.ua

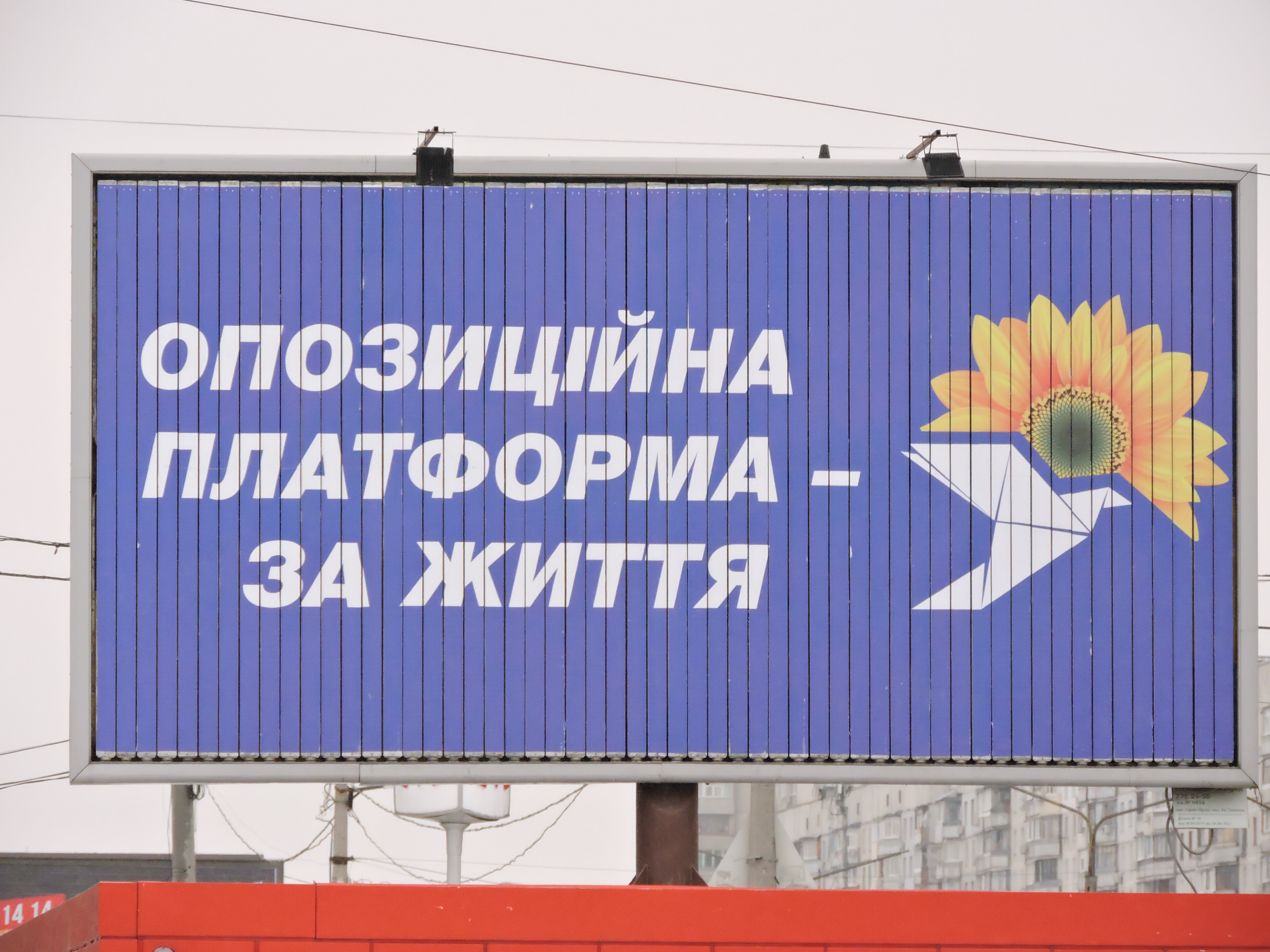
Opposition Platform – For Life billboard in Saltivka, Kharkiv

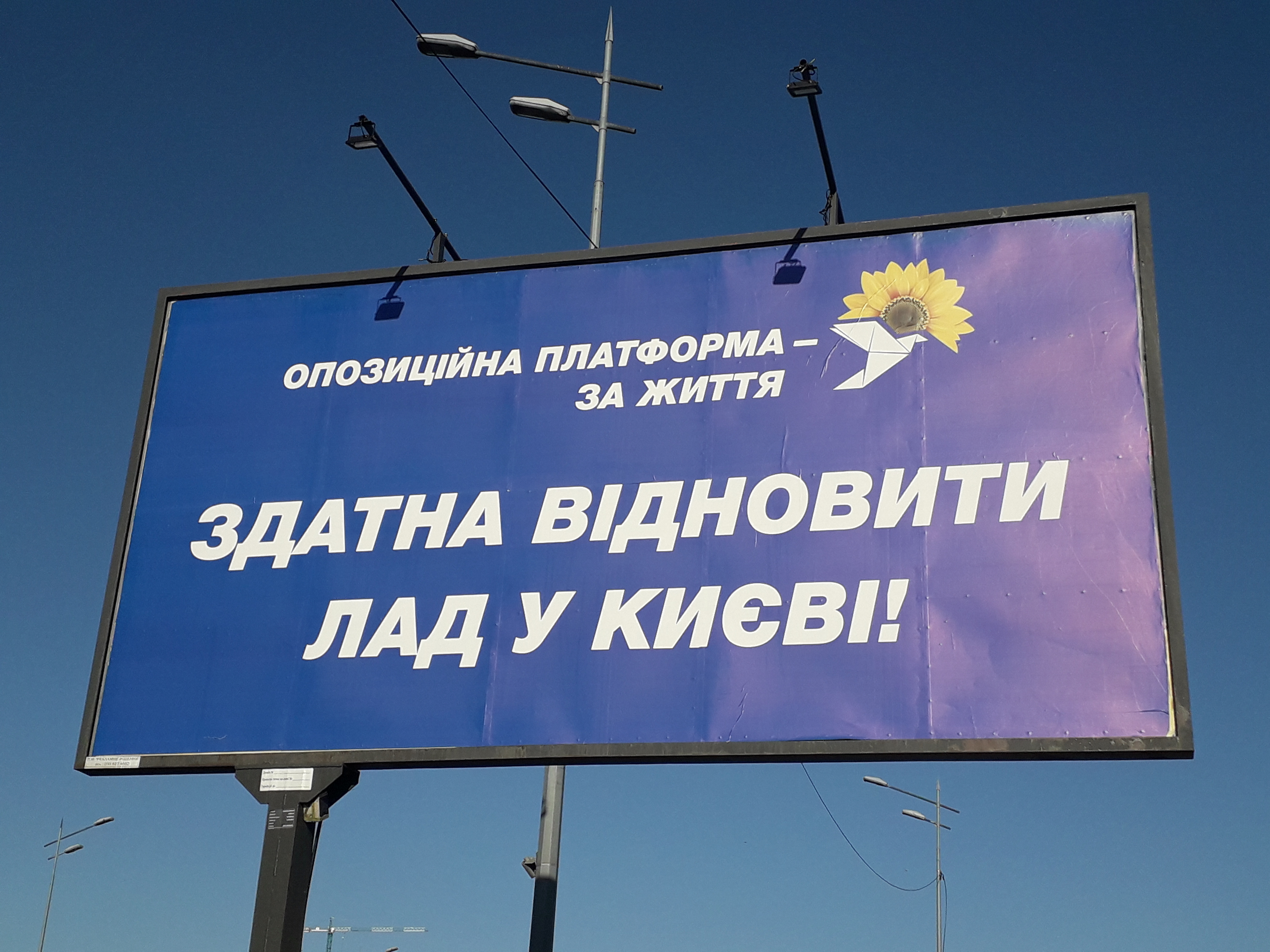
Agitation billboard of the party in Kyiv during the 2020 Ukrainian local elections: "Opposition Platform – For Life is capable of restoring order in Kyiv!"

The Opposition Platform – For Life (Ukrainian: Опозиційна платформа – За життя, romanized: Opozytsiina platforma – Za zhyttia; Russian: Оппозиционная платформа – За жизнь, romanized: Oppozitsionnaya platforma – Za zhizn', OPZZh) was a pro-Russian and Eurosceptic political party in Ukraine banned after the 2022 Russian invasion.

The party was the successor of For Life (Ukrainian: За життя, Russian: За жизнь) formerly All-Ukrainian Union "Center" from 1999 to 2016, a small pro-Russian political party. It was registered in December 1999. In the 2019 Ukrainian parliamentary election, the party won 37 seats on the nationwide party list and six constituency seats. Although it espoused pro-Russian policies, the party publicly denounced the Russian invasion of Ukraine on 8 March 2022.

On 20 March 2022, its activities were suspended by the National Security and Defense Council for the period of martial law due to allegations of having ties to Russia made by the Council. On 14 April, the party's parliamentary group was dissolved in Ukraine's parliament. On 21 April, twenty-five of the party's former deputies formed a new parliamentary group called "Platform for Life and Peace" (Ukrainian: Платформа за життя та мир). On 20 June, the party was banned by court. On 15 September 2022, the final appeal against this ban was dismissed by the Supreme Court of Ukraine.

== History ==
=== All-Ukrainian Union "Center" ===
At the 2002 Ukrainian parliamentary election the party won only 0.16% of the votes as part of National Movement Bloc along with People's Movement of Ukraine for Unity. During the legislative elections of 26 March 2006, the party was part of the Opposition Bloc "Ne Tak". In the 30 September 2007 elections, the party failed as part of the Electoral Bloc of Political Parties "KUCHMA" to win parliamentary representation. The party did not participate in the 2012 parliamentary elections. For the 2014 Ukrainian parliamentary election, the party joined Opposition Bloc along with other five parties; in these elections Opposition Bloc won 29 seats.

=== For life ===
In July 2016, former members of Opposition Bloc Vadim Rabinovich and Yevhen Murayev reconstituted the party under the name For Life. In September 2018, Murayev left For Life and five days later created the new political party Ours (Nashi). The Ministry of Justice of Ukraine did not register the name change of All-Ukrainian Union "Center".

=== Foundation of Opposition Platform – For Life ===
According to Ukrayinska Pravda, the negotiations on the unification of the parties For Life and Opposition Bloc started in the summer of 2018. Ukrayinska Pravda claims these talks were instigated by Serhiy Lyovochkin who, along with Dmytro Firtash, controlled one of the wings of Opposition Bloc, whereas Rinat Akhmetov controlled the other wing of Opposition Bloc. In early November 2018, the Opposition Bloc members loyal to Akhmetov decided to take pause the negotiations.

On 5 November 2018, one of Russian president Vladimir Putin's closest associates and chief of staff to former Ukrainian president Leonid Kuchma, Viktor Medvedchuk was elected chairman of the party For Life political party's council. Medvedchuk was also leader of the Ukrainian Choice NGO, a socially conservative pro-Russian political group and partially prohibited in Ukraine as openly anti-Ukrainian.

On 9 November 2018, Opposition Bloc chairman Yuriy Boyko and For Life signed an agreement (called Opposition Platform – For Life) for cooperation in the 2019 Ukrainian presidential election and the parliamentary election of the same year. The same day, Opposition Bloc leading members Vadym Novynskyi and Borys Kolesnikov claimed the agreement was a "personal initiative" of Boyko and that the party had not taken any decisions on cooperation with For Life.

Opposition Bloc members, Ukraine – Forward! and Party of Development of Ukraine joined the Opposition Platform – For Life alliance on 17 November 2018. The same day, Opposition Platform – For Life nominated Boyko as its candidate in the 2019 Ukrainian presidential election.

After Boyko was excluded from the parliamentary faction of the Opposition Bloc (the reason given was "because they betrayed their voters'" interests), on 20 November 2018 he announced the creation of a new parliamentary group called Opposition Platform – For Life. According to Boyko, part of Opposition Bloc is to join this new parliamentary group and he claimed "we have several offers from MPs belonging to other groups".

On 13 December 2018, it was announced that a new party, called Opposition Platform – For Life, had been formed.

Boyko's official nomination was announced on 17 November. Because Opposition Platform – For Life was not yet registered as a party in January 2019, it could not nominate him as a presidential candidate. Hence on 17 January 2019 Boyko submitted documents to the Central Election Commission of Ukraine for registration as a self-nominated candidate. (Note: Also in January 2019 Yuriy Boyko's former Opposition Bloc fellow faction member Oleksandr Vilkul was nominated for the presidency by Opposition Bloc - Party for Development and Peace (the recently renamed Industrial Party of Ukraine). According to Liga.net Rinat Akhmetov had renamed Industrial Party of Ukraine to Opposition Bloc – Party for Development and Peace solely to circumvent the courts injunction of 20 December 2018 (which prohibited any changes to the statute of the (party) Opposition Bloc, this lawsuit was filed by People's Deputy of Ukraine for Opposition Bloc Serhiy Larin).) In the election Boyko took fourth place with 11.67% of the total vote.

=== 2019 parliamentary election and 2020 local elections ===
Top 10 Opposition Platform – For life candidates in the 2019 parliamentary elections
- Yuriy Boiko
- Vadym Rabinovych
- Viktor Medvedchuk
- Natalya Korolevska
- Serhiy Lyovochkin
- Vasyl Nimchenko
- Nestor Shufrych
- Serhiy Larin
- Serhiy Dunaev
- Taras Kozak

In the 2019 Ukrainian parliamentary election the party won 37 seats (13.05% of the total votes) on the nationwide party list and 6 constituency seats. 11.4% of the party's elected deputies were women.

In the October 2020 Ukrainian local elections Opposition Platform – For Life took third place with 11.75% of all votes being cast to the party. (The highest number of seats in the election was won by Servant of the People with 17.59% of local deputies nominated in the election by this party. Second place was for Fatherland with 12.39%.) The party was successful in South and Eastern Ukraine, although the local parties of city mayors (in particular in Odesa, Mykolaiv and Sloviansk) cost them support compared with its predecessor Opposition Bloc in the 2015 Ukrainian local elections. Oleksandr Popov, former head of the Kyiv City State Administration, was a candidate for Mayor of Kyiv nominated by OPFL. In the election he received 68,757 votes, securing second place but losing the election to incumbent Mayor Vitali Klitschko. Konstyantyn Pavlov from the OPFL won the election for mayor of Kryvyi Rih.

=== Grenade attack and call for impeachment ===
On 3 July 2020, a grenade was thrown into the party's office in Poltava, and one person was injured as a result of the explosion.

Following the enactment of Ukrainian sanctions imposed on fellow party member Taras Kozak and his media outlets on 2 February 2021, the party's deputies began moving to initiate an impeachment of President Volodymyr Zelenskyy.

=== 2022 Russian invasion and banning ===
As of early 2022, its leadership consisted of Rabinovich and Boyko (co-chairs), Medvedchuk (head of Political Council, chair of Strategic Council) and Serhiy Lovochkin (chair of the Executive Committee).

On 24 February 2022, Russia launched a full-scale invasion of Ukraine. On this day party member Illia Kyva expressed support for the invasion and blamed the war on Ukrainian president Volodymyr Zelenskyy and urged him to resign. On 3 March 2022, Kyva was expelled from the party. On 15 March 2022, parliament deprived Kyva of his mandate as a People's Deputy.

On 7 March 2022, the party deprived Medvedchuk, who was charged with high treason in May 2021, of the post of co-chairman of the party, making Yuriy Boyko the sole chairman. Medvedchuk had escaped his house arrest on 28 February 2022. On 14 April, he was apprehended once again.

On 7 March 2022, the party also demanded "from the leadership of the Russian Federation to stop the aggression against Ukraine and calls on the participants of the negotiation process to immediately decide on a ceasefire and withdrawal of all Russian troops from Ukraine." The party also decided to support the participation of members of the Territorial Defense Forces to protect critical infrastructure, housing and looting and to support humanitarian corridors for the withdrawal of civilians.

Opposition Platform – For Life was one of several political parties suspended by the National Security and Defense Council of Ukraine on 20 March 2022, along with Derzhava, Left Opposition, Nashi, Opposition Bloc, Party of Shariy, Progressive Socialist Party of Ukraine, Socialist Party of Ukraine, Union of Leftists, and the Volodymyr Saldo Block.

At the 24 March 2022 parliamentary sitting five MPs announced their resignation from the Opposition Platform – For Life faction. Meanwhile, parliament itself was consulting with the Ministry of Justice on actions against the party's remaining deputies, as Ukrainian law did not provide for a single mechanism for suspending the activities of the party represented in parliament.

On 26 March 2022, the faction Opposition Platform – For Life in the Odesa Oblast Council ceased to exist. 18 deputies joined the newly formed deputy group Our Home is Ukraine.

On 14 April 2022, the party's parliamentary group was dissolved in Ukraine's parliament.

On 21 April 2022, the Opposition Platform – For Life deputies in Ukraine's national parliament formed a new parliamentary group. The group was named "Platform for Life and Peace" (Ukrainian: Платформа за життя та мир) and headed by Boyko and consisted of 25 MPs. On 11 May 2022 The Opposition Platform – For Life faction in the Kharkiv City Council ceased to exist. 16 of the party's 18 deputies created the parliamentary group "Restoration of Ukraine".

On 20 June 2022, the Eighth Administrative Court of Appeal banned the party. The property of the party and all its branches were transferred to the state. The decision was open to appeal at the Supreme Court of Ukraine within 20 days. At the time Opposition Platform – For Life was one of two of the 20 March 2022 suspended parties that was subject to an attempt of getting banned in court, Opposition Platform – For Life was the only party to defend and participate in the case. (The other party was the Progressive Socialist Party of Ukraine.) On 15 September 2022, the final appeal against the party's ban was dismissed by the Supreme Court of Ukraine, meaning that the party was fully banned in Ukraine.

== Policies ==
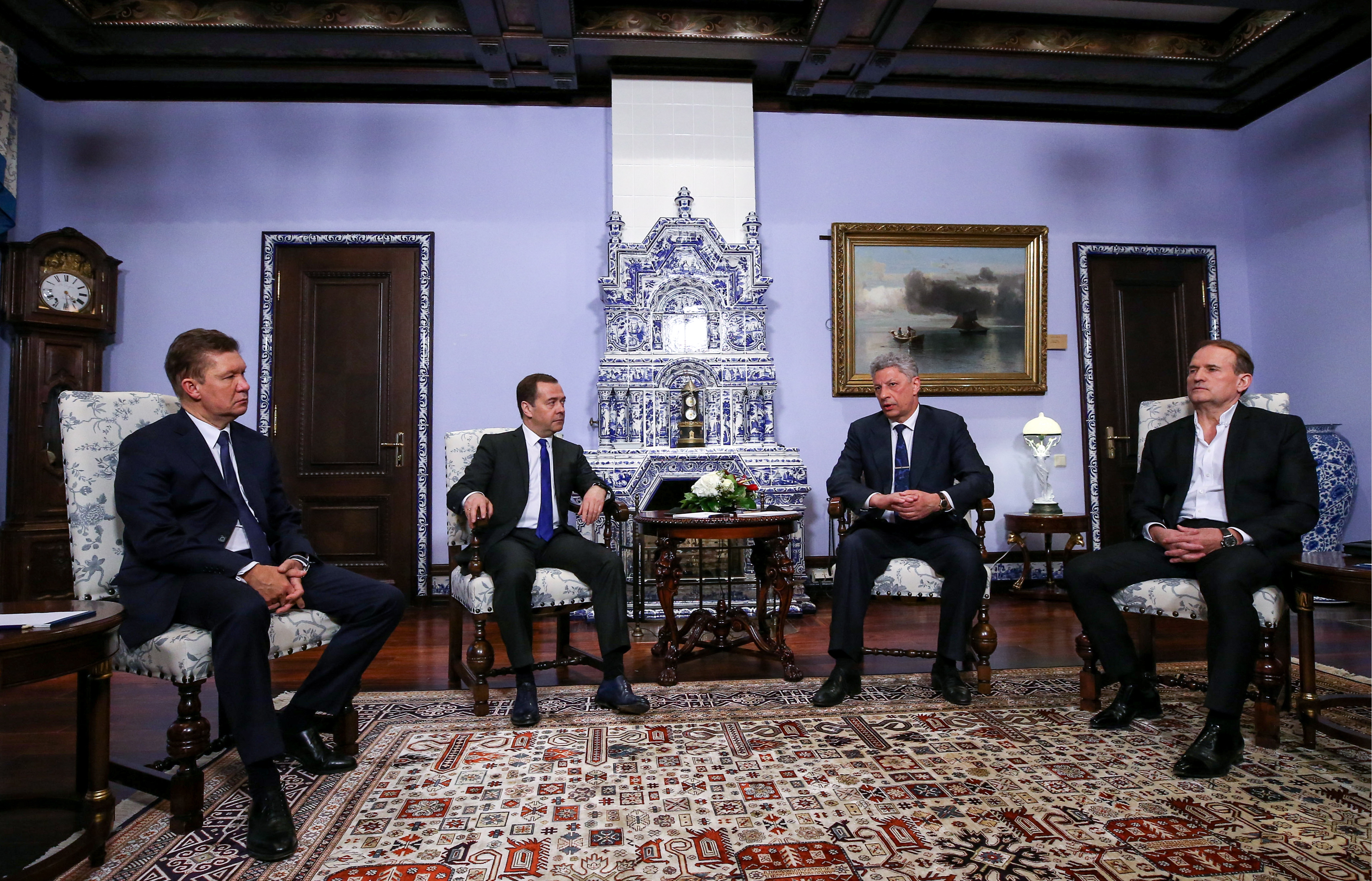
Meeting between Russian government officials and OPFL leaders in March 2019

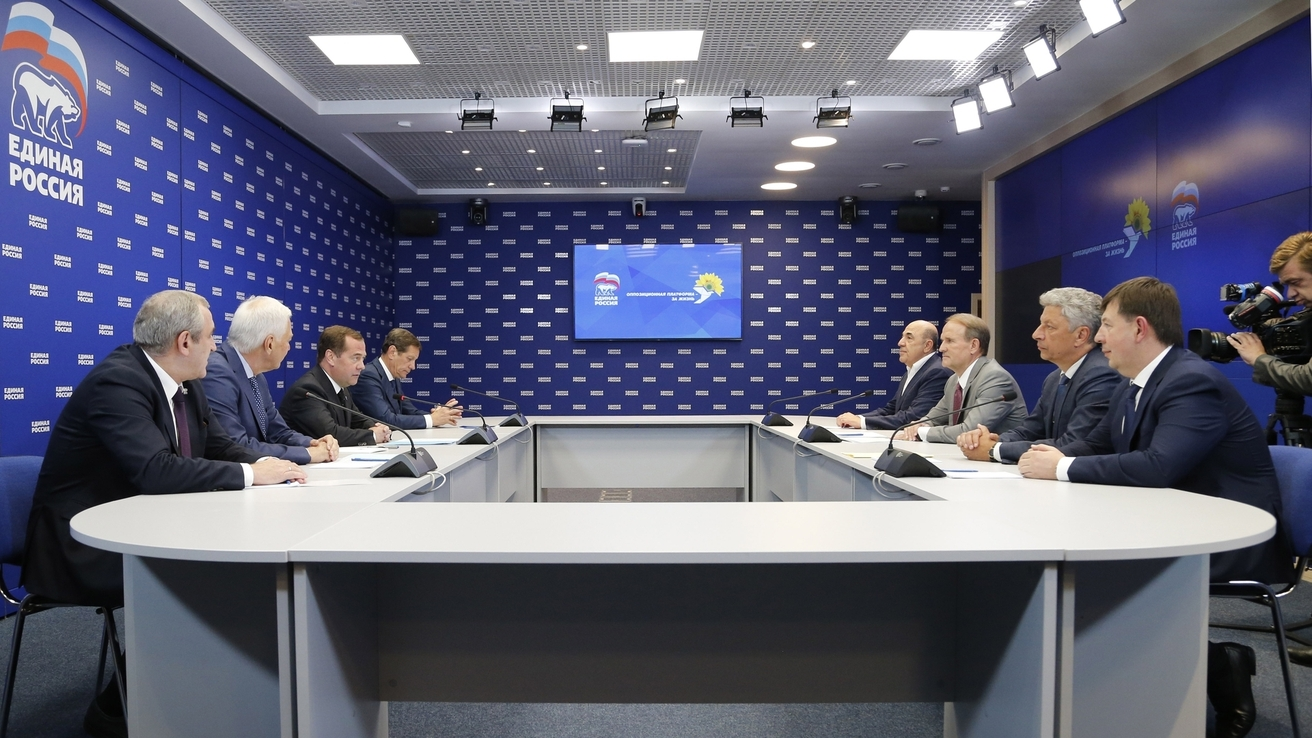
Meeting of top politicians from United Russia and the OPFL in July 2019

The ideological platform of the party is composed of various ideological currents, such as social democracy, Russophilia, and Euroscepticism. The party's electoral program for the 2019 election was entitled "Peace! Responsibility! Care!" It promotes policies such as settlement of the conflict with Russia, reconstruction of Donbas through compromise with Russia and federalism, and establishment of a 'social economy' that would focus on developing social welfare and increasing social spending to provide accessible medicine and social security. The party was decisively positioned on the left economically, but included both conservative and liberal policies in its sociocultural outlook. It was also described as left-populist.

In the party election program for the 2019 Ukrainian parliamentary election, the party promised to undo decommunization, lustration, Ukrainization policies, and renegotiate the Ukraine–European Union Association Agreement while reviving trade with the CIS countries. The group wanted the "neutrality of Ukraine in the military-political sphere and non-participation in any military-political alliances." As a means of fighting poverty, the party advocated the "reduction of gas tariffs for the population of Ukraine to ₴3,800–4,000 per thousand cubic meters due to direct gas supplies from the Russian Federation." The party wanted to end the War in Donbas by negotiating directly with the Donetsk People's Republic and the Luhansk People's Republic. Other positions set out in its electoral programme include granting "autonomous status to Donbas as an integral part of Ukraine" by amending the Constitution and laws of Ukraine; the right to speak, communicate, study in Russian; decentralisation of governance; stronger mechanisms against corrupt politicians; "an end to deindustrialization, degradation and deintellectualization"; a stronger social state; constitutional amendment to ensure neutrality; and "revision of the bondage conditions" of Ukraine's participation in the World Trade Organization; and a free trade agreement with the European Union.

At a conciliation council among leaders of parliamentary factions on 17 February 2020, Vadim Rabinovych urged the sending of a Ukrainian delegation to participate in the 9 May victory parade in Moscow and started to sing the Soviet song "The Sacred War" ("Rise Up, the Mighty Country). The party celebrates Red Army veterans by marking occasions like the Victory Day over Nazism in World War II and the Day of Liberation of Ukraine from Fascist Invaders.

During hostile relations between Russia and Ukraine, the parliamentary deputy group of Opposition Platform – For Life sent its delegation as official parliamentary delegation of Ukraine to Russia's State Duma on 10 March 2020. The OPFL delegation was met with a standing ovation in the State Duma. Soon after information about the trip appeared, the press service office of the Verkhovna Rada denied that the parliament had commissioned the delegation to conduct any negotiations with Duma representatives and no official documents had been issued for the foreign visit of the delegation.

After Russia invaded Ukraine on 24 February 2022 on 8 March 2022 the party voiced its stance on this. The party stated that it "demands from the leadership of the Russian Federation to stop the aggression against Ukraine and calls on the participants of the negotiation process to immediately decide on a ceasefire and withdrawal of all Russian troops from Ukraine." The party also decided to support the participation of members of the Territorial Defense Forces to protect critical infrastructure, housing and looting and to support humanitarian corridors for the withdrawal of civilians.

== Election results ==
Opposition Platform – For Life support (% of the votes cast) in different regions of Ukraine in the 2019 parliamentary election.

=== Verkhovna Rada ===
All-Ukrainian Union Center

Year	Popular vote	% of popular vote	Overall seats won	Seat change	Government
2006	Opposition Bloc "Ne Tak"		0 / 450	0	Extra-parliamentary
2007	KUCHMA Electoral Bloc of Political Parties		0 / 450	0	Extra-parliamentary
2014	Opposition Bloc		29 / 450	▲29	Opposition

Opposition Platform – For Life

Year	Popular vote	% of popular vote	Overall seats won	Seat change	Government
2019	1,908,111	13.06	43 / 450	▲43	Opposition

=== Presidential elections ===
Year	Candidate	First round			Second round		Won/Loss
Year	Candidate	Votes	%	Rank	Votes	%	Won/Loss
2019	Yuriy Boyko	2,206,216	11.82%	4th	Eliminated		Loss

=== Local councils ===
Election	Performance				Rank
Election	%	± pp	Seats	+/–	Rank
2020	9.94%	New	4,215 / 43,122	New	4th

== International cooperation ==
The party had international cooperation agreements with the following parties:

- Russia: United Russia
- France: National Rally
- Israel: Yisrael Beiteinu
