= Republican Party of Ukraine =

Political party in Ukraine

The Republican Party of Ukraine (Ukrainian: Республіканська Партія України) is a political party in Ukraine registered in March 2005. At the legislative elections of 26 March 2006, the party was part of the Opposition Bloc "Ne Tak". The party did not participate in the 2007 election.
