= Ne Tak =

Political alliance in Ukraine

Opposition Bloc "Ne Tak" Опозиційний блок "Не Так"
- Chairperson: Viktor Medvedchuk
- Founded: 2006
- Split from: Social Democratic Party of Ukraine (united); Republican Party of Ukraine; Women for the Future "All-Ukrainian Union Center"
- Headquarters: Kyiv
- Ideology: Social democracy Euroscepticism; Russophilia
- Political position: Centre
- Colours: Red Blue

The Opposition Bloc "Ne Tak", (Ukrainian: Опозиційний Блок "Не Так", lit. 'Not So!') is a former pro-Russian political alliance in Ukraine. One of the leaders of the alliance was Viktor Medvedchuk.

== Background ==
The coalition formed in the Ukrainian parliament at the beginning of 2004 with the participation of the Social Democratic Party of Ukraine (united) and the Party of Regions has already then it also focused on the general participation in the elections of people's deputies of the Verkhovna Rada in 2006. In the spring of 2005, as N. Shufrych, despite the fact that most of the regional organizations of the SDPU(u) supported the independent participation of the party in the elections, it was decided to go as part of a bloc in which the SDPU(u) saw the Party of Regions of Ukraine as its main ally. However, negotiations with the PR on blocking ended in vain due to the lack of a real desire for the PR to block with the SDPU (u): apparently, the leadership of the PR really imagined that an alliance with the SDPU (u) for the PR would rather alienate part of their electorate. Nestor Shufrich testified in 2007: "We in the SDPU(u) really hoped that there would be an opposition bloc between us and the Party of Regions. But the PR said that she was going on her own, and the bloc where the SDPU(o) could have been taken was simply not created".

== Block program ==
The bloc opposed Ukraine's accession to NATO ("membership in NATO will force Ukraine to take part in military operations against countries that are not enemies of the Ukrainian people… upon joining NATO, Ukraine will lose a significant part of its sovereignty in the military-political and economic spheres… joining NATO will lead to a significant deterioration in relations with Russia ... Ukrainian society as a whole has a negative attitude towards the country's entry into the Alliance"), supported Ukraine's entry into the Common Economic Space.

== Election-2006 ==
The alliance consisted of:

- Social Democratic Party of Ukraine (united)
- Republican Party of Ukraine
- Women for the Future All-Ukrainian Political Union
- Political Party "All-Ukrainian Union Center"

In December 2005, the leader of the SDPU(u) Viktor Medvedchuk stated that the bloc would not enter into a coalition with the "orange". In the same place, V. Medvedchuk specified that "he includes not only Our Ukraine", "The Yulia Tymoshenko Bloc, the Pora-PRP bloc, Ukrainian People’s Bloc of Kostenko and Plyushch, but also the Socialist Party of Ukraine." The bloc was to seek partnership with the Party of Regions. According to the forecast of Leonid Kravchuk, who spoke at the same time, the bloc should gain 7–10% of the votes in the parliamentary elections.

December 23, 2005, and the leader of the election campaign of the Party of Regions Yevgeny Kushnarev stated that the "Ne Tak!" is a strategic partner of the Party of Regions of Ukraine. In January 2006, SDPU(o) leader Viktor Medvedchuk said that their bloc would definitely win the elections and be in parliament, stressing that at that time more than one million Ukrainians were members of the common bloc alone.

At the 2006 Ukrainian parliamentary election, March 26, 2006, it won 1.01% of the popular vote and no seats.

The results of the elections showed the political inconsistency of the SDPU(o) — for example, in AR Crimea, where the party had 28,000 party members, for the "Not so!" only 15,005 votes were cast. They received 257,106 votes – with more than one million members of the common bloc declared by V.V. Medvedchuk (the SDPU (o) had 405 thousand party members as of January 1, 2005).

=== Local elections in Ukraine (2006) ===
According to the results of elections of the Verkhovna Rada of Crimea and regional councils, the bloc received 4 mandates (3.09% of votes) in Crimea and 7 mandates (3.82% of votes) in the Zaporizhzhia Oblast Council.

In the elections of the mayor of Kyiv, the bloc supported the candidacy of Oleksandr Omelchenko.

== See also ==
- Opposition Bloc, a 2014 split of the Party of Regions
