= Opposition Bloc =

Political party in Ukraine

Opposition Bloc: Ukrainian: Опозиційний блок; Russian: Оппозиционный блок
- Chairman: Rinat Akhmetov (one wing); Dmytro Firtash & Yuriy Boyko (one wing)
- Founded: 23 April 2010 (Leading Force) 14 September 2014 (Opposition Bloc)
- Dissolved: 13 December 2018
- Merger of: Ex-Party of Regions' members; Ukraine – Forward!; Party of Development of Ukraine; Labour Ukraine; New Politics; "State Neutrality"
- Succeeded by: Opposition Bloc — Party for Peace and Development (Akhmetov's wing); Opposition Platform — For Life (Firtash's & Boyko's wing)
- Headquarters: Kyiv
- Ideology: Social liberalism; Regionalism; Russophilia; Euroscepticism
- Political position: Centre to centre-left
- Oligarch association: Donetsk Clan
- Colours: Blue; White
- Verkhovna Rada (2014): 29 / 450 (6%)
- Regions (2015): 4,026 / 158,399 (3%)

Website
- opposition.org.ua

The Opposition Bloc (Ukrainian: Опозиційний блок, romanized: Opozitsiyniy blok, Russian: Оппозиционный блок, romanized: Oppozitsionniy blok) was a pro-Russian political party in Ukraine that was founded in 2010 and renamed in 2014 by the merger of six parties that did not endorse Euromaidan. Legally, the party was created by renaming the lesser-known party "Leading Force". The party was perceived as the successor of the disbanded Party of Regions.

In the 2014 election, the party won 29 seats predominantly in the Dnipropetrovsk, Donetsk, Zaporizhzhia, Luhansk and Kharkiv oblasts. American lobbyist Paul Manafort acted as political consultant for the party.

By January 2019 two wings of the party nominated two different candidates for the 2019 Ukrainian presidential election. Yuriy Boyko for the Opposition Platform — For Life and Oleksandr Vilkul for Opposition Bloc — Party for Peace and Development (the recently renamed Industrial Party of Ukraine). Both these two offsprings of Opposition Bloc took part independently of each other in the 2019 Ukrainian parliamentary election, with the Opposition Bloc — Party for Peace and Development (also) named into Opposition Bloc.

== Party leaders ==
Chairman:

- Rinat Akhmetov (one wing)
- Dmytro Firtash & Yuriy Boyko (one wing)

Fraction in Verkhovna Rada leader:

- Vadym Novynskyi

== History ==
=== Party "Leading Force" ===
The party was registered at the Ukrainian Ministry of Justice on 23 April 2010 as "Leading Force" (Ukrainian: Ведуча сила, Russian: Ведущая сила). The party was led by Anatoly Kornienko.

The party did not participate in the 2012 parliamentary elections.

=== 2014 parliamentary elections ===
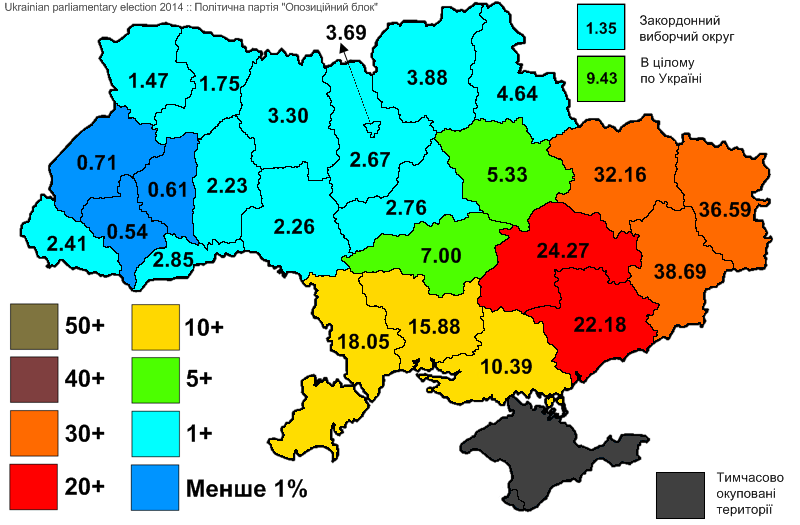
Opposition Bloc support (% of the votes cast) in different regions of Ukraine in the 2014 parliamentary election.

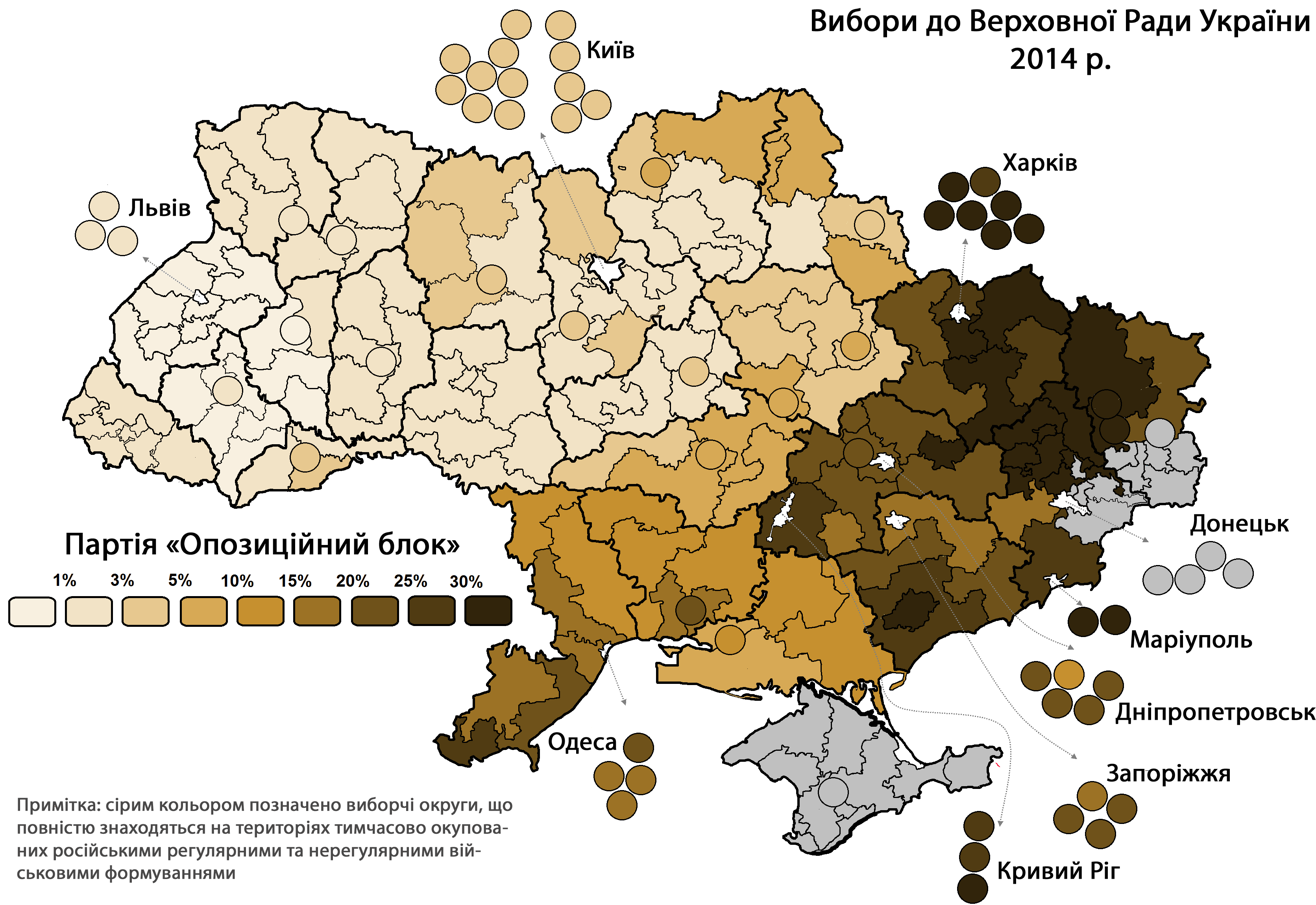
Opposition Bloc support (% of the votes cast) by district.

In September 2014 American lobbyist Paul Manafort was hired as an advisor to (former Manafort client) Viktor Yanukovych's former head of the Presidential Administration of Ukraine Serhiy Lyovochkin. Manafort was tasked with rebranding Party of Regions. Instead, he argued to help stabilize Ukraine, Manafort advised to create a new political party called Opposition Bloc. According to Ukrainian political analyst Mikhail Pogrebinsky "He thought to gather the largest number of people opposed to the current government, you needed to avoid anything concrete, and just become a symbol of being opposed".

It was planned that the biggest party in the previous 2012 parliamentary elections, Party of Regions, would be part of the Opposition Bloc in the 2014 parliamentary elections. This alliance was to be led by Serhiy Tihipko. But he refused to do so because in his opinion in this alliance there were "people tainted by corruption and to put it mildly, unpatriotic". Tihipko then became leader of (the revived) Strong Ukraine.

On 14 September 2014, the Party of Regions choose not to participate in the elections; it deemed the election lacking legitimacy because the residents of the Donbas could not vote in the election. Also on 14 September 2014, a forum took place in Kyiv with the banner "Peace. Stability. Revival", at the end of which Party of Development of Ukraine, Center All-Ukrainian Union, Ukraine – Forward!, Labour Ukraine, New Politics and "State neutrality" decided to take part in the 2014 parliamentary elections as Opposition Bloc. Many individual members of Party of Regions ended up as candidates of Opposition Bloc. Among them Yuriy Boyko, who headed the party's election list. Other main figures on this election list are Natalia Korolevska, Mykhailo Dobkin and Vadim Rabinovich. In September 2014 Boyko argued that Opposition Bloc does not represent parties, but consisted only of individual politicians. Boyko, Dobkin and Rabinovich all took part in the 2014 Ukrainian presidential election. In which they scored 0.19%, 3.03% and 2.25%. Korolevska and Boyko were both ministers in the second Azarov Government. Serhiy Lyovochkin was also a candidate of the party. Five members of Party of Regions were in the top 10 of the Opposition Bloc's electoral list.

The party won 29 seats; including the winning of 2 constituency seats. It won 2 constituency seats but for the nationwide party lists of the election (53.2% of the seats was elected by a nationwide party lists and 46.8% in 198 constituencies) the party gained most votes in all 14 constituencies in Kharkiv Oblast, all 6 constituencies in Luhansk Oblast (were voting was possible), 8 out of 9 in Zaporizhzhia Oblast (Petro Poroshenko Bloc winning the remaining constituency), in Dnipropetrovsk Oblast 10 out of 17 constituencies (Petro Poroshenko Bloc winning the remaining constituency), in Donetsk Oblast (were voting was possible) 6 out of 11 constituencies (Petro Poroshenko Bloc winning the remaining 5 constituencies). In Odesa Oblast 27 October preliminary result indicated that Petro Poroshenko Bloc had won 7 constituencies with the remaining 4 constituencies won by Opposition Bloc. In Mykolaiv Oblast Petro Poroshenko Bloc seemed to be the clear winner with winning 5 constituencies while the remaining constituency won by Opposition Bloc.

On 27 November 2014 an Opposition Bloc parliamentary faction of 40 people was formed (at the opening session of the new parliament).

The party was one of the winners of the 2015 Ukrainian local elections gaining nationwide 11.5%. It gained most (of all) votes South and East Ukraine (except of Kharkiv Oblast).

In May 2016 Rabinovich left the party and its parliamentary faction after a request from his party Center All-Ukrainian Union.

=== Cessation and 2019 creation of two succession parties ===
According to Ukrainska Pravda in the summer of 2018 negotiations on the unification of the parties For life and Opposition Bloc started. Ukrainska Pravda says these talks were instigated by Serhiy Lyovochkin who, along with Dmytro Firtash, controlled one of the wings of the party. While Rinat Akhmetov controlled the other wing of Opposition Bloc. Early November 2018 the party members loyal to Akhmetov decided to take a pause in the negotiations.

On 9 November 2018 Opposition Bloc chairman Boyko and Vadim Rabinovich's party For life signed an agreement for cooperation in the 2019 Ukrainian presidential election and the parliamentary election of the same year and created the alliance Opposition Platform — For life. The same day Opposition Bloc leading members Vadym Novynskyi and Borys Kolesnikov claimed the agreement was a "personal initiative" of Boyko and that the party had not take any decisions on cooperation with For life. On 17 November 2018 Opposition Platform — For life nominated Boyko as its candidate in the 2019 Ukrainian presidential election. The same day Opposition Bloc member Party of Development of Ukraine joined the Opposition Platform — For life alliance. On 20 November 2018 Boyko and Serhiy Lyovochkin (leading member of the Party of Development of Ukraine) were excluded from the Opposition Bloc faction (the reason given was) "because they betrayed their voters" interests.

On 17 December 2018 an Opposition Bloc congress nominated Oleksandr Vilkul as their candidate in the 2019 Ukrainian presidential election. But a Ukrainian court ruled three days before (in response to a lawsuit filed by People's Deputy of Ukraine for Opposition Bloc Serhiy Larin) that Opposition Bloc's congress at which Vikul was to be nominated could not "reorganize the party by any means". On 18 December 2018 the website of Opposition Bloc stated that therefore all the decisions made at the congress were invalid. On 20 December 2018 the website of Opposition Bloc was down. Vilkul was nominated for the presidency again by Opposition Bloc — Party of Peace and Development (the recently renamed Industrial Party of Ukraine) on 20 January 2019. According to Liga.net Rinat Akhmetov had renamed Industrial Party of Ukraine to Opposition Bloc — Party of Peace and Development solely to circumvent the courts injunction of 20 December 2018 (which prohibited any changes to the statute of the (party) Opposition Bloc). The Industrial Party of Ukraine was registered by the Ministry of Justice on 13 June 2014, and Rostyslav Shurma was then the chairman of this party. Shurma was at the time General Director of Zaporizhstal. Zaporizhstal is part of the industrial complex owned by Rinat Akhmetov.

Both these two offspring of Opposition Bloc took part independently of each other in the 2019 Ukrainian parliamentary election, with the Opposition Bloc — Party of Peace and Development (also) named into Opposition Bloc.

=== Shadow cabinet ===
On March 31, 2015, the Opposition Bloc announced the creation of a project for the Shadow cabinet of Ukraine, which, according to the authors, will develop bills in opposition to the policies of Kyiv. The composition of the shadow government of the Opposition Bloc is as follows:

- Prime Minister — Borys Kolesnikov
- Vice Prime Minister for Regional Policy — Mykhailo Dobkin
- Vice Prime Minister for Industry, New Industrialization and Reconstruction of Donbass — Oleksandr Vilkul
- Vice Prime Minister for Control over the Activities of Law Enforcement Agencies — Vadim Rabinovich
- Minister of Social Policy of Ukraine — Natalia Korolevska
- Minister of Economic Development and Trade — Yevhen Murayev
- Minister of Social Security — Mykhailo Papiyev
- Minister of Internal Affairs and Emergency Situations — Kostiantyn Stognii
- Minister of Health — Ihor Shurma
- Minister of Agriculture — Mykola Shishman
- Minister of Infrastructure and Transport — Volodymyr Shemaev
- Minister of Finance — Viktor Skarshevsky
- Minister of Justice — Yuriy Kotlyarov
- Minister of Education — Olena Kolesnikova
- Minister of Ecology and Natural Resources — Pavlo Zhila
- Minister of Foreign Affairs — Kostyantyn Gryshchenko

== Ideology and stances ==
According to Tadeusz Olszański, of the Centre for Eastern Studies, the party's 2014 election programme was socially liberal and pro-Russophone. The party's platform envisages protecting the status of Russian as a regional language.

The party wants "maximum decentralization" for Ukraine.

The party wants a non-aligned status for Ukraine and wants to prevent it from becoming a NATO member.

In the war in Donbas the party advocated to end the conflict by peaceful means and by negotiating with Russia and with the leaders of the Donetsk People's Republic and the Luhansk People's Republic. The party rejects the March 2014 annexation of Crimea by Russia and wants "peace in united Ukraine within the borders of 1991".

The party support Ukrainian's post-Maidan status as the only state language, but advocates to allow ethnic minorities to be able to define Russian and other minority languages as regional languages in their own communities. In 2017 Opposition Bloc MP's opposed the law that made Ukrainian the main language of public education, in 2018 they were against a draft bill that establishes Ukrainian as the obligatory language in all spheres of public life, and makes the violation of this legislation an administrative offense.

The party hopes to criminalize "the incitement of inter-regional hatred" and ban all organizations that promote "inter-regional hatred", use "violence as an instrument for political gain", or set up illegal paramilitary forces.

Other political wishes of the party are "the reduction of tax pressure", introduction of "advisory referendums and plebiscites", cancellation of "draconian pension reforms" and a referendum on the sale of agricultural land.

== Member parties ==
- Ukraine – Forward!
- Party of Development of Ukraine
- All-Ukrainian Union "Center" (Left the party in 2016)
- Labour Ukraine
- New Politics
- State Neutrality
- Party of Christian Socialists

== Election results ==
=== Verkhovna Rada ===
| Year | Popular vote | % of popular vote | Overall seats won | Seat change | Government |
|---|---|---|---|---|---|
| 2014 | 1,486,203 | 9.43 | 29 / 450 | New | Opposition |

Top 10 members of Opposition Bloc for the 2014 parliamentary elections

Yuriy Boyko · Oleksandr Vilkul · Mykhailo Dobkin · Vadym Rabinovych · Oleksiy Bilyi
Serhiy Larin · Nestor Shufrych · Natalia Korolevska · Tetiana Bakhteyeva · Mykola Skoryk

=== Local councils ===
| Election | Performance | | | | Rank |
| Election | % | ± pp | Seats | +/– | Rank |
|---|---|---|---|---|---|
| 2015 | 2.58% | New | 4,026 / 158,399 | New | 5th |

== See also ==
- Party of Regions
- Opposition Bloc "Ne Tak"
- Our Land
- Revival
