= Oleg Tsaryov =

Ukrainian-Russian politician, businessman, and separatist (born 1970)

- Олег Царёв; Олег Царьов
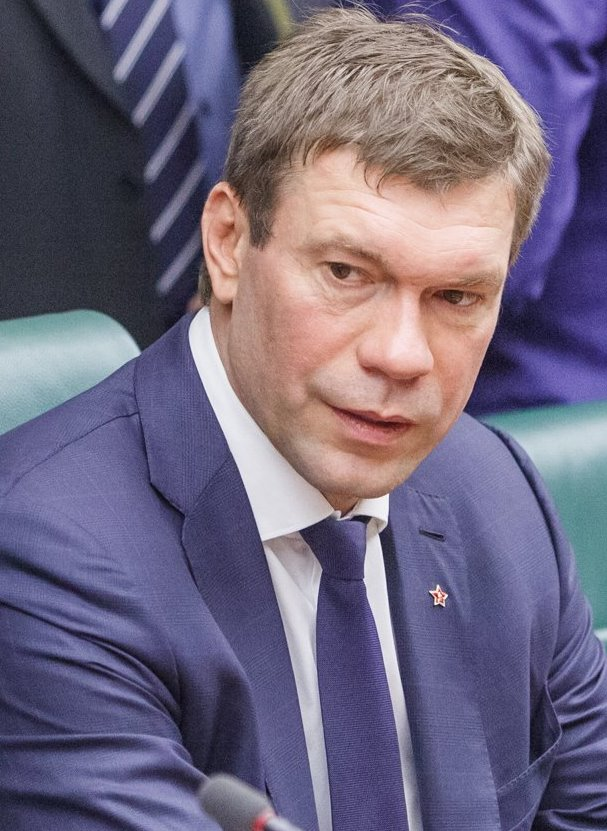
- Tsaryov in 2014

Speaker of the Parliament of Novorossiya
- In office 26 June 2014 – 18 May 2015
- Preceded by: Office established
- Succeeded by: Office abolished

People's Deputy of Ukraine
- In office 14 June 2006 – 27 November 2014
- In office 14 May 2002 – 25 May 2006

Personal details
- Born: 2 June 1970 (age 56) Dnipropetrovsk, Ukrainian SSR, Soviet Union (now Dnipro, Ukraine)
- Party: Party of Regions (until 2014)
- Education: National Research Nuclear University MEPhI
- Website: olegtsarov.com

Oleg Anatolyevich Tsaryov (Russian: Олег Анатольевич Царёв; Ukrainian: Олег Анатолійович Царьов, romanized: Oleh Anatoliiovych Tsariov; born 2 June 1970) is a Ukrainian and Russian businessman, politician and former separatist official in eastern Ukraine.

Tsaryov is a former People's Deputy of Ukraine elected for the Party of Regions in 2002, who was expelled from the party on 7 April 2014.

On 26 July 2014, he became the speaker of the Parliament of Novorossiya, a confederation that included the separatist Donetsk and Luhansk People's Republics, and served until its dissolution on 18 May 2015. He has been wanted by Ukrainian police since June 2014 for promoting separatism and violence.

== Biography ==
=== Early life ===
Tsaryov was born 2 June 1970 in Dnipropetrovsk (now Dnipro), in the Ukrainian SSR of the Soviet Union.

Tsaryov graduated from the Moscow Engineering Physics Institute in 1992 with a degree in Applied Physics.

=== Business career ===
Tsaryov started his career in 1992 as an engineer for the preparation of production at "Avteks" (Автекс), a specialized small business in Dnipropetrovsk. Then in 1993 he became head of the Ukrainian financial insurance company "Confidence" (Доверие). After leaving Confidence in 1995, he held a succession of senior positions at the Dnipropetrovsk Computer Centre Ltd (Днепропетровский компьютерный центр), a company called Silicon Valley (Кремниевая долина), and then the Dnipropetrovsk Paper Mill (Днепропетровская бумажная фабрика).

His company "Dniprobuminvest" went bankrupt in March 2014.

=== Election to national parliament ===
Tsaryov became a People's Deputy of Ukraine (народний депутат України) in the 2002 Ukrainian parliamentary election. He was elected in single mandate district number 40 located in Krynychky with 30.26% of the vote. In parliament he became a member of the faction United Ukraine and he later joined the Party of Regions.

In 2005 Tsaryov became head of the Dnipropetrovsk regional branch of Party of Regions.

In the 2006 Ukrainian parliamentary election Tsaryov was re-elected to parliament as number 35 on the election list of Party of Regions.

And again on the same list but now placed 114th in the 2007 Ukrainian parliamentary election.

In the 2012 Ukrainian parliamentary election Tsaryov was re-elected to parliament for Party of Regions again in single mandate district number 40. He was elected with 45.08% of the vote.

Tsaryov was one of the most ardent supporters a violent dispersal of the (2013–2014) Euromaidan protest. He called these protesters "terrorists, bandits and extremists."

=== 2014 pro-Russian unrest in Ukraine ===
Tsaryov was a self-nominated candidate in the 2014 Ukrainian presidential election. On 29 March a Party of Regions convention supported Mykhailo Dobkin nomination as a presidential candidate. On 7 April 2014 the political council of that party expelled Tsaryov from the party. On 11 April 2014 Tsaryov travelled to Donetsk and said he was ready to become a leader of the so-called "South-east movement". According to one source quoted by the National Press Agency of Ukraine, Tsaryov also assured separatists in Donetsk that would do everything to disrupt the May 25, 2014 presidential elections. "I'm sure that will be no elections," he said. He then promised that he would create a "central authority" within the center of Donetsk. On 14 April, Oleg Tsaryov was beaten by a mob after an interview in the ICTV building in Kyiv. The beating was denied by some, though press agencies published videos of the mob and photos of Oleg Tsaryov half-naked with bruises. After this beating he stated "I am against a third party interfering in the affairs of Ukraine. Until we learn to listen to each other, Ukraine will stand no chance". At the time opinion polls showed Tsaryov had a rating lower than the sociological error.

Tsaryov withdrew his presidential candidacy on 29 April. He claimed to so because it was dangerous for him to continue his presidential campaign and meet with voters in Kyiv (earlier that month Tsaryov said he had been beaten by pro-Western radical Ukrainian activists in Kyiv). Tsaryov called on "all presidential candidates representing Ukraine's eastern and southeastern regions" (namely) Petro Symonenko, Mykhailo Dobkin, Serhiy Tihipko and Renat Kuzmin to boycott the election; because "An election that is being held while a civil war is unfolding must be boycotted". He added that if they did not withdrew they would be "playing into the hands of the illegitimate authorities and legitimizing not only them but also their decision to start a civil war against the eastern regions". After the elections Tsaryov refused to recognize the election as legitimate; as he claimed "it was a choice only of half of Ukraine".

=== Separatism ===
In May 2014, a recording of a death threat phone call allegedly made to Tsaryov by the governor of Dnipropetrovsk Oblast and owner of PrivatBank, Ihor Kolomoyskyi, began circulating in social media. In the call, Kolomoyskyi told Tsaryov that there was a bounty of $1 million on his head, and to stay in Moscow if he did not want to be killed. Tsaryov said that the call was authentic.

On 3 June 2014 Tsaryov was stripped of his parliamentary immunity by the Verkhovna Rada (Ukraine's parliament) who also sanctioned his arrest. Tsaryov is now wanted for making "public calls to overthrow the existing constitutional system in Ukraine, change its state borders and stage acts of disobedience, which entailed grave consequences and caused many casualties among law enforcers and peaceful civilians".

On 26 June 2014 Tsaryov became Speaker of the "Unity Parliament" of the self-proclaimed confederation of Donetsk People's Republic and Luhansk People's Republic (in eastern Ukraine) Novorossiya.

Russian prosecutors refuse to extradite Tsaryov to Ukraine and (according to Ukraine falsely) state that they have not received such a request from Ukraine.

On 20 May 2015 Tsaryov announced the termination of the Novorossiya confederation. He stated this was done because the confederation did not comply with the Minsk II accords.

In 2018 Ukrainian media suspected that Tsaryov was living in Russia, probably in Russian annexed Crimea.

=== Sanctions ===
On 13 May 2014 Tsaryov was sanctioned by the European Union for calling for the creation of Federal State of Novorossiya.

He was sanctioned by the UK government in 2014 in relation to the Russo-Ukrainian War.

=== Russian invasion of Ukraine ===
On 24 February 2022, Russian President Vladimir Putin announced that Russia was conducting a "special military operation in Donbas"; this announcement was followed by a large scale invasion of Ukraine. The United States intelligence community named Tsaryov as a possible Kremlin supported choice to lead a pro-Russian puppet Ukrainian government. (Note: In January 2022, the British government named Yevheniy Murayev as a possible Kremlin supported choice to lead a pro-Russian puppet Ukrainian government and, in January 2022, the United States intelligence community named Viktor Medvedchuk as another possible Kremlin supported choice to lead a pro-Russian puppet Ukrainian government.) On the (first) morning of the invasion Tsaryov declared "as promised, the denazification operation has begun." He also claimed he was "already in Ukraine" and that "Kyiv will be liberated from the Nazis."

On 15 March 2022, Russian channel RT released an interview with Tsaryov in which he claimed he was in Ukraine and providing humanitarian aid to Ukrainian territory under control of Russian troops.

On 20 March 2022, Tsaryov called on the acting mayor of Kryvyi Rih, Oleksandr Vilkul (while claiming "his" Russian troops "are now near Kryvyi Rih") to surrender the city to Russian troops. Tsaryov addressed Vilkul as "used to be my fellow party members" and claimed that Vilkul had "always taken a pro-Russian stance". On Facebook Vilkul answered Tsaryov: "Fuck you, traitor, along with your masters!".

On 24 March 2022, Tsaryov announced Russia's decision to "create military-civilian administrations in the occupied territories, which will assume all the power of authority" and added that "this [Ukraine] has always been and will be Russian land and we are restoring sovereignty over this land."

On 2 April 2022 Russian forces gave up its attempts to gain control over Kyiv, and thus the possibility for creating a puppet Ukrainian government, when it abandoned its Kyiv offensive.

After the visit of Boris Johnson to Kyiv on April 10, Tsaryov suggested shooting down airplanes with foreign politicians.

On 14 October 2025, President Volodymyr Zelenskyy issued a decree stripping Tsaryov of Ukrainian citizenship.

=== Assassination attempt ===
Tsaryov was allegedly shot in annexed Crimea on the night of 26–27 October 2023. Vladimir Rogov, a pro-Russian politician in occupied Ukraine, claimed a day later that Tsaryov was transferred to a hospital in a "very serious" condition.

A message on Tsaryov's Telegram channel on 7 November 2023 indicated that he was not killed. Later that month, Tsaryov appeared on live television broadcasts on Russia-24, proving that he was still alive.

== Family life ==
Tsaryov is married to Larissa (born in 1968) and has a daughter (born in 1999) and son (born in 1995), who both study in the United Kingdom. He has another daughter, born in 2003.

In December 2022 Tsaryov's brother Mykhailo was convicted for "terrorism" after being accused of preparing a series of explosions at strategically important objects in Dnipropetrovsk Oblast for an alleged promise to appoint him Governor of Dnipropetrovsk Oblast if the province would be occupied by Russia.

== Political views ==
In his election program for the 2012 Ukrainian parliamentary election Tsaryov wrote: "I marched in the miners' columns in Kyiv in 2004 against the "orange" disorder. I fought against fascists and nationalists of all stripes. I have always advocated Ukraine's non-aligned status, I am opposed to joining NATO. I stand for friendship with Russia, the Russian language and our great history - the story of Zhukov and Gagarin…" In March 2022 Tsaryov claimed that "this [Ukraine] has always been and will be Russian land and we are restoring sovereignty over this land."

As a People's Deputy of Ukraine of the Party of Regions Tsaryov was known as one of the party's members opposing closer relations between Ukraine and the European Union.

In November 2013 Tsariov demanded a criminal investigation into the activities of United States Department of State lead TechCamp in Ukraine because he believed it was engaged in "preparations for inciting a civil war" because during training "instructors share their experience of Internet technologies, which are aimed at shaping public opinion and enhancing the protest potential and which were used to organize street protests in Libya, Egypt, Tunisia and Syria".

Tsaryov was one of the most ardent supporters a violent dispersal of the (2013–2014) Euromaidan. He called these protesters "terrorists, bandits and extremists." On 9 December 2013 Tsaryov requested to the Security Service and Foreign Ministry of Ukraine to deport or/and ban foreign organizers and political consultants of the Euromaidan protests, document scans of which he posted (and later removed) on his Facebook account. Among those named in the document notably included Andreas Umland, Stanislav Belkovsky, Taras Kuzio, Gleb Pavlovsky, and former Georgian president Mikheil Saakashvili, among others. Tsaryov was pleased with the so-called anti-protest laws adopted in January 2014, stating that it was good that these laws made non-governmental organizations that accept foreign funds register as "foreign agents" because such funds only benefited the United States.
