= Opinion polling for the 2014 Ukrainian presidential election =

This page lists public opinion polls for the 2014 Ukrainian presidential election.

== First round ==
Poll results are listed in the table below in reverse chronological order, showing the most recent first. The highest percentage figure in each polling survey is displayed in bold, and the background is shaded in the two leading candidates respective colours. In the instance that there is a tie, then no figure is bolded. If no candidate obtains an absolute majority in the first round, then the two highest polling candidates will contest a run-off second ballot. The lead column on the right shows the percentage-point difference between the two candidates with the highest figures. Poll results use the date the survey's fieldwork was done, as opposed to the date of publication. However, if such a date is unknown, the date of publication will be given instead.

Date	Polling firm	Tihipko Ind.	Dobkin PoR	Klitschko UDAR	Tymoshenko FA	Tyahnybok Svoboda	Symonenko CPU	Poroshenko Ind.	Liashko Rad.	Others	Lead
13–19 May	Ukrainian National Academy of Pedagogic Sciences (Note: This survey shows its poll results without disregarding those who are undecided or said they will abstain from voting (either physically or by voting blank). In order to obtain results comparable to other surveys and the official election results, the result shown in this table will be that obtained, with a simple rule of three, from disregarding undecided and/or abstaining voters from the totals offered in the survey.)	8.0	–	–	**13.3**	–	–	**45.0**	7.6	6.7	31.7
6–8 May	GfK	**10.6**	4.6	–	10.4	1.5	3.2	**47.9**	6.4	20.4	37.3
25–29 Apr	Razumkov Centre	6.7	4.2	–	**14.8**	1.9	4.5	**47.7**	5.0	15.2	33.9
Oleg Tsarov officially withdraws
9–16 Apr	SOCIS, KIIS, RATING, Razumkov Centre	7.4	6.0	–	**14.0**	2.1	5.6	**48.4**	4.6	11.9	34.4
28 Mar – 2 Apr	Razumkov Centre, RATING	8.8	5.2	–	**19.1**	2.3	4.6	**42.3**	5.5	12.2	23.2
Serhiy Tihipko is expelled from the Party of Regions
31 Mar	Advanced Legal Initiatives	**19.6**	1.2	–	12.7	3.6	3.5	**42.0**	2.3	14.9	22.4
Mykhailo Dobkin is selected by Party of Regions as their Presidential nominee, Viktor Yanukovych is officially expelled from the Party of Regions
Vitali Klitschko withdraws in order to run for the mayoralty of Kyiv, and endorses Poroshenko
14–26 Mar	International Republican Institute (Note: Some opinion polls round their data so that in the end up showing a .0 or a .5 value. This practise is maintained for these polls when disregarding undecided and/or abstaining voters from the totals so as to avoid different interpretations of the same value.)	7.0	3.0	13.0	**14.0**	3.0	4.0	**27.0**	–	18.0	13.0
14–19 Mar	SOCIS, KIIS, RATING, Razumkov Centre	10.0	5.3	**12.9**	12.0	2.5	5.0	**36.2**	5.0	11.1	23.3
4–18 Mar	GfK	8.5	5.0	**19.0**	12.0	1.5	7.0	**39.5**	–	7.9	20.5
Viktor Yanukovych officially withdraws
1–6 Mar	Social Monitoring Centre	11.4	–	**14.2**	**15.5**	3.7	6.4	13.7	3	–	1.3
25 Feb – 4 Mar	SOCIS	9.6	–	**21.3**	14.1	3.6	6.4	**30.9**	–	14.3	9.6
28 Feb – 3 Mar	KIIS	13.3	–	**20.1**	13.9	2.8	8.3	**32.8**	–	8.8	12.7
28 Feb – 3 Mar	KIIS	–	6.3	**20.5**	15.4	3.9	9.5	**35.9**	–	8.8	15.4

=== Before the Yanukovych ouster and Crimean crisis ===
Date	Polling firm	Yanukovych PoR	Klitschko UDAR	Tymoshenko FA	Tyahnybok Svoboda	Symonenko CPU	Poroshenko Ind.	Others	Lead
24 Jan – 1 Feb	SOCIS	29.2	**22.8**	19.1	2.8	4.3	15.9	6.0	6.4
17–26 Jan	SOCIS	29.5	**21.6**	20.8	4.7	5.7	13.0	4.6	7.9
Before 2014
23–27 Dec 2013	R&B Group	36.0	**19.9**	11.2	5.7	5.4	11.0	10.7	16.1
7–17 Dec 2013	RATING	28.2	22.7	**23.2**	5.5	6.3	8.0	6.1	5.0
26 Oct – 8 Nov 2013	IFES	31.0	**30.0**	17.0	6.0	9.0	–	7.0	1.0
30 Sep – 8 Oct 2013	Razumkov Centre	26.3	**20.9**	18.1	5.1	7.7	4.1	17.8	5.4
26 Sep – 6 Oct 2013	RATING	28.0	**25.0**	22.0	8.0	8.0	2.0	6.0	3.0
15–25 Sep 2013	R&B Group	32.5	**18.3**	17.0	4.8	7.7	5.0	14.7	14.2
21–30 May 2013	KIIS	27.2	**30.2**	–	11.0	7.0	–	24.6	3.0
21–24 Dec 2012	Razumkov Centre	32.6	16.6	**18.6**	7.4	8.8	–	16.0	14.0
2012
17 Jan 2010	2010 election results	35.3	–	25.1	1.4	3.5	–	21.6	10.2
