= Konovalchuk =

Konovalchuk or Konowalchuk is a Ukrainian-language surname derived from the occupation of konoval [ коновал ], an archaic term for "veterinarian", literally meaning "descendant of konoval". Notable people with this surname include:

- Volodymyr Konovalchuk, Ukrainian footballer
- Steve Konowalchuk, American ice hockey player

== See also ==
- Konovalenko
- Konovalov, Russian surname with the same derivation
- Konovalyuk
