= Konovalenko (disambiguation) =

Konovalenko may refer to:

- Konovalenko (surname)
- Minor planet 18121 Konovalenko
- Konovalenko Sports Palace, indoor sporting arena in Nizhny Novgorod, Russia
