= Konovalov =

Konovalov (Russian: Конова́лов, IPA: [kənɐˈvaləf]), or Konovalova (feminine; Russian: Конова́лова, IPA: [kənɐˈvaləvə]), is a Russian-language surname derived from the occupation of konoval [ коновал ], an archaic term for "veterinarian".

Notable people with this surname include:

== Konovalov ==
- Aleksandr Konovalov (politician) (1875–1948), Russian politician and entrepreneur, former Russian Minister of Trade and Industry (1917)
- Aleksandr Konovalov (judge) (born 1968), Russian politician and lawyer, judge of the Constitutional Court since 2025, former Russian Minister of Justice (2008-2020)
- Andrei Konovalov (born 1974), Russian footballer
- Dmitri Konovalov (1856–1929), Soviet physical chemist
- Ilya Konovalov (born 1971), Russian hammer thrower
- Ilya Konovalov (born 1998), Russian hockey player
- Nikita Konovalov (born 1988), Russian swimmer
- Pavel Konovalov (sprinter) (born 1960), Soviet sprinter
- Pavel Konovalov (canoeist) (born 1967), Russian canoeist
- Serge Konovalov (1941–2003), an archbishop of Western Europe of the Ecumenical Patriarchate of the Eastern Orthodox church (1981-2003)
- Serhiy Konovalov (born 1972), Ukrainian footballer
- Valentin Konovalov (born 1987), Russian politician and head of Khakassia
- Vitaliy Konovalov (1932–2013), Soviet engineer and politician
- Vladimir Konovalov (1911–1967), Soviet Navy submarine commander

== Konovalova ==
- Galina Konovalova (1916–2014), Russian actress
- Liliya Konovalova (1933–2015), Soviet volleyball player
- Lyudmila Konovalova (born 1968), Russian basketball player
- Mariya Konovalova (born 1974), Russian long-distance runner
- Svetlana Konovalova (born 1990), Russian paralympic cross-country skier

== See also ==
- Konovalenko
- Konovalyuk
- Konovalchuk
- Konoval
