= Oleh Liashko =

Ukrainian politician (born 1972)

- Олег Ляшко
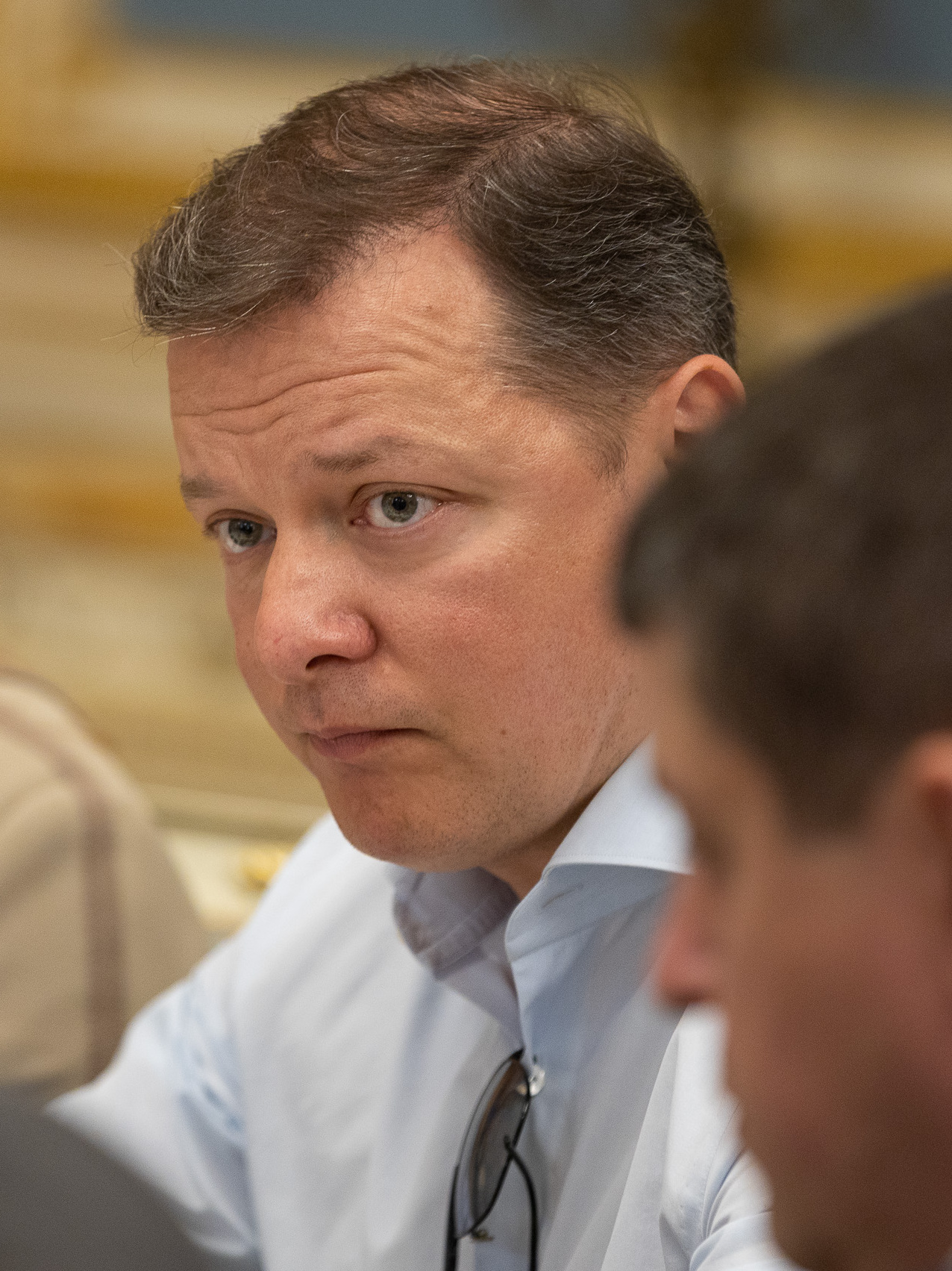
- Liashko in 2019

People's Deputy of Ukraine
- In office 26 March 2006 – 29 August 2019

Chairman of the Radical Party
- Incumbent
- Assumed office 8 August 2011

Personal details
- Born: Oleh Valeriiovych Liashko; 3 December 1972 (age 53) Chernihiv, Ukrainian SSR, Soviet Union
- Party: Radical Party (2012–present)
- Other political affiliations: Batkivshchyna (before 2012)
- Spouse: Rosita Sairanen (m. 2018)
- Education: Kharkiv National Pedagogical University
- Oleh Liashko's voice Liashko demanding an end to the pressure on Nova Poshta; Recorded 20 March 2018

Oleh Valeriiovych Liashko (Ukrainian: Олег Валерійович Ляшко; born 3 December 1972) is a Ukrainian politician, journalist, and soldier who was a long-time member of the Verkhovna Rada and leader of the Radical Party.

Liashko was elected as a People's Deputy to the Verkhovna Rada in 2006, in the 2007 parliamentary election for the Yulia Tymoshenko Bloc (YTB), in the 2012 parliamentary election and 2014 parliamentary election for his Radical Party. Prior to this, he was a journalist.

In the 2014 Ukrainian presidential election, he received 8.32% of the vote. In the 2019 Ukrainian parliamentary election, Liashko lost his parliamentary seat.

Liashko joined the Ukrainian Armed Forces following the Russian invasion of Ukraine in 2022. In 2024 he was appointed commander of a battalion specializing in unmanned systems.

== Early life ==
Liashko was born in Chernihiv on 3 December 1972, but grew up in the village of Lozovivka in Starobilsk Raion, where his mother lived. When Liashko was two years old, his parents separated, and his mother was forced to send him to an orphanage. Liashko studied in three boarding schools in Yablunivka, Komarivka and Borzna. He worked as a shepherd at the Progress collective farm. After completing his secondary education he went to college to study as a tractor operator. In a September 2015 interview, Liashko stated that shepherding was his summer job back in 1987-88: he used to travel to Luhansk Oblast by train and earn up to 300 roubles per summer (around US$500 at the time). After that Liashko would buy clothing and shoes in Starobilsk. When he graduated from boarding school, Liashko had around 2,000 roubles in savings, the value of which was completely wiped out by post-Soviet inflation.

In 1998 he graduated from the Faculty of Law H.S. Skovoroda Kharkiv National Pedagogical University.

From 1990 till 1992 Liashko was a correspondent and head of the newspaper Young Guard (based in Kyiv). In 1992 he became an editor of Commerce Herald of the Ministry of Foreign Economic Relations of Ukraine.

On 21 June 1993 Liashko was arrested and indicted for grand funds embezzlement. On 9 December 1994, the Criminal College of the Kyiv City Court found Liashko guilty according to articles 86–1, 191, and 194 part 3 of the Criminal Code of Ukraine. The court found Liashko guilty of embezzlement of 1,300,000 roubles personally, and 1,100,000 roubles collectively with accomplices. Liashko was sentenced to six years in prison and sequestration of the property. The Supreme Court reduced the time to four years' imprisonment. Liashko was released in May 1995 under an amnesty agreement due to the "50th anniversary of the Victory over Nazi Germany". In 1998, the criminal case was erased. Liashko himself claims the case was payback for his critical journalism. He claims that his case was falsified by deputy minister of Internal Affairs Veniamin Bartashevych.

== Career ==
=== Reporting career ===
In 1995 and 1996, Liashko was an editor at the newspapers Politika and Pravda Ukraine. In August 1996, he became Chief Editor of the newspaper Politika. In 1999, the publication was closed by decision of the Moscow District Court in Kyiv for "divulging state secrets". From 2000 till 2006, Liashko was chief editor of Freedom (for "Newspaper "Policy").

=== Political career ===
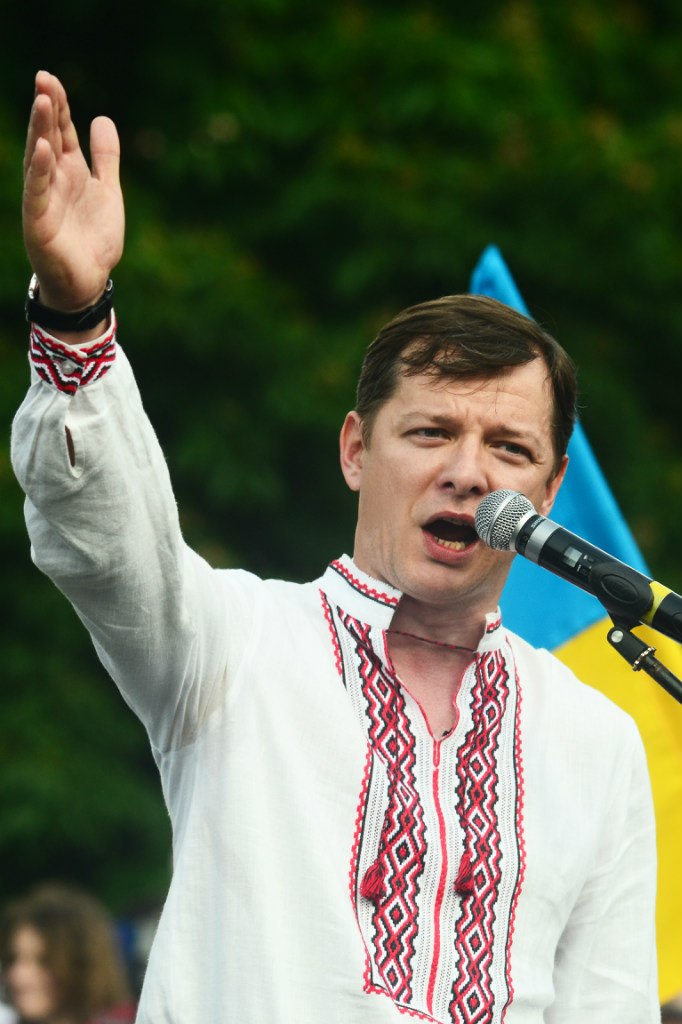
Oleh Liashko in Lviv in 2014

Liashko was elected as a deputy to the Verkhovna Rada (Ukraine's parliament) in the 2006 parliamentary election for the Yulia Tymoshenko Bloc (YBT) (No. 26 in the party list). During this term he served as Chairman of the Subcommittee on the organization of the Supreme Council of the Parliamentary Committee on Rules, Ethics and maintenance of the parliament.

In the 2007 parliamentary election, he was re-elected into the Verkhovna Rada for YBT (No. 29 on the party list). He was Deputy Chairman of the Parliamentary Committee on Budget.

On 18 October 2010, he was expelled from the YBT faction "for cooperating with the majority coalition". YTB had previously stated that a video leaked a week before would not be the reason for excluding of Liashko from the faction.

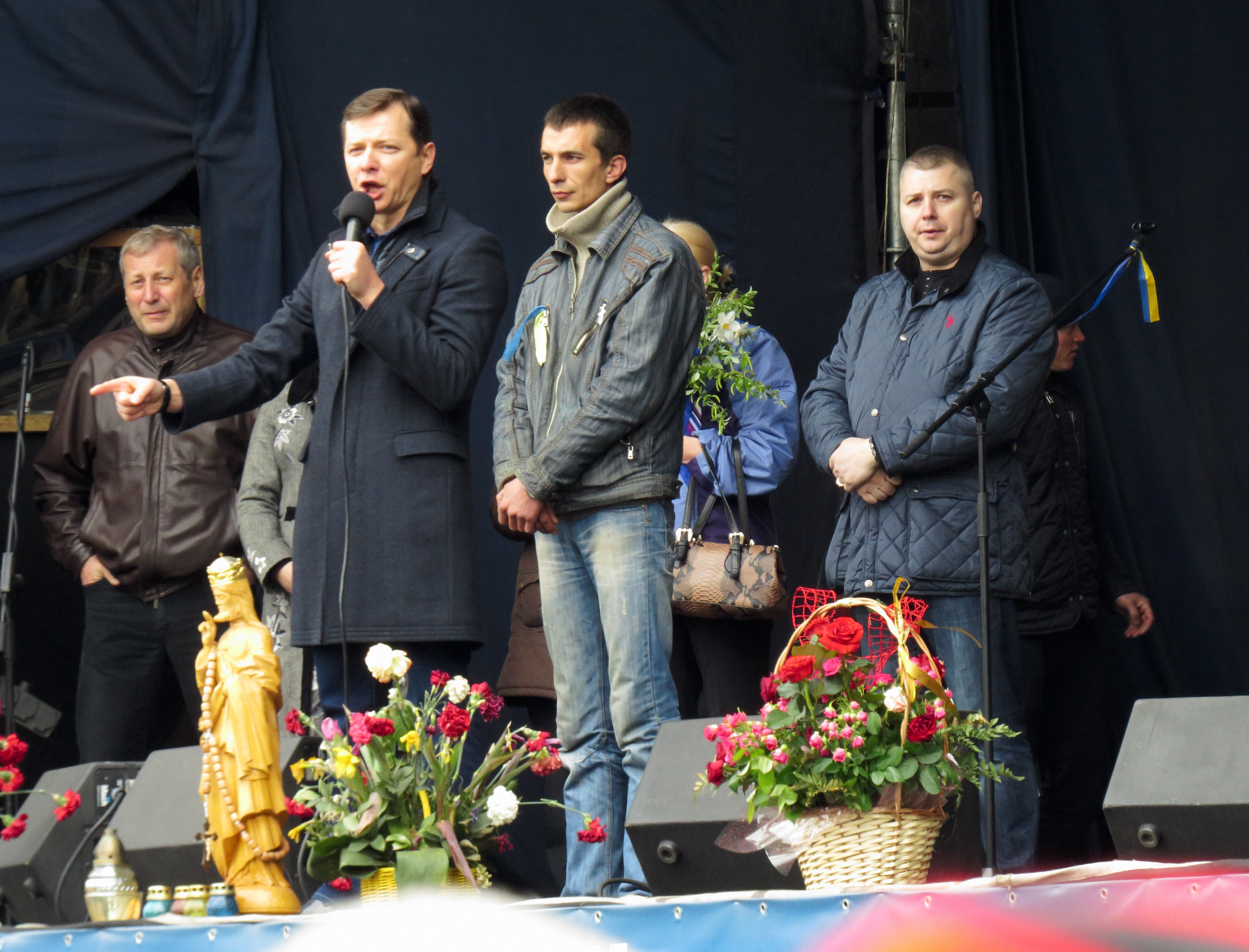
Kyiv, meeting at the Maidan main stage

On 8 August 2011, Liashko was elected the new party leader of the Ukrainian Radical Democratic Party during its third party congress. On the same day, the party changed its name to Radical Party of Oleh Liashko (shortened to the Radical Party).

In the 2012 parliamentary election, he was re-elected to the Verkhovna Rada after winning single-member constituency number 208 in the Chernihiv Oblast (as candidate of the Radical Party) with 55.57% of the votes. During this term he was Deputy Chairman of the Parliamentary Committee on Finance and Banking. He did not join any faction in parliament.

In mid-November 2012, Liashko went on hunger strike in support of jailed fellow opposition leader Yulia Tymoshenko, and against the recognition of the results of the 2012 parliamentary election.

During the Russian annexation of Crimea in 2014, he introduced a bill which classified participants of the "separatist rallies for joining Russia", as well as those who obstruct the movement of soldiers and military equipment, to be saboteurs and accomplices of the occupiers. At the time of "military aggression" the death penalty should be applied to them. The bill provided for the introduction of a visa regime with Russia, denunciation of the agreements made with Russia, the prohibition of the Communist Party of Ukraine and the Party of Regions, called for the EU to ban the entry of Crimean residents with Russian passports and other events. (Note: The status of Crimea and of the city of Sevastopol is currently under dispute between Russia and Ukraine; Ukraine and the majority of the international community consider the Crimea to be an autonomous republic of Ukraine, and Sevastopol to be one of Ukraine's cities with special status, while Russia, on the other hand, considers the Crimea to be a federal subject of Russia, and Sevastopol to be one of Russia's three federal cities.)

During the 2014 pro-Russian conflict in Ukraine and two days before the 25 May 2014 presidential election, Liashko claimed responsibility for the storming of a local government building in Torez (by "Soldiers from the Liashko Battalion 'Ukraine'") that killed a pro-Russian separatist and supporter of the self-proclaimed Donetsk People's Republic while critically wounding another. Human Rights Watch and Amnesty International have condemned the activities of the Liashko Battalion "Ukraine" and Liashko's actions in Eastern Ukraine. Amnesty International, while noting "abuses perpetrated by both sides of the conflict", pointed to Liashko as "one particularly errant MP" who published videos of his actions on his website. According to Liashko, his actions should be seen as citizen's arrests, and he accused Amnesty International of being "obviously biased".

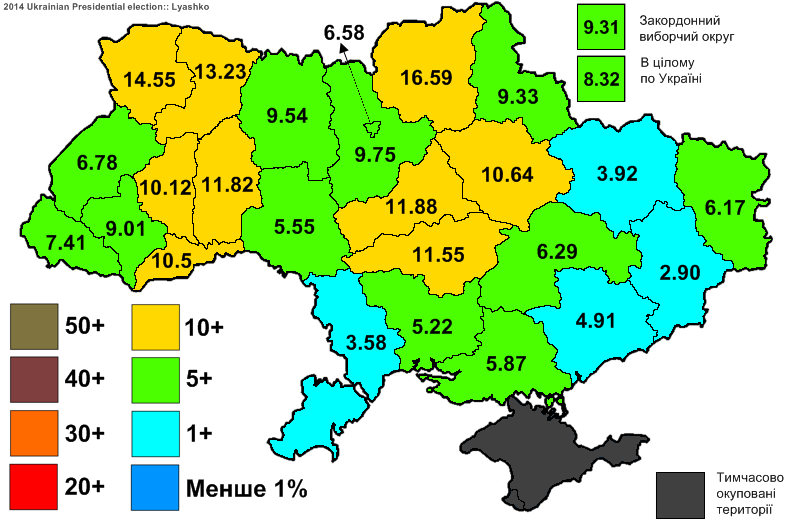
Percentage of the vote obtained by Liashko in the 2014 presidential election by oblast

Liashko was the candidate of the Radical Party in the 2014 Ukrainian presidential election. In the election he received 8.32% of the vote, ranking in 3rd place.

Liashko was elected to the Kyiv City Council, since his party won three seats, and he headed its party list in the 2014 Kyiv local election. However, he decided not to become a deputy in the Kyiv City Council.

In the 2014 Ukrainian parliamentary election, he led his party to win 22 seats.

On 14 November 2016 he was physically attacked by Yuriy Boiko after calling him a "Kremlin agent".

In the 2019 Ukrainian presidential election, Liashko gained 5.48% of the votes, this time ranking in 7th place.

In the 2019 Ukrainian parliamentary election, Liashko lost his parliamentary seat. His party lost all its parliamentary seats because it only gained about 1%, which was too little to clear the 5% election threshold. The party also did not win any electoral district seats.

Liashko unsuccessfully ran for a parliamentary seat (Chernihiv) in the sole additional election to the Verkohvna Rada held on 25 October 2020 at the same time as the country's 2020 local elections. Liashko took 31.78% of the vote, while his closest rival, Anatolii Hunko from Servant of the People won with 34.10%.

=== Military service ===
In early October 2022 Liashko joined the Armed Forces of Ukraine. In 2024 he was appointed commander of a battalion specializing in unmanned systems. On 8 May 2026, Oleh Liashko was appointed commander of the 432nd separate unmanned systems regiment of the 11th Army Corps of the Vostok Command. In 2024 he was appointed commander of a battalion specializing in unmanned systems.

In 2026 he was awarded the Order of Merit, with his battalion being recognized as one of the most effective combat drone units.

== Relationship with Rinat Akhmetov ==
In 2013, Oleh Liashko described Rinat Akhmetov as the guarantor of Ukraine's independence. In 2016, a special investigation conducted by Radio Liberty recorded the facts of secret meetings between Oleh Liashko and Rinat Akhmetov. In February 2018, the former director of a Mariupol factory belonging to the Metinvest group, Yurii Zinchenko headed the executive committee of the Radical Party of Oleh Liashko. On 9 May 2018, the journalist of Ukrayinska Pravda Oleksii Bratushchak published the blog "Liashko becomes Akhmetov's talisman", in which Liashko was directly accused of cooperating with Akhmetov. Liashko makes frequent appearances during broadcasts of the TV channel Ukraine, which belongs to Akhmetov. As media expert Nataliia Lyhachova, Chairman of "Detector Media" NGO stated: "According to our monitoring, there is almost no day when Liashko does not appear there for any reason". Since the outbreak of the Russian invasion of Ukraine, Liashko has been more critical about Akhmetov in his public statements.

== Personal life ==
Liashko's private life is surrounded by rumours that he is gay, something Liashko has always firmly denied. In early October 2010, a video shot in 1993 was leaked onto the internet in which a young man who looks and sounds like Liashko talks about having sexual relations with another man, a certain high-ranking official. The day after the video was leaked he issued a statement accusing political opponents of doctoring the video using "modern technologies". And he stated "Personally, I have a traditional sexual orientation". In an interview in October 2012, Liashko was told by a spoof interviewer that the reporter's friend believed Liashko represented sexual minorities in parliament. Liashko was handed a mobile phone, spoke to the supposed friend and then promised to beat his face in while being filmed on camera. Liashko had stressed in May 2011 he had nothing against sexual minorities. In an interview in September 2015, he stated that being LGBT "is the choice of each individual. I cannot condemn".

=== Family ===
In June 2018, Liashko married Rosita Sairanen, formalizing a 20-year partnership. The couple have one daughter, Vladyslava.
