= 2014 Ukrainian presidential election =

Election of Petro Poroshenko

- 25 May 2014
- Turnout: 59.88% (▼8.93pp)
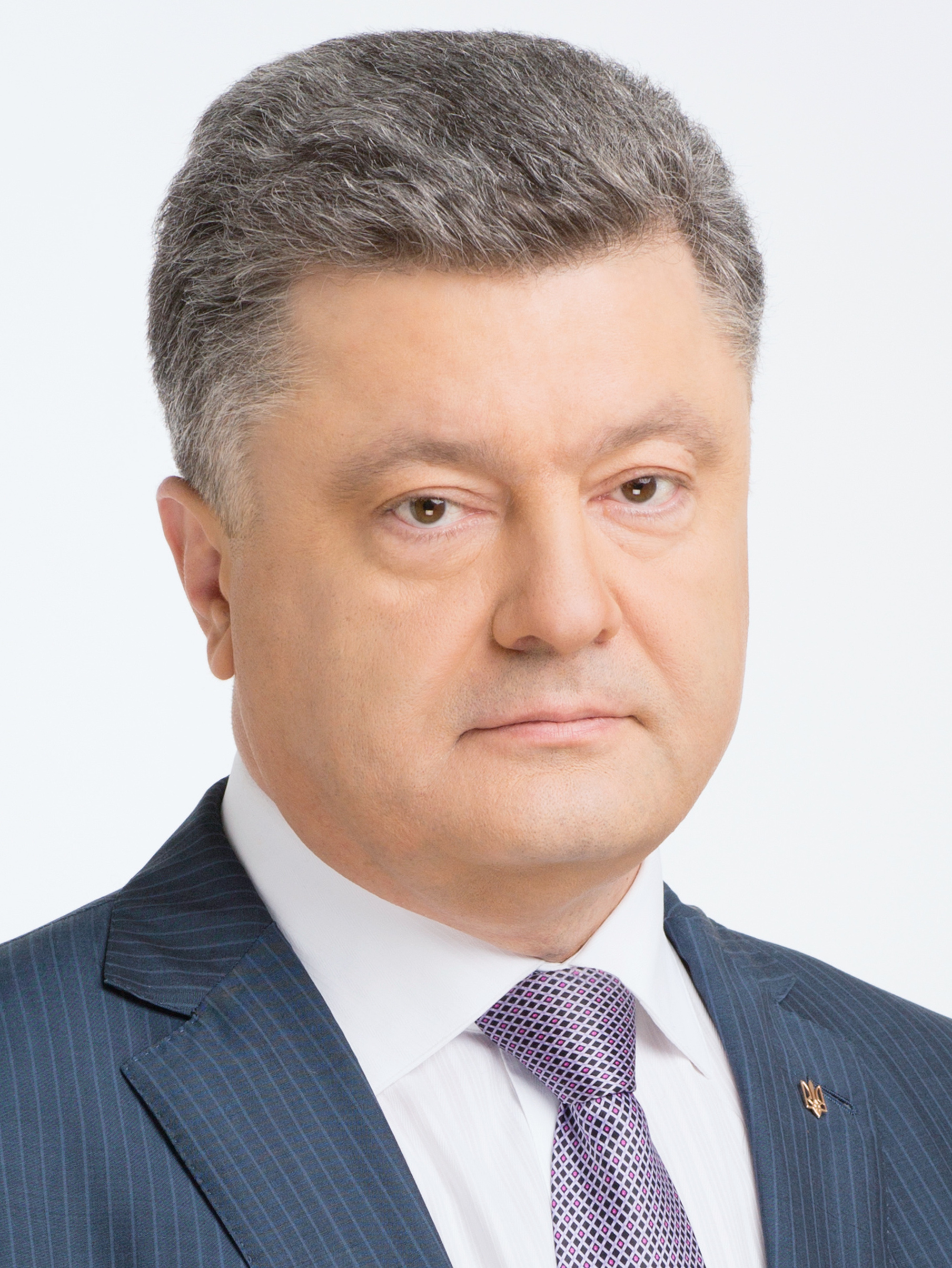

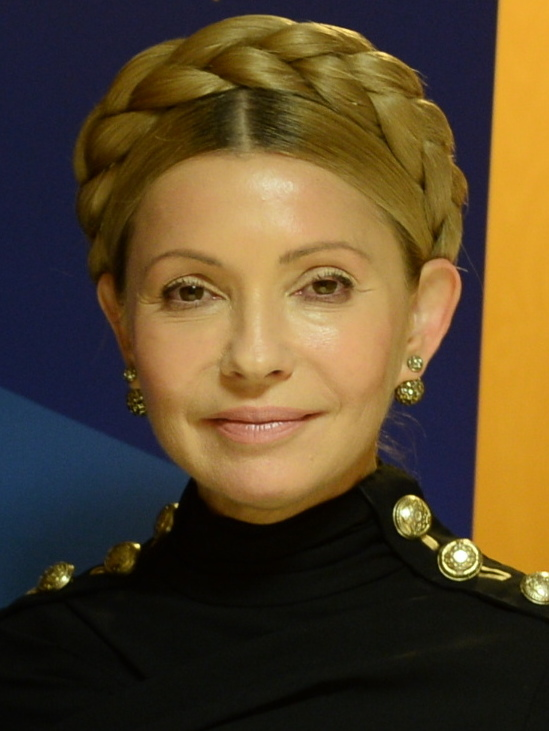

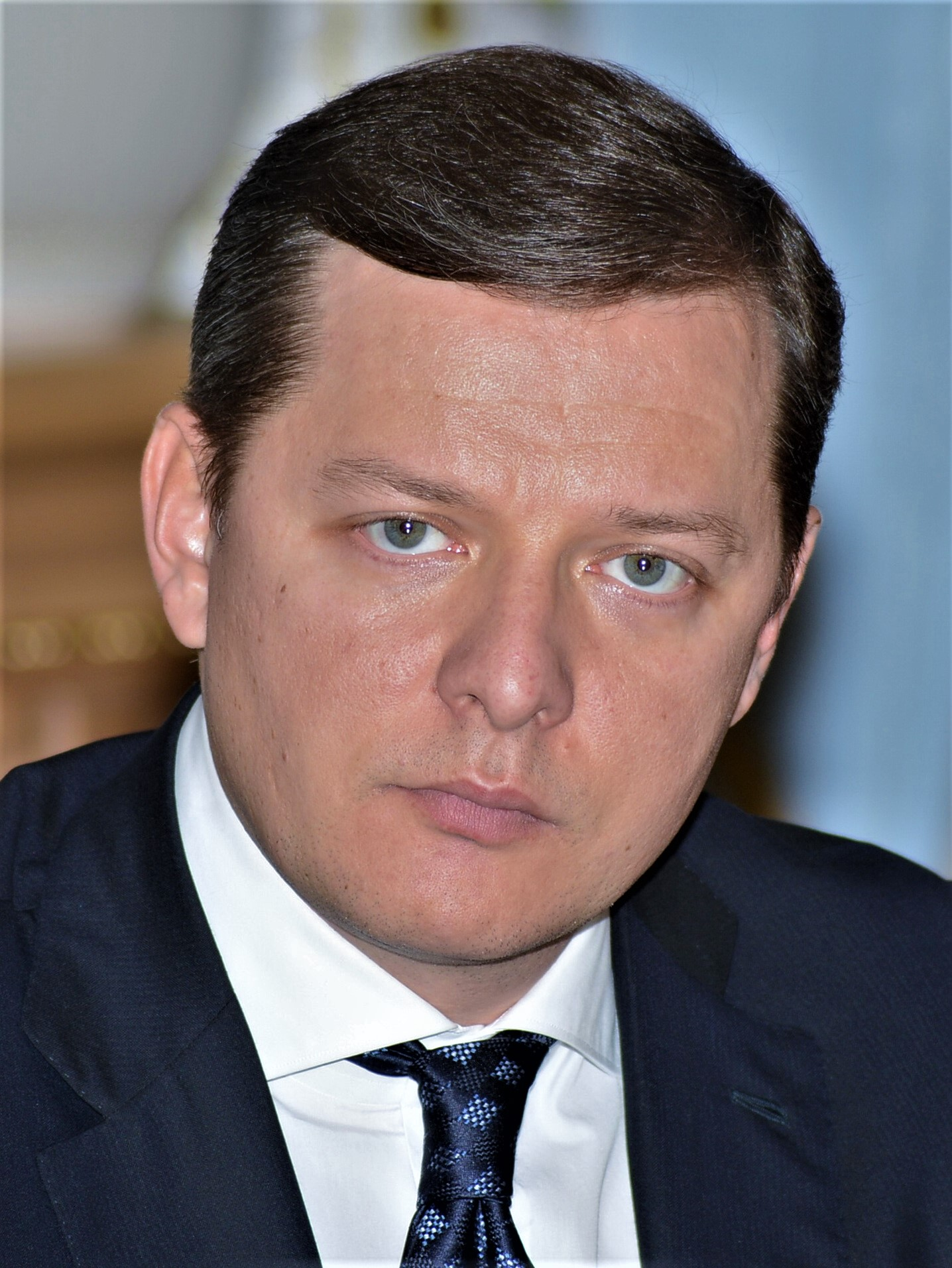

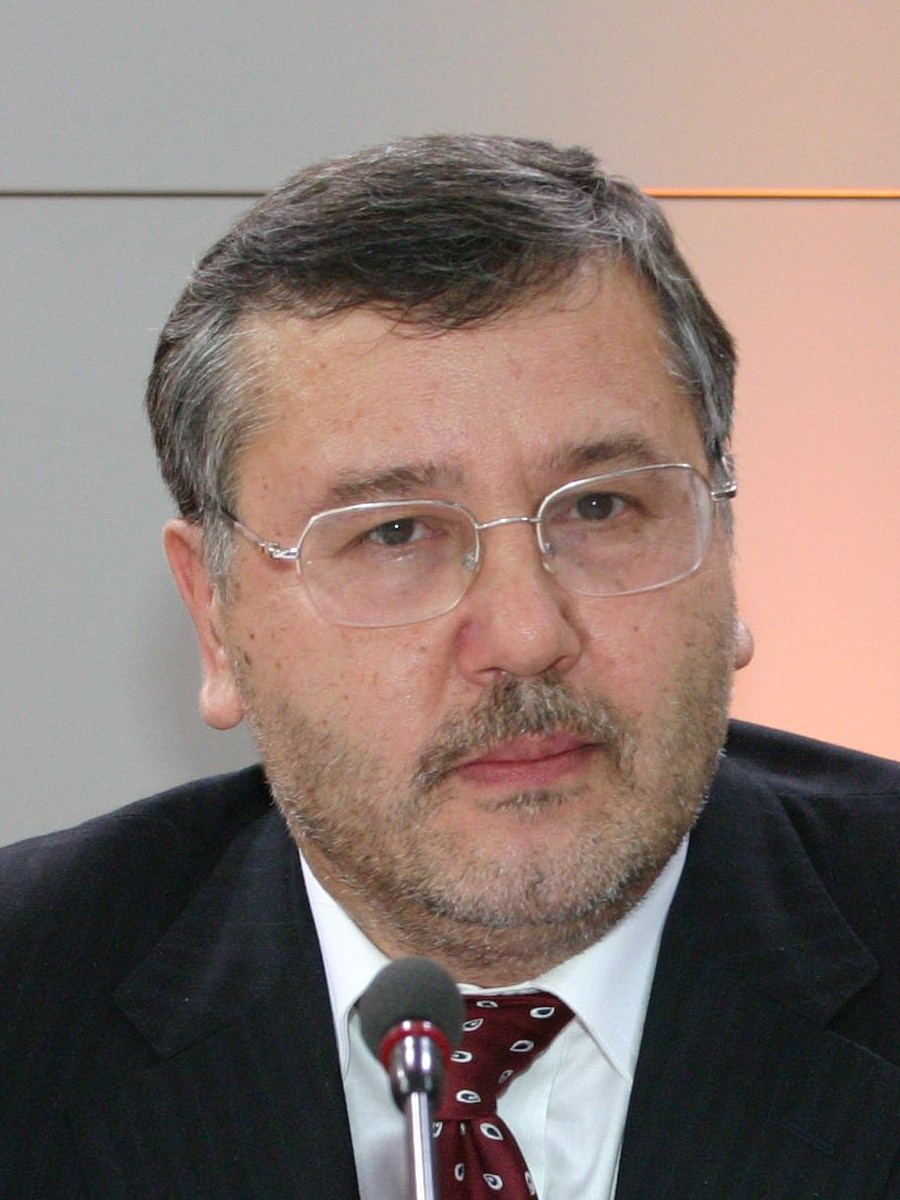

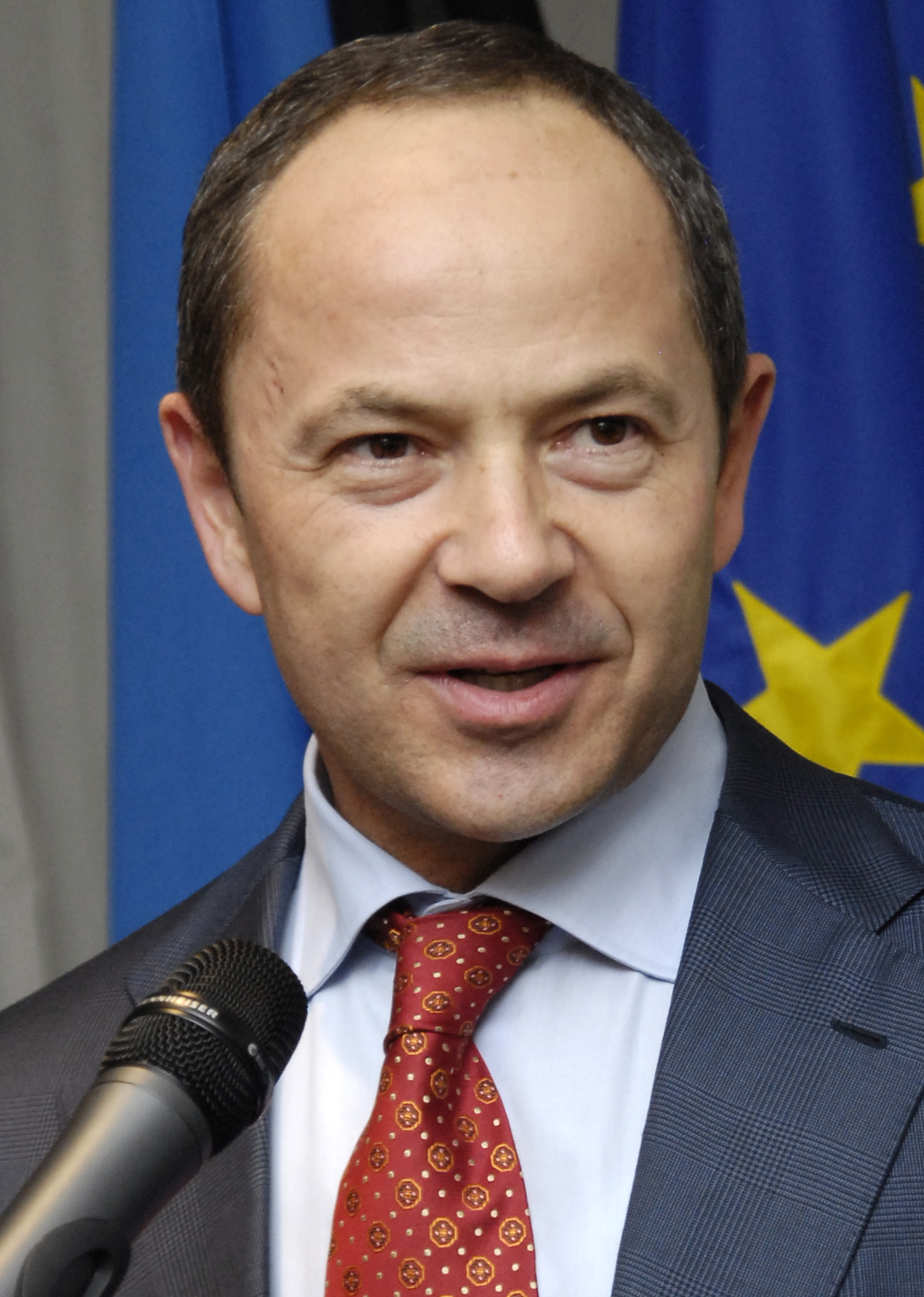
| Nominee | Petro Poroshenko | Yulia Tymoshenko | Oleh Liashko |
| Party | Independent | Batkivshchyna | Radical Party |
| Alliance | UDAR |
| Popular vote | 9,857,308 | 2,310,085 | 1,500,377 |
| Percentage | 55.46% | 13.00% | 8.44% |
| Nominee | Anatoliy Hrytsenko | Serhiy Tihipko |
| Party | Civil Position | Independent |
| Alliance | | Strong Ukraine |
| Popular vote | 989,029 | 943,430 |
| Percentage | 5.56% | 5.31% |
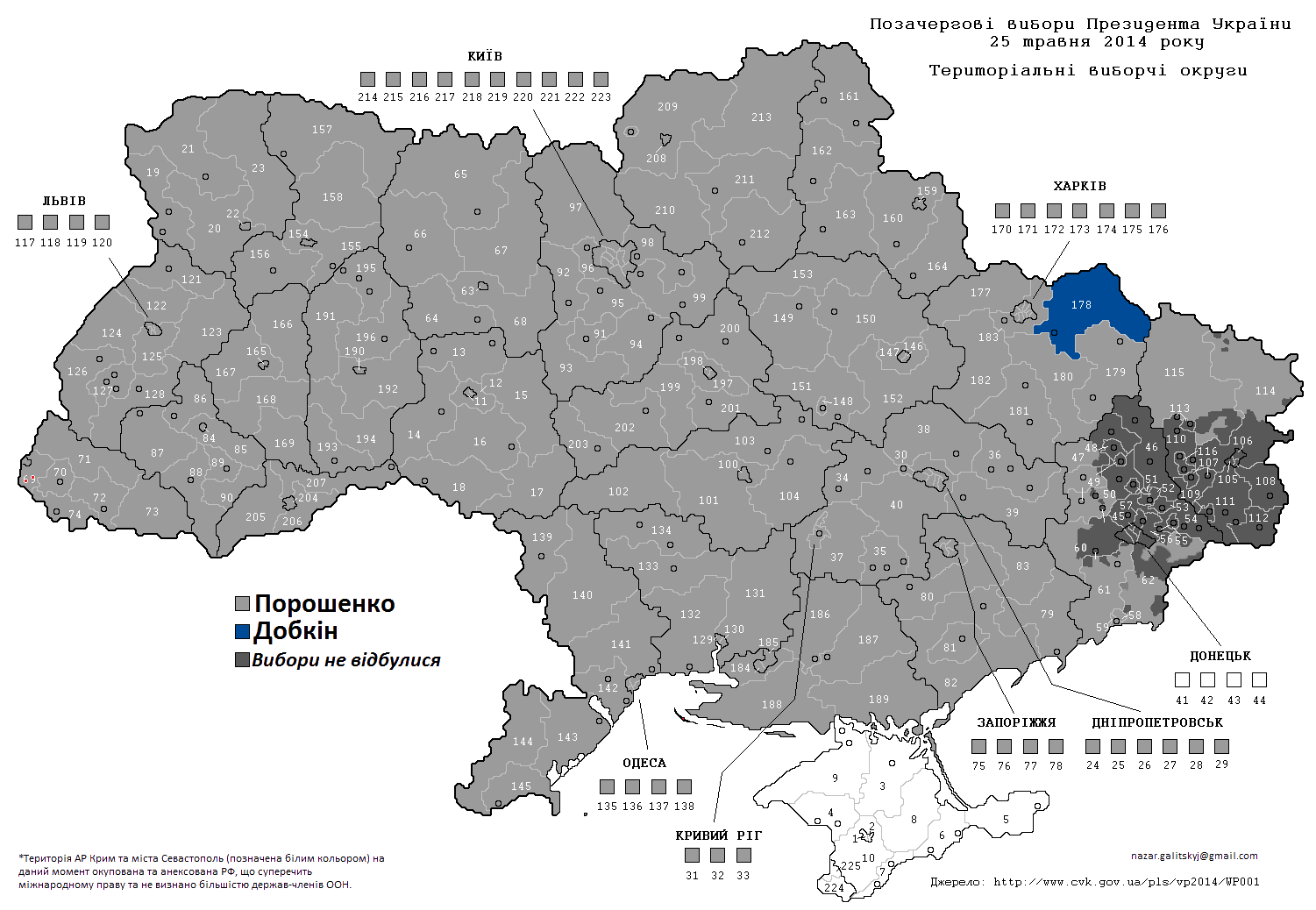
President before election
Oleksandr Turchynov (acting)
Batkivshchyna
Elected President
Petro Poroshenko
Independent

Snap presidential elections were held in Ukraine on 25 May 2014 and resulted in Petro Poroshenko being elected President of Ukraine. Originally scheduled to take place on 29 March 2015, the date was brought forward following the 2014 Ukrainian revolution. Poroshenko won the elections with 55% of the vote, enough to win in a single round. His closest competitor, Yulia Tymoshenko, received 13% of the vote. The Central Election Commission reported voter turnout over 60%, excluding the regions not under government control. Since Poroshenko obtained an absolute majority in the first round, a run-off second ballot (scheduled for 15 June 2014) was unnecessary.

The election was not held everywhere in Ukraine. During the 2014 Crimean crisis, Ukraine lost control over Crimea, which was unilaterally annexed by Russia in March 2014. (Note: The status of the Crimea and of the city of Sevastopol is currently under dispute between Russia and Ukraine; Ukraine and the majority of the international community consider the Crimea to be an autonomous republic of Ukraine and Sevastopol to be one of Ukraine's cities with special status, while Russia, on the other hand, considers the Crimea to be a federal subject of Russia and Sevastopol to be one of Russia's three federal cities.) As a result, elections were not held in Crimea. Of the 2,430 planned ballot stations (in Donbas), only 426 opened for polling. The self-proclaimed Donetsk People's Republic and Luhansk People's Republic, controlling large parts of Donbas, had vowed to do everything possible to disrupt the elections on their territory.

Petro Poroshenko won the presidency and served a full presidential term until 2019, losing to Volodymyr Zelenskyy.

== Background ==
=== Prior to the rescheduling of the election ===
Initially the elections were scheduled for 29 March 2015.

On 7 December 2012 Batkivshchyna nominated Yulia Tymoshenko as its presidential candidate. On 14 June 2013, the congress of her party approved the decision to nominate her as its candidate for the presidential election. On 11 October 2011, a Ukrainian court found Tymoshenko guilty of abuse of power, sentenced her to seven years in jail and banned her from seeking elected office for her period of imprisonment. Because Tymoshenko was in prison during the 2012 Ukrainian parliamentary election, Arseniy Yatsenyuk headed the election list of Batkivshchyna. Tymoshenko remained in prison until 22 February 2014, after parliament voted for her release and removal of her criminal record, allowing her to compete for elected office once again.

In May 2013 Batkivshchyna, UDAR, and Svoboda vowed to coordinate their actions during the presidential campaign, and promised "to support the candidate from among these parties who wins a place in the run-off election". If the election format were to change to a single round, the three parties vowed to agree on a single candidate.

On 24 October 2013, the leader of UDAR, Vitali Klitschko, announced he intended to take part in the election. Experts and lawyers argued that it is unclear if Klitschko could take part. Under Ukrainian law a presidential candidate must have had his residence in Ukraine for the past ten years prior to election day. Klitschko has lived for many years in both Ukraine and Germany, where, according to media reports, he has a residence permit. Klitschko confirmed on 28 February 2014 that he would take part in the 2014 Ukrainian presidential election. However, on 29 March, he withdrew from the race for the presidency, simultaneously pledging his support for Petro Poroshenko.

Former president Viktor Yanukovych, prior to his dismissal and subsequent flight from the country (see below), was considered likely to run for his second and final term. (Note: Per Chapter V, Article 103 of the Constitution, the president is allowed to serve a maximum of two full 5-year terms. However, in 2003, the Constitutional Court of Ukraine permitted then-President Leonid Kuchma to run for a third term in the 2004 presidential election He chose not to run.) (Note: Yanukovych ran in the 2010 Ukrainian presidential election as a candidate of Party of Regions but suspended his membership in the Party of Regions after the election.) But, as of 19 December 2013, he had made no final decision on this. On 19 December 2013, Yanukovych alluded to not participating when he stated "If, theoretically speaking, my rating is low and has no prospects, I won't hinder the country's development and movement ahead".

=== Early 2014 elections ===
==== Scheduling ====
On 21 November 2013, the Ukrainian Second Azarov Government suspended preparations for signing an association agreement with the European Union. The decision to postpone the signing of the association agreement led to massive protests across Ukraine. These led to the removal of President Viktor Yanukovych and his government by the parliament in February, as part of the 2014 Ukrainian revolution, during which Yanukovych fled the country to Russia. On 22 February 2014, the Verkhovna Rada voted 328–0 to dismiss Yanukovych as president. Oleksandr Turchynov, deputy chairman of Batkivshchyna, who had been appointed as Chairman of the Verkhovna Rada earlier that day, was named acting prime minister, and, due to Yanukovych's deposition, acting president, until new elections could be held.

In a press conference in the Russian city of Rostov-on-Don on 28 February, Yanukovych stated that he would not take part in the elections, stating that "I believe they are unlawful, and I will not take part in them". It was later speculated that Serhiy Tihipko would be the presidential candidate of the Party of Regions, Yanukovych's former party. The party's nomination went to Mykhailo Dobkin, however, and Tihipko entered the elections as an independent candidate. Dobkin was amongst the persons wanted by the (then new) Yatsenyuk Government to be sent for trial at the International Criminal Court.

During the 2014 Crimean crisis and Russian military intervention, Ukraine lost control over the Crimea, which was unilaterally annexed by Russia in March 2014. As a result, elections were not held in the Crimea, but Ukrainians who had kept their Ukrainian citizenship were allowed to vote elsewhere in Ukraine.

==== Escalation of pro-Russian unrest ====
In the Donbas region of the Eastern Ukraine, pro-Russian protests escalated into an armed separatist insurgency early in April 2014, when masked gunmen took control of several of the region's government buildings and towns.

On 15 April 2014, Ukrainian media reported that the General Prosecutor of Ukraine had launched criminal proceedings against then-candidate Oleg Tsaryov for allegedly aiding separatists and thus violating Ukraine's territorial integrity. Tsarov withdrew his candidacy on 29 April.

Serhiy Taruta, governor of Donetsk, has suggested a referendum, to be held on 15 June, at the same time as the potential second round of the election. The referendum would address the decentralization of political power, potentially giving regions a greater say in their own affairs, such as greater control over the taxes they levy and the power to make Russian a second official language.

On 16 May 2014, the Constitutional Court of Ukraine ruled that the candidate elected as a result of the presidential election would serve a full five-year term of office.

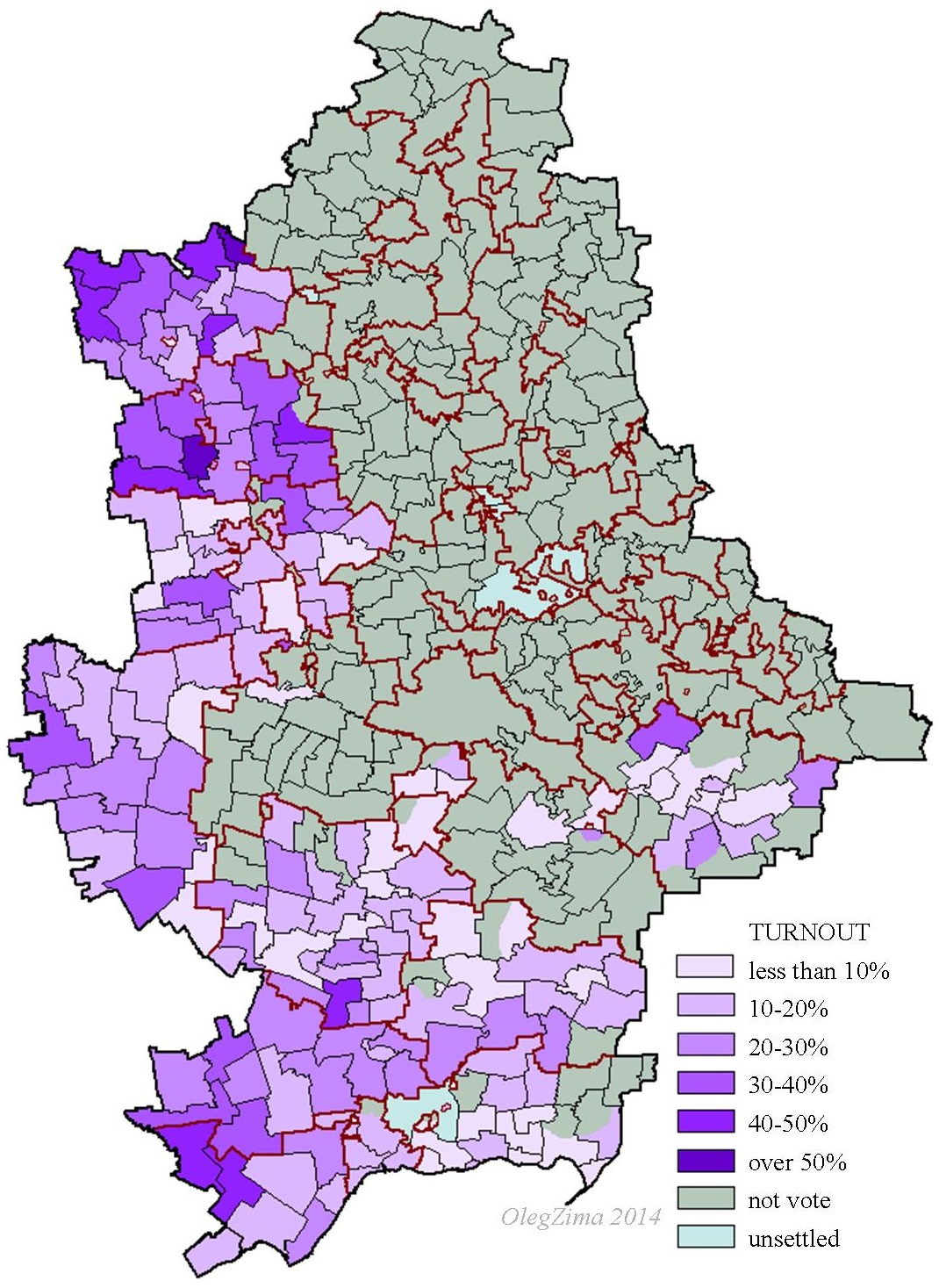
Voter turnout in Donetsk Oblast in the election

On 17 May 2014, the Central Election Commission of Ukraine (CEC) stated that, due to "illegal actions of unknown people", it could not arrange for the "preparation and conduct of elections" in six constituencies in the Donetsk and Luhansk Oblasts. According to the CEC, members of district election commissions there had received threats to their own personal safety and to that of their families. The CEC warned that two million people in the two oblasts (provinces), about 5.6% of Ukraine's approximately 36 million eligible voters, could be deprived of their right to vote if the situation there did not improve. (Note: Donetsk Oblast houses 3.3 million eligible voters (9.3% of Ukraine's total eligible electorate); Luhansk Oblast houses 1.8 million (5% of the total). In Crimea (1.8 million eligible voters, comprising 5.1% of Ukraine's total eligible electorate), there was no voting, due to its annexation by Russia.) (Note: 25.5 million Ukrainians voted in the second round of the 2010 presidential election.) On 22 May, the work of eighteen of the thirty-four election commissions in Donetsk (Note: In western Donetsk, where paramilitary groups helped to suppress separatist activity, the vote went ahead as normal.) and Luhansk Oblasts had been stopped fully or partially by representatives of the self-proclaimed Donetsk People's Republic and Luhansk People's Republic. By 23 May, this number had increased to twenty of the thirty-four. The Committee of Voters of Ukraine predicted on 23 May that, due to "ongoing acts of terrorism and armed insurgency", 10% of the Ukrainian population would be unable to vote. (Note: According to the Committee of Voters of Ukraine, "most of the election committees are now meeting underground, and there have been a lot of kidnappings and threats".) On the same day, the leader of the Luhansk People's Republic advised citizens not to go to the polls to vote, warning of possible provocative "explosions" set by Ukrainian military.

=== Simultaneous elections ===
==== Local elections ====
On 25 May 2014, 27 mayoral elections were also held, including those in Odesa and 2014 Kyiv local election.

==== A by-election to Verkhovna rada ====
A parliamentary by-election was also held in single-member constituency No. 83, centred on Ivano-Frankivsk, following the resignation of MP Oleksandr Sych after his appointment as Vice Prime Minister of Ukraine.

=== Russian reaction ===
Initially Russia opposed rescheduling the election because the Russian government considered the removal of then President Viktor Yanukovych illegal and his temporary successors an "illegitimate junta". But on 7 May 2014 Russian president Vladimir Putin stated the election would be a step "in the right direction" but that the vote would decide nothing unless the rights of "all citizens" were protected. At the St. Petersburg International Economic Forum on 23 May 2014, Putin appeared to further move away from Russia's initial position by announcing that Russia would respect the outcome of the elections in Ukraine and was ready to work with whoever won the presidency.

The US and European Union vowed early May 2014 that they would impose further sanctions against Russia (sanctions have been in place against Russia since its annexation of Crimea) if it disrupted the election. However, unlike previous sanctions which were limited to individuals and companies, the third stage is set to target entire sectors of the Russian economy. Earlier the US and the EU had accused Russia of destabilising Ukraine by stoking the 2014 pro-Russian rebellion in Eastern Ukraine, a charge Russia has denied.

== Electoral system ==
The term of office for the Ukrainian president is five years. If no candidate had obtained an absolute majority in the first round, then the two highest polling candidates would have contested a run-off second ballot on 15 June 2014.

=== Information technology framework for electoral monitoring – Elections 2014 ===
Arsen Avakov underlined the importance of Elections 2014 a new IT elections monitoring system ("Ukrainian: Вибори 2014") that allowed voters to track the progress of the elections in real time, potentially increasing transparency, and avoiding the post-election disturbances seen in prior Ukrainian elections. On 22 May 2014, three days before the election, hacker group CyberBerkut announced that it had compromised the primary servers of the Central Election Commission and stolen passwords from the servers. As well, the Security Service of Ukraine investigated the servers and discovered malware that would have destroyed election results. On election day, authorities arrested a group of hackers with specialized equipment in Kyiv. They had been attempting to rig the election.

== Candidates ==
21 candidates took part in the elections; seven of them had been nominated by political parties, 15 were self-nominees. A total of 18 candidates ran for president in 2010. Before 7 April 2014, four Party of Regions members were running for election, but on 7 April 2014 the political council of the party expelled the presidential candidates Serhiy Tihipko, Oleh Tsarov and Yuriy Boiko from the party. On 29 March a Party of Regions convention supported Mykhailo Dobkin's nomination as a presidential candidate.

Candidates were able to nominate themselves at the Central Election Commission of Ukraine from 25 February 2014 until 30 March 2014. The last date for registering candidates was 4 April 2014. Candidates needed to submit a full package of documents and a ₴2.5 million deposit.

=== Registered candidates ===
- Olha Bohomolets (independent) (supported by the Socialist Party of Ukraine)
- Yuriy Boyko (self-nominated)
- Mykhailo Dobkin (Party of Regions)
- Andriy Hrynenko (independent)
- Anatoliy Hrytsenko (Civil Position)
- Valeriy Konovalyuk (independent)
- Vasyl Kuybida (People's Movement of Ukraine)
- Renat Kuzmin (independent)
- Oleh Lyashko (Radical Party)
- Mykola Malomuzh (independent)
- Petro Poroshenko (independent) (supported by UDAR)
- Vadym Rabynovych (independent)
- Volodymyr Saranov (independent)
- Serhiy Tihipko (self-nominated) (supported by Strong Ukraine)
- Oleh Tyahnybok (Svoboda)
- Yulia Tymoshenko (Batkivshchyna)
- Dmytro Yarosh (Right Sector, self-nominated)

=== Withdrawn candidates ===
==== Before deadline ====
- Natalia Korolevska (independent), withdrew from race on 1 May.
- Oleh Tsarov (self-nominated), withdrew from race on 29 April.

==== After deadline ====
- Zoryan Shkiryak (independent), withdrew from race on 10 May.
- Petro Symonenko (Communist Party of Ukraine), withdrew from race on 16 May.
- Oleksandr Klymenko (Ukrainian People's Party), withdrew his candidacy on May 18 "to support Petro Poroshenko as the sole representative of the national democratic forces".
- Vasyl Tsushko (independent), withdrew from race on 22 May.

The Central Election Commission was unable to remove from the ballot the names of candidates who withdrew from the race after the deadline of 1 May 2014.

=== Rejected candidates ===
The Central Election Commission rejected some applications for candidate registration early in the process. It refused to register O. Burnashova, V. Marynych, A. Makhlai, A. Kucheryavenko, V. Chopei, L. Rozhnova, L. Maksymenko, D. Myroshnychenko, P. Rekal, T. Onopriyuk, and Z. Abbasov. On 3 April 2014 the CEC rejected a further three candidates: a man named Darth Vader, Evhen Terekhov, and Yuriy Ivanitsky.

On 29 March 2014, Vitali Klitschko (UDAR) endorsed Petro Poroshenko, and announced he would run for Mayor of Kyiv in the local election taking place alongside the presidential election.

== Opinion polls ==
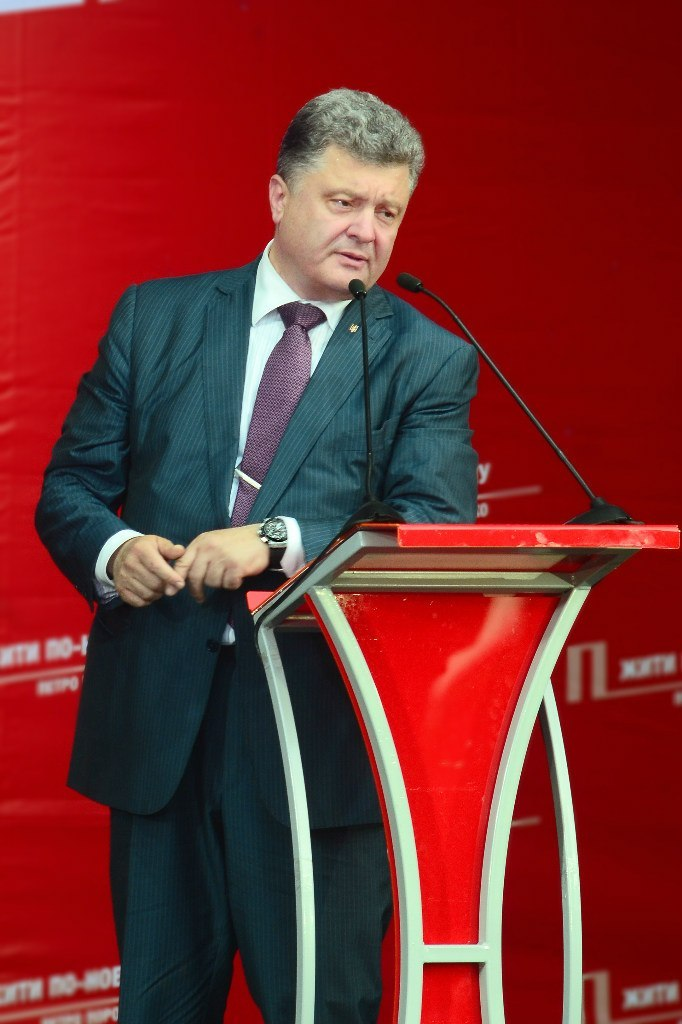
Petro Poroshenko with his slogan in background "Live in the New Way"

== International observers ==
The Central Election Commission of Ukraine (CEC) had registered 543 international official observers on 2 May 2014. On 23 May (two days before the election) this number had risen to 3,607 (CEC had completed the registration of observers on 19 May but on 23 May had allowed 823 members of the observer organization European Platform for Democratic Elections). Among others OSCE's Office for Democratic Institutions and Human Rights, OSCE's Parliamentary Assembly, the Ukrainian World Congress and the United States sent observers. OSCE deployed 100 long-term observers and 900 short-term observers. On 9 May 2014 U.S. Assistant Secretary for European and Eurasian Affairs Victoria Nuland stated her country would support 255 long-term and more than 3,300 short-term observers. Russia did not send observers. Other Commonwealth of Independent States members also did not send observers; because Ukraine had not sent an invitation to the CIS Election Monitoring Organisation.

== Results ==
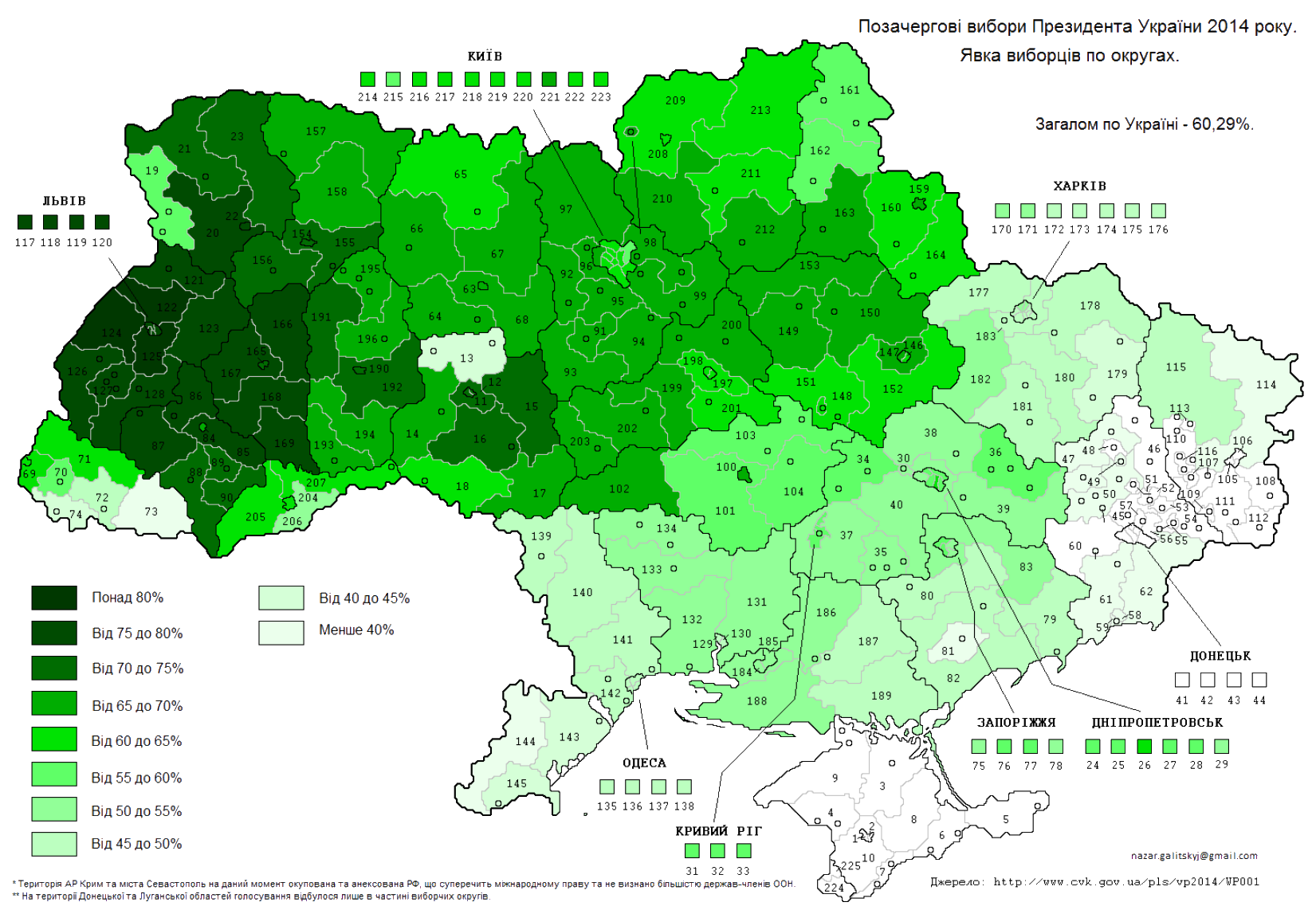
Turnout by region

Petro Poroshenko won the elections with 55% of the vote. His closest competitor was Yulia Tymoshenko, who emerged with 13% of the votes. The Central Election Commission reported voter turnout at 60% excluding those regions not under government control. In the Donbas region of Ukraine only 20% of the ballot stations were open due to threats and violence by pro-Russia separatists. Of the 2,430 planned ballot stations (in Donbas) only 426 remained open for polling.

Exit polls had also predicted that Poroshenko won the election outright with over 55.9% of the votes.

| Candidate | Party | Votes | % |
|---|---|---|---|
| Petro Poroshenko | Independent (UDAR) | 9,857,308 | 55.46 |
| Yulia Tymoshenko | Batkivshchyna | 2,310,050 | 13.00 |
| Oleh Liashko | Radical Party | 1,500,377 | 8.44 |
| Anatoliy Hrytsenko | Civil Position | 989,029 | 5.56 |
| Serhiy Tihipko | Independent (Strong Ukraine) | 943,430 | 5.31 |
| Mykhailo Dobkin | Party of Regions | 546,138 | 3.07 |
| Vadim Rabinovich | Independent | 406,301 | 2.29 |
| Olha Bohomolets | Independent | 345,384 | 1.94 |
| Petro Symonenko | Communist Party of Ukraine | 272,723 | 1.53 |
| Oleh Tyahnybok | Svoboda | 210,476 | 1.18 |
| Dmytro Yarosh | Right Sector | 127,772 | 0.72 |
| Andriy Hrynenko | Independent | 73,277 | 0.41 |
| Valeriy Konovalyuk | Independent | 69,572 | 0.39 |
| Yuriy Boyko | Independent | 35,928 | 0.20 |
| Mykola Malomuzh | Independent | 23,771 | 0.13 |
| Renat Kuzmin | Independent | 18,689 | 0.11 |
| Vasyl Kuybida | People's Movement of Ukraine | 12,391 | 0.07 |
| Oleksandr Klymenko | Ukrainian People's Party | 10,542 | 0.06 |
| Vasyl Tsushko | Independent | 10,434 | 0.06 |
| Volodymyr Saranov | Independent | 6,232 | 0.04 |
| Zoryan Shkiryak | Independent | 5,021 | 0.03 |
| Total | | 17,774,845 | 100.00 |
| Valid votes | | 17,774,845 | 98.64 |
| Invalid/blank votes | | 244,555 | 1.36 |
| Total votes | | 18,019,400 | 100.00 |
| Registered voters/turnout | | 30,095,028 | 59.88 |
Source: CEC

=== Results by oblast ===
Poroshenko finished first in every region in which voting took place, becoming the first Ukrainian presidential candidate to do so. His support was strongest in western and central Ukraine: he received more than 60% of the vote in Lviv, Vinnytsia, Ivano-Frankivsk, Ternopil, Zakarpattia and Kyiv oblasts, as well as in the city of Kyiv and among the overseas voters. In the remaining western oblasts, and across most of northern and central Ukraine, his support generally ranged from the low to high 50s. His weakest results were recorded in the east, including Luhansk, Kharkiv, Donetsk and Zaporizhzhia, where he received under 40% of the vote. Elsewhere in southern and eastern Ukraine, his support generally ranged from the low to high 40s. The result therefore represented a substantial weakening of the east–west electoral divide seen in previous presidential elections, although significant regional differences in support remained.

Tymoshenko and Liashko both performed strongest in western, northern and central Ukraine, particularly in more rural areas. Tymoshenko recorded her best results in Chernihiv, Chernivtsi, Volyn and Khmelnytskyi oblasts, while Liashko was strongest in his home region of Chernihiv, as well as Volyn and Rivne.

By contrast, Tihipko's support was concentrated in southern and eastern Ukraine, particularly in Donetsk, Odesa, Luhansk, Zaporizhzhia and Mykolaiv oblasts. Dobkin's support was even more geographically concentrated, reaching over 26% in his home region of Kharkiv, where he finished second.

Voter turnout also varied sharply by region. Across much of western Ukraine it ranged from the low to high 70s, while most northern and central oblasts recorded turnout in the low to high 60s. Participation was considerably lower in the south and east: it fell below 50% in Odesa and Kharkiv, while most other oblasts in these regions recorded turnout in the low to mid-50s. Turnout was exceptionally low in Donetsk (15.10%) and Luhansk (38.94%), where voting was severely disrupted by the ongoing armed conflict.

Lower participation in the east and south also occurred against a background of considerably greater distrust of the post-Maidan authorities. An April 2014 Pew Research Center survey found that only 24% of respondents in eastern Ukraine viewed the influence of the Kyiv government positively, compared with 60% in the west, while only 27% of eastern respondents expected the presidential election to be conducted fairly, compared with 59% in the west. These figures indicated substantial political alienation in parts of the east and south, although the particularly low turnout in Donetsk and Luhansk was also directly affected by violence and the inability to conduct voting across much of the two regions.

| Oblast | Poroshenko Independent (UDAR) | | Tymoshenko Batkivshchyna | | Liashko Radical Party | | Hrytsenko Civil Position | | Tihipko Independent (Strong Ukraine) | | Dobkin Party of Regions | | Rabinovich Independent | | Bohomolets Independent | | Symonenko Communist Party of Ukraine | | Tyahnybok Svoboda | | Yarosh Right Sector | | Others | | Turnout |
| Oblast | Votes | % | Votes | % | Votes | % | Votes | % | Votes | % | Votes | % | Votes | % | Votes | % | Votes | % | Votes | % | Votes | % | Votes | % | % |
|---|---|---|---|---|---|---|---|---|---|---|---|---|---|---|---|---|---|---|---|---|---|---|---|---|---|
| Cherkasy | 367,955 | 54.61 | 94,864 | 14.08 | 80,046 | 11.88 | 60,948 | 9.04 | 14,753 | 2.18 | 3,481 | 0.51 | 8,035 | 1.19 | 11,193 | 1.66 | 5,279 | 0.78 | 8,659 | 1.28 | 3,976 | 0.59 | 8,407 | 1.25 | 65.50 |
| Chernihiv | 249,740 | 44.81 | 108,593 | 19.48 | 92,509 | 16.59 | 34,770 | 6.23 | 20,998 | 3.76 | 6,483 | 1.16 | 8,385 | 1.50 | 8,228 | 1.47 | 7,267 | 1.30 | 5,239 | 0.94 | 2,419 | 0.43 | 6,555 | 1.18 | 64.48 |
| Chernivtsi | 244,915 | 56.72 | 81,371 | 18.84 | 45,351 | 10.50 | 13,479 | 3.12 | 11,680 | 2.70 | 1,885 | 0.43 | 4,743 | 1.09 | 6,329 | 1.46 | 3,275 | 0.75 | 5,454 | 1.26 | 2,366 | 0.54 | 5,088 | 1.18 | 61.54 |
| Dnipropetrovsk | 655,341 | 44.72 | 138,226 | 9.43 | 92,160 | 6.29 | 91,788 | 6.26 | 154,344 | 10.53 | 69,516 | 4.74 | 75,507 | 5.15 | 39,323 | 2.68 | 47,246 | 3.22 | 12,154 | 0.82 | 16,486 | 1.12 | 40,500 | 2.76 | 55.47 |
| Donetsk | 41,880 | 36.15 | 8,852 | 7.64 | 3,365 | 2.90 | 4,825 | 4.16 | 22,777 | 19.66 | 7,899 | 6.81 | 6,411 | 5.53 | 3,022 | 2.60 | 5,036 | 4.34 | 815 | 0.70 | 922 | 0.79 | 5,348 | 4.62 | 15.10 |
| Ivano-Frankivsk | 518,506 | 65.13 | 117,663 | 14.78 | 71,750 | 9.01 | 36,880 | 4.63 | 4,576 | 0.57 | 882 | 0.11 | 2,280 | 0.28 | 12,235 | 1.53 | 1,586 | 0.19 | 14,391 | 1.80 | 4,850 | 0.60 | 5,328 | 0.67 | 73.95 |
| Kharkiv | 364,751 | 35.28 | 79,051 | 7.64 | 40,616 | 3.92 | 45,756 | 4.42 | 88,293 | 8.54 | 271,386 | 26.25 | 39,536 | 3.82 | 22,144 | 2.14 | 27,482 | 2.65 | 6,397 | 0.61 | 7,766 | 0.75 | 19,591 | 1.89 | 47.90 |
| Kherson | 214,001 | 48.71 | 50,478 | 11.48 | 25,800 | 5.87 | 26,192 | 5.96 | 45,321 | 10.31 | 11,742 | 2.67 | 15,362 | 3.49 | 9,503 | 2.16 | 14,996 | 3.41 | 4,313 | 0.98 | 2,632 | 0.59 | 9,997 | 2.28 | 51.42 |
| Khmelnytskyi | 410,107 | 56.26 | 123,561 | 16.95 | 86,165 | 11.82 | 34,545 | 4.73 | 15,008 | 2.05 | 4,383 | 0.60 | 6,383 | 0.87 | 12,525 | 1.71 | 5,624 | 0.77 | 12,017 | 1.64 | 3,701 | 0.50 | 7,453 | 1.02 | 69.61 |
| Kyiv (city) | 884,638 | 64.10 | 129,451 | 9.38 | 90,848 | 6.58 | 96,680 | 7.00 | 44,998 | 3.26 | 9,599 | 0.69 | 22,119 | 1.60 | 28,936 | 2.09 | 10,829 | 0.78 | 16,821 | 1.21 | 17,539 | 1.27 | 14,873 | 1.08 | 62.70 |
| Kyiv Oblast | 614,264 | 61.67 | 135,568 | 13.61 | 97,152 | 9.75 | 51,040 | 5.12 | 21,556 | 2.16 | 4,323 | 0.43 | 11,356 | 1.14 | 17,225 | 1.72 | 6,072 | 0.60 | 11,206 | 1.12 | 6,909 | 0.69 | 11,038 | 1.11 | 68.39 |
| Kirovohrad | 238,396 | 50.96 | 75,575 | 16.15 | 54,027 | 11.55 | 27,312 | 5.83 | 19,162 | 4.09 | 6,202 | 1.32 | 9,513 | 2.03 | 8,984 | 1.92 | 7,032 | 1.50 | 6,506 | 1.39 | 2,292 | 0.49 | 7,117 | 1.52 | 60.25 |
| Luhansk | 17,329 | 33.17 | 4,059 | 7.77 | 3,225 | 6.17 | 2,378 | 4.55 | 8,225 | 15.74 | 4,194 | 8.02 | 3,078 | 5.89 | 1,263 | 2.41 | 2,839 | 5.43 | 411 | 0.78 | 218 | 0.41 | 2,704 | 5.18 | 38.94 |
| Lviv | 1,079,661 | 69.92 | 172,881 | 11.19 | 104,729 | 6.78 | 90,613 | 5.86 | 12,891 | 0.83 | 1,828 | 0.11 | 5,334 | 0.34 | 22,726 | 1.47 | 3,546 | 0.22 | 18,062 | 1.16 | 11,728 | 0.75 | 10,550 | 0.68 | 78.20 |
| Mykolaiv | 217,227 | 45.97 | 46,029 | 9.74 | 24,670 | 5.22 | 19,594 | 4.14 | 61,989 | 13.11 | 20,400 | 4.31 | 25,949 | 5.49 | 11,977 | 2.53 | 17,599 | 3.72 | 3,934 | 0.83 | 2,626 | 0.55 | 10,552 | 2.23 | 51.61 |
| Odesa | 349,631 | 41.78 | 79,333 | 9.48 | 29,962 | 3.58 | 24,519 | 2.93 | 155,427 | 18.57 | 32,221 | 3.85 | 51,747 | 6.18 | 21,826 | 2.60 | 32,109 | 3.83 | 7,588 | 0.90 | 5,633 | 0.67 | 21,341 | 2.55 | 46.01 |
| Poltava | 415,591 | 54.55 | 106,272 | 13.95 | 81,124 | 10.64 | 42,084 | 5.52 | 32,500 | 4.26 | 10,517 | 1.38 | 14,660 | 1.92 | 15,099 | 1.98 | 10,579 | 1.38 | 9,416 | 1.23 | 4,271 | 0.56 | 10,605 | 1.39 | 64.67 |
| Rivne | 341,002 | 55.46 | 98,774 | 16.06 | 81,373 | 13.23 | 30,999 | 5.04 | 12,916 | 2.10 | 1,722 | 0.28 | 4,715 | 0.76 | 12,927 | 2.10 | 3,462 | 0.56 | 10,445 | 1.69 | 4,302 | 0.69 | 6,359 | 1.03 | 70.97 |
| Sumy | 316,180 | 55.40 | 81,846 | 14.34 | 53,296 | 9.33 | 32,512 | 5.69 | 23,883 | 4.18 | 11,472 | 2.01 | 10,382 | 1.81 | 9,152 | 1.60 | 9,410 | 1.64 | 5,426 | 0.95 | 3,089 | 0.54 | 7,190 | 1.26 | 62.16 |
| Ternopil | 394,207 | 60.63 | 98,660 | 15.17 | 65,852 | 10.12 | 49,021 | 7.54 | 4,502 | 0.69 | 737 | 0.11 | 1,607 | 0.24 | 7,919 | 1.21 | 1,160 | 0.17 | 12,185 | 1.87 | 4,247 | 0.65 | 5,720 | 0.88 | 76.63 |
| Vinnytsia | 602,678 | 67.32 | 139,406 | 15.57 | 49,698 | 5.55 | 36,846 | 4.11 | 15,092 | 1.68 | 4,208 | 0.47 | 7,696 | 0.85 | 8,486 | 0.94 | 5,747 | 0.64 | 7,594 | 0.84 | 3,329 | 0.37 | 6,973 | 0.78 | 66.04 |
| Volyn | 304,931 | 52.41 | 100,792 | 17.32 | 84,708 | 14.55 | 35,812 | 6.15 | 11,057 | 1.90 | 2,549 | 0.43 | 3,306 | 0.56 | 11,235 | 1.93 | 2,739 | 0.47 | 11,190 | 1.92 | 3,182 | 0.54 | 5,765 | 0.99 | 71.82 |
| Zakarpattia | 301,617 | 62.02 | 62,608 | 12.87 | 36,036 | 7.41 | 19,582 | 4.02 | 15,309 | 3.14 | 10,074 | 2.07 | 7,426 | 1.52 | 7,132 | 1.46 | 2,746 | 0.56 | 6,150 | 1.26 | 2,774 | 0.57 | 6,695 | 1.38 | 51.08 |
| Zaporizhzhia | 280,734 | 38.15 | 71,597 | 9.73 | 36,196 | 4.91 | 45,828 | 6.22 | 101,129 | 13.74 | 44,041 | 5.98 | 51,326 | 6.97 | 21,973 | 2.98 | 30,561 | 4.15 | 5,463 | 0.74 | 5,642 | 0.76 | 21,943 | 2.98 | 51.14 |
| Zhytomyr | 386,647 | 58.64 | 99,467 | 15.08 | 62,938 | 9.54 | 29,154 | 4.42 | 23,464 | 3.55 | 4,022 | 0.61 | 9,013 | 1.36 | 11,018 | 1.67 | 8,008 | 1.21 | 7,604 | 1.15 | 3,376 | 0.51 | 7,314 | 1.11 | 66.02 |
| Overseas | 45,379 | 62.31 | 5,073 | 6.96 | 6,781 | 9.31 | 5,872 | 8.06 | 1,580 | 2.16 | 372 | 0.51 | 432 | 0.59 | 3,004 | 4.12 | 494 | 0.67 | 1,036 | 1.42 | 1,497 | 2.05 | 718 | 0.99 | 15.36 |
| Ukraine | 9,857,308 | 54.70 | 2,310,050 | 12.81 | 1,500,377 | 8.32 | 989,029 | 5.48 | 943,430 | 5.23 | 546,138 | 3.03 | 406,301 | 2.25 | 345,384 | 1.91 | 272,723 | 1.51 | 210,476 | 1.16 | 127,772 | 0.70 | 265,857 | 1.48 | 59.48 |
Source: Central Electoral Commission

Italicised oblasts were only partially under Ukrainian government control, and voting took place only in areas where it could be organised. No voting was held in Crimea or Sevastopol following their annexation by Russia.

== Reactions ==
Despite Russia's earlier protest at rescheduling the election and the general tense relation between the countries at the time because of the annexation of Crimea and the Russian military intervention in Ukraine, Russian president Vladimir Putin recognised the vote.

The leaders of the self-proclaimed Donetsk People's Republic and Luhansk People's Republic, controlling large parts of the Donbas region of Eastern Ukraine, declared that the regions had made their choice shown in the highly disputed results of the status referendum of 11 May.

US president Barack Obama congratulated Petro Poroshenko with his victory by telephone 2 days after the election. This was also done by President of the European Commission José Manuel Barroso and European Parliament President Martin Schulz and other EU leaders such as German chancellor Angela Merkel and French president François Hollande.
