= Konovalyuk =

Konovalyuk or Konovaliuk is a Ukrainian-language surname derived from the occupation of konoval [ коновал ], an archaic term for "veterinarian", literally meaning "descendant of konoval". Notable people with this surname include:

- Oleksandr Konovaliuk, Ukrainian rower
- Valeriy Konovalyuk, Ukrainian politician and statesman

== See also ==
- Konovalyuk Commission
- Konovalov, Russian surname with the same derivation
