= Drăgănești, Sîngerei =

Drăgănești
- Commune
- Location in Moldova
- Coordinates: 47°43′N 28°15′E
- Country: Moldova
- District: Sîngerei District

Population (2014)
  - Total: 2,940
- Time zone: UTC+2 (EET)
  - Summer (DST): UTC+3 (EEST)

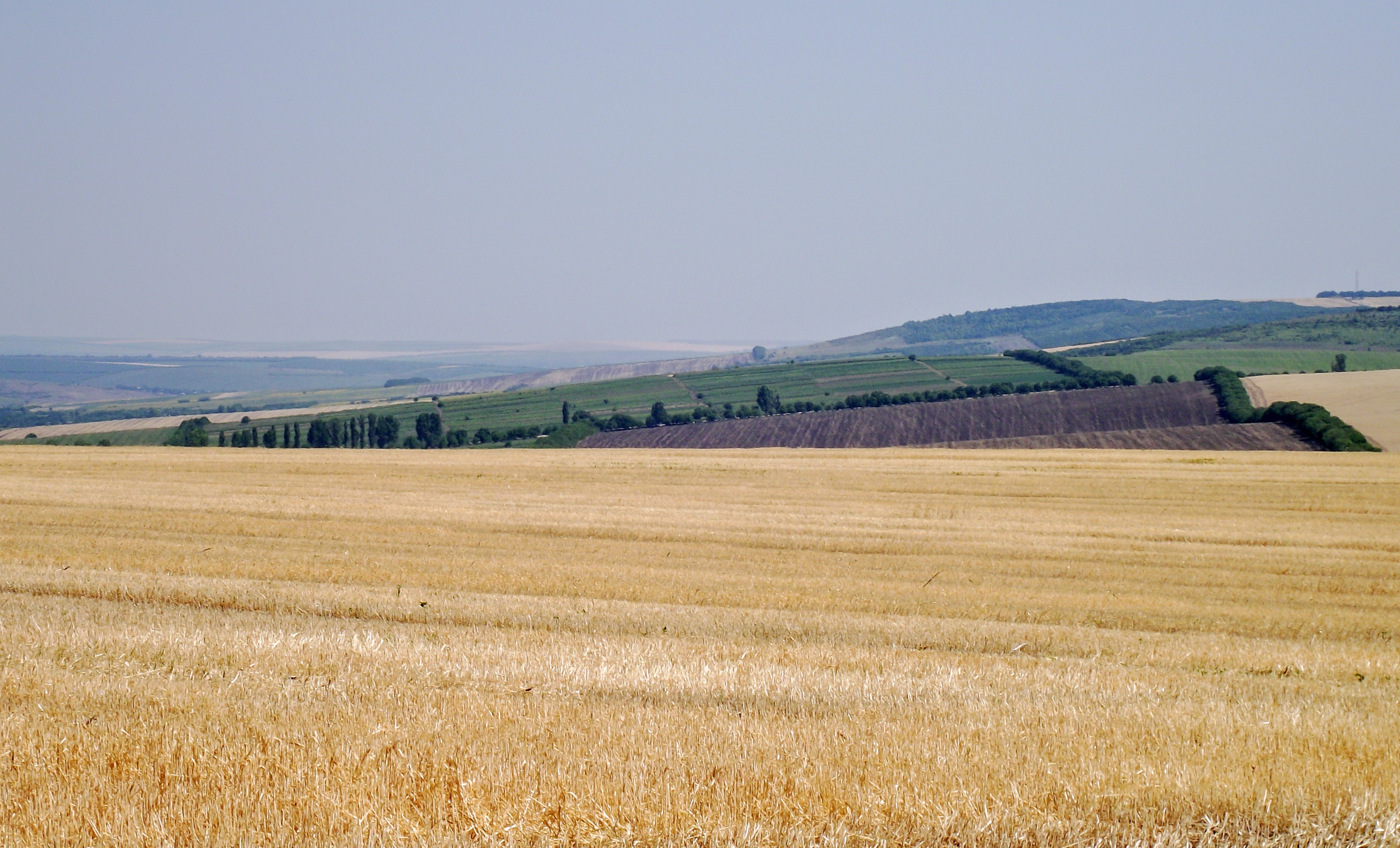

Drăgănești is a commune in Sîngerei District, Moldova. It is composed of three villages: Chirileni, Drăgănești and Sacarovca.

== Notable people ==
- Alexandru Groapă
- Serhiy Tihipko
