= Konovalenko (surname) =

Konovalenko is a Ukrainian-language surname derived from the occupation of konoval [ коновал ], an archaic term for "veterinarian", literally meaning "descendant of konoval". Notable people with this surname include:

- Vasily Konovalenko
- Viktor Konovalenko

== See also ==
- Konovalov, Russian surname with the same derivation
- Konovalyuk
- Konoval
