= Labour Ukraine =

Labour Ukraine Трудова Україна
- Founded: 21 June 2000
- Dissolved: 30 November 2018
- Headquarters: Kyiv
- Ideology: Labourism; Liberalism
- Political position: Centre-left
- National affiliation: Opposition Bloc (2014–2018)
- Colours: Dark blue
- Verkhovna Rada (2014) (Note: Part of the Opposition Bloc until 2018.): 29 / 450

Labour Ukraine (Ukrainian: Трудова Україна, romanized: Trudova Ukraina) was a political party in Ukraine registered in June 2000. On 30 November 2018, the party was dissolved along with other Opposition Bloc members.

== History ==
A Labour Ukraine faction was created after the 1998 parliamentary election on April 20, 1999. In September 2000 the Labour Ukraine faction in the Ukrainian Parliament numbered 45 MPs and was the second largest entity in the parliament. Serhiy Tihipko was elected party leader in November 2000. The party supported President of Ukraine Leonid Kuchma during his presidency.

At the legislative elections of 30 March 2002, the party was part of the For United Ukraine alliance. winning 49 seats, their list of deputies included Viktor Pinchuk. The party leader was Serhiy Tyhypko. After the 2004 presidential election Tihipko stepped out of Ukrainian politics, resigning as Labour Ukraine leader on April 23, 2005, before returning to it in the 2010 presidential election.

In the 2006 elections, the party failed on its own to win parliamentary representation, winning only 0,09% of the votes.

In the 2007 parliamentary elections the party did not participate. In this election Labour Ukraine members, including party leader Valeriy Konovalyuk, decided to join the Party of Regions election list. Again in the 2012 parliamentary elections the party was absent.

In the 2014 Ukrainian parliamentary election members of the party took part in the elections on the party list of Opposition Bloc; Opposition Bloc won 29 seats.
