= Konovalyuk Commission =

Ukrainian parliament commission on arms exports to Georgia

The Konovalyuk Commission, officially, the "Temporary Commission of the Parliament of Ukraine on Clarifying the Circumstances and Investigating the Facts of Supplies of Ukrainian Military Equipment to Georgia in Violation of Ukrainian Legislation and International Law" (Ukrainian: Тимчасова слідча комісія Верховної Ради України з питань з’ясування обставин та встановлення фактів поставки до Грузії української військової техніки з порушенням законодавства України та норм міжнародного права, romanized: Tymchasova slidcha komisiia Verkhovnoi Rady Ukrainy z pytan ziasuvannia obstavyn ta vstanovlennia faktiv postavky do Hruzii ukrainskoi viiskovoi tekhniky z porushenniam zakonodavstva Ukrainy ta norm mizhnarodnoho prava), was an ad hoc commission formed in the Ukrainian parliament to investigate the legality of arms exports from Ukraine to Georgia and Ukraine's involvement in the 2008 South Ossetia War. The commission, headed by Valeriy Konovalyuk of the Party of Regions, was formed on September 2, 2008. In December 2008, the commission released a report, accusing the Ukrainian leadership of arming Georgia in violation of Ukrainian and international law. On December 19, 2008, the parliament heard the report and decided to consider it and to forward it to the President and the Prime Minister of Ukraine, while the office of the Prosecutor General of Ukraine is requested to evaluate its findings. The Prosecutor General is further asked to give a legal evaluation of the measures taken by Ukraine's security services and the Ministry of Defence that, according to the commission, were aimed at interfering with its investigation. At the same time, the parliament refused to extend the commission's mandate until June 2009 and to suspend the weapons exports to Georgia, as suggested by the commission.

== Background ==
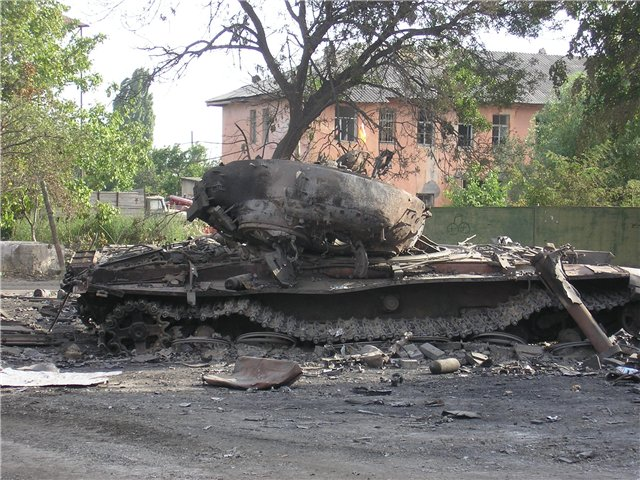
Burned Georgian T-72 tank, supplied by Ukraine, after the Battle of Tskhinvali.

On August 7, 2008, a war broke out between Georgia on one side and its secessionist territories of South Ossetia and Abkhazia, supported by Russia, on another. Shortly after, Russia accused Ukraine of illegally supplying the Georgian Army with weapons and claimed that the Ukrainian mercenaries participated in the conflict on the Georgian side. Ukraine denies illegal export of its weapons and involvement of its nationals in the conflict. A commission was thus created in the Ukrainian parliament to investigate the Russian claims.

== Members of the commission ==
The commission was composed of 6 people's deputies representing every political party or bloc in the parliament, except for the pro-presidential Our Ukraine–People's Self-Defense Bloc.

- Valeriy Konovalyuk (Party of Regions) – Head of Commission
- Igor Alekseyev (Communist Party of Ukraine) – Deputy Head of Commission
- Valeriy Bondyk (Party of Regions)
- Serhiy Hrynevetsky (Lytvyn Bloc)
- Serhiy Osyka (Yulia Tymoshenko Bloc)
- Mykola Petruk (Yulia Tymoshenko Bloc)

== Investigation and findings ==
The commission summarized its findings in a report, issued in December 2008. It concluded that Ukraine exported a variety of assault weapons, such as tanks, BMP infantry fighting vehicles, BTR armoured personnel carriers, 2S7 Pion self-propelled artillery units, Grad multiple rocket launcher units, and Mil Mi-24 attack helicopters just prior to the onset of the South Ossetian war. The report also claims that some weapons exports were conducted in a manner detrimental to Ukraine's defence: a number of Buk missile system units sold to Georgia were taken off active duty, thus diminishing Ukraine's air defence capabilities. Furthermore, the report alleges widespread financial machinations involving weapons being sold for prices 3–5 times lower than the market value and payments not reaching Ukraine's budget. Additionally, the commission released a list of Ukrainian military specialists, thought to have been present in Georgia during the onset of the war.

== Reaction ==
All the parties implicated by the commission have strongly denied any wrongdoing, accusing the commission of using its position as a tool in the ongoing political struggle for power.
