= Valeriy Konovalyuk =

Ukrainian politician (born 1966)

- Валерій Коновалюк
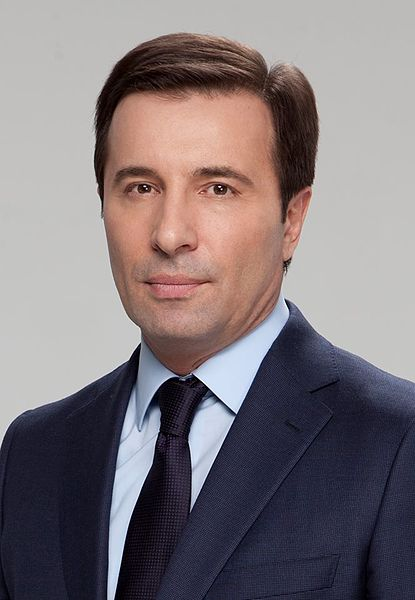
- Konovalyuk in 2014

People's Deputy of Ukraine
- In office 23 November 2007 – 12 December 2012
- Constituency: Party of Regions, No. 84
- In office 29 March 1998 – 25 May 2006
- Preceded by: Constituency established
- Succeeded by: Constituency abolished
- Constituency: Donetsk Oblast, No. 62

Personal details
- Born: 31 August 1966 (age 59) Donetsk, Ukrainian SSR, Soviet Union
- Party: Party of Regions (c. 2002–2005, 2007–2012)
- Other political affiliations: Labour Ukraine (2000–c. 2002, 2005–2007); Independent (until 2000)
- Website: konovaluk.com (Archived 11 March 2016)

Military service
- Allegiance: Soviet Union
- Branch/service: Soviet Army
- Years of service: 1989–1992
- Unit: Western Group of Forces

Valeriy Illich Konovalyuk (Ukrainian: Валерій Ілліч Коновалюк; born 31 August 1966) is a Ukrainian politician who was a People's Deputy of Ukraine from 1998 to 2006 and from 2007 to 2012, first from Ukraine's 62nd electoral district in Donetsk Oblast and later on the proportional representative list of the Party of Regions. Konovalyuk was a candidate in the 2014 Ukrainian presidential election, in which he gathered 0.38% of the vote.

== Early life and career ==
Valeriy Illich Konovalyuk was born 31 August 1966 in the city of Donetsk, in eastern Ukraine. In 1985 he graduated from Donetsk industrial technical school on a specialty "Maintenance and repair of motor vehicles", in 1989 - from the Moscow Higher Command School, in 1993 - The German Finance Academy (Munich) on the specialty "Economics and organization of production". He worked as a mechanic at a motor enterprise (Makiivka). From 1989 to 1992 he served as an officer under the Western Group of Forces, based in Germany, and was based in Wismar and East Berlin. From 1992 to 1994 he was the director of JSC "Ukrenergoresurs" and president of the Donetsk-based broadcasting company BIKO.

Konovalyuk became deputy chairman of the Donetsk city council in 1995, representing Kuibyshevskyi District. His portfolio included planning, finance and the budget. In 1995, Konovalyuk created and headed the People's Patriotic Union of Donbas. From 1996 to 1998 he was an advisor to the chairman and deputy chairman of Donetsk Regional State Administration.

== Political career ==
Konovalyuk has been elected to the Verkhovna Rada (Ukrainian parliament) three times (in 1998, 2002, and 2007). He represented Ukraine's 62nd electoral district, located in Donetsk Oblast, from 1998 to 2006, later serving on the proportional representation list of the Party of Regions from 2007 to 2012. Konovalyuk was originally elected as an independent; he joined the Labour Ukraine party in 2000, remaining a member for two years before joining the Regions of Ukraine faction and later becoming a founding member of the Party of Regions. In April 2005 he left the Party of Regions and rejoined Labour Ukraine. He was later elected as leader of Labour Ukraine. In August 2007 Labour Ukraine (including Konovalyuk) decided to join the Party of Regions' proportional representation list in the 2007 Ukrainian parliamentary election. Konovalyuk did not participate in the 2012 Ukrainian parliamentary election because he wanted a "timeout".

Konovalyuk was the first deputy head of the Budget Committee of the Verkhovna Rada; chairman of the subcommittee on questions of planning budgetary programs and control over the using of budgetary funds in Health Care of Health Care Committee. He was also head of the eponymous Konovalyuk Commission, which accused the Ukrainian government of violating international law by supplying weapons to Georgia during the 2008 Russo-Georgian War.

Konovalyuk was the author of a number of draft laws, including the Budget Code of Ukraine, the Draft Law on State Financial Control, the Draft Law on the State Treasury, the Draft Law on the Financing of Healthcare and Mandatory Medical Insurance in Ukraine, and reforms to policing, as well as drafting an updated version of the Labour Code.

In the summer of 2009 Konovalyuk was elected as a chairman of the All-Ukrainian Union of Servicemen and Veterans of the Ukrainian Armed Forces. In June 2010, he became an advisor to President Viktor Yanukovych. In April 2013, he resigned from his position as advisor and left the Party of Regions, claiming that Yanukovych had refused all advice he had given and that corruption and abuse of power within his government was a "direct path to crisis and the bankruptcy of the country".

On 30 March 2014 he was registered in the Central Election Commission as an independent candidate in the 2014 Ukrainian presidential election. Konovalyuk visited the European Union and the United States in April of that year, during which time he presented a plan for solving the Russo-Ukrainian War to the United States Congress and multiple think tanks. Konovalyuk pledged to personally fight Russian President Vladimir Putin if elected He ultimately received 0.38% of the vote.

On 17 May 2014, Konovalyuk was unanimously elected as the head of the New Ukraine party during the party's congress. He sought re-election to the Verkhovna Rada in the 2014 Ukrainian parliamentary election, running as an independent in Ukraine's 59th electoral district (located in the city of Marinka). He was not successfully elected, placing third with 8.50% of the vote.

== Investing and financing activities ==
In August 2010, he became a chairman of the board of the Business Council "Ukraine-China" and was included in the Intergovernmental Ukrainian-Chinese Commission on questions of trade and economic cooperation. Since October 2012 he actively engaged in financial activities and the implementation of joint investment projects in countries of the EU and Eastern Europe.

== Awards ==
Honored Economist of Ukraine. Awarded by the Order "For Merit" II and III degree, Diploma of the Verkhovna Rada of Ukraine (2003), Diploma of the Government of Ukraine (2004).

== Personal life ==
Valeriy Konovalyuk has four children. He has two children from his first marriage – daughter Eugenia (1993) and son Vladislav (1996). Now he is married for the second time on the Ukrainian TV presenter and journalist Valeria Ushakova. Two children: Ilya and Lukiya (2015). Konovalyuk is a fan of judo, tennis and books. He headed the Judo Federation of Donetsk Oblast. He speaks German and English.

Party political offices
Preceded by Serhiy Tihipko	Leader of Labour Ukraine; 2005–2006	Succeeded by Oleksandr Videnko
