= Konoval =

Konoval or Konowal is a Slavic-language surname literally meaning the occupation of konoval [ коновал ], an archaic term for "veterinarian". Variants include Koneval and Konefal. Notable people with this surname include:

- Filip Konowal (1887–1959), Ukrainian Canadian soldier
- Karin Konoval (born 1961), Canadian-American actress
- Serhii Konoval (1992–2024), Ukrainian public activist, paramedic, soldier
- Victoria Konefal (born 1996), American actress
