= Serhiy Tihipko =

Ukrainian politician

- Сергій Тiгiпко
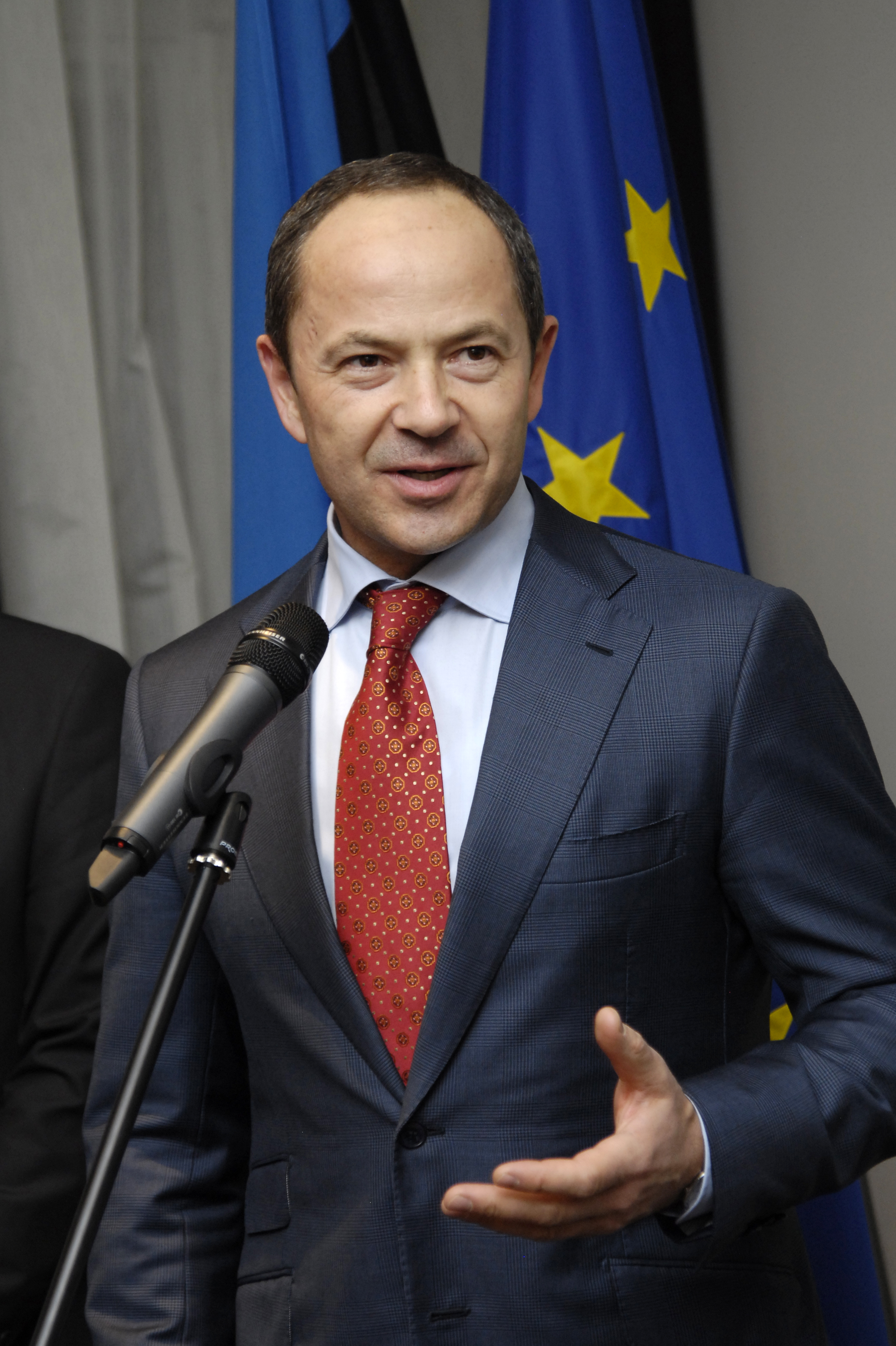
- Tihipko in 2012

People's Deputy of Ukraine
- In office 12 December 2012 – 27 November 2014

Vice Prime Minister Minister of Social Policy
- In office 11 March 2010 – 24 December 2012
- Prime Minister: Mykola Azarov
- Preceded by: Vasyl Nadraha
- Succeeded by: Natalia Korolevska

Minister of Economics
- In office 31 December 1999 – 5 July 2000
- Prime Minister: Viktor Yushchenko
- Preceded by: Vasyl Rohovyi
- Succeeded by: Vasyl Rohovyi

Governor of the National Bank of Ukraine
- In office 17 December 2002 – 16 December 2004
- President: Leonid Kuchma
- Preceded by: Volodymyr Stelmakh
- Succeeded by: Volodymyr Stelmakh

Personal details
- Born: 13 February 1960 (age 66) Drăgănești, Sîngerei District, Moldavian SSR, Soviet Union
- Party: Strong Ukraine (2014–present)
- Other political affiliations: Party of Regions (2012–2014); Strong Ukraine (2009–2012); Labour Ukraine (2000–2004), Communist Party of the Soviet Union (1984–1991)
- Spouses: Natalya Tigipko (m. 1981; div. 2004) Viktoriya Tigipko (m. 2005)
- Children: Anna (born 1984) and three other children from second marriage
- Occupation: politician
- Website: www.tigipko.com

Military service
- Allegiance: Soviet Union
- Branch/service: Soviet Army

Serhiy Leonidovych Tihipko (Ukrainian: Сергій Леонідович Тiгiпко; born 13 February 1960) is a Ukrainian businessman and politician who was Vice Prime Minister of Ukraine. After founding the TAS Group conglomerate in 1998, Tihipko was Minister of Economics in 2000 and subsequently served as Governor of the National Bank of Ukraine from 2002 to 2004. He ran unsuccessfully for President of Ukraine in the 2010 presidential election and participated in the 2014 presidential election, in which he placed fifth with 5.23 percent of the vote. Tihipko is also a former Vice Prime Minister and Minister of Social Policy.

== Early life ==
Tihipko was born on 13 February 1960 in the village of Drăgănești, Sîngerei, in the Lazovskiy district of the Moldavian SSR in a Ukrainian family who moved there from Podolia in 1902. His father fought in World War II, where he was badly wounded, and died when Tihipko was 10. His mother was a village nurse. He has two brothers: one six years older, and one two years younger.

Tihipko grew up in suburb of Chișinau and moved to Dnipropetrovsk, Ukrainian SSR, after finishing school when he was 17.

== Education, military service, and the Komsomol ==
Tihipko was educated at the local school in Lazovskiy district, and then went to university in Dnipropetrovsk, where he graduated in engineering-metallurgy from the Dnipropetrovsk Metallurgical Institute in 1982.

He served in the Soviet Army in a tank regiment from 1982 to 1984.

Tihipko was first head of a department, and then deputy director for teaching and educational work at the Dnipropetrovsk Mechanical-Metallurgical Technical Secondary School from 1984 to 1986. At the same time he developed a strong career in Komsomol, the youth arm of the Communist Party of the Soviet Union. This enabled him to become First Secretary of Dnipropetrovsk Komsomol regional organization from 1986 to 1989; there were nearly half a million members of Komsomol in the Dnipropetrovsk region, and Tihipko became its first popularly elected First Secretary in 1989. From 1989 to 1991, Tihipko was the First Secretary of Dnipropetrovsk regional committee of the All-Union Leninist Young Communist League.

== Banking (1991–1997) ==
"After the break up of the Soviet Union and the results of the political power struggles that followed he decided to put his political interests aside and start a business career as a manager in a private bank. This was an undeveloped industry in the early stages of the former Soviet Union and it turned out to be a shrewd move." He "made swift progress and from 1991–1992 he was appointed Deputy Chairman of a small commercial bank called Dnipro Bank. From there, he became Chairman of the Board of the commercial bank Privatbank until 1997, helping in taking the small regional bank to become one of the biggest private banks in Eastern Europe."

== Political career (1994, onwards) ==
In 1994, he became a non-staff consultant on monetary policy to the President Leonid Kuchma. He was also an advisor to Kuchma in the lead up to the introduction of the national currency, the Hryvnia in 1996. Realising that there was a conflict of interest between his political role and his shareholding in Privat Bank, he divested himself of the shares

Tihipko served as the minister of economics (1997–1999). In June 2000 Tihipko left the Yushchenko Government to take part in a parliamentary by-election on 25 June and eventually won a seat at the majoritarian constituency #36 in the Dnipropetrovsk Oblast. In November 2000 became member and leader of Labour Ukraine. At the 2002 parliamentary elections, with the Labour Ukraine being part of the For United Ukraine alliance, he was again elected into parliament. Tihipko was Governor of the National Bank of Ukraine in the years 2002–2004.

Tihipko chaired the election campaign in 2004 for presidential candidate Viktor Yanukovych. After the election Tihipko temporarily left Ukrainian politics, resigning as Labour Ukraine leader on 23 April 2005, to build up a bank which he sold to Swedbank group for nearly $1 billion. Tihipko was an ally of former president Leonid Kuchma. Analysts have claimed Kuchma should have given his support to Tihipko during the 2004 Ukrainian presidential elections instead of supporting Viktor Yanukovych, however Yanukovych had more popular support.

Korrespondent estimated his fortune at $369 million in 2009.

=== Ukrainian presidential election, 2010 ===
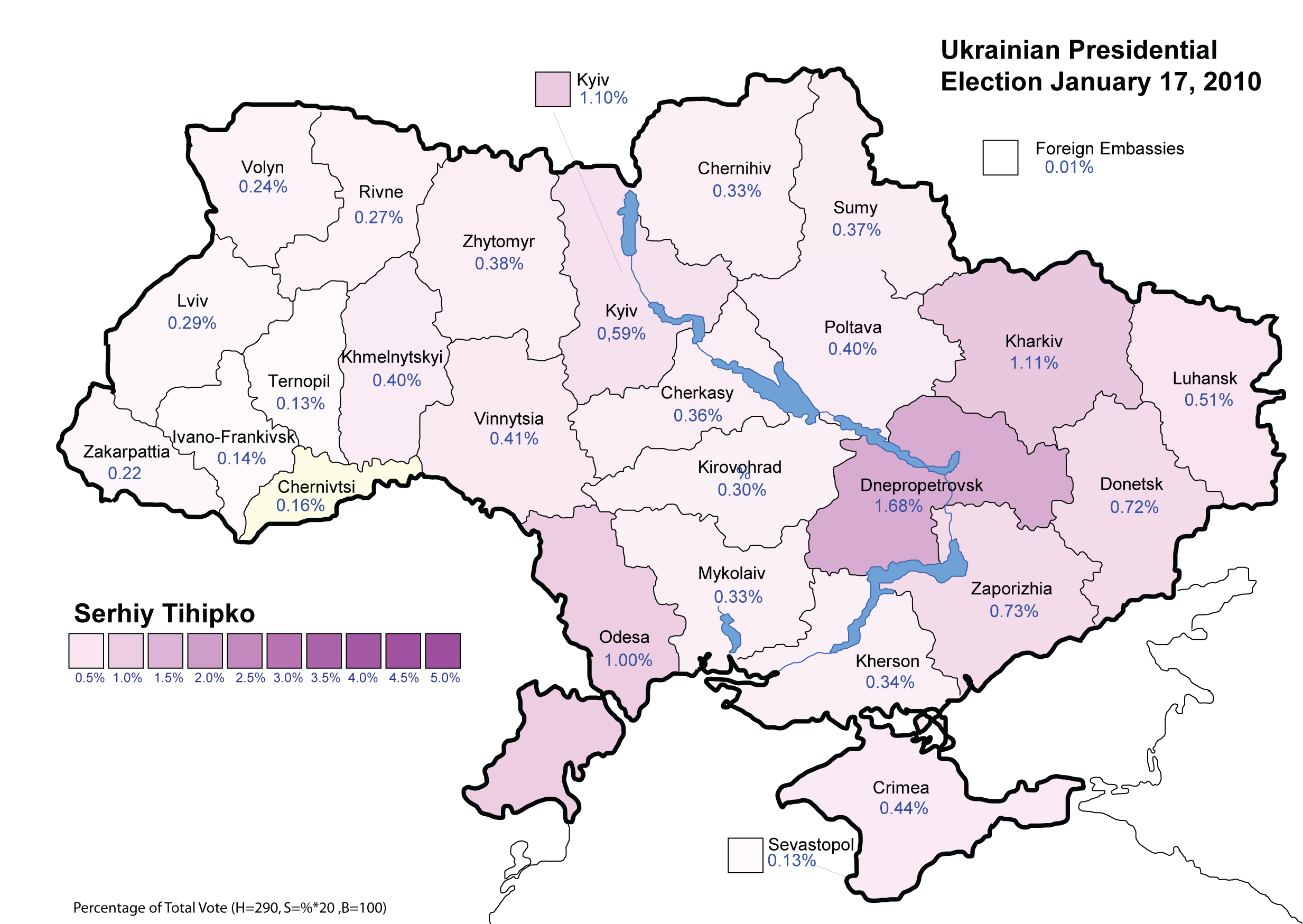
Serhiy Tihipko (first round) – percentage of total national vote (13.06%)

Tihipko was elected leader of the party Strong Ukraine in November 2009. In January 2010, Tihipko declared "his team" will participate in the 2014 Kyiv local election.

Tihipko was a candidate for President of Ukraine in the 2010 presidential election.

Of the 18 presidential candidates, Tihipko has declared the highest income to the Ukrainian election Committee. He had an income of about $2.5 million in 2008 and told Kyiv Post he had spent roughly the same amount on his presidential campaign till December 2009. “I will spend as much as I need. This is my own money.” Tihipko claims he has spent 90 million hryvnia (about $11 million) on his election campaign.

Tihipko was defeated in the first round of the presidential election, receiving 13.05% of the vote; two candidates (Yulia Tymoshenko and Viktor Yanukovych) received more votes.

On 22 January 2010, Tihipko warned outgoing president Viktor Yushchenko could introduce a state of emergency during the transfer of power after the presidential election 2010.

Tihipko did not endorse a candidate for the run-off of the election. He did state he would agree to become Prime Minister of Ukraine under the new president whose program is close to him. Tymoshenko did offer Tihipko to become Prime Minister if she won the election. While (then) candidate Victor Yanukovych stated that Tihipko and (another 2010 presidential candidate) Arseniy Yatseniuk would "have a good chance to be in the team that will unite Ukraine and will build our country together with me".

According to a poll by Research & Branding Group, as of 27 November Tihipko was running fifth in polls at 4.4%, behind Viktor Yanukovych (32.4%), Yulia Tymoshenko (16.3%), Arseniy Yatseniuk (6.1%) and Volodymyr Lytvyn (4.5%), and ahead of Petro Symonenko (3.8%) and incumbent President Viktor Yushchenko (3.5%).

A poll conducted by FOM-Ukraine in late November placed him in third place at 7.4%, with 23% of the respondents stating that they consider Tihipko "a promising young politician whom they would like to see at the presidential elections." Director of the Penta Center for Applied Political Studies Volodymyr Fesenko thought that this third-place by Tihipko could be explained by the fact that some voters started to consider Tihipko not only an alternative to the leader of the Party of Regions Viktor Yanukovych, but as an alternative to fellow candidate Arseniy Yatseniuk. According to a Russian poll taken in the last week of the campaign, Serhiy Tihipko was to be the unexpected outsider, snapping the second place from Tymoshenko.

According to the results of an exit poll initiated by the ICTV TV channel, Tihipko would have won the 2010 presidential election if he had participated in the second round of the election.

=== Political career after the 2010 presidential election ===
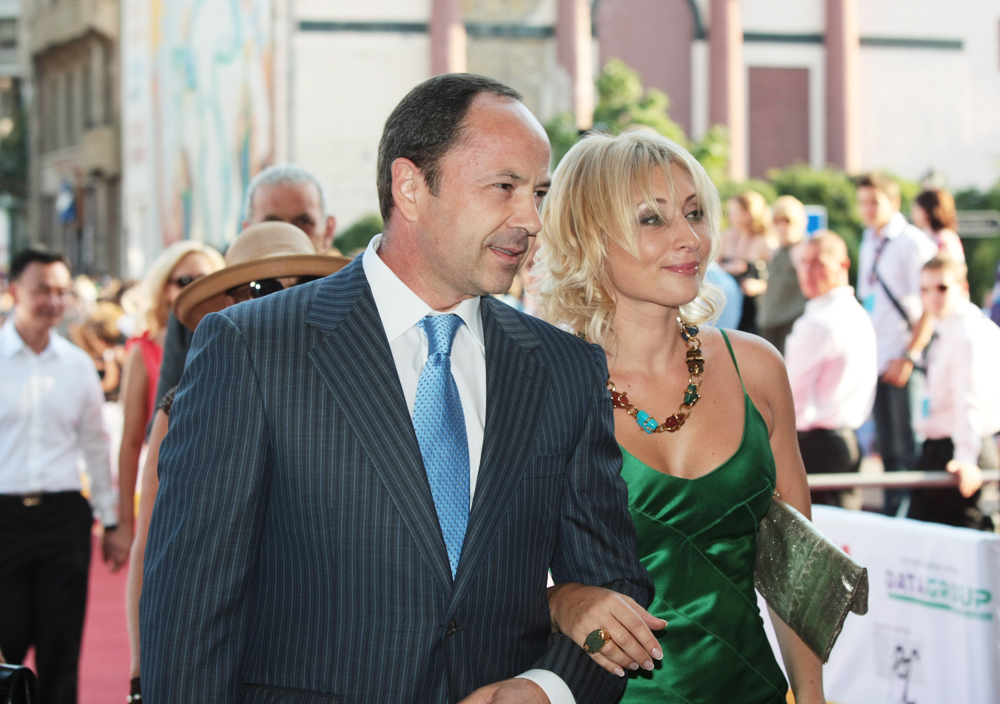
Tihipko and spouse Viktoria in July 2010 at the Odesa International Film Festival

On 11 February 2010, Tihipko stated that he would agree to become Prime Minister of Ukraine if President Victor Yanukovych offered him the post. On 15 February Yanukovych stated "I do not rule out the candidature of Tihipko. Tihipko is on the list which, in my opinion, will be discussed next week in parliament". On 17 February 2010 Tihipko stated that he had met Yanukovych twice after the election to discuss issues of the country's development and that he had reached no agreement with the parliamentary faction of the Our Ukraine-People's Self-Defense Bloc regarding their support of his candidacy for the post of Prime Minister. On 21 February 2010 President Yanukovych offered three candidates for the Prime Minister post: Tihipko, Our Ukraine faction member Arseniy Yatsenyuk and Party of Regions lawmaker Mykola Azarov. On 11 March 2010 Tihipko was elected as one of six deputy Prime Ministers (in charge of economic issues) in the Azarov Government. This cabinet was reshuffled in December 2010; according to Deputy Head of the Situations Modelling Agency Oleksiy Holobutsky this resulted in Tihipko being responsible for all unpopular reforms. He was appointed Vice Prime Minister of Ukraine – Minister of social policy of Ukraine.

In August 2011, Tihipko and Prime Minister (and a Party of Regions leader), Mykola Azarov, announced that Strong Ukraine and Party of Regions were going to team up and eventually Strong Ukraine would be merged into POR. Tihipko stated (in October 2011) he would become a Party of Regions member after the negotiations between the parties were concluded. The two parties merged on 17 March 2012. The same day, Tihipko was unanimously elected Party of Regions deputy chairman and member of the Party of Regions political council. In the 2012 parliamentary election he was (re)-elected into parliament on the party list of Party of Regions. Tihipko did not return to a ministerial post after and hinted (in December 2012) that he would mainly deal with the ideology of Party of Regions since. He was one of the 36 members of the Party of regions faction (who consisted of 96 deputies) who voted in favour of the impeachment of President Viktor Yanukovych in February 2014.

=== Ukrainian presidential election, 2014 ===
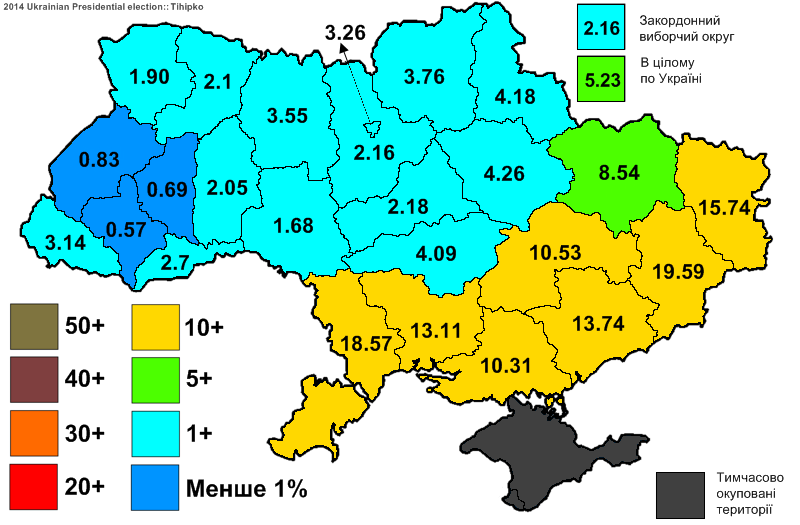
Serhiy Tihipko (first round) – percentage of vote

Tihipko was a self-nominated candidate for President of Ukraine in the 2014 presidential election. Of the 23 presidential candidates, Tihipko has declared the highest income to the Ukrainian election Committee. He had an income of about ₴263 million in 2013. According to the first poll published after Vitali Klitschko withdrew from the presidential race, as of 31 March Tihipko was running second at 17.9%, behind Petro Poroshenko (38.3%).

On 29 March a Party of Regions convention supported Mykhailo Dobkin's nomination as a presidential candidate. On 7 April 2014 the political council of the party expelled Tihipko from the party. He then accused that the party had "been turned into a branch of a specific financial and industrial group, a private enterprise".

On 23 April 2014 Tihipko announced that the Strong Ukraine party would be re-established and that its 2012 merger with Party of Regions had been "a mistake". On 5 August 2014 he was re-elected party leader of Strong Ukraine.

In the 2014 Ukrainian presidential election, he received 5.23% of the vote, ranking 5th among all candidates. He did do better than Dobkin, who gained 3.03%.

=== Career after the 2014 presidential election ===
In the 2014 Ukrainian parliamentary election Tihipko headed the national list of Strong Ukraine. But he was not elected into parliament because the party won one constituency parliamentary seat (only). In May 2026, he became a freelance adviser to Kyrylo Budanov, who has been serving as Head of the Office of the President of Ukraine.

== Banking 2015 onwards ==
Early May 2015, Tihipko was appointed head of the supervisory council of TAScombank, part of TAS-Group, in which he holds the largest stake of nearly 49%.

Tihipko bought a controlling stake (99.9230%) in Russian state-owned Sberbank's Ukrainian subsidiary in December 2017. He then merged this subsidiary with TAScombank without shutting down the financial institutions' branches.

== Political positions ==
“European integration remains the main European course for us”

— Tihipko on 21 December 2012 on Inter

In the buildup to the 2010 Ukrainian presidential election, Tihipko stated that Ukraine should conduct the most constructive policy possible in relations with neighboring countries, including both Russia and the West. In September 2009 he wrote an article that was published in the Ukrainian edition of Komsomolskaya Pravda in which he criticized Ukraine's foreign policy over the past five years, saying its goal had been to "participate in a cordon sanitaire" around Russia, which has done "enormous economic damage" to Ukraine, weakened Ukraine's position in the post-Soviet realm, and turned Moscow into a "powerful opponent of Ukrainian interests." According to Tihipko (in January 2010) Ukraine is not yet ready to seek membership in the European Union or NATO and must first focus on forming a unified government that can stimulate the country's economy. In the long term he seeks European integration for Ukraine. In December 2012 Tihipko stated that European integration was more advantageous to Ukraine than accession to the Customs Union of Belarus, Kazakhstan and Russia.

Tihipko supports the legalization of prostitution in Ukraine. In November 2009, he stated, "...we should not be hypocrites. If certain things exist, we should speak about them openly and resolve [them] if necessary."

Tihipko supports the privatization of Ukraine's gas-pipeline system and its joint management by Russia and Europe, but warned that he would "not support the seizure of the pipeline" by Russia, which he believed the conditions (late 2009) were being set for. He was critical about the April 2010 natural gas agreement stating that while the deal might make economic sense "The procedure of debating the agreement and completing it behind closed doors is not what the Ukrainian people want."

Presidential candidate Tihipko intended to make Russian a second state language if he had won the 2014 Ukrainian presidential election. In the campaign he spoke out against the separatism of the pro-Russian armed groups in Eastern Ukraine and for decentralisation. In the campaign he advocated Ukraine's non-aligned status "if we now start talking more about NATO – it completely will split the country. He also called Russia "an aggressor which invaded Crimea". (Note: During the 2014 Crimean crisis, Ukraine lost control over Crimea, which was unilaterally annexed by Russia in March 2014. The status of Crimea and Sevastopol is currently under dispute by Ukraine and Russia; Ukraine and the majority of the international community consider Crimea an autonomous republic of Ukraine and Sevastopol one of Ukraine's cities with special status, while Russia, on the other hand, considers Crimea a federal subjects of Russia and Sevastopol one of its federal cities. The 2014 pro-Russian conflict in Ukraine created a separatist insurgency in the Donbas region of Eastern Ukraine (where several towns became under the control of armed pro-Russian forces) and insurgents declared several provinces unilateral independent.)

== Family and private life ==
Tihipko was married to Natalia Tihipko from 1981 to 2004. They had one daughter together, Anna, born in 1984; she now works in a company owned by her father.

Tihipko married Viktoriya Tigipko later in 2004, during the 2004 Ukrainian presidential election campaign. Viktoria is the President of the Odesa International Film Festival. She is also managing director at a venture company which invests in online projects worldwide, and is considered to be one of the most successful businesswomen in Ukraine. The couple have three children, born in 2002, 2005, and 2008.

== Notes ==
Party political offices
Preceded by Post created	Leader of Labour Ukraine; 2000–2005	Succeeded by Valeriy Konovalyuk
Preceded by Myhailo Syrota	Leader of Strong Ukraine; 2009–2012	Succeeded by None (party merged into Party of Regions)
