= Self-proclaimed =

Informal title given by the declarer

Self-proclaimed describes a designation that is recognized by the declaring person but not necessarily by any legal authority. It can be the status of a noble title or the status of a nation. The term is used informally for anyone declaring themselves to any informal title.

== Examples ==
- Micronations such as Sealand are small, self-proclaimed entities that claim to be independent sovereign states but which are not acknowledged by any recognized sovereign state.
- A self-proclaimed monarch such as Jean-Bédel Bokassa.
- Self-styled order, a chivalric order with unrecognised claim of historical legacy.

== Usage ==
Taking to her blog to blast Melissa Etheridge in poetic prose, the self-proclaimed 'Hollywood Farm Girl' said she was "blindsided" by the timing of the dissolution of their domestic partnership.

In March, officials said that Khalid Sheik Mohammed, the self-proclaimed mastermind of the attacks, probably would be tried before a military tribunal and that a decision appeared to be imminent.

== See also ==
- Pretender
- Self-declared state
