= Dmytro Dobkin =

Ukrainian politician

- Дмитро Добкін
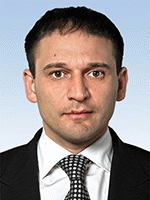

People's Deputy of Ukraine
- In office 12 December 2012 – 29 August 2019
- Preceded by: Constituency established
- Succeeded by: Oleksandr Litvinov
- Constituency: Kharkiv Oblast, No. 178

Member of the Kharkiv Oblast Council
- In office 2005 – 12 December 2012

Personal details
- Born: 8 January 1974 (age 52) Kharkiv, Ukrainian SSR, Soviet Union
- Party: Party of Regions; Opposition Bloc

Dmytro Markovych Dobkin (Ukrainian: Дмитро Маркович Добкін; born 8 January 1974) is a Ukrainian politician who served as a People's Deputy of Ukraine from 2012 to 2019, representing the Party of Regions and later the Opposition Bloc. He is a younger brother of politician Mykhailo Dobkin.

== Biography ==
Dobkin was born on 8 January 1974 in Kharkiv, which was located within the Ukrainian SSR at the time of his birth. After graduating from secondary school, he became an entrepreneur, working within the company "Progress-90" and then as the Director of Ukrtorginvest LLC and Nika LLC. In 2002, he graduated from the Kharkiv National University of Internal Affairs and received the qualification to be a lawyer. He then returned to his business work, becoming director of Orbita Plus LLC, until he was elected a deputy of the Kharkiv Oblast Council.

In 2005, Dobkin was elected a member of the 5th Kharkiv Oblast Council. He was re-elected in 2010. In the 2012 Ukrainian parliamentary election, Dobkin was elected a People's Deputy of Ukraine from the Party of Regions in Ukraine's 178th electoral district. According to the voting results, he won with 65.59% of the votes. He attempted to run again in the 2019 Ukrainian parliamentary election for the 9th convocation in the 178th electoral district, this time representing the Opposition Bloc, but lost the election with 16.43% of the vote to a candidate from the Servant of the People party.

After serving as an MP, he helped direct the agricultural companies that he and his brother Mykhailo owned, which in 2025 was consolidated into the parent company Avesterra Group. They later opened multiple poultry plants, including one in Volyn worth €60 million.

Although some outlets have characterized him as pro-Russian, Dobkin publicly supported Ukraine after the Russian invasion of Ukraine, including posting in support of the Ukrainian Armed Forces and assisting the Volodymyr Military Administration in Sumy.
