= Video of the production of Mykhailo Dobkin's campaign advertisement =

2007 Ukrainian political controversy

The YouTube video
- Original video (5m 10s; Russian transcript; version with English subtitles)

A still from the video, featuring Dobkin

On 27 September 2007, a video was published on YouTube that contained a montage of leaked takes made in December 2005 in preparation for an electoral campaign ad of Mykhailo Dobkin. Dobkin ("Dopa", Допа), the person in the video, was running for city mayor of Kharkiv, the second-largest city in Ukraine; while Hennadiy Kernes ("Gyepa", Гепа), then city council secretary and later mayor of the city, was directing the filming. The editor's identity behind the compilation is unknown. However, Rostyslav Kasianenko, then editor-in-chief of Gorodskoy dozor, a local news outlet close to Dobkin's campaign, alleged that the video appeared due to a rival candidate's revenge campaign. The journalist said that it was started because a Dobkin-aligned local TV station effectively ended his run for mayor due to airing negative coverage.

The duo's profanity-laden Russian-language dialogue went viral on social media. The next day, it reached the top 10 of the most popular YouTube videos of the day in the world, and has become a source for many quotes and memes circulated in the Russian internet community. A follow-up video of unclear origin which included fragments supposedly from the same production scene was published in January 2008.

== Leak ==
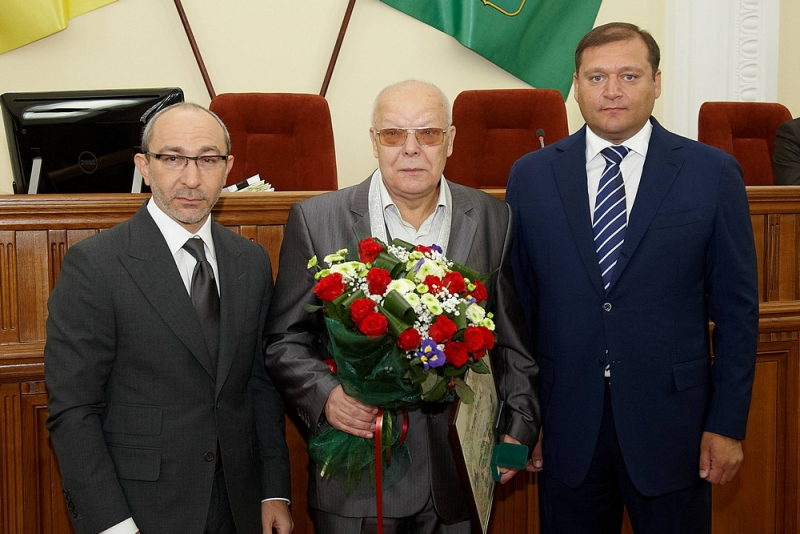
City council secretary and filming director Hennadiy Kernes (left) and mayoral candidate Mykhailo Dobkin (right) are the main figures in the video (here photographed in 2012)

Mykhailo Dobkin was running for the office of mayor of Kharkiv, the second-largest city in Ukraine. In December 2005, Dobkin and his assistant Hennadiy Kernes, then city council secretary, were recording a speech to inhabitants of the city. Meanwhile, Vladyslav Protas, a local businessman, was also running as a candidate. He was informally supported by the rival camp led by then-governor of Kharkiv Oblast, Arsen Avakov. According to a 2017 statement from Rostislav Kasianenko, then editor-in-chief of Gorodskoy dozor, a local news outlet close to the campaign, Protas did not pay his film editor, so the disgruntled employee went to the newspaper and leaked Protas's preparations leading to his address. The kompromat was then repeatedly aired on Channel 7, a local TV station then owned by Kernes and Avakov. This destroyed the businessman's campaign, and he vowed revenge. Dobkin, supported by the pro-Russian Party of Regions, won the election on 26 March 2006, easily defeating incumbent Volodymyr Shumilkin after the latter chose to go against the city's political trends and side with President Viktor Yushchenko's Our Ukraine party.

Kasianenko alleged that somebody agreed to download the uncut two-hour recording from the TV channel's servers and give it to Protas for $500, and this was distilled into the original video. The journalist then suggested that Protas paid about $80,000 for promotion of the story at various outlets. At the same time, Kernes himself started testing the leak on focus groups to see their reaction - which was apparently that of "sincere and innocent laughter".

On 27 September 2007, the cuts were leaked to several local TV stations, which broadcast the censored versions, and to YouTube, this time with the original soundtrack. This happened just three days before the snap election to the Verkhovna Rada, Ukraine's parliament.

== Contents ==
The video features several cuts of Dobkin trying to read a prepared speech in Russian, repeatedly struggling to do it properly and complaining about the quality of the speechwriting. He and Kernes, the main voice from behind the scenes, are shown to engage in a dialogue that contains ample profanity.

The YouTube video was published under a generic title "Mikhail Dobkin, mayor of the city of Kharkiv". The two protagonists later became known as "Gyepa and Dopa". The former was Kernes's prison moniker and coincidentally is a Ukrainian word meaning "buttocks", while the latter's nickname is close to Ukrainian дупа, a vulgar term for the same body part. Some video duplicates are thus known under the duo's nicknames.

Some excerpts from the dialogue, including with the immediate context, are shown in the table below. Citations are given for news outlets that noted the quotes.

English translation	Original speech
Kernes: Hey, where [should I pull] the tie? Towards you or away from me? Film crew: Towards me. Кernes: I can't do [it] because there's this fucking [microphone] cable!	— Куда галстук, скажи? К тебе или от меня? — Ко мне. — Я не могу сделать, потому что вот этот шнурок, блядь!
Kernes: Can you articulate this in the same tone, but also with the gestures of your face, just like you are able to do? This is just some fucking worthless bullshit. Let's start all over again. Let's go. Dobkin: Write proper texts then! You're writing some horseshit.	— Ты можешь сказать это с выражением в одном тоне, только с мимикой твоего лица, как ты это умеешь делать? Ну это просто постная хуйня какая-то, блядь. Давайте по-новой. Поехали. — Тексты пишите нормальные! Пишете херню какую-то.
Kernes: [Start] from the beginning, Misha, (Note: Diminutive of Mikhail, or Mykhailo in Ukrainian) you're not vivid! Because you are speaking about the agenda, breathe life... into yourself and breathe life into the agenda! Dobkin: Alright, alright, enough! Kernes: Misha, don't fucking act up, I'm honest with you.	— С самого начала, Миша, нету жизни! Потому что ты говоришь о программе, оживи... себя и оживи программу! — Ну всё, всё, хватит! — Миша, не выёбывайся, я тебе честно говорю.
Dobkin: "The health of the residents of Kharkiv is the main treasure of our city." Kernes: Where is the healthcare [gone]? "We created this agenda..." Dobkin: So what? I have to speak about the agenda in every single video?! Kernes: Of course! Where are the fucking ambulances?!	— «Здоровье харьковчан – главное богатство нашего города. » — А где про медицину? «Эту программу мы создавали… » — Так что? На каждый ролик говорить про эту программу?! — Конечно! Где про скорые помощи, блядь?!
Dobkin: "[...] We will regain the trust of the residents of Kharkiv and we will provide high-quality maintenance to housing." (pauses after reading the speech, champs) Let's do it again. Kernes: Fuck, [why] did you say "housing" and started fucking slurping?! How the fuck do you know if [the shot] was OK?! Dobkin: Gyesh... (Note: Diminutive of Gyennadiy, or Hennadiy in Ukrainian); Kernes: Can you wait for a second? Dobkin: (speaking over Kernes) Gyesh, I can't see you, you are babbling from somewhere like a parrot!	— «Мы вернем доверие харьковчан и будем качественно обслуживать жилые дома.» ... Давай сначала. — Блядь, шо ты сказал «жилые дома» и начал чвякать-хуякать, бля?! Откуда ты знаешь, получилось или нет, блядь?! — Геш... — Можешь секунду подождать? — Ну Геш, я тебя не вижу, ты как попугай откуда-то вещаешь!
Dobkin: The text is written in a slightly moronic way. Kernes: Misha, we are rewriting everything. You have a dull face. Nobody will give you money.	— Немножко текст по-дэбильному [sic] написан. — Миша, всё переписываем. У тебя скучное лицо. Тебе никто денег не даст.
Kernes: Misha, tell me this - why are you being such a smartass? Read the stuff they gave you, just articulate it, and that's fucking it. Excuse me, what's your job here... Come on!	— Миша, скажи, чё ты такой умный? Ты читай то, шо тебе дали, только с выражением, и всё, блядь. Твоя задача здесь, извини... Давай!
Dobkin: "The city budget will get much more money, and these funds will work for the benefit of the city and all residents of Kharkiv." Кernes: Let's do [it] again, Misha, everything's shit.	— «В городской бюджет поступит значительно больше денег, и эти средства будут работать на благо города и всех харьковчан.» — Давай по новой, Миша, всё хуйня.
Kernes: Everything's fine, but [you have] angry... You have an angry (Note: While in the context, Kernes probably meant to use злой as "angry", its primary meaning is more akin to English "evil", "wicked", "malevolent"; therefore the phrase sounds differently when quoted out of context) mouth, you are baring your teeth.	— Всё хорошо, только злые... рот у тебя злой, зубы скалишь.

== Reactions ==
The video became an instant hit in the Runet-adjacent world and went viral. On 28 September, it reached eighth place in the ranking of most YouTube video views on that day in the world, at over 100,000 views, and reportedly stayed there at least until 6 October. As of February 2026, the original video reached 8.5 million views, not counting any duplicates or remakes. Dobkin's and Kernes's public profile rose so much it arguably could compete with the prominence of leaders from the Commonwealth of Independent States. The BBC, citing a Ukrainian blogger, attributed the "epic" character of the video not only to the vulgar catchphrases but also to the appearance that Dobkin had a bleak understanding of what the speech was about and to his terrible reading even after being coached.

The video spawned numerous parodies imitating the dialogue, including in settings like a Mortal Kombat-styled battle. The dialogue was also emulated in Election Day 2, a Russian satirical comedy published in 2016. In spring 2011, Hennadiy Minaiev, the mayor of Sumy, was explicitly comparing the YouTube popularity of his gaffe (Note: During a city council meeting, instead of saying the standard Ukrainian "підпис тут", he uttered "підпис здесь" in surzhyk, which had a comic effect due to the association with the obscene word пиздець) against that of Dobkin's, arguing that his popularity metrics are better.

The Party of Regions' campaign director, Borys Kolesnikov, assured at the time of publication that while he was laughing at the video, he would not change his mind about the leadership in Kharkiv.

=== From protagonists ===
Shortly after the interview's publication, Kernes implied that the video was doctored, accused the leakers of trying to destroy the relationship between him and Dobkin and estimated the sale price for the leak at $60,000. However, Kernes later fully embraced the fame. In a 2013 interview with Dmitry Gordon, he recalled that he saw the video before Dobkin and was not agitated upon seeing it, and that he advised Dobkin that "politics starts from scandal; [and there he has] a scandal." He thought that the controversial fame was actually to Dobkin's benefit. When asked if the authors of the "moronic" texts were punished, Kernes disagreed with Dobkin's characterization. The politician repeatedly insisted that there was nothing wrong with the style of communication. Kernes said that his favorite quote from the video, which he "knew by heart", was that about the "dull face". That said, Kernes privately suggested that there was no profit from the video, just the "pain in the ass". (Note: Quote from the original: Разговор круто меняет направление и происходит в уничижительной для Геннадия Адольфовича форме – обсуждается тема передачи авторских прав на знаменитый «предвыборный ролик» Кернеса и Добкина Игорю Коломойскому. [Игорь Коломойский]: У нас тут идея возникла. Ты должен подписать бумажку одну. [Геннадий Кернес]: Какую? И.К. Что 75% доходов от вашего клипа – наши. 25 – твои. Г.К. А какой доход от этого клипа? От этого клипа только геморрой…) During a supposed leaked phone conversation with oligarch Ihor Kolomoyskyi, Kernes was badgered with requests to sign a profit-sharing agreement. The oligarch asked for copyright of the video and 75% of the future profits. The mayor of Kharkiv repeatedly dodged the questions before ultimately declining.

Dobkin admitted that his attitude to the video varied from "anger to fully positive relationship" and that he used to rewatch it often, but as of 2017 he no longer does. In 2011, Dobkin said that "well, we laughed a month or two but what's the result? Where are we [Dobkin and Kernes] (Note: At the time, Dobkin served as appointed governor of Kharkiv Oblast while Kernes was elected mayor of Kharkiv, in which position he served until his death in 2020) and where are those who made it [the video]?". The next year, Russian director Nikita Mikhalkov used the incident in his documentary about political philosopher Ivan Ilyin to convince viewers that holding elections in Russia is harmful because, he argued, there was no other way that Russian politicians were elected and that elections did not prevent "Mishas with his PR-men" from getting to power. Dobkin was reportedly offended by the comparison. He wrote back that he was "not expecting that [Mikhalkov] rated [Dobkin's] humble ability to change the choices of [Russian] compatriots so highly".

== See also ==
- Őszöd speech - a leaked vulgar speech of Hungarian Prime Minister Ferenc Gyurcsány, delivered at a closed party meeting
- Hot mic - often profane utterings heard because the microphone was accidentally left on
