= Party of Christian Socialists =

Party of Christian Socialists Партія "Xристиянські соціалісти"
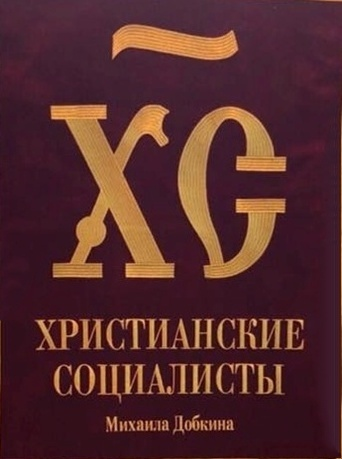
- Chairman: Arthur Martin
- Founder: Mykhailo Dobkin
- Founded: 15 February 2018
- Split from: Opposition Bloc
- Headquarters: Kyiv
- Ideology: Christian socialism Christian left Russophilia; Euroscepticism
- Political position: Left-wing
- Religion: Russian Orthodoxy
- National affiliation: Opposition Bloc (2019)
- Colours: Red; Gold
- Verkhovna Rada: 0 / 450

The Party of Christian Socialists (Ukrainian: Партія "Християнських соціалістів", romanized: Partiia "Khrystyianskykh sotsialistiv" or Russian: Партия "Христианских социалистов", romanized: Partiya "Khristianskikh sotsialistov") is a Ukrainian Christian socialist party which was founded on February 15, 2018. The party was created when their founder Mykhailo Dobkin left the Opposition Bloc. In the 2019 Ukrainian parliamentary election party members took part on the election list of Opposition Bloc (a party founded in 2019). In the 2019 election this party won 6 single-seat constituencies and its nationwide list won 3.23% of the votes, meaning it did not overcome the 5% election barrier.

Mykhailo Dobkin, the founder of the party, is known for its pro-Yanukovych and pro-Russian attitude. He supported the creation of the Kharkov People's Republic, and became the co-chair of the separatist Congress of Deputies of the Southeastern Regions of Ukraine, the Crimea and Sevastopol which was held in Kharkov. Dobkin staunchly opposed Euromaidan and posed in the uniform of Berkut, Ukrainian special police force infamous for violent measures it took against the protesters. He denounced Euromaidan protesters as "freaks" and "clowns", expressing outrage about the demolition of monuments to Vladimir Lenin. After he left the Opposition Bloc in favor of creating the Party of Christian Socialists, he doubled down on his stances, stating: "I became a bigger opponent of Maidan than I was in 2013 and 2014. I would support Berkut more today than I did then."

The party is considered to be Russophilic, as one of the issues Christian Socialists campaign on is protection of the Russian language in Ukraine. However, the leader of the party, Mykhailo Dobkin, despite being suspected of backing Donbas separatists in 2014, stated in response to the invasion: "Much of what I believed in collapsed overnight... just burned out. May this war be damned." At the same time, the party postulates resuming full-scale relations with Russia, restoring the status of Russian language in Ukraine, creating a "humanitarian space" with Russia, joining the Customs Union of the Eurasian Economic Union, and federalization of Ukraine.

== Ideology ==
The party openly identifies as Christian socialist, and emphasizes that it sees Christian socialism as a natural part of Christian teaching, differentiating itself from "socialists whose origin traces back to communists". According to the party leader, "Christian orientation will be returning to our lives such specific human values as family, respect, relationships between people, everything without which one cannot do both in politics and in ordinary life". The party "combines a socialist economic model and traditional Christian ethics". It has been described as religious, and it wishes to appeal to former communist voters. The party sees the fallen Soviet Union positively and presents the Soviet flag, as well as the Ribbon of Saint George to express support for Russia.

The Party of Christian Socialists is also regionalist and has localist roots, as the original name of the party was briefly "Bloc of Local Communities", before being changed to directly reference Christian socialism. The leader of the party, Mykhailo Dobkin, stated that Christian Socialists is a "regional project" that will emphasize regional issues, regionalism, and promote regionalist cultures. The party espouses a golden-colored logo, stylized in an Old Church Slavonic font, which displays the Easter greeting "Christ is Risen!"

Despite highlighting that it represents a different kind of socialism from the Soviet one, Christian Socialists nevertheless advertise Soviet nostalgia. Ukrainian political scientists Taras Kuzio, Sergei Zhuk and Paul D'Anieri outline that the party follows the patterns of pro-Soviet patterns in Ukraine, such as socialist/left-wing identification, advocating for radical wealth redistribution, promoting Russian culture and praising the achievements of the Soviet Union. The party opposes decommunisation policies and sees the Soviet legacy of Ukraine as something that must not be rejected but embraced, and that the new, Christian form of socialism in Ukraine should learn from both the perceived achievements and failures of the Soviet Union. The leader of the party paid tribute to Soviet soldiers at the Soviet War Memorial in Berlin with a Soviet flag and Saint George's ribbon. When warned that Soviet flag is banned in Ukraine and he might suffer legal consequences, he stated: "I don't care at all."

The party argues that decommunisation and lustration discriminate against "half of the population of Ukraine", and accused such anti-communist policies of depriving people of jobs. The party also finds it necessary to cancel language laws that limit the usage of the Russian language in Ukraine. Christian Socialists stated that they will "sew Ukraine back together" and argue that many of the problems of Ukraine can be traced back to the infiltration of Ukraine by the US and its influence. Dobkin also stated that the Orange Revolution and the Euromaidan weakened Ukraine, and opened it up to 'exploitation' by the West.

Seen as pro-Russian, the party put an emphasis on protection of the Russian language, and stated its support for the Russian Orthodox Church in Ukraine. In March 2022, given the damage to Kharkov, Dobkin declared that "Much of what I believed in collapsed overnight... just burned out." In April 2022, Dobkin became a deacon of the Ukrainian Orthodox Church of the Moscow Patriarchate.

The party remains opposed to Ukrainian membership in the European Union and NATO, and condemns the Euromaidan protests. Together with the Orange Revolution, the party considers Euromaidan a US-backed putsch that exposed Ukraine to Western dominance. It seeks to fully restore friendly relations with Russia, join the Customs Union of the Eurasian Economic Union, create a "humanitarian space" with Russia, and to restore the status of the Russian language in Ukraine. The party also postulates a federalization of Ukraine, and argues that the post-Euromaidan Ukrainian government is to blame for the Russian annexation of Crimea. Christian Socialists also called the War in Donbas a "civil war"; the party condemned the 2020–2021 Belarusian protests and stated its support for President of Belarus Alexander Lukashenko.
