= Mykhailo Dobkin =

Ukrainian politician (born 1970)

- Михайло Добкін
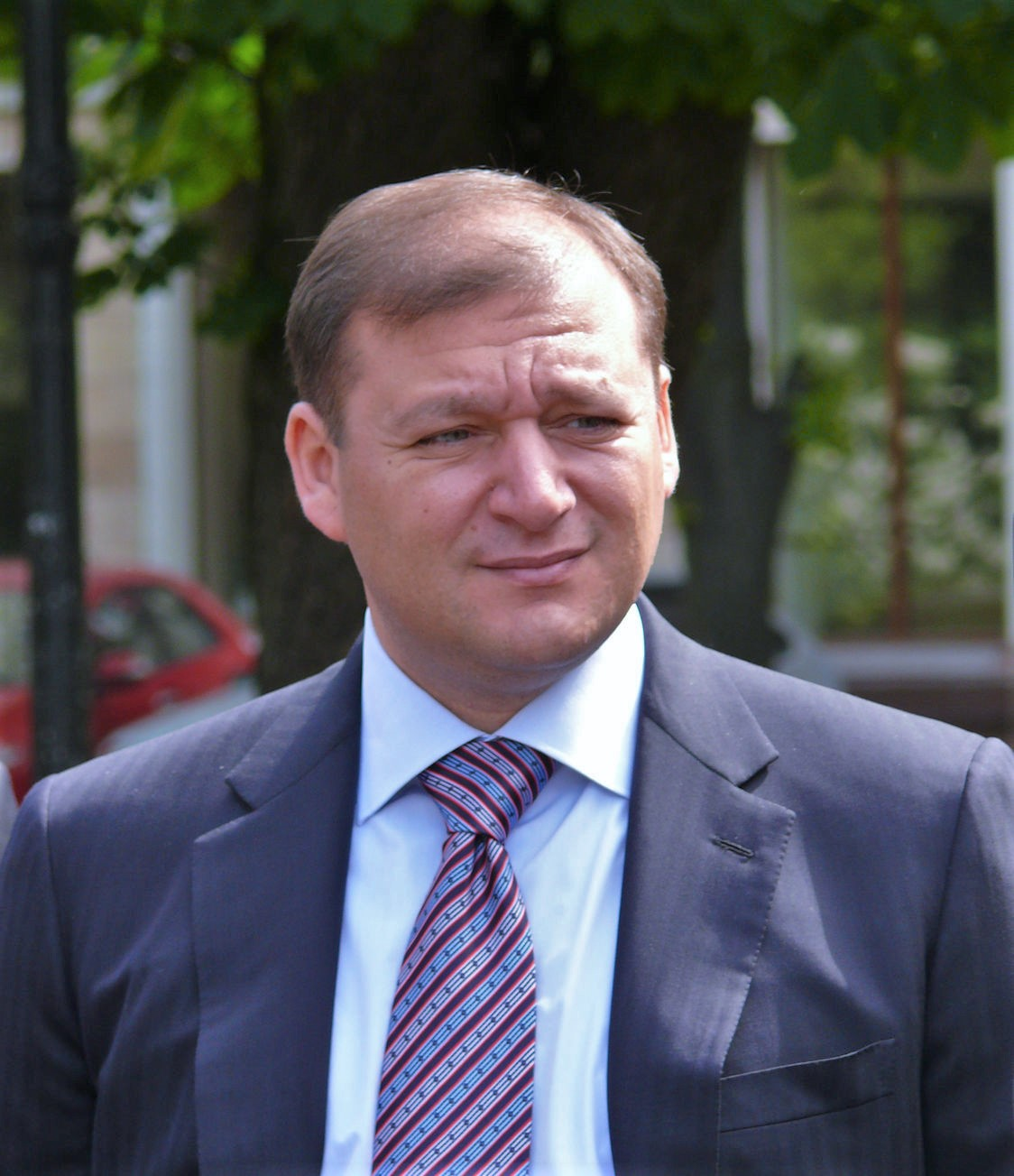
- Dobkin in 2008

People's Deputy of Ukraine
- In office 27 November 2014 – 29 August 2019
- Constituency: Opposition Bloc, No. 3
- In office 14 May 2002 – 25 May 2006
- Constituency: Kharkiv Oblast, No. 174

Governor of Kharkiv Oblast
- In office 10 March 2010 – 2 March 2014
- President: Viktor Yanukovych
- Preceded by: Volodymyr Babayev (acting)
- Succeeded by: Ihor Baluta

4th Mayor of Kharkiv
- In office 26 March 2006 – 10 March 2010
- Preceded by: Volodymyr Shumilkin
- Succeeded by: Hennadiy Kernes

Personal details
- Born: 26 January 1970 (age 56) Kharkiv, Ukrainian SSR, Soviet Union
- Party: Party of Christian Socialists
- Other political affiliations: For United Ukraine! (2002); Democratic Initiatives (2002–2004); SDPU(o) (2004–2005); Party of Regions (2005–2014); Opposition Bloc (2014–2017)
- Spouse: Alina Bozhenko
- Children: 4
- Education: Kharkiv National University of Internal Affairs (JD); Kharkiv National University of Economics (MS)
- Profession: Lawyer, Economist
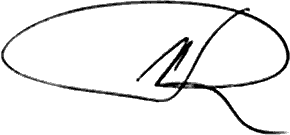
- Signature
- Website: Telegram

Mykhailo Markovych Dobkin (Note: Ukrainian: Михайло Маркович Добкін Russian: Михаил Маркович Добкин, romanized: Mikhail Markovich Dobkin) (born 26 January 1970) is a Ukrainian politician, former governor of Kharkiv Oblast, former mayor of Kharkiv, and a former deputy of the Ukrainian parliament.

Since 2022, he has served as a deacon of the Ukrainian Orthodox Church (Moscow Patriarchate).

== Early life and career ==
Mykhailo Dobkin was born to a Jewish father and Ukrainian mother in Kharkiv. He graduated from the Kharkiv National University of Internal Affairs with a degree in law and the Kharkiv National University of Economics, majoring in international economics.

From 1993 until 2002, Dobkin was an entrepreneur and director of several businesses. In his 2015 tax declaration, Dobkin stated that he owned 12 vehicles.

== People's Deputy of Ukraine (2002–2006) ==
In the 2002 Ukrainian parliamentary election, Dobkin was elected as People's Deputy of Ukraine. Dobkin changed his political party several times while serving as a People's Deputy, going from For United Ukraine! to the Democratic Initiatives group less than a year after his election. Two years later, Dobkin again switched his party to the Social Democratic Party of Ukraine (united), and the year afterwards joined the Party of Regions, where he remained until the Verkhovna Rada was dissolved for the 2006 Ukrainian parliamentary election. From late 2005, Dobkin was a member of the political council of the Party of Regions.

== Mayor of Kharkiv (2006–2010) ==
From March 2006 to March 2010, Dobkin was Mayor of Kharkiv. In office, Dobkin was close to Hennadiy Kernes, who exerted unofficial power upon Dobkin.

=== Election video scandal ===
On September 27, 2007, a video recording how Dobkin’s election speech was prepared in December 2005 was posted on YouTube. A video containing profanity by Hennadiy Kernes was also shown on television. The authenticity of this recording is controversial. Dobkin himself called this video "partially edited". On the first day, the video on YouTube was viewed by about 120 thousand people, and in total, as of June 2020, there were more than 6.1 million views. The video spawned a huge number of Internet memes in the Russian-speaking segment of the Internet.

== Governor of Kharkiv Oblast (2010–2014) ==
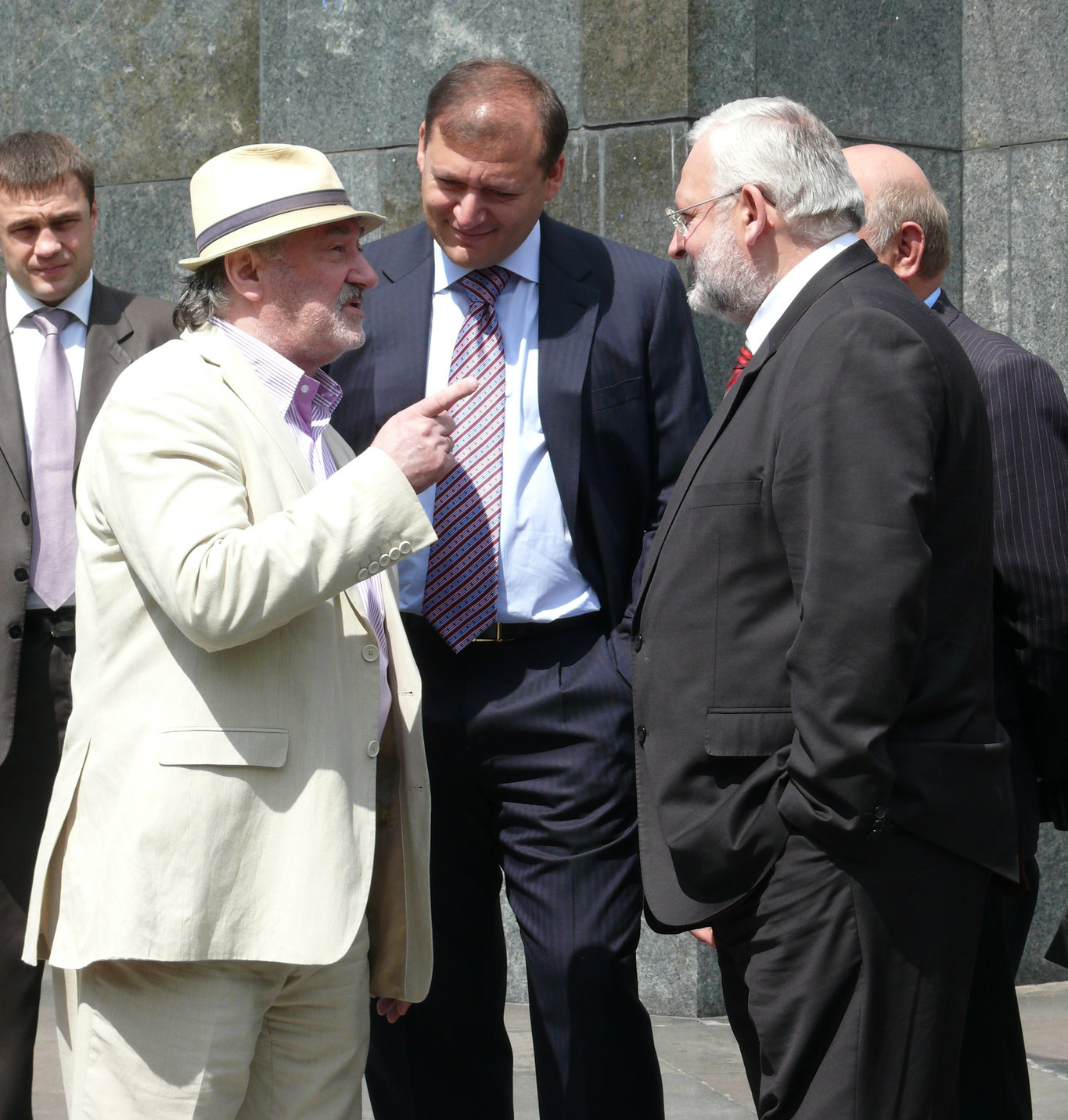
Mykhailo Dobkin with Ukrainian actor Bohdan Stupka

In March 2010, President Viktor Yanukovych appointed Dobkin as Governor of Kharkiv Oblast.

In 2014, amidst Euromaidan, Dobkin formed the Ukrainian Front, an organisation in support of Yanukovych. Dobkin furthermore stated his intention to "clean and purify our Ukrainian land of those who come here with plans for occupation". In February 2014, Dobkin called for Ukraine’s capital to be moved from Kyiv to Kharkiv, and for a federal structure of government to be established in Ukraine. He also claimed that by late February 2014, "all peaceful protesters of Euromaidan had left" and that "Negotiations with [remaining protesters] will be to no avail. They need to disarm, and those who resist and kill people physically destroyed."

=== Revolution of Dignity and 2014 pro-Russian unrest ===
Following the Revolution of Dignity, Dobkin was a leading participant of local officials in Eastern Ukraine, which questioned the legality of the new government's actions and declared local officials would take responsibility for their own oblasts until order was restored. Dobkin was later reported to have fled to Russia, along with Kharkiv mayor Hennadiy Kernes, but he returned to attend a pro-Russian rally in the city.

In late February 2014, he indicated that he intended to run for president in the upcoming Ukrainian presidential election due to his concerns regarding the behaviour of the revolutionary government towards the Russophone population. Dobkin tendered his resignation as governor on 26 February 2014, "following [a] decision to run for the office of the President of Ukraine". On 2 March 2014, a decree by acting President Oleksandr Turchynov formally dismissed Dobkin as governor. On 10 March 2014, Dobkin was arrested on charges of leading a separatist movement. However, on 20 August 2014, Dobkin's criminal case was closed "in the absence of corpus delicti".

== 2014 presidential campaign ==
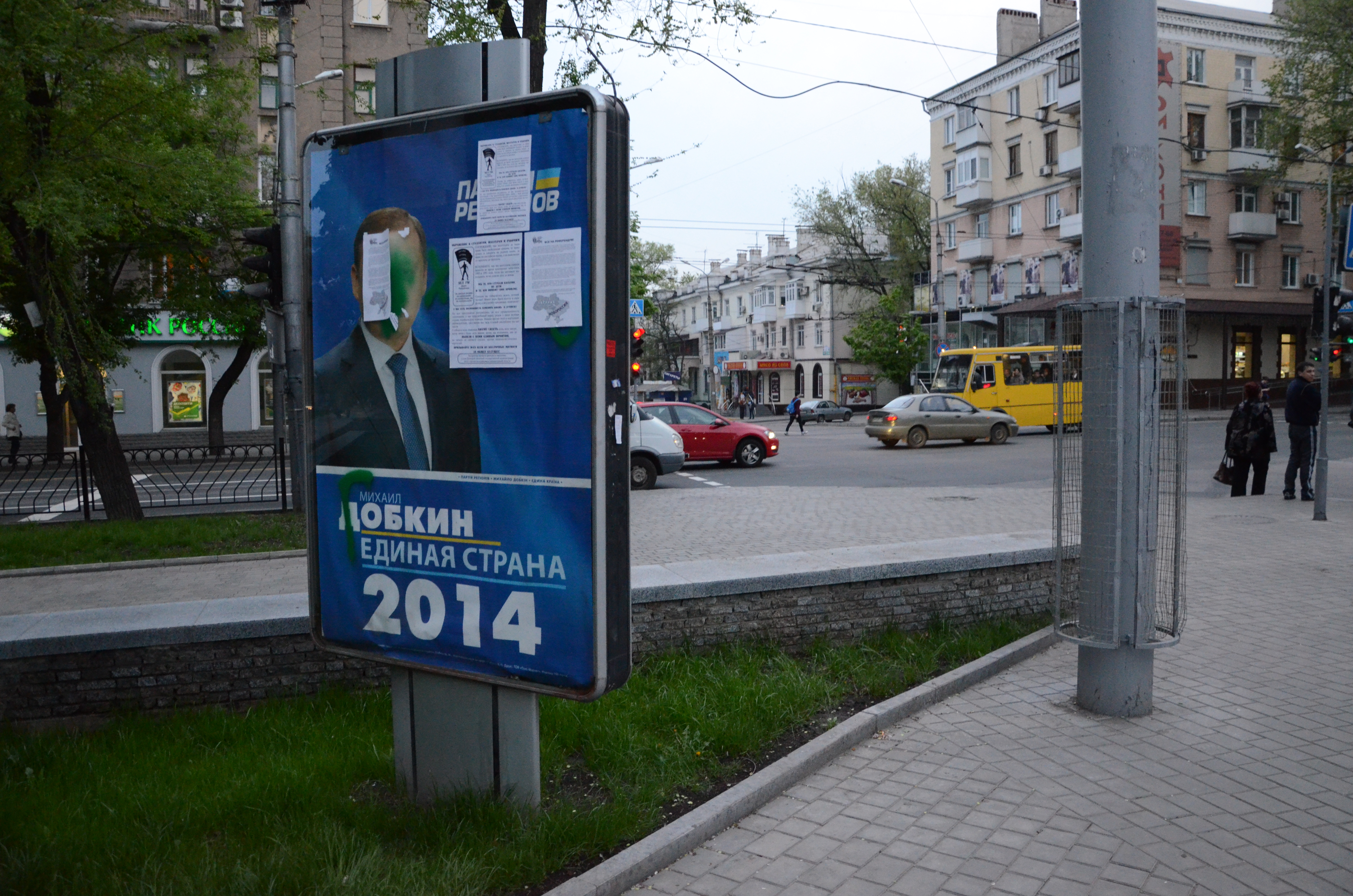
Billboard of Mykhailo Dobkin during the protests in Donetsk

On 25 March 2014, Dobkin filed documents to the Central Election Commission to run in the 2014 Ukrainian presidential election. On 29 March, a Party of Regions convention supported Dobkin's nomination as a presidential candidate.

During his presidential campaign, Dobkin advocated for regionalism and the establishment of a federal Ukraine, Ukraine joining the Eurasian Customs Union, improving Russia–Ukraine relations, "defending the joint Russian-Ukrainian history, culture and traditions", maintaining Ukrainian neutrality, tax relief in the agricultural sector over the next 15 years, and the abolition of conscription.

In the presidential election, Dobkin received 3.03% of the vote, ranking 6th among all candidates, and performed well in eastern Ukraine, receiving 26.25% of the vote in Kharkiv Oblast and 8.02% of the vote in neighbouring Luhansk Oblast.

== Return to parliamentary politics ==
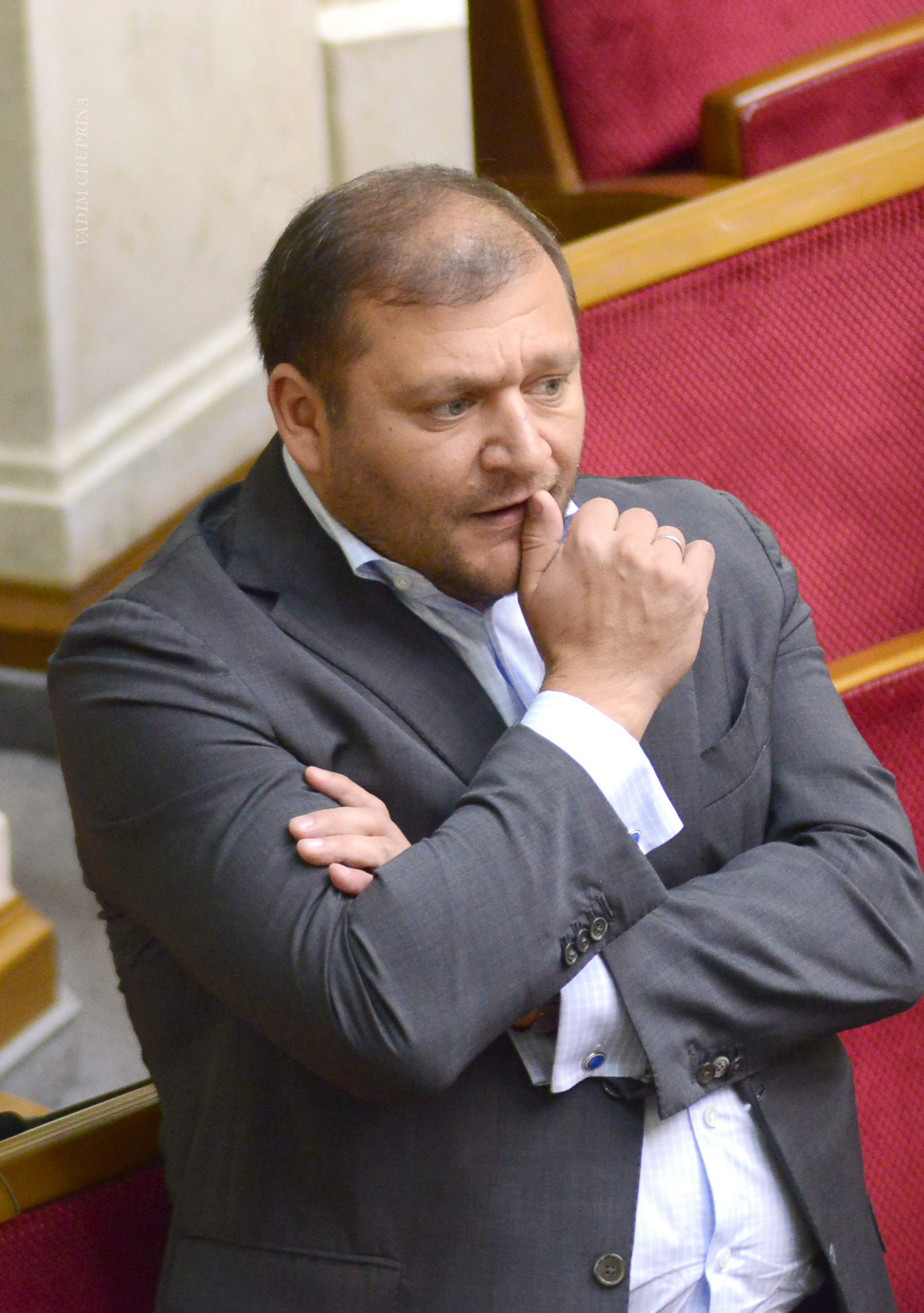
Mykhailo Dobkin in the Verkhovna Rada of Ukraine

In the 2014 Ukrainian parliamentary election, Dobkin was again re-elected into the Verkhovna Rada, this time as third on the party list for Opposition Bloc.

On 13 July 2017, the Verkhovna Rada stripped Dobkin of his parliamentary immunity. Dobkin was subsequently arrested on suspicions of abuse of office and assistance to fraud in order to obtain 78 hectares of land in Kharkiv worth more than US$8.5 million. Two days later, a Kyiv court ruled that Dobkin was to remain in custody until 14 September 2017, and granted bail at ₴50 million. On 19 July, members of the Opposition Bloc posted his bail.

Dobkin left Opposition Bloc in October 2017, voicing his disapproval of the party's support for judicial reform efforts. In February 2018, he founded his own party, the Party of Christian Socialists, and in June 2019 joined Opposition Bloc (2019), along with the rest of his party. In the 2019 Ukrainian parliamentary election, Dobkin unsuccessfully ran as a candidate on the party list, with the party failing to cross the 5% election barrier.

== 2020 and 2021 Kharkiv mayoral elections ==
Although in July 2020 Dobkin had announced his candidacy for Mayor of Kyiv in the 2020 Kyiv local elections, he stated in September 2020 that he had submitted documents for registration as a candidate for Mayor of Kharkiv. On 4 October 2020, 11 days prior to the election, he withdrew his candidacy in favour of incumbent mayor Hennadiy Kernes, his political ally and successor.

Kernes died on 17 December 2020 from complications of COVID-19. A snap mayoral election in Kharkiv was set on 31 October 2021 to determinate Kernes' successor. In this election, Dobkin was once again a mayoral candidate. On 29 September 2021, Opposition Platform — For Life announced it supported Dobkin in the mayoral election. The election commission declared Ihor Terekhov the winner of the election with 50.66% of the votes. Dobkin finished the race in second place with 28.4% of the vote.

== 2022 Russian invasion of Ukraine ==
Dobkin condemned the 2022 Russian invasion of Ukraine on its second day. On 17 March 2022, Dobkin posted a video of President Volodymyr Zelenskyy on his Instagram page, and signed it with the comment "[He is] ours".

Dobkin graduated from the Kharkiv Theological Seminary (UOC-MP), and on April 7, 2022, in the Kharkiv Annunciation Cathedral, Metropolitan Onufry of Kharkiv and Bohodukhiv ordained him to the rank of deacon.

In June, Igor Girkin (Strelkov) said that a month before the start of the 2022 Russian invasion of Ukraine, the 5th service of the FSB was negotiating with Dobkin about the possibility of creating the so-called "Kharkov People’s Republic" in the Kharkiv Oblast.

== Personal life ==
Dobkin is married and has four children; a son and three daughters.

Since first meeting Hennadiy Kernes in 1998, Dobkin was his close friend and political ally, and was succeeded by him as Mayor of Kharkiv in 2010. Kernes remained as mayor until his death in 2020.

Dobkin's younger brother, Dmytro Dobkin, was elected as a People's Deputy of Ukraine in the 2012 Ukrainian parliamentary election for the Party of Regions, being re-elected in 2014 as a member of Opposition Bloc. In the 2019 Ukrainian parliamentary election, Dmytro Dobkin failed to be re-elected.

Dobkin is widely known by the nickname "Dopa".

In 2022, Dobkin became a Deacon in the Ukrainian Orthodox Church.

== In the media ==
A behind-the-scenes video of Mykhailo Dobkin rehearsing a campaign address to the residents of Kharkiv, featuring profanity-laced commentary from Hennadiy Kernes, gained widespread popularity and went viral on the Internet. In 2008, Volodymyr Zelenskyy (then of Studio Kvartal 95) performed a parody of Dobkin's speeches, and later introduced another sketch mocking Dobkin's English language skills. In 2009, a parody was released by Andriy Molochnyi and Anton Lirnyk of Comedy Club Ukraine, while the Ukrainian version of the show Bolshaya Raznitsa (Big Difference) produced a satirical take on Dobkin's New Year's address to Kharkiv residents in a similar style.

== Awards ==
- Order of Merit, 1st class (5 July 2012) – "for significant personal contribution to the preparation and hosting of the final tournament of the UEFA Euro 2012 in Ukraine, successful implementation of infrastructure projects, ensuring law and order and public safety during the tournament, increasing the international prestige of the Ukrainian state, and high professionalism."
- Order of Merit, 2nd class (23 August 2011) – "for significant personal contribution to the establishment of Ukraine's independence, the assertion of its sovereignty and international prestige, merits in state-building, socio-economic, scientific, technical, cultural, and educational activities, and conscientious and flawless service to the Ukrainian people."
- Order of Merit, 3rd class
- Order of Friendship (Russia, 29 October 2010) – "for great contribution to the development and strengthening of friendship and cooperation relations between the Russian Federation and Ukraine."
- Order of Saint Vladimir Equal-to-the-Apostles of the Ukrainian Orthodox Church (Moscow Patriarchate)
- Order of Saint Dimitry of Rostov of the Ukrainian Orthodox Church (Moscow Patriarchate) (2010)
- Honorary Diploma of the Cabinet of Ministers of Ukraine (26 December 2003) – "for significant personal contribution to the formation of a system of effective and politically responsible government and the implementation of socio-economic reforms."
- Honorary Citizen of Kharkiv (since May 2013)
- "Veten Evlady" ("Son of the Fatherland") Gold Medal (2010, awarded by the World of Azerbaijan international magazine and the Dede Gorgud National Foundation) – "for significant personal contribution to the development and strengthening of friendship and cooperation between Azerbaijan and the Kharkiv Oblast at the regional level, and for the sake of peace on Earth."
- Dede Gorgud National Charity Foundation Award (2010, awarded by the World of Azerbaijan international magazine and the Dede Gorgud National Foundation)

== See also ==
- List of mayors of Kharkiv

== Notes ==
Political offices
Preceded by Volodymyr Babayev (acting)	Governor of Kharkiv Oblast; 2010–2014	Succeeded by Ihor Baluta
