= KPR (disambiguation) =

KPR is a photosensitive material used in photoengraving, photogravure and photolithography.

KPR or kpr may also refer to:

- Kelowna Pacific Railway, a defunct Canadian railroad
- Kentucky Public Radio, a consortium of four public radio stations
- Kenya Police Reserve, a Kenyan law enforcement agency
- KPR, the IATA and FAA LID code for Port Williams Seaplane Base, Alaska, United States
- KPR, the station code for Khanpur railway station, Punjab, Pakistan
- KPR, the station code for Kopperå Station, Trøndelag, Norway
- kpr, the ISO 639-3 code for Korafe-Yegha language, Papua New Guinea
- Kharkov People's Republic, a short-lived Pro-Russian separatist state situated in Kharkiv
