= State Prize of Ukraine in the Field of Architecture =

Ukrainian state award

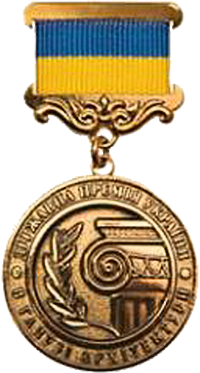
State Prize of Ukraine in the Field of Architecture

The State Prize of Ukraine in the Field of Architecture is a state award of Ukraine established to honor the creation of outstanding residential, civil and industrial architectural complexes, buildings and structures, work in the field of urban planning, landscape architecture, restoration of architectural monuments and architecture, and scientific works on the theory and history of architecture, which are important for the further development of national architecture and urban planning and have gained wide public recognition.

== Laureates ==
- Volodymyr Babayev
- Heorhiy Kirpa
- Anatoliy Kukoba
- Vladimir Konstantinov
- Oleksandr Lukyanchenko
- Oleksandr Omelchenko
- Viktor Ostapchuk
- Vasyl Semeniuk
- Volodymyr Shcherban
- Valery Shmukler
- Volodymyr Stelmakh
- Ihor Surkis
- Victor Vechersky

== See also ==
- List of Ukrainian State Prizes
