= Valery Shmukler =

Ukrainian engineer (1946–2023)

- Валерій Шмуклер
- Born: 26 June 1946; Krasnoyarsk, Russian SFSR, USSR
- Died: 3 November 2023 (aged 77)
- Education: Kharkiv State Technical University of Construction and Architecture
- Known for: A specialist in the creation of new structural systems, information technology for calculating and design of structures, optimization, and management of the structural characteristics of components and systems, Head of the Building Designs Department of Kharkiv National Academy of Urban Economy
- Awards: Medals: Honorary Badge – 40 Years of Youth Residential Complex Movement Medal (2011) Silver Medal of the Academy of Construction of Ukraine (2013) Gold Medal of A. N. Podgorny of the Engineering Academy of Ukraine «For outstanding Contribution to the Development of Science, Technology and Engineering» (2014) Honorary titles: Laureate of the State Prize of Ukraine in the Field of Architecture (1995) Excellence in Education of Ukraine (2002) Honored Worker of Science and Technology of Ukraine (2015)
- Scientific career
- Fields: Methods of theoretical and experimental research of constructions, applied mechanics
- Workplaces: Kharkiv National Academy of Urban Economy

Valery Samuilovich Shmukler (Ukrainian: Валерій Самуїлович Шмуклер, Russian: Валерий Самуилович Шмуклер; 26 June 1946 – 3 November 2023) was a Ukrainian engineer, an expert in the field of construction, reconstruction, the theory of structural systems, information technology, calculation and design of structures, and methods of optimization and rationalization of the scientific theory of rationalization building constructions. He was an academician of the Academy of Construction of Ukraine (1999), doctor of technical sciences (1997), professor (2001), winner of the State Prize of Ukraine in the Field of Architecture (1995), Laureate of the State Prize of Ukraine in the field of science and technology (2020), Honored Scientist of Ukraine (2015), emeritus professor of Kharkiv National Academy of Urban Economy (2014), chief of the department of building construction of Kharkiv National Academy of Urban Economy, a member of the International Association for Shell and Spatial Structures IASS (1980), and a member of the American Concrete Institute (1997).

== Biography ==
Shmukler was born on 26 June 1946, in the city of Krasnoyarsk, USSR to Jewish parents. His family moved to the city of Kharkiv in 1949. His father, Samuel I. Shmukler was a mechanical engineer and worked all his life in the construction and mounting trust No. 86 as a chief mechanic. His mother, Shklovskaya Asya Abramovna was a chemist and the head of the laboratory at the pharmaceutical institute. In 1964 he entered the Kharkiv Institute of Civil Engineering (now – Kharkiv National University of Building and Architecture) in faculty "Industrial and Civil Engineering", from which he graduated in 1969. After graduating in civil engineering from 1969 to 1986, he worked in the Kharkovproekt consistently occupying positions from the engineer to the chief of the department, and from 1986 to 1990, in the Ukrgorstroyproekt, where he occupied positions from the head of technical department to the deputy chief engineer of the institute. In 1977, he defended his PhD thesis and, in 1997, his thesis for technical sciences. Since 1990, Shmukler worked at O. M. Beketov National University of Urban Economy (formerly Kharkiv National Academy of Urban Economy), consistently occupying positions of professor of building structures and chief of building structures department (from 2012). Valery Shmukler died on 3 November 2023, at the age of 77.

== Work in state design institutes ==
After graduating from the Kharkiv Institute of Civil Engineering, Shmukler, from 1969 to 1990, worked in the research and design institutes Kharkovproekt (1969–1986) and Ukrgorstroyproekt (1986–1990) where he held various positions such as head of the technical department and deputy chief engineer of the institute. During his time in Kharkovproekt, he created one of the first computation centers and computer-aided design of industrial and civil structures in Ukraine. Under his leadership and direct participation, a number of CAD software systems were created. These developments were the basis of his dissertation for the degree of candidate of technical sciences "flat concrete casing research work." The work suggested and developed new accounting methods for physical and geometrical nonlinearities in solving the problems of static stability of membrane covering. Also, in these years, Shmukler co-authored a series of CJC (Complex Kharkiv Series) for the construction of large sixteen residential buildings and was one of the organizers of a network of data centers roses State Construction Committee of Ukraine. Over the years of work in the GUI (Ukrgorstroyproekt), Shmukler was one of the pioneers in creating and developing youth and housing construction in Ukraine. After the 1988 Armenian earthquake, Vitalii actively reconstructed housing that had welfare and cultural purposes. He was one of the first to engage in implementing the industrial facilities of reinforced concrete and metal spatial structures in buildings and structures of the country.

== Scientific work ==
Shmukler's scientific interests were associated with the theory of structural systems, information technology for the calculation and design of structures, and methods of their optimization and rationalization. His main works in this area included the integrated gradient method for finding the global extremum of functionals on many variables, a method for solving multi-objective optimization problems, overdetermined contour collocation method for solving boundary problems in the theory of plates and shells, and compilation methods for solving nonlinear problems of the theory of constructions. A cycle of his work devoted to the creation of direct design methods, well-founded principles of new energy, is the basis of the formation of constructions with simple external and complex internal geometry. Based on this work, the following were created: a family of gantry and bridge cranes up to 800 tons and the architectural construction systems RAMPA, IKAR, DOBOL, intended for housing and civil engineering.

In 1999, he was elected as a member of the Ukrainian Academy of Construction. Shmukler's scientific achievements were marked with state awards: for the organization, implementation, and development of the youth construction in Ukraine – 40 Years of Youth Residential Complex Movement Medal (2011); and for his outstanding contribution to the development of science, technology, and engineering in Ukraine – Silver Medal of the Academy of Construction of Ukraine (2013) and Gold Medal of A. N. Podgorny of the Engineering Academy of Ukraine (2014). In 2015 he was awarded the honorary title «Honored Worker of Science and Technology of Ukraine». References to Shmukler's works can be found in a number of books, articles, dissertations, and research reports. The constructions developed by him are used and applied in a number of projected and constructed facilities.

== Educational activity ==
From 1990, Shmukler combined active scientific work with teaching activities at Kharkiv National Academy of Urban Economy, consecutively occupying the positions of professor of the Building Designs Department and, from 2012, Head of Department. Shmukler gave lectures on the modern theory of building designs, including the latest advances in the field of construction and applied mechanics, computer science, materials, and structural systems. The audience of his lectures consisted of students, graduate students, doctoral students, university professors, and specialists in the construction field. Shmukler also worked with graduate students and doctoral candidates of the Kharkiv National Automobile and Highway University and Kharkiv State Technical University of Construction and Architecture. He paid much attention to the integration of science and education. Over the years, Shmukler made a significant contribution to the development of the scientific theory of rationalization of building designs. He was the author of many important initiatives, including the establishment of the school "Structures and materials for residential and civil buildings" (1992). Within the framework of the school he headed, multidisciplinary theoretical and experimental research of constructions is conducted, both for Ukraine and other countries. Works of the school are the basis for the functioning of the master's, postgraduate and doctoral studies at the university's Building Designs Department. Paying great attention to the training of highly qualified personnel, Shmukler prepared 12 candidates and one doctor of technical sciences. His students work in universities and factories both in Ukraine and abroad. Shmukler was a member of the Specialized Academic Council (D 64.056.4) at the Kharkiv State Technical University of Construction and Architecture for doctoral and master's theses on the construction specialization 05.23.01 "Building constructions, buildings and structures." Shmukler was awarded numerous certificates of honor by the USSR State Construction Committee, Kharkiv City Council, administrations of design institutes, and Rector of Kharkiv National Academy of Urban Economy, and was awarded the diploma "Excellence in Higher Education of Ukraine" (2002). In 2014, Shmukler, for his scientific and pedagogical contribution, his professional and human qualities, and for providing high-performance work so entrusted to him, was awarded the title of "Honoured Professor of Kharkiv National Academy of Urban Economy".

== Publications ==
Shmukler was an author and co-author of over 180 scientific papers and 60 inventions. His works have been published in leading scientific journals in Ukraine, Russia, Great Britain, Italy, China, Japan, the U.S., and Iraq. Shmukler was a member of the editorial boards of scientific journals, namely the Concrete and Reinforced Concrete in Ukraine (Poltava), the Scientific Construction Bulletin (Kharkiv), and the Urban Economy of Cities (Kharkiv). He was a co-author of seven books and teaching aids:

– Complex of programs for the calculation of the shallow shells supported along the contour considering physical and geometric nonlinearity. – M., 1975;

– Program system of drawing schemes and designs. – M., 1986;

– Information technology for calculating and structural design. – Kiev; Kharkiv, 2003;

– Frame systems of facilitated type. – Kharkiv, 2008;

– Practical calculation of elements for concrete structures under DBN V. 2.6-98:2009 as compared to the calculations under SniP 2.03.01-84* and EN 1992-1-1 (Eurocode 2). – Kharkiv, 2015;

– Numerical and experimental methods of rational design and construction of constructive systems - Kyiv, 2017;

– Rational Design of Structural Building Systems : monograph / V. Babayev, I. Ievzerov, S. Evel, A. Lantoukh-Liashchenko, V. Shevetovsky, O. Shimanovskyi, V. Shmukler, M. Sukhonos. – Berlin : DOM publishers, 2020. – 384 p. – (Construction and Engineering Manual).

And national regulatory documents:

– DBN V.2.6-98-2009 "Concrete and reinforced concrete structures";

– Project DSTU-Н Б EN 1996-1-Eurocode 6 "Design of masonry structures";

– DSTU B V.2.6-2010 "Construction of buildings and structures. Monolithic, reinforced concrete structures of buildings"; recommendations for the use of reinforcing bars under DSTU 3760–98 in the design and manufacture of reinforced concrete structures without pretension;

– DSTU-N B.2.6-205: 2015. The name of the design of monolithic concrete and reinforced concrete constructions of buildings and structures, etc.

For the list of Shmukler's published works and inventions, see References section.
