= Victor Vechersky =

Ukrainian architect (born 1958)

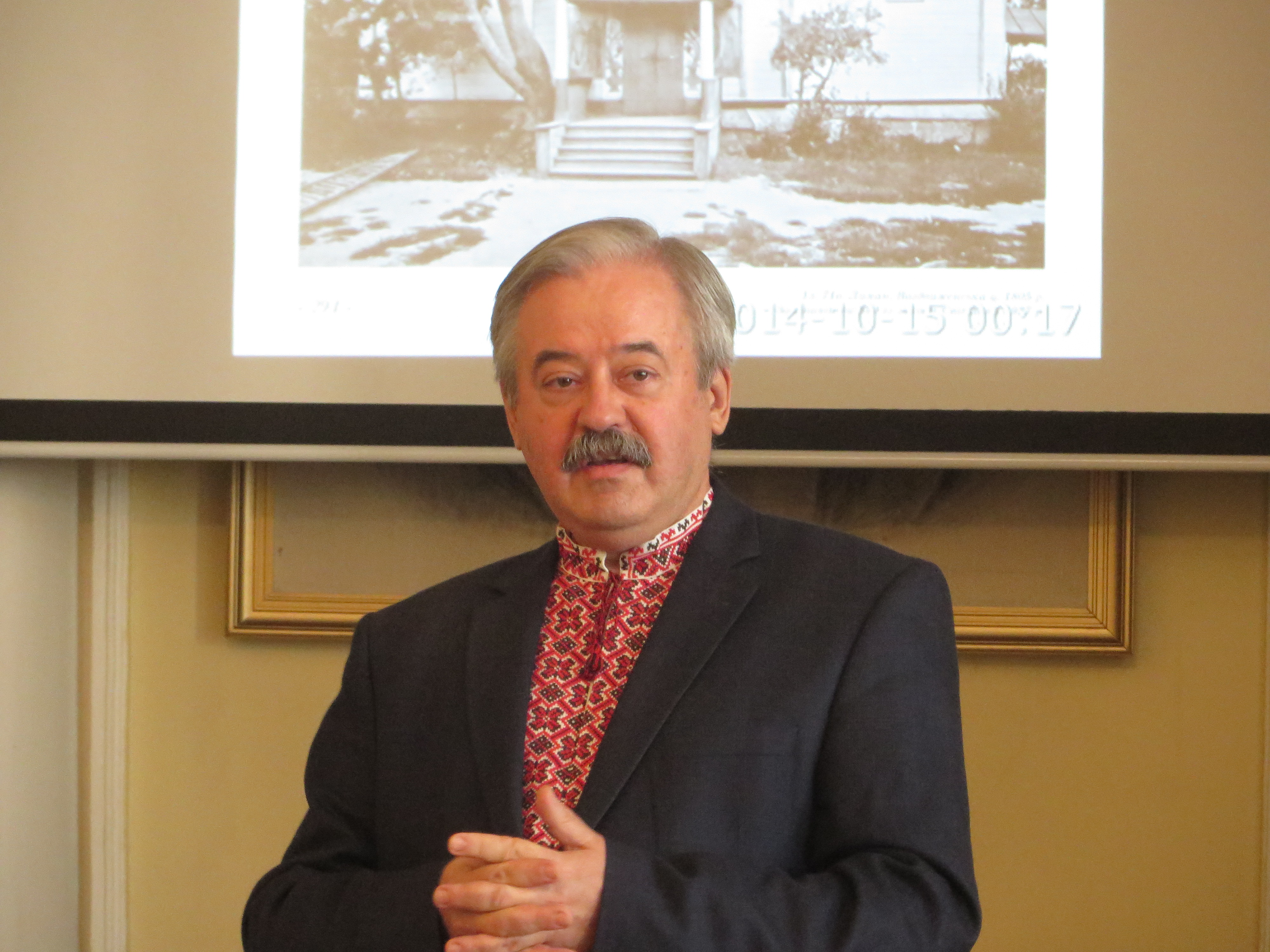
- Born: 15 August 1958 (age 68); Kyiv
- Education: Kyiv State Institute of Art
- Occupation: Architect
- Awards: State Prize of Ukraine in the Field of Architecture in 1998 and 2007; I. Morgilevsky Architectural and Town-planning Prize in 1999; Honoured Cultural Worker of Ukraine, 1995

Victor Vechersky (born 15 August 1958) grew up in Kyiv, the Ukrainian SSR of the Soviet Union and present-day Ukraine. He is a Ukrainian architect who graduated from the Kyiv State Institute of Art architectural department in 1981. He gained his PhD in architecture in 2001.

Awards, prizes, honorary titles: State Prize of Ukraine in the Field of Architecture in 1998 and 2007; I. Morgilevsky Architectural and Town-planning Prize in 1999; Honored Cultural Worker of Ukraine, 1995.

He is also a scientist (Deputy Head of the Institute of Monument Protection Research under the Ministry of Culture and Tourism of Ukraine), and a teacher (Asst. Prof. National Academy of Visual Arts and Architecture).

Victor Vechersky is the author of numerous architectural studies, including: Researches and Restoration:

- Movchansky Monastery in Putyvl (1981);
- Wooden Fortress in Putyvl (1986);
- Reconstruction of the House of Ukrainian Painter Mykola Pymonenko in the village of Maliutianka (1990).

Plans and projects of protection areas for historical cities:

- Hlukhiv (1984);
- Poltava (1984);
- Lebedyn (1985);
- Chernivtsi (1986, 2006);
- Chyhyryn (1987);
- Putyvl (1987);
- Romny (1987);
- Okhtyrka (1988);
- Trostianets (1989);
- Bilopillia (1990);
- Konotop (1991);
- Sumy (1993, 2011);
- Odessa (2007);
- Vasylkiv (2008);
- Kyiv (2009–2010).

Projects of creation state historical-architectural preserves: Putyvl (1986), Hlukhiv (1992), Sumy (1993). Rehabilitation and preservation of historical town-building formation in Hlukhiv (1997).

State program of preservation of historical town-building formation in Hlukhiv (1999).

Master plans of state historical-architectural preserves in Hlukhiv (2003), Putyvl (2006), Chernihiv (2008).

Documentaries: "The World of Ukraine":

"The Temples of Ukraine" (1996),

- "The Ukrainian Elite" (1997),
- "The Ukrainian Steppe" (1998),
- "The Crimea" (1999).

Books:

- Historical-Architectural Researches of Ukrainian Towns, Moscow, 1990;
- The State Register of the National Heritage (Monuments of Architecture and Urbanism), Kyiv, 1999;
- Architectural and Urbanistic Heritage of Hetmanate Period: Creation, Research, Preservation, Kyiv, 2001;
- The Lost Objects of the Architectural Heritage in Ukraine, Kyiv, 2002;
- The Old Urban Heritage: The Historical and Urbanistic Researches for Historic Preservation of Inhabited Sites in Ukraine, Kyiv, 2003;
- Hlukhiv, Kyiv, 2003;
- Ukrainian Heritage, Kyiv, 2004;
- The Lost Temples, Kyiv, 2004;
- Heritage of Architecture and Urbanism of Left-bank Ukraine: Recognition, Researches, Recording, Kyiv, 2005;
- Castles and Fortresses of Ukraine, Kyiv, 2005;
- A History of Architecture, Kyiv, 2006;
- A History of Architecture of Eastern Europe, Kyiv, 2007;
- Ukrainian Wooden Churches (Kyiv, 2007);
- Monasteries and Churches of Putyvl region (Kyiv, 2007),
- The Capitals of Ukraine in Hetmanate Period (Kyiv, 2008);
- Ukrainian Monasteries (Kyiv, 2008);
- The Historical and Urbanistic Researches of Odesa (Kyiv, 2008);
- The Historical and Urbanistic Researches of Chernivtsi (Kyiv, 2008);
- The Orthodox Churches of Sumy region (Kyiv, 2009);
- The Historical and Urbanistic Researches of Kyiv (Kyiv, 2011);
- The Historical and Urbanistic Researches: Vasylkiv, Vinnytsia, Gorlivka, Izmail (Kyiv, 2011);
- The historical-cultural preserves (Kyiv, 2011);
- The historical-cultural preserves: master plans (Kyiv, 2011);
- Fortresses and Castles of Ukraine, (Kyiv, 2011);
- Ukrainian Wooden Architecture (Kyiv, 2013);
- The Historical and Urbanistic Researches: Sumy, Myrgorod, Korets (Kyiv, 2013);
