= Ukraine is Our Home =

Political party in Ukraine

Ukraine is Our Home Україна – наш дiм
- Abbreviation: UND
- Leader: Borys Kolesnikov
- Founder: Borys Kolesnikov
- Founded: 30 May 2021
- Split from: Opposition Bloc (2019)
- Ideology: Social conservatism (claimed); Pro-Europeanism (claimed); Russophilia (alleged)
- Political position: Centre (claimed)
- Colours: Blue; Yellow

Website
- uaourhome.com

Ukraine is Our Home (Ukrainian: Україна – наш дiм, romanized: Ukraina – nash dim) is a Ukrainian political party that was founded in May 2021. The party is led by former deputy prime minister and former deputy of the Verkhovna Rada (Ukraine's national parliament) Borys Kolesnikov.

On 30 May 2021, the party held its first congress.

Ukrainian and Russian media outlets have speculated that the party is a project of Ukrainian oligarch Rinat Akhmetov and has been created to take votes away from Opposition Platform — For Life. Kolesnikov stated in June 2021 that Akhmetov was "not happy" with the idea of creating the party and "he has nothing to do [with this]." Kolesnikov also denied that the party's electorate were pro-Russian Ukrainians living in the country's southern and eastern regions, and instead claims that the party is centrist and has social conservatism at its core. According to RBK Ukraine, the party was created as a "technical project" of the Office of the President of Ukraine.
