= Volodymyr Babayev =

Ukrainian scholar and politician (1952–2026)

- Володимир Бабаєв
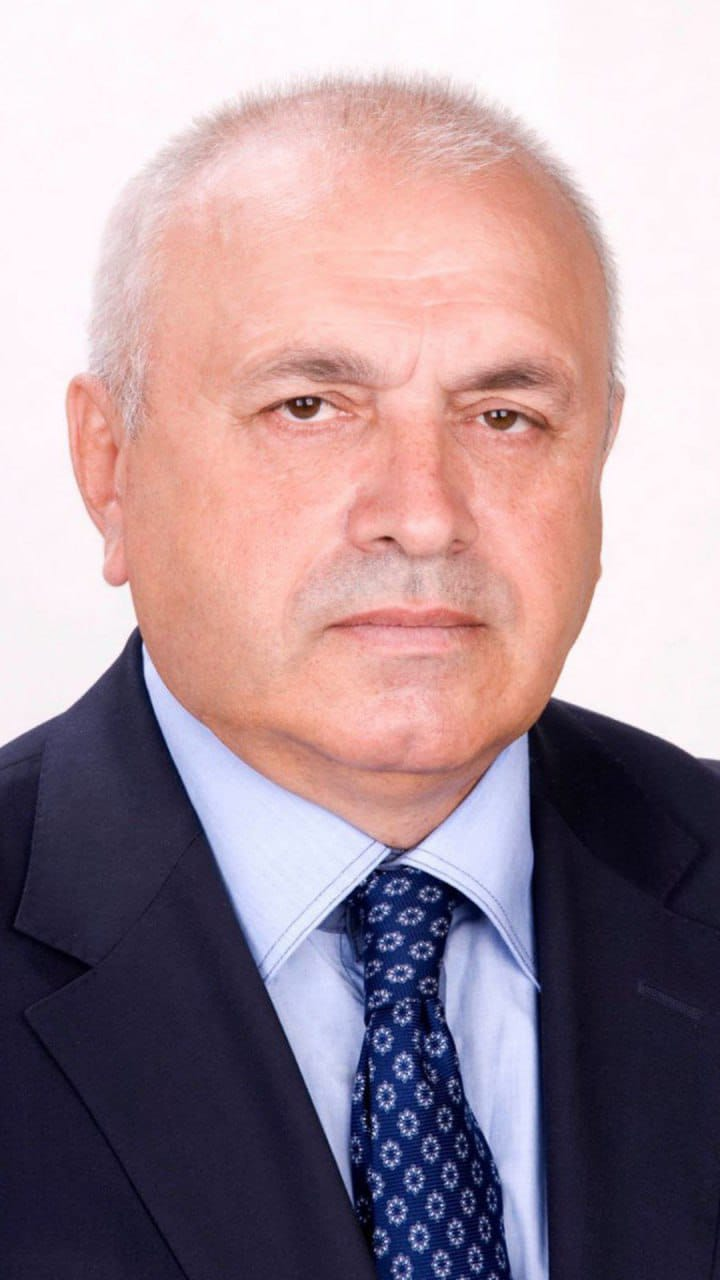
- Babayev in 2016

Acting Governor of Kharkiv Oblast
- In office 9 February – 10 March 2010
- President: Viktor Yushchenko; Viktor Yanukovych
- Preceded by: Arsen Avakov
- Succeeded by: Mykhailo Dobkin

Personal details
- Born: 10 January 1952 Kharkiv, Ukrainian SSR, Soviet Union
- Died: 14 March 2026 (aged 74)
- Education: Kharkiv National University of Construction and Architecture
- Scientific career
- Fields: Construction, public administration
- Workplaces: O. M. Beketov National University of Urban Economy in Kharkiv

Volodymyr Mykolaiovych Babayev (Note: Ukrainian: Володимир Миколайович Бабаєв; Russian: Владимир Николаевич Бабаев, romanized: Vladimir Nikolayevich Babayev) (10 January 1952 – 14 March 2026) was a Ukrainian scholar and politician.

He served as the rector of O. M. Beketov National University of Urban Economy in Kharkiv (2011–2025) and, briefly in 2010, as the acting head of administration of Kharkiv Oblast. He held a Doctorate in Public Administration (2005) and the academic title of Professor (2005). He was elected as an academician of the Academy of Construction of Ukraine in 2011, and since 2013, he served as an academician and the First Vice President of the Engineering Academy of Ukraine.

He was awarded the honorary title of Honored Builder of Ukraine in 1997, the State Prize of Ukraine in the Field of Architecture in 1999, and the State Prize of Ukraine in the Field of Science and Technology in 2020. He was a full chevalier of the Order of Merit (awarded in 2004, 2007, and 2009), and an honorary citizen of Kharkiv (2010).

Babayev died on 14 March 2026, at the age of 74.

Political offices
Preceded by Arsen Avakov	Governor of Kharkiv Oblast; 2010	Succeeded by Mykhailo Dobkin
