= Opposition Bloc (2019) =

Ukrainian political party

Opposition Bloc: Ukrainian: Опозиційний блок; Russian: Оппозиционный блок
- Leader: Yevheniy Murayev
- Deputy Leader: Oleksandr Vilkul
- Chairman: Borys Kolesnikov
- Parliamentary Leader: Vadym Novynskyi
- Founded: 13 June 2014 (Industrial Party of Ukraine) 26 December 2018 (Opposition Bloc — Party for Peace and Development) 7 June 2019 (Opposition Bloc)
- Banned: 25 July 2022
- Merger of: Opposition Bloc (2014); Party for Peace and Development
- Preceded by: Opposition Bloc (2014)
- Succeeded by: Ukraine is Our Home
- Headquarters: Kyiv
- Ideology: Social liberalism; Regionalism; Russophilia; Euroscepticism
- Political position: Centre to centre-left
- Affiliate parties: Nashi; Revival; Trust Deeds; Strong Ukraine; Christian Socialists; Kernes Bloc; Agrarian Party (united); For Case Studies
- Oligarch association: Donetsk Clan
- Colours: Blue; White
- Verkhovna Rada (2019): 6 / 450 (1%)
- Regions (2020): 208 / 43,122 (0.5%)

Party flag
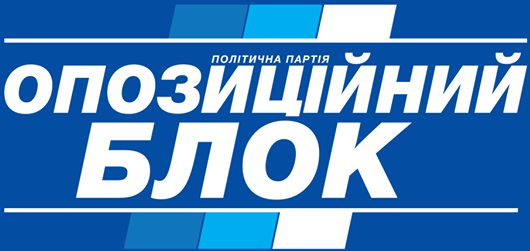

Website
- opposition.com.ua

Opposition Bloc, (Note: Ukrainian: Опозиційний блок, romanized: Opozytsiinyi blok; Russian: Оппозиционный блок, romanized: Oppozitsionny blok) formerly called Opposition Bloc — Party for Peace and Development (Note: Ukrainian: Опозиційний блок — Партія миру та розвитку, romanized: Opozytsiinyi blok — Partiia myru ta rozvytku; Russian: Оппозиционный блок — Партия мира и развития, romanized: Oppozitsionny blok — Partiya mira i razvitiya) until June 2019, was a Ukrainian political party that was founded in 2019. On 8 June 2022, the party was banned in court. The ban was not appealed and the party officially ceased to exist on 25 July of the same year.

The creation of the party was the result of a schism in the Opposition Bloc party, a party of the same name founded in 2014. By January 2019, two wings of this party had nominated two different candidates for the 2019 Ukrainian presidential election. Yuriy Boyko was nominated by the party wing called Opposition Platform — For Life, while a competing party wing wanted to nominate Oleksandr Vilkul as its candidate. The party wing supporting Vilkul formed a new party, Opposition Bloc — Party for Peace and Development. That new party proceeded to nominate Vilkul as its presidential candidate. In the 2019 Ukrainian parliamentary election, the new party won six single-seat constituencies, and its nationwide list won 3.23% of the votes, failing to overcome the 5% election barrier.

Legally, Opposition Bloc — Party for Peace and Development is the successor of the Industrial Party of Ukraine (Ukrainian: Індустріальна Україна, Russian: Индустриальная Украина) founded in 2014.

== History ==
In 2014, six parties that did not endorse Euromaidan merged into a new party called Opposition Bloc, which was social-liberal and pro-Russian. In the 2014 Ukrainian parliamentary election, the party won 29 seats, predominantly in the Dnipropetrovsk, Donetsk, Zaporizhzhia, Luhansk, and Kharkiv oblasts.

According to Ukrainska Pravda, in the summer of 2018, negotiations began regarding the unification of the parties For Life (which had split from Opposition Bloc in 2016) and Opposition Bloc. Ukrainska Pravda reported that these talks were instigated by Serhiy Lyovochkin, who, along with Dmytro Firtash, controlled one of the wings of Opposition Bloc; Rinat Akhmetov controlled the other wing of Opposition Bloc. In early November 2018, the party members loyal to Akhmetov decided to pause the negotiations.

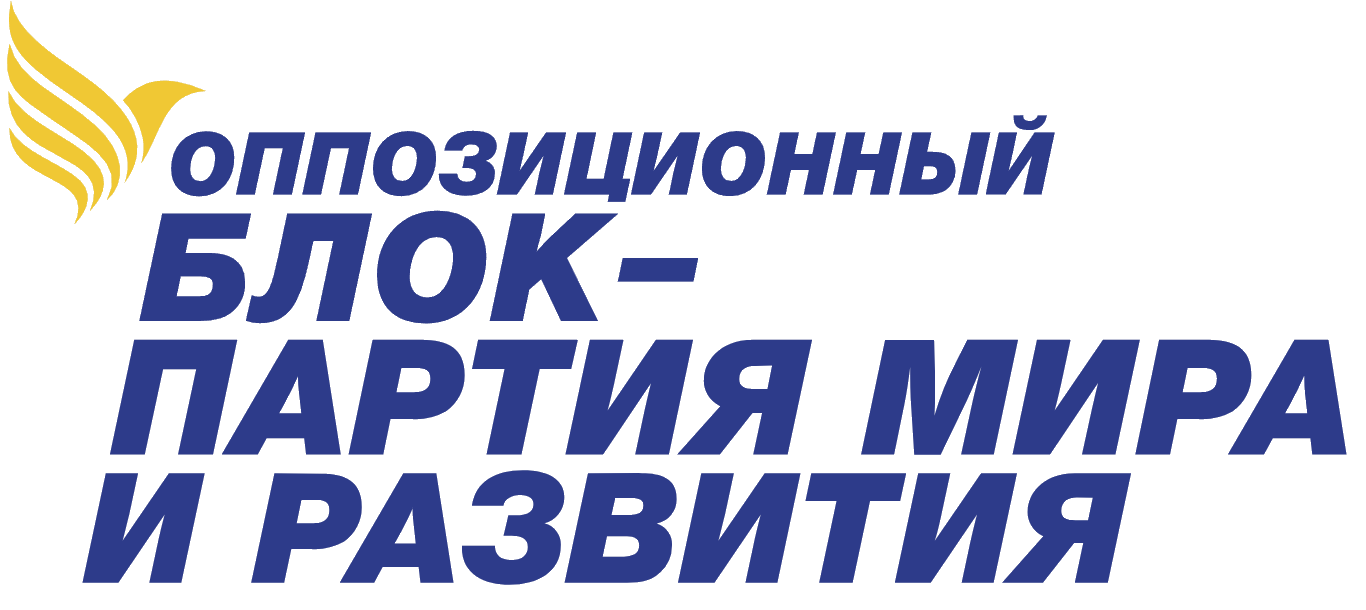
Opposition Bloc — Party for Peace and Development

On 9 November 2018, Opposition Bloc chairman Boyko and Vadim Rabinovich's party For Life signed an agreement for cooperation in the 2019 Ukrainian presidential election and the parliamentary election of the same year, and created the alliance Opposition Platform — For Life. The same day, Opposition Bloc leading members Vadym Novynskyi and Borys Kolesnikov claimed that the agreement was a "personal initiative" of Boyko and that the party had not taken any decisions on cooperation with For Life. On 17 November 2018, Opposition Platform — For Life nominated Boyko as its candidate in the 2019 Ukrainian presidential election. The same day, Opposition Bloc member Party of Development of Ukraine joined the Opposition Platform — For Life alliance. On 20 November 2018, Boyko and Serhiy Lyovochkin (the leading member of the Party of Development of Ukraine) were excluded from the Opposition Bloc faction because they "betrayed our voters' interests", according to the faction co-chairman, Vilkul.

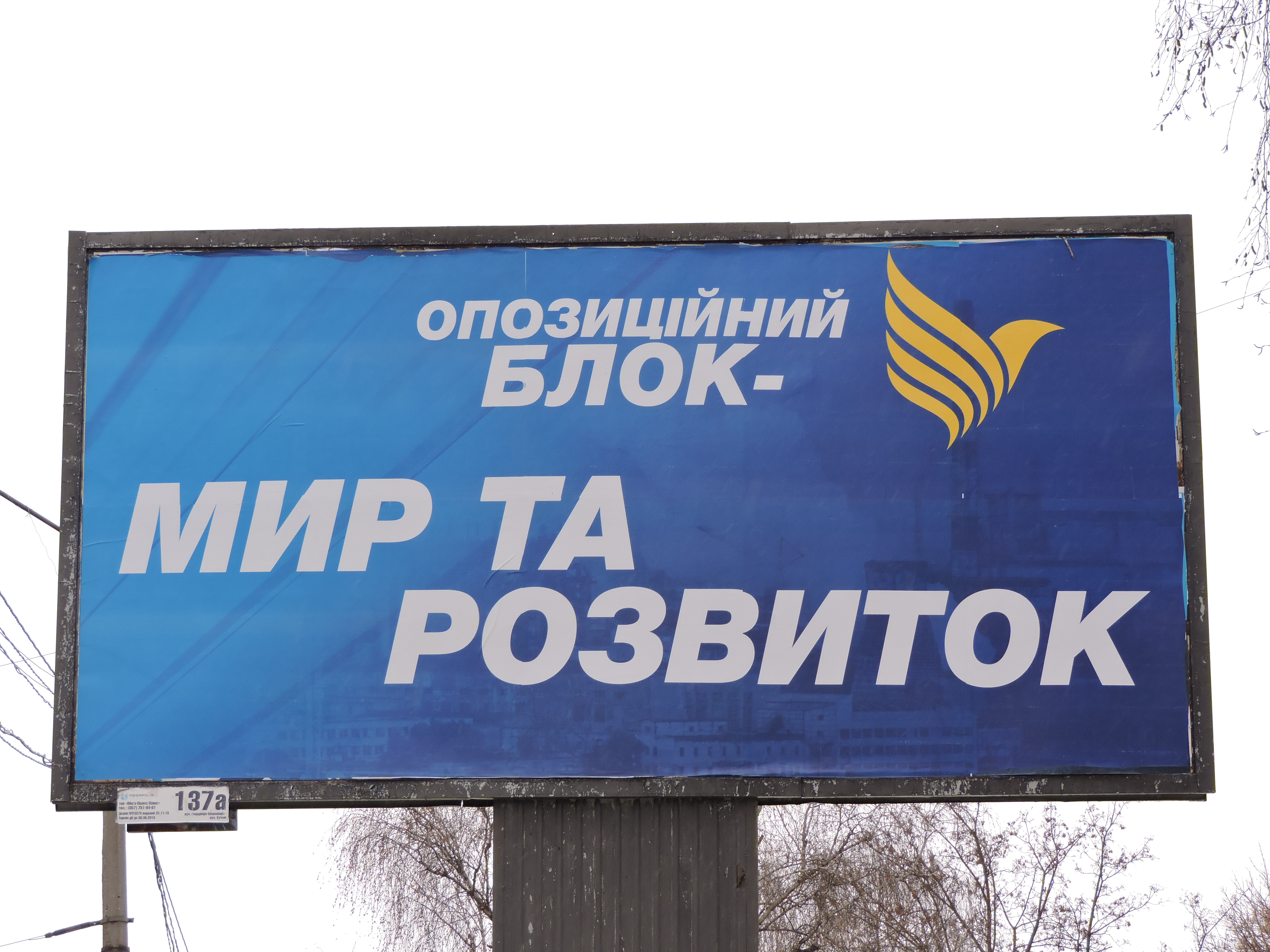
Opposition Bloc billboard in Kharkiv

On 17 December 2018, an Opposition Bloc congress nominated Oleksandr Vilkul as their candidate in the 2019 Ukrainian presidential election. A Ukrainian court had ruled three days before (in response to a lawsuit filed by People's Deputy of Ukraine for Opposition Bloc Serhiy Larin) that Opposition Bloc's congress, at which Vikul was to be nominated, could not "reorganize the party by any means". On 18 December 2018, the website of Opposition Bloc stated that therefore all of the decisions made at the congress were invalid. On 20 December 2018 the website of Opposition Bloc was down. Vilkul was nominated for the presidency again by Opposition Bloc — Party of Peace and Development (the recently renamed Industrial Party of Ukraine) on 20 January 2019. According to Liga.net, Rinat Akhmetov had renamed Industrial Party of Ukraine to Opposition Bloc — Party of Peace and Development solely to circumvent the court's injunction of 20 December 2018 (which prohibited any changes to the statute of the Opposition Bloc party). The Industrial Party of Ukraine was registered by the Ministry of Justice on 13 June 2014, and Rostyslav Shurma was then the chairman of that party. Shurma was at the time General Director of Zaporizhstal, part of the industrial complex owned by Rinat Akhmetov.

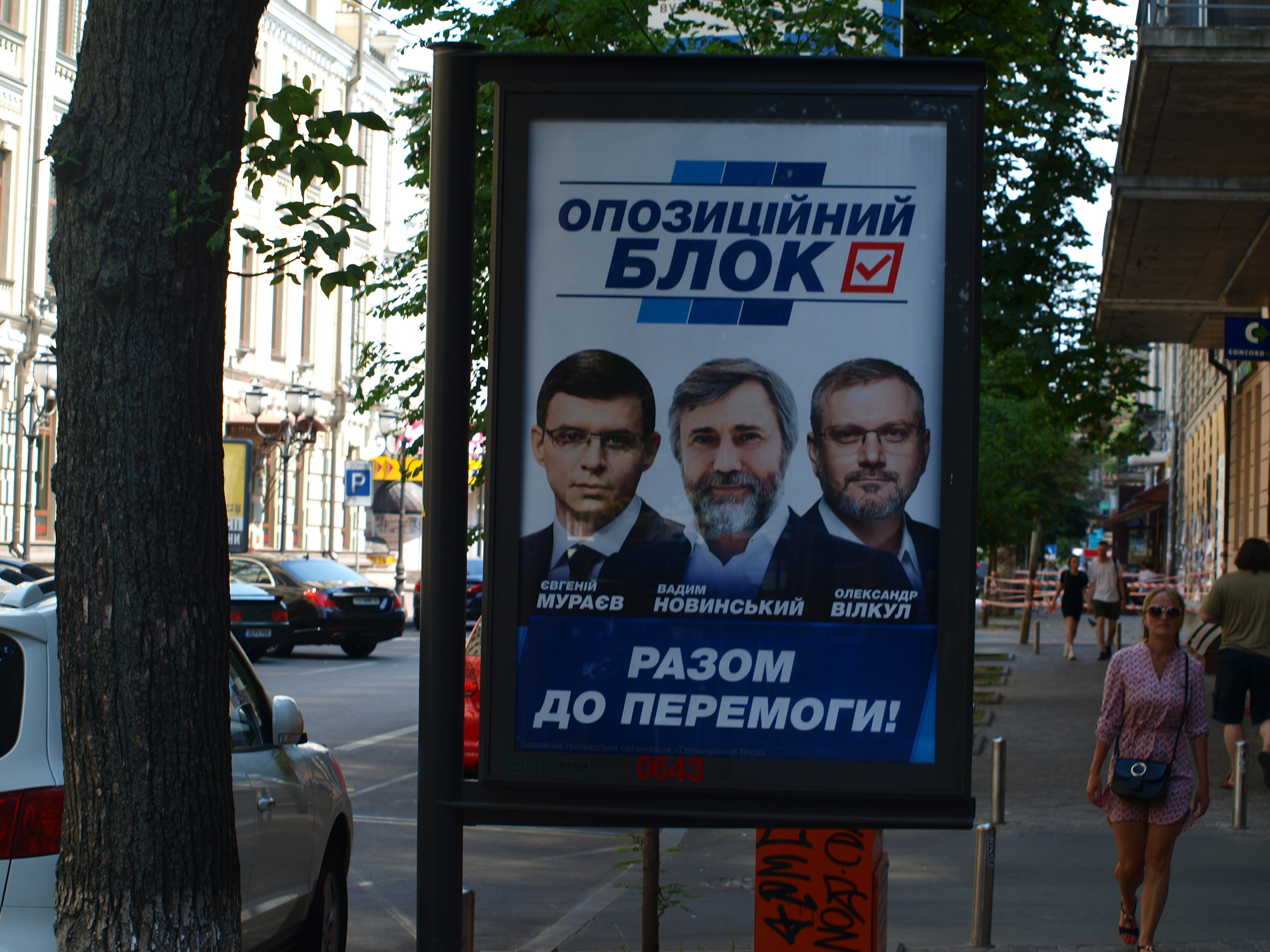
Advertising of the Opposition Bloc in Kyiv

In the 2019 Ukrainian parliamentary election, an alliance was formed between Rinat Akhmetov's wing in the Opposition Bloc party and Borys Kolesnikov's and Oleksandr Vilkul's Party of Peace and Development. The alliance was later joined by Revival, Nashi, and Trust Deeds; the alliance selected Evgeny Murayev as leader of the united party list. In the election, the mayors of Kharkiv (Hennadiy Kernes) and Odesa (Gennadiy Trukhanov) were placed in the top ten of the nationwide party list.

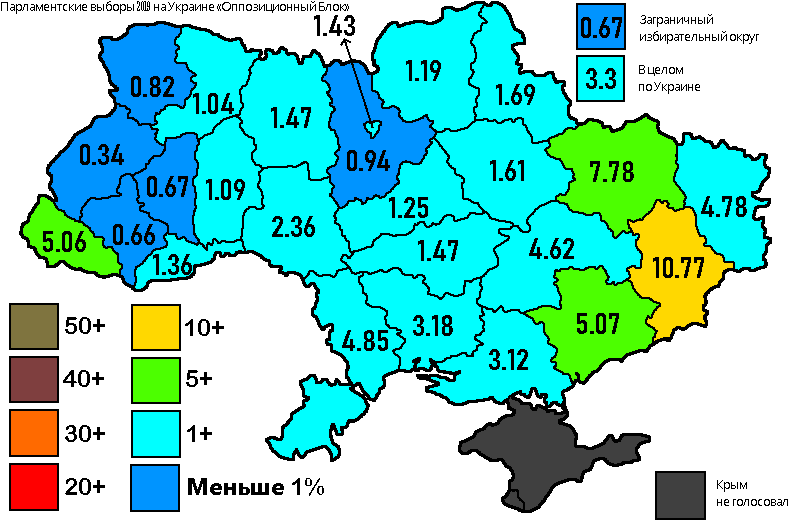
Opposition Bloc — Party for Peace and Development support (% of the votes cast) in different regions of Ukraine in the 2019 parliamentary election.

In the 2019 Ukrainian parliamentary election, the party won six single-seat constituencies; the nationwide list, with 3.23% of the votes, did not overcome the 5% election barrier, so those six seats were the only seats that the party won in the election.

In the 2020 Ukrainian local elections the party gained 206 deputies (0.48% of all available mandates). It saw success in Zaporizhzhia Oblast, where it gained eight seats on the Zaporizhzhia Oblast Council.

By 2021, the party's activities had winded down significantly, and the Ukrainian press announced that the political project itself was de facto closed. The party's leading figure, oligarch Rinat Akhmetov, announced the creation of a new political force in April 2021 on the basis of Opposition Bloc. In early May, one of the other key figures of Opposition Bloc Borys Kolesnikov announced the creation of a new political force Ukraine is Our Home.

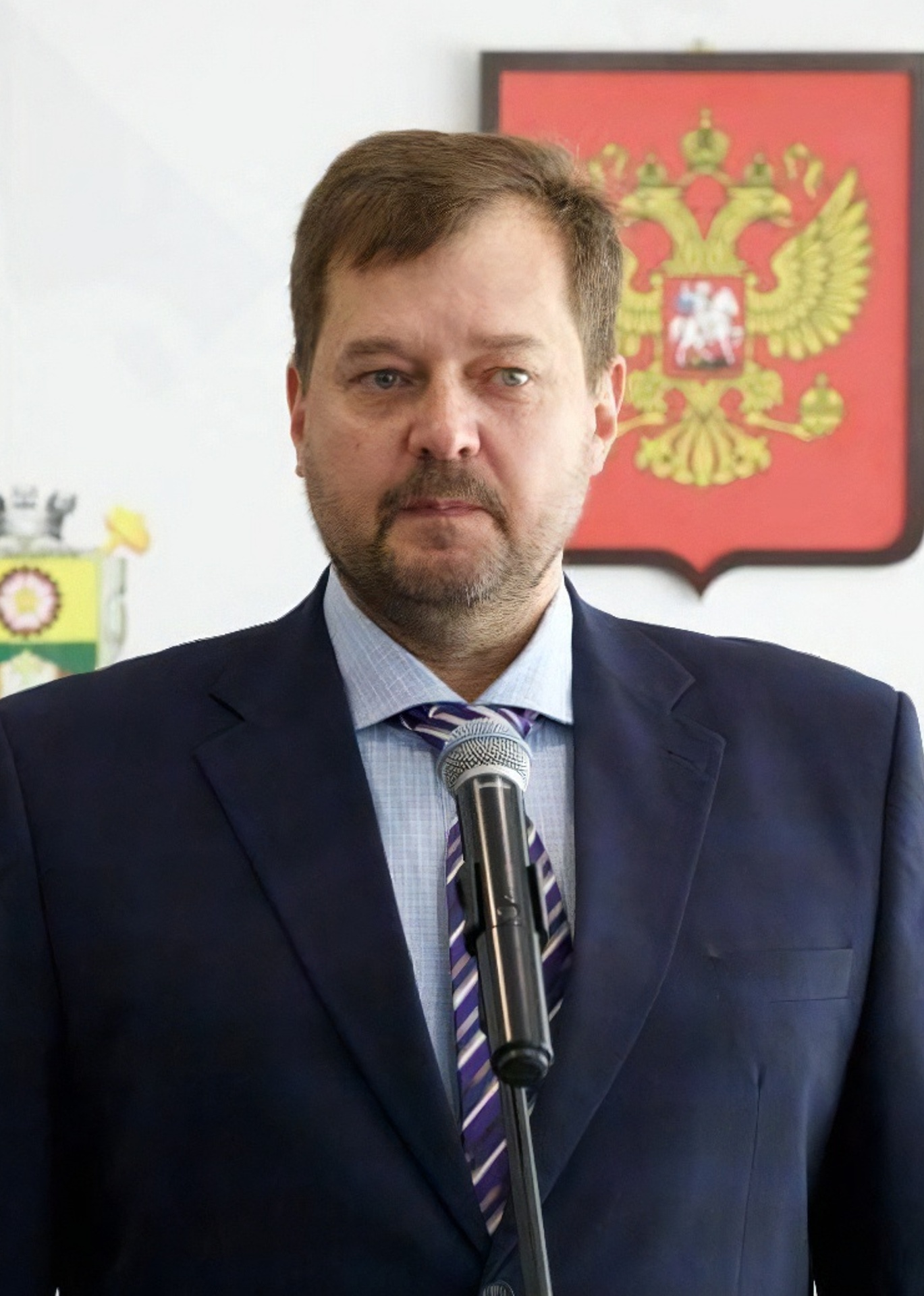
Yevgeny Balitsky

Since the beginning of the Russian invasion of Ukraine, collaborationism has become widespread among party members. So, on March 12, 2022, thanks to cooperation with the Russian army, Galina Danilchenko, a representative of the Opposition Bloc in Melitopol, was proclaimed by the Russians as “acting mayor of the city.” This happened the day after the arrest of Mayor Ivan Fedorov by the Russian military. On the same day, she announced that the city council would be abolished and would be replaced by a “Committee of People's Representatives”. Danilchenko appealed to the city residents to “adapt to the new reality” in order to quickly start living in a new way and thanked the head of Chechnya, Ramzan Kadyrov, for the humanitarian assistance.

On 20 March 2022, Opposition Bloc was one of several political parties suspended by the National Security and Defense Council of Ukraine during the Russian invasion of Ukraine, along with Derzhava, Left Opposition, Nashi, Opposition Platform — For Life, Party of Shariy, Progressive Socialist Party of Ukraine, Socialist Party of Ukraine, Union of Leftists, and the Volodymyr Saldo Block.

On 9 May 2022, the head of the Opposition Bloc in the Zaporizhzhia Oblast, Yevgeny Balitsky, appointed to the post of head of the Zaporozhye military–civilian administration.

On 8 June 2022, the Eighth Administrative Court of Appeal banned the Opposition Bloc. The property of the party and all its branches were transferred to the state. The decision was open to an appeal at the Supreme Court of Ukraine. But the decision was not appealed, so on 25 July 2022 the party ceased to exist.

== Party leaders ==
- Evgeny Murayev (chairman and leader of electoral list)
- Oleksandr Vilkul (co-chair)

Political Council

- Borys Kolesnikov

Fraction in Verkhovna Rada leader

- Vadym Novynskyi

== Election results ==
=== Verkhovna Rada ===
Year	Popular vote	% of popular vote	Overall seats won	Seat change	Government
2019	443,195	3.03	6 / 450	▲6	Opposition

Top 10 members of Opposition Bloc for the 2019 parliamentary elections
Yevhen Murayev · Oleksandr Vilkul · Hennadiy Kernes · Gennadiy Trukhanov · Vadym Boychenko
Rostyslav Shurma · Bohdan Andriiv · Volodymyr Buryak · Anatoly Vershina · Vitaliy Khomutynnik

=== Presidential elections ===
Year	Candidate	First round			Second round		Won/Loss
Year	Candidate	Votes	%	Rank	Votes	%	Won/Loss
2019	Oleksandr Vilkul	784,274	4.20%	8th	Eliminated		Loss

=== Local councils ===
Election	Performance				Rank
Election	%	± pp	Seats	+/–	Rank
2020	0.49%	New	208 / 43,122	New	29th

== See also ==
- Opposition Platform — For Life
- Party of Regions
- Opposition Bloc
- Nashi
- Revival
- Trust Deeds
