= Bohdan Andriiv =

Ukrainian politician, mayor of Uzhhorod (since 2015)

- Богдан Андріїв
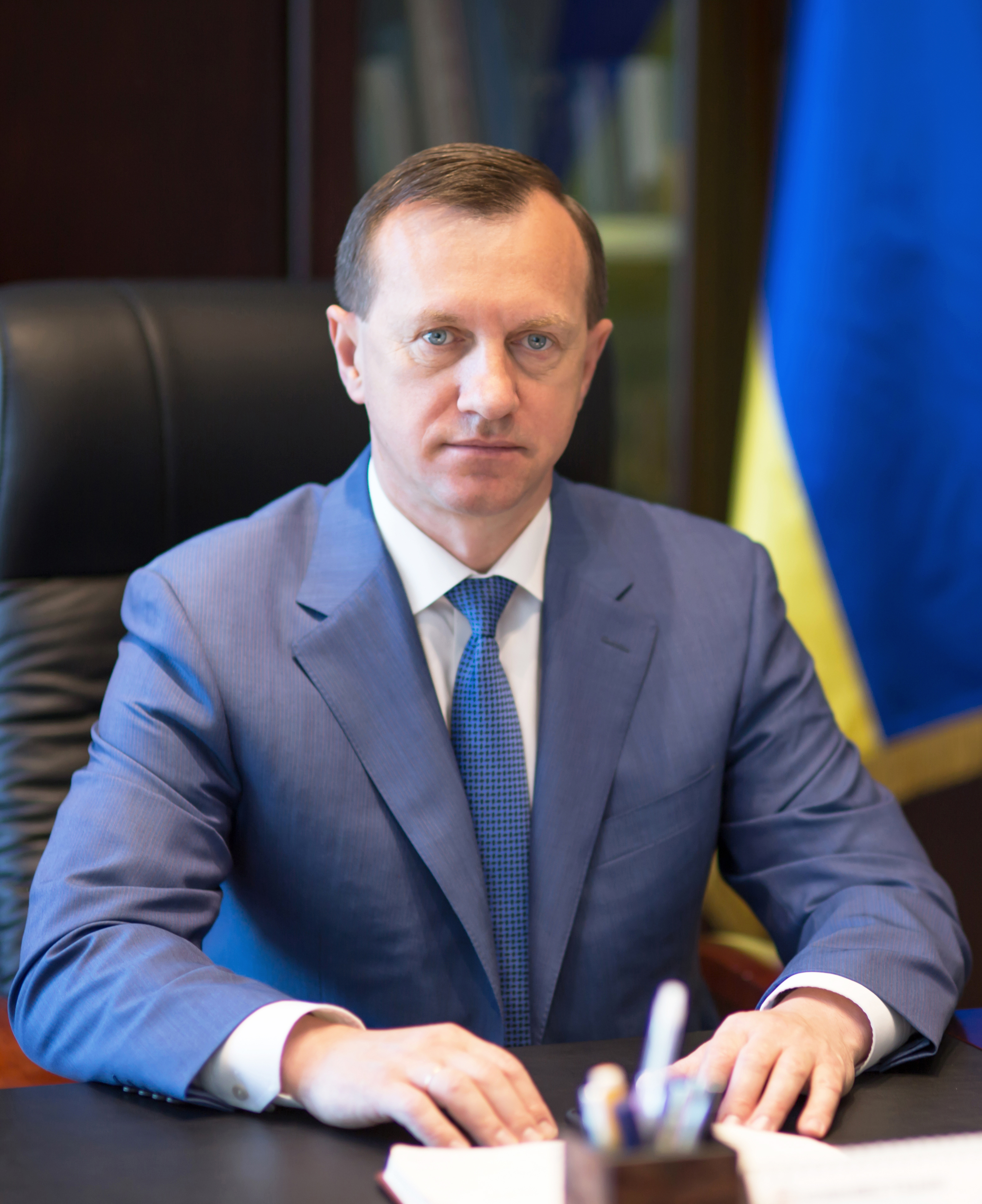
- Andriiv in 2016

Mayor of Uzhhorod
- Incumbent
- Assumed office 16 November 2015
- Preceded by: Viktor Pogorelov

Deputy of Uzhhorod City Council
- In office 2006 – 16 November 2015

Personal details
- Born: August 12, 1969 (age 56) Koniukhov, Lviv Oblast, Soviet Ukraine
- Party: Truth and Deeds
- Other political affiliations: Party of Regions
- Education: Odesa National Academy of Food Technologies (1995); Kyiv University of Law (2004)
- Profession: Politician, businessman

Bohdan Yevstafiyovich Andriiv (Ukrainian: Богдан Євстафійович Андріїв; born 12 August 1969) is a Ukrainian politician and mayor of Uzhhorod since 2015.

During the 2019 Ukrainian elections, Andriiv was a candidate for People's Deputy under the "Opposition Bloc" coalition, but was unsuccessful. Andriiv was formerly a member of the pro-Russian Party of Regions.

== Early life and education ==
Bohdan Andriiv was born on August 12, 1969, in the village of Koniukhiv, Lviv Oblast in Soviet Ukraine.

In 1986, Andriiv graduated from secondary school in the village of Duliby.

From 1986 to 1987, he worked as a junior medical worker at the Stryi Raion Hospital. After that, he served in the Soviet Army for two years, ending in 1989.

Then in December 1989, Andriiv attended the Odesa National Academy of Food Technologies, graduating in 1995 with a degree in food industry equipment.

In July 1995, Andriiv was appointed to the position of leading specialist and head of department at the Transcarpathian Center for Certified Auctions

From November 1996 to November 2004, he was an employee of the Carpathian Regional Customs. He worked as a senior inspector, chief inspector and head of the anti-smuggling department. In 2004, he started participating in entrepreneurial activity.

In 2004, Andriiv graduated from the Kyiv University of Law of the National Academy of Sciences of Ukraine with a degree in jurisprudence and received the qualifications for being a lawyer.

== Political career ==
In 2006, he was elected as a deputy of the Uzhhorod City Council of the 5th convocation. Four years later, he again became a deputy of the city council as a member of the Party of Regions.

From November 2014 to November 2015, he was the secretary of the Uzhhorod City Council.

From November 20, 2014, to November 15, 2015, Andriiv became the acting mayor of Uzhhorod, later winning a full term following the 2015 Ukrainian local elections. In 2017, Ukrainska Pravda released a list of top-20 most innovative mayors in Ukraine, in which Andriiv was included.

In January 2017, Andriyev's first deputy Istvan Tsap was suspected bribery, the prosecutor's office and the Security Service of Ukraine searched Andriiv's office.

In 2018, Andriiv helped implement improvements for public transportation in Uzhhorod, including buses with larger capacities and seats for disabled persons.

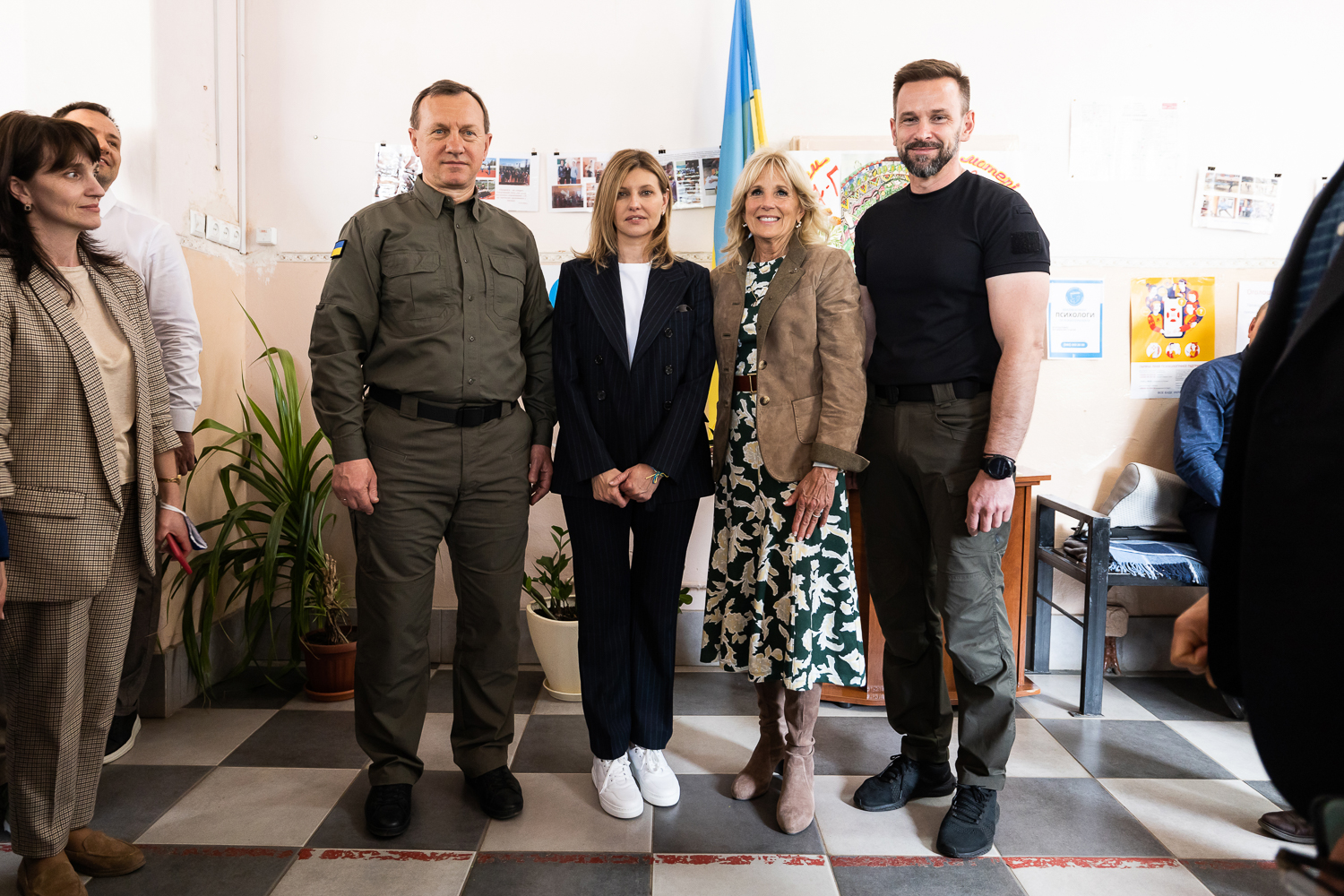
Andriiv (far-left) with First Lady of Ukraine Olena Zelenska, First Lady of the United States Jill Biden, and Governor of Zakarpattia Oblast, Viktor Mykyta, May 2022

Initiated the establishment of the first

== Personal life ==
In 2018, a criminal case opened against Andriiv for allegedly embezzling 4.6 million hryvnias during the construction of a cultural center in the city. He was arrested for 2 months, but was later offered bail by Hennadiy Moskal, the governor of Zakarpattia Oblast. Andriiv was released after paying a bail of 440,000 hryvnias.

== Property ==
In 2019, Andriiv declared that he owned four apartments in Kyiv.
