= Borys Kolesnikov =

Ukrainian politician

- Борис Колесніков
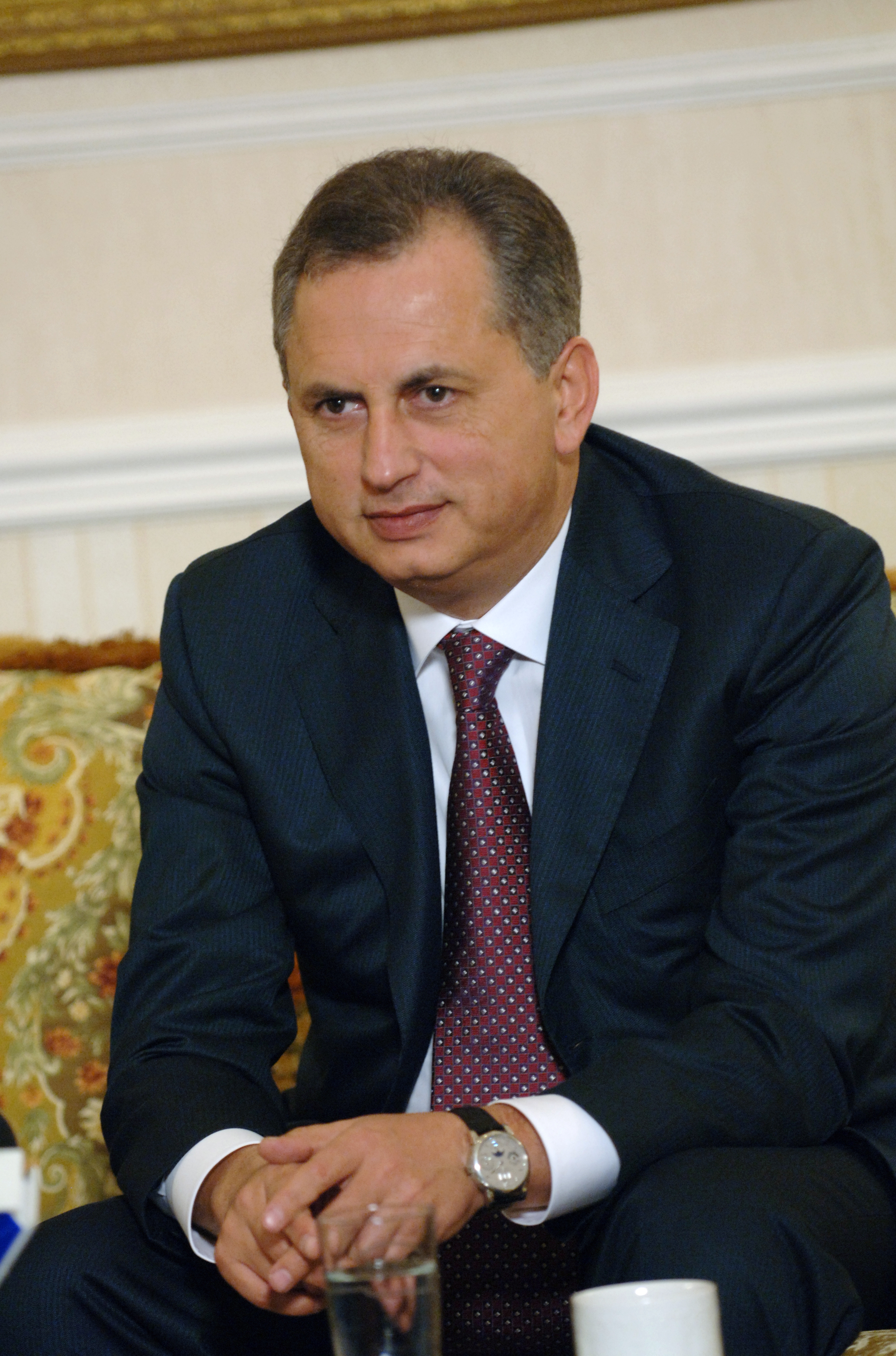
- Kolesnikov in 2009

People's Deputy of Ukraine
- In office 12 December 2012 – 27 November 2014
- In office 25 May 2006 – 11 March 2010

Deputy Prime Minister of Ukraine
- In office 11 March 2010 – 24 December 2012

Chairman of Donetsk Oblast Council
- In office May 2001 – 25 April 2006
- Preceded by: Viktor Yanukovych
- Succeeded by: Anatoliy Blyznyuk

Personal details
- Born: 25 October 1962 (age 63) Zhdanov, Ukrainian SSR, Soviet Union
- Party: Opposition Bloc (until 2018); Party for Peace & Development (2019–2021); Ukraine is Our Home (2021–present)
- Other political affiliations: Opposition Bloc — Party for Peace and Development
- Spouse: Svitlana
- Children: Son (born 1992) and daughter (born 2004)

Borys Viktorovych Kolesnikov (Ukrainian: Борис Вікторович Колесніков, born 25 October 1962) is a Ukrainian politician who is the leader of the political party Ukraine is Our Home. He is the former secretary of the Party of Regions' presidium, former people's deputy in Verkhovna Rada (Ukraine's national parliament) and head of the Verkhovna Rada Committee on Transport and Communications, and former deputy prime minister of Ukraine and former Minister of Infrastructure of Ukraine. He is the owner and president of the HC Donbass ice hockey club.

== Biography ==
Born on 25 October 1962 in Zhdanov, Donetsk Oblast, Ukrainian SSR (now Mariupol in eastern Ukraine).

In 1991 graduated from Donetsk National Technical University majoring in Merchandising. Graduated from Donetsk State University of Management (1997) majoring in Economic Manager.

Since 1980 he has worked in various positions in commercial enterprises in the Donetsk Oblast (province), mainly in the steel industry.

Beginning from 1991 – director of “Yug” trading company; chairman of the board of directors, chairman of the board of directors of Production Association “Kyiv-Konti”, CJSC (later the Konti Company). From 1998 – vice-president of football club Shakhtar Donetsk. From 2002 – chairman of the Football Federation of Donetsk Oblast.

From 2001 to 2006 he was head of the Donetsk Regional Council.

Beginning from 2001 a spokesperson of Borys Kolesnikov was Mrs. Olena Bondarenko. Late 2003 – Head of Donetsk Regional Branch of the Party of Regions.

Known as one of the organizers of the Congress of Deputies of All Levels in Severodonetsk on 28 November 2004. At the 2006 parliamentary elections in Ukraine and 2007 parliamentary elections in Ukraine was elected to Verkhovna Rada (Ukrainian parliament) as a member of the Party of Regions (both times listed number ten).

In 2010 appointed to the position of the Vice Prime Minister responsible for Euro 2012. On 9 December 2010 by the Decree of the president of Ukraine was appointed to the position of the Vice Prime Minister of Ukraine, the Minister of Infrastructure of Ukraine.

Kolesnikov is considered an ally of Rinat Akhmetov; another influential Party of Regions member, industrial and politician. Kolesnykov and Akhmetov have been friends from a young age.

In a 30 July 2014 interview with the FBI, Paul Manafort stated that Kolesnikov was his "principal contact" in the Party of Regions.

== Political activity ==
Kolesnikov entered politics in 1999 when Victor Yanukovych was Donetsk Oblast governor, Then another five years as chairman of the Regional Council. First as deputy chairman of the Donetsk Regional Council. In November 2004, during the Orange Revolution, Kolesnikov stated that if Viktor Yushchenko would become President of Ukraine that "would prompt the establishment of a new federal state in the form of a southeastern republic with its capital in Kharkiv". Yushchenko did become president and this federal state never materialized. Kolesnikov was arrested early 2005 on charges of abuse of office, extortion and making a death threat. Kolesnikov has repeatedly denied the charges, which were later dropped. The party claimed to be a victim of a political persecution campaign organized by the new government. The Party of Regions claimed the arrest was an example of political repression. The Council of Europe called the investigation "in full compliance with European standards". Kolesnikov has since been cleared of charges and released from pre-trial detention in August 2005 when he offered a written pledge not to flee the country. By October 2005 Kolesnikov had resumed his job as head of the regional council.

Kolesnikov was elected to the Verkhovna Rada (Ukrainian parliament) as a member of Party of the Regions in 2006 and 2007 (in 2007 as No. 10 on the list) and again in the 2012 Ukrainian parliamentary election (as No. 8 on the list).

After winning the 2010 presidential election Victor Yanukovych stated (on 9 February 2010) that Kolesnikov was his preferred next Prime Minister of Ukraine. Instead of becoming Prime Minister Kolesnikov was anointed by the Verkhovna Rada (on 11 March 2010) Vice Prime Minister in the Azarov Government (responsible for hosting Euro 2012).

Kolesnikov was not re-appointed in the second Azarov Government and instead kept his mandate in Verkhovna Rada.

Kolesnikov did not participate in the 2014 Ukrainian parliamentary election.

Kolesnikov did participate in the 2019 Ukrainian parliamentary election but did not win a seat in constituency #49 in Druzhkivka. He finished second in this constituency gaining 32.33% of the votes; winner Valerii Hnatenko of the party Opposition Platform — For Life won with 38% of the votes.

In May 2021 Kolesnikov became the political leader of the new party Ukraine is Our Home.

== State activity ==
On 11 March 2010 Borys Kolesnikov was appointed to the position of Vice Prime Minister for Euro 2012. And in December he took the office of the Vice Prime Minister of Ukraine and the Minister of Infrastructure of Ukraine.

=== Euro 2012 ===
The number one task for Kolesnikov as supervisor of preparations for Euro 2012 became protecting Ukrainian rights to host European Football Championship.

In June 2010 the UEFA Supervisory Board decided to approve the country's right to host European Football Championship 2012 in all four Ukrainian cities – Kyiv, Donetsk, Lviv and Kharkiv, which Borys Kolesnikov commented as follows: "Ukraine may fear no more lest any of its cities was suspended from the list of European Football Championship 2012 hosting cities".

Borys Kolesnikov's further work on Euro preparations was related to construction and reconstruction of Ukrainian stadiums and airports, and also development of infrastructure objects.

According to Borys Kolesnikov, the total UEFA EURO preparation expenditure was about $5 bln. "We have built four international level airports in just 18 months. In Kyiv, we have completed the runway and constructed a new terminal. Fifty million euros have been used as operating costs, including for specialist services such as translators, personnel recruitment and training", Borys Kolesnikov said in his interview to an Italian newspaper.

UEFA president and executive committee thanked the vice-prime minister of Ukraine Borys Kolesnikov for the excellent organization of EURO 2012 in Ukraine. "This EURO was a spectacular success at every level. As Vice-Prime Minister you have played a crucial role in ensuring that Ukrainian games are held to the highest standards. I am very grateful to you for your valuable support in the preparation process", Michel Platini, UEFA President, wrote in his letter to Vice-Prime Minister, according to the Ukraine-2012 Infocenter website and Ukrainian IA Interfax.

Speaking about the organization of EURO 2012 Martin Kallen, UEFA Operations Director, said: "It was a great tournament setting new organizational standards for the future".

According to Le Cercle Les Echos, the French newspaper, during the championship Ukraine was visited by many tourists who were very happy with the organization of EURO 2012. The event attracted foreigners to a previously unknown country, which will help develop tourism business in the future.

According to the Research & Branding Group survey, nearly two-thirds of Ukrainians were positively impressed with the championship. Three-quarters of Ukrainians believe that their country hosted EURO 2012 at a high level, and only 12 percent think otherwise.

Opinions:

"Every time I come to Borys Kolesnikov’s office I see all constructions displayed on the monitor of his PC, and he follows them online", said Mr. Tigipko, adding also that he highly estimates efforts made by Mr. Kolesnikov when preparing Ukraine for the European Championship. "It’s very good we keep up with the UEFA schedules, and we fulfil the obligations undertaken, implementation of which had been seriously threatened before. I think it is a personal credit of Borys Kolesnikov, since he is the man actively managing the matters of Euro 2012", stated Serhiy Tihipko.

For quick paces of construction and reconstruction of stadiums and airports UEFA General Secretary Gianni Infantino called him Super-Borys.

According to Kommentari paper “After the Euro 2012 Kolesnikov may become the most popular ‘white-and-blue’ politician. Depending on how successfully will be Euro 2012 hosted in Ukraine, the whole activity of Borys Kolesnikov, the Vice Prime Minister and Minister of Infrastructure, will be evaluated for the whole period of his office in the Cabinet of Ministers”.

=== Ministry of Infrastructure of Ukraine ===
As a head of the Ministry of Infrastructure of Ukraine, in 2010 Borys Kolesnikov defined key priorities of activities and infrastructure development in the following directions:

Public affairs

For the time under the management of Kolesnikov the Ministry of Infrastructure of Ukraine has increased its presence in social networks: from June 2011 the Ministry has been an active user of Facebook social network. A prohibition to photographing at railway stations and airports was raised. Entire ticket: by Euro 2012 one will be able to purchase in Ukraine a ticket for any interurban transport. Starting from June one can pay in payment terminals for railway and bus tickets purchased over the Internet. Insurance benefits for the passengers against traffic accidents now have become twice as much, in 2011 insurance settlement increased up to ₴102,000.

Aviation

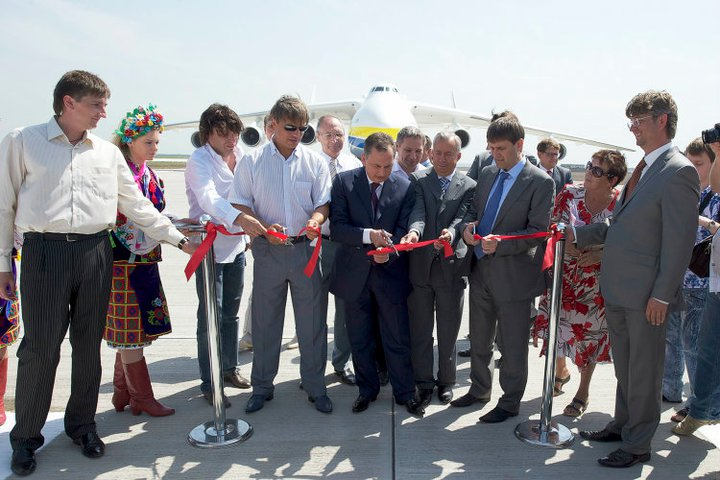
The Greate Opening of a new air-strip in Donetsk

In 2011 a contract was signed with Ilyushyn Finance, CJSC, a leasing company, on supply of first An-158 aircraft.

On 19 May 2011 Kolesnikov presented state enterprise “Antonov” with a certificate to synthetic flight training system of the D level.

On 26 June 2011 – a new flight strip of International Airport in Donetsk (4 km long, 75 m wide, 1 m thick). Now Kolesnikov plans to make full modernization of flight strips at Kharkiv and Lviv airdromes.

New airdrome control tower was launched in Simferopol, it is the first tower built at times of Ukraine's independence.

Railway

Talking about reforming of Ukrainian Railway at the summary press conference "Summing up results of the first half of the year. Development plan of the branch.", Borys Kolesnikov defined three priorities. "First is to forget night train travelling in six years: any location in Ukraine will be reached during a day. And that thanks to new trains again. Second is traffic electrification (“Out of 22,000 kilometres of railroads only a half was electrified, we must increase this figure to 15,000”). Third is locomotive fleet modernization: we still use out-of-date Soviet Fleet".

To implement the plans being shaped, to make high-speed train connection between Kyiv and Ukrainian cities hosting the Euro 2012, at the end of December 2010 a contract was signed with Hyundai Corporation under which Ukrainian Railway obtains 10 new multi-region electric trains. Moreover, first six trains will allow express traffic between Kyiv, Donetsk, Kharkiv and Lviv. For instance, one will be able to get to Kharkiv in 3.5 hrs, Lviv in 4.5 hrs, Donetsk in 5.5–6 hrs.

Kolesnikov is also concentrated on maritime sector of Ukraine, roads and vehicles.

== Assets ==
According to official data Borys Kolesnikov's assets make APK-Invest and Konti, CJSC (Donetsk-based Konti confectionery manufactury).

According to Focus magazine in 2006 Borys Kolesnikov was ranked 10th in the ranking of most influential representatives from Donetsk region. In 2007 Borys Kolesnikov took 20th place in the Top 100 most influential Ukrainian people by Korrespondent magazine.

Last year's (2010) total turnover of Konti and APK-Invest exceeded ₴4 billion. Only the assets of Borys Kolesnikov himself were estimated at $810 million.

== Charity ==
In 2008 Borys Kolesnikov established a registered charitable fund.

By that time charity was made as personal gifts. Beginning from 2004 under his initiative best pupils were granted trips to Disneyland in Paris, foreign trips for war veterans were organized, a reconstruction of Olimpiyskyi regional sport complex in Donetsk was made. Significant means were given to health recovery of children, support of country's cultural inheritance.

According to the Fund aide, today's activity of organization is made within the programs dedicated to development of education, search for and support of gifted and active youth, formation of healthy lifestyle, preservation of country's cultural and historical inheritance and creation of new historical, cultural and scientific values.

At the end of 2010, Borys Kolesnikov's Foundation spent over ₴8 million (US$1 million) for charity. In 2011 the foundation spent more than ₴11 million (US$1.4 million) on the realization of the charitable programs. The funds were used to support S. Krushelnitska National Academic Theatre of Opera and Ballet, the best Ukrainian athletes, health care maintaining and other programs. In 2012 the size of the charitable investment has exceeded over ₴18 million (US$2.2 million), more than ₴10 million (US$1.2 million) were spent on the development of sport. In 2013 Borys Kolesnikov's Foundation was admitted as the leader in the National Rating of Philanthropists in the nomination "Support of sport and physical education".

== Personal life ==
=== Family ===
Kolesnikov was married (a wife Svitlana), had two children: a daughter Kateryna (2004) and a son Kostyantyn (1992).

=== Hobbies ===
Among Kolesnikov's hobbies are association football and hockey. Owing to his passion for hockey in 2010 Kolesnikov bought a hockey club.

"I became a 100% owner of the club in July, in the last year. I always loved hockey, since I was a kid. I remember hockey since the USSR first match played against Canadian professionals on 1 September 1972, since we were dumped the first puck on the first minute. The USSR team won then 7:3", said Kolesnikov to the journalists of Ukrainska Pravda.

== Honours and awards ==
- Deputy Head of the Party of Regions.
- Member of the Political Board of the Party of Regions.
- Deputy Head of the Fraction of the Party of Regions in Verkhovna Rada.
- Member of parliamentary committee for economic policy.
- Member of the Interim special parliamentary committee for elaborating draft laws on amending the Constitution of Ukraine.
- Member of joint committee for cooperation of Verkhovna Rada and Federal assembly of Russian Federation.
- Deputy Head of Ukraine's permanent delegation in the Parliamentary Assembly of the Council of Europe.
- Member of parliamentary group for interparliamentary ties with Japan, Germany, France.
- President of Football Federation of Donetsk region.
- Awarded with the Order of Merit of the II Degree.

== See also ==
- Timeline of Russian interference in the 2016 United States elections
