= List of self-proclaimed republics in Ukraine =

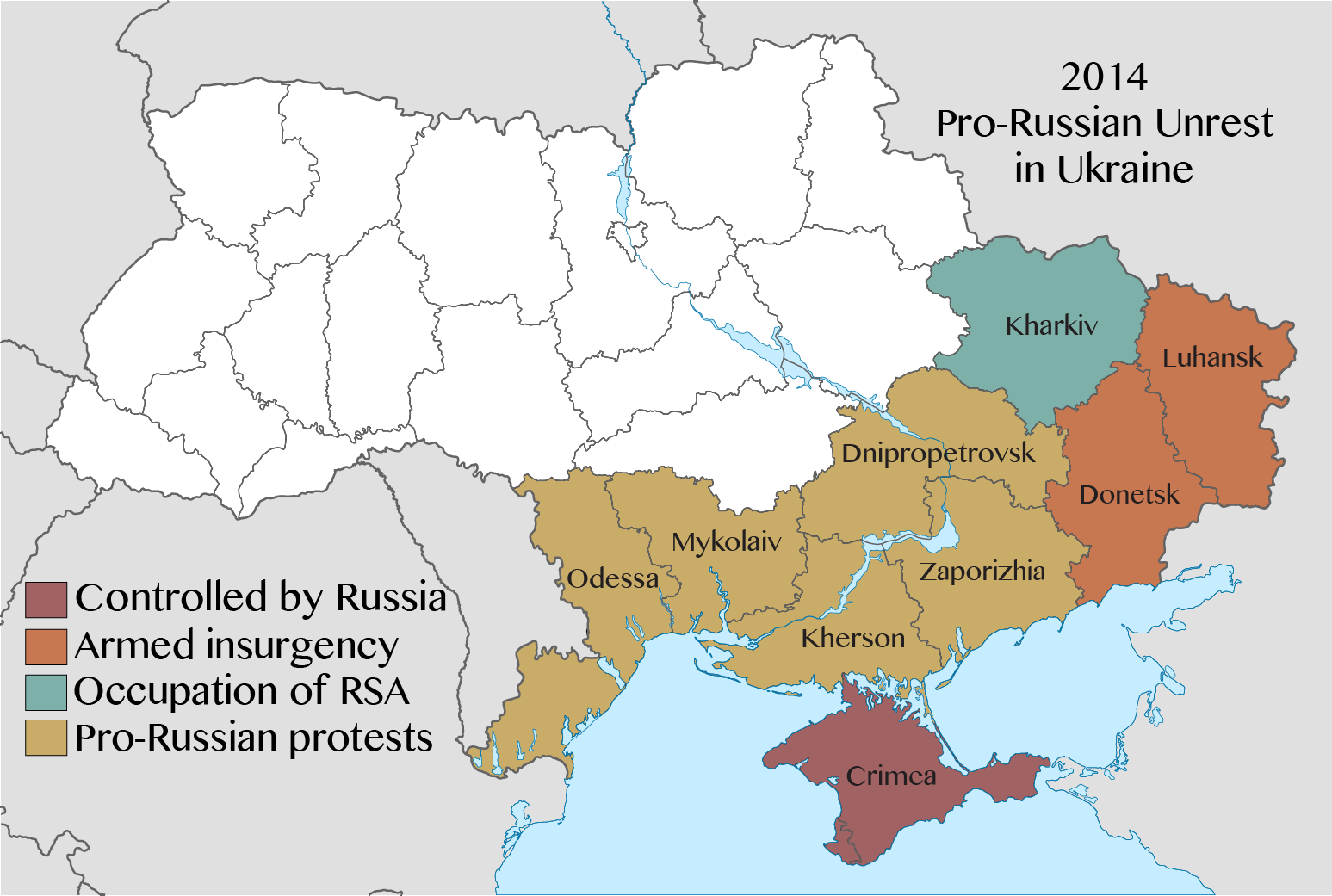
pro-Russian unrest in Ukraine in 2014

This is a list of self-proclaimed republics in Ukraine that emerged following the 2014 Euromaidan Revolution. The establishment of these republics has been a subject of international debate and conflict.

== Background ==
From the end of February 2014, in the aftermath of the Euromaidan and the Revolution of Dignity, which resulted in the ousting of Russian-leaning Ukrainian President Viktor Yanukovych, demonstrations by Russian-backed, pro-Russian, and anti-government groups (as well as pro-government demonstrations) took place in Crimea, Donetsk, Luhansk, Kharkiv and Odesa. The unrest, which was supported by the Russian military and intelligence services, belongs to the early stages of the Russo-Ukrainian War.

== List ==
State	Proclamation	De facto status	Notes
Republic of Crimea (and Sevastopol)	11 March 2014	Republic and Federal City of Russia	On 11 March 2014, the Supreme Council of Crimea and the Sevastopol City Council adopted a joint resolution unilaterally declaring independence from Ukraine, citing the precedent of Kosovo to justify the move to secede. The declaration has been declared illegal and condemned by many nations, notably the European Union, Ukraine and the United States. On 16 March, following a referendum, the Republic was incorporated into Russia, with Sevastopol becoming a federal city.
Donetsk People's Republic	7 April 2014	Republic of Russia	On 6 April 2014, pro-Russian rebel leaders in Donetsk Oblast announced a referendum on joining the Russian Federation, scheduled for no later than 11 May 2014. The following day, a rally of 1,000–2,000 people in Donetsk advocated for a Crimea-style referendum on independence from Ukraine. After the rally, 200–1,000 separatists stormed the Regional State Administration building, demanding a referendum to join Russia. When their demands were not met, the separatists declared the establishment of the Donetsk People's Republic. On 30 September 2022, Russia's president Vladimir Putin announced the annexation of Donetsk, Kherson, Luhansk and Zaporizhzhia oblasts of Ukraine in an address to both houses of the Russian parliament. The United Nations, Ukraine, and many other countries condemned the annexation.
Kharkov People's Republic	7 April 2014	Oblast in Ukraine	On 7 April at a pro-Russian rally in Kharkiv, which gathered near the regional state administration, a list of alternative deputies was announced, which formed the "Council of Deputies of the Kharkov Territorial Community", designed to perform the duties of the Kharkov Regional Council, and the creation of a sovereign Kharkov People's Republic was announced. Two days later, the separatists were forced out of the regional administration building by the Police.
Odessa People's Republic	16 April 2014	Oblast in Ukraine	In Odessa, an internet group "Odessa Anti-Maidan" has declared the Odessa People's Republic, and urged residents to block traffic in the city. The appeal, published on their website, stated that power in the region belonged solely to its inhabitants. Despite these actions, leaders of the Odessa Anti-Maidan denied involvement in the declaration, stating they had no plans to establish such a republic and denied any connection to the website. On 28 October, the SBU said they had foiled a plot to create a People's Republic in the region by the Russian intelligence and security services.
Odessa People's Republic	6 April 2015	Oblast in Ukraine	A document titled "Declaration on the State Sovereignty of the Odessa People’s Republic," was released on April 6, 2015. The declaration cited the events in Kyiv in February 2014 and in Odessa in May 2014 as justification for withdrawing from Ukraine and forming an emergency Cabinet of Ministers. The head of state emphasized that this measure was intended to protect the region from attacks by right-wing radical groups allegedly introduced into the former Odessa region under orders from the Kyiv authorities.
Luhansk People's Republic	27 April 2014	Republic of Russia	On 5 March 2014, following the seizure of the president's office in Kyiv and the flight of Ukrainian President Viktor Yanukovych, a crowd in Luhansk proclaimed Aleksandr Kharitonov as the "People's Governor." Four days later, Kharitonov's supporters stormed the government building, forcing the newly appointed Governor Mykhailo Bolotskykh to resign. On 27 April 2014, pro-Russian activists declared the "Luhansk People's Republic" and demanded amnesty for protesters, official status for the Russian language, and a referendum on Luhansk's status. On 30 September 2022, Russia's president Vladimir Putin announced the annexation of Donetsk, Kherson, Luhansk and Zaporizhzhia oblasts of Ukraine in an address to both houses of the Russian parliament. The United Nations, Ukraine, and many other countries condemned the annexation.
Republic of Stakhanov	14 September 2014	A part of the Luhansk Republic within Russia	The Republic of Stakhanov was a quasi-state republic of Pavel Dryomov on the territory of the city of Stakhanov (now Kadiivka) within the separatist Luhansk People's Republic. At the beginning of the conflict in Eastern Ukraine, Dryomov offered Stakhanov citizens an alternate vision to that of the LPR - a new, socialist neo-Soviet, "Cossack" republic "that works for the poor and elderly". During a speech, he advocated his views and stated "We've had enough corruption and slavery here for a century! We're not fools—neither Poroshenko nor Putin are interested in an honest country!" Nothing would be allowed to get in the way of destiny, he declared: "We will build a Cossack republic right here in Stakhanov!" Pavel Dryomov died on 12 December 2015

== List of attempted or planned proclamations ==
State	Date	Notes
Kiev People's Republic	2014–2015	From March 2014 to January 2015 a VK community distributed materials calling for seizure of power in Ukraine, and called for the creation of the Kyiv People's Republic. On 29 April 2015, the SBU detained two people, seizing computer equipment and separatist campaign materials.
Dnepropetrovsk People's Republic	2014; 2015; 2019	Since 2014, the SBU exposed multiple attempts at a creation of a Dnepropetrovsk People's Republic: On 24 June 2014, six residents detained by the SBU, admitted that their goal was to create a "Dnepropetrovsk People's Republic" in support of local forces in Luhansk and Donetsk regions, with whom they maintained direct contacts. In 2015, the SBU exposed an underground group created by former activists of the Dnepropetrovsk branch of the Communist Party of Ukraine. According to the SBU, the group held meetings in Belgorod. The group was tasked with organizing the Dnepropetrovsk People's Republic and other sabotage groups. In 2019, a representative of the public organization "Dnepropetrovsk Community of Russia" spread calls for the creation of a Dnepropetrovsk People's Republic. According to the representative, he was recruited by the Russian FSB.
Nikolayev People's Republic	2015	in June 2015, a group of 10 people produced and distributed separatist leaflets with a flag of the supposed Mykolaiv People's Republic in Mykolaiv city and Oblast. Two of them were sentenced to five years in prison.
Sumy People's Republic	2015 2017	In 2015, the SBU detained a resident of Nyzhnie Pishchane, who tried to carry out a sabotage during the celebration of the 70th anniversary of the Victory Day over Nazism. During the search, materials of separatist content, including with calls for the creation of the "Sumy People's Republic" and its accession to Russia were seized. In 2017, a resident of the Sumy Oblast was sentenced in absentia to 14 years in prison for attempting to establish a movement aimed at declaring the creation of the Sumy People's Republic.
Rivne Republic	2017	In 2017, an attempt to hold a rally near the Rivne Regional State Administration was made. The participants gathered near the building, but were quickly stopped by law enforcement officers and activists. Posters and leaflets under the slogans "Rivne Republic" were confiscated. According to the Head of the SBU Vasyl Hrytsak, the rally was financed by Mykola Azarov and the Committee for the Salvation of Ukraine.
Zaporozhye People's Republic	2020	In July 2020, the SBU exposed a group advocating for the creation of the republic. According to the investigation done by the SBU, after an unsuccessful attempt to seize power in Zaporizhzhia in the spring of 2014, the group fled to Luhansk, where they helped the local separatist forces. The group members were to return to Zaporizhzhia and wait for further instructions. According to the SBU, ammunition and separatist and communist imagery was seized from the places of residence of the group members.
Khmelnitskiy People's Republic	2021	In 2021, the SBU exposed a criminal network in Khmelnytskyi and Ivano-Frankivsk regions. As reported, the group planned to recruit 500 militants with the purpose of creating the Khmelnitskiy People's Republic. If the current state government would not resign, it would be forcefully overthrown by the group.
