= List of banks in Ukraine =

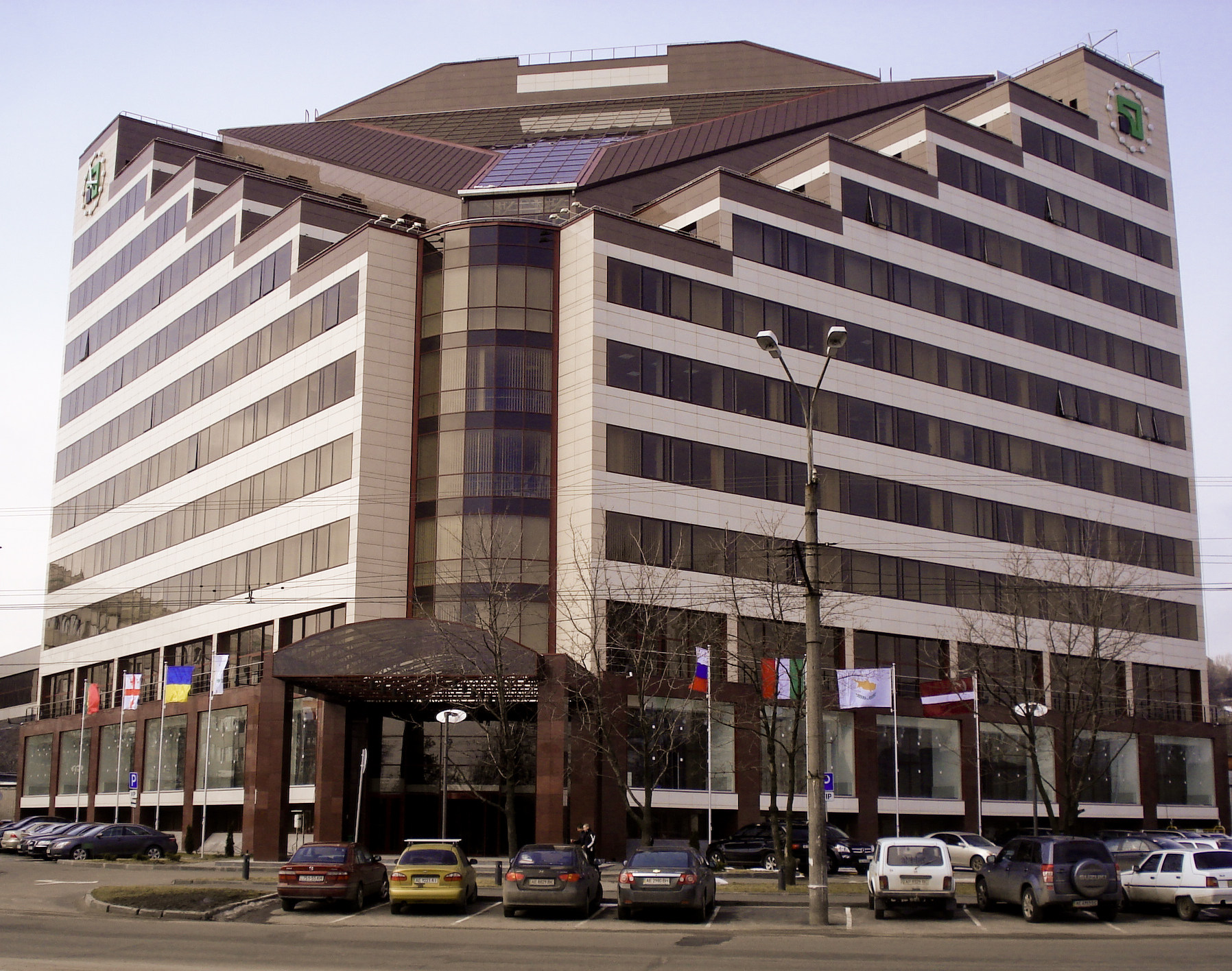
Privatbank head office in Dnipro

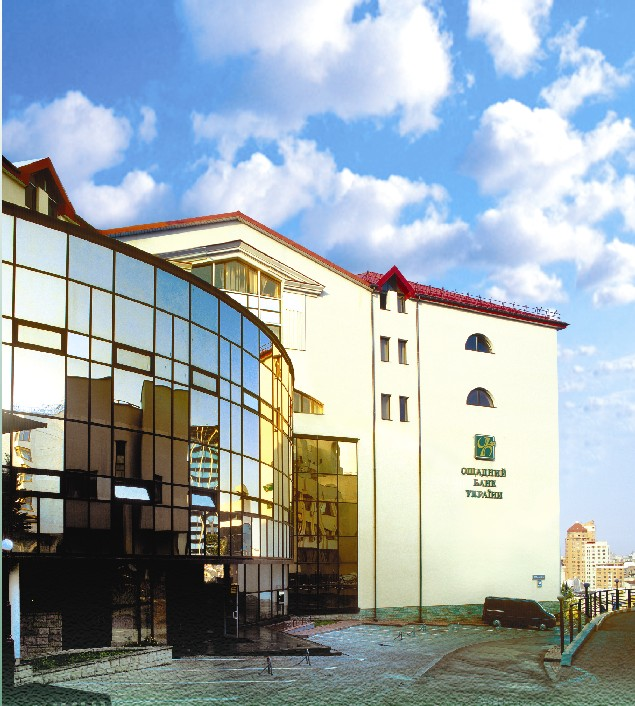
Oschadbank head office in Kyiv

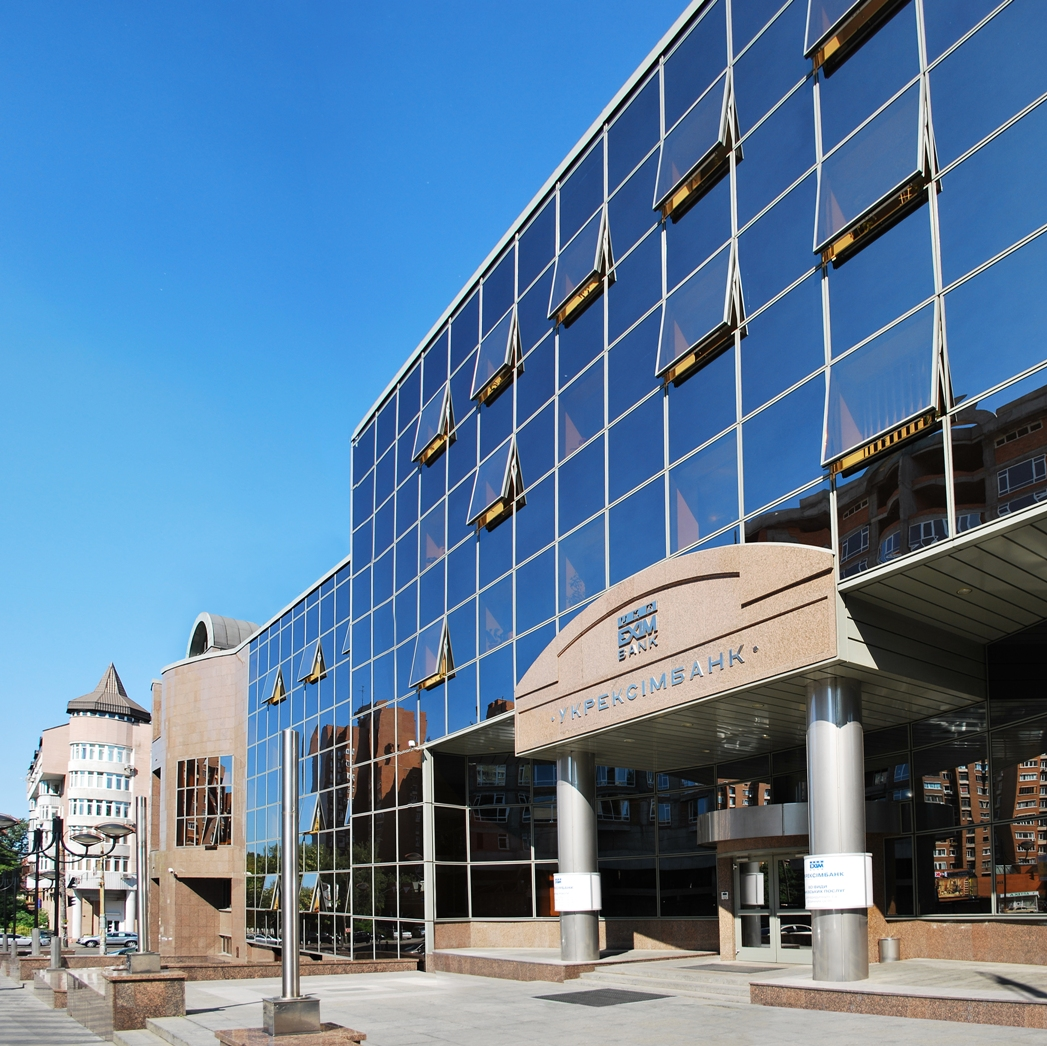
Ukreximbank head office in Kyiv

This is a list of banks in Ukraine. The National Bank of Ukraine (NBU) is the country's central bank and bank supervisor.

== Systemically important banks ==
The NBU updated its list of systemically important banks in June 2025, including 16 banks. They are listed below by decreasing order of size measured in total assets as of 1 January 2026, as reported on the website of the Ministry of Finance.

- CB Privatbank JSC, state-owned
- Oschadbank JSC, state-owned
- First Ukrainian International Bank JSC (FUIB), subsidiary of SCM
- Ukreximbank JSC, state-owned
- Ukrgasbank JSB, state-owned
- Raiffeisen Bank JSC, subsidiary of Raiffeisen Bank International (Austria)
- Universal Bank JSC, subsidiary of TAS Group
- Ukrsibbank JSC, subsidiary of BNP Paribas (France)
- Sense Bank JSC, state-owned
- OTP Bank JSC, subsidiary of OTP Group (Hungary)
- Credit Agricole Bank JSC, subsidiary of Crédit Agricole (France)
- KredoBank JSC, subsidiary of PKO Bank Polski (Poland)
- Pivdennyi JSB, controlled by Yuriy Rodin
- Taskombank JSC, subsidiary of TAS Group
- A-Bank JSC, controlled by Hryhoriy Surkis
- Idea Bank JSC, subsidiary of Getin Holding (Poland)

The prominence of state-owned banks in the list results from the public recapitalization of Ukrgasbank in 2009, the nationalization of PrivatBank in 2016, and that of Sense Bank (formerly a sister company of Russia's Alfa-Bank) in 2023. By contrast, Oschadbank and Ukreximbank, both successors to Soviet-era institutions, have been fully state-owned since their establishment.

The Ministry of Finance lists Renaissance Credit alongside FUIB with identical numbers, reflecting the fact that FUIB purchased the Ukrainian activities of Renaissance Credit in 2013, and in 2014 was made assignee of all rights and obligations of Renaissance Credit Ukraine in relation to its clients, partners and counterparties.

== Other commercial banks ==
43 other banks were licensed by the NBU as of 2 June 2026. They are listed below by decreasing size of total assets as ranked by the Finance Ministry as of 1 January 2026, except the last one (IuteBank) which only started operations in March 2026.

- Citibank Ukraine, subsidiary of Citigroup (United States)
- Procredit Bank Ukraine, subsidiary of ProCredit Holding (Germany)
- VST Bank (formerly Vostok Bank)
- Bank Credit Dnipro, controlled by Oleksandr Yaroslavskyi
- ING Bank Ukraine, subsidiary of ING Group (Netherlands)
- MTB Bank
- Accordbank, controlled by Danylo Mefodiyovych Volynets
- Globus Bank
- Radabank
- Alliance Bank, controlled by Oleksandr Yosypovych Sosis
- Bank Lviv, bought by Crédit Agricole (France) in 2026
- Pravex Bank, subsidiary of Intesa Sanpaolo (Italy)
- Deutsche Bank Ukraine, subsidiary of Deutsche Bank (Germany)
- SEB Corporate Bank, subsidiary of SEB Group (Sweden)
- Piraeus Bank MKB, subsidiary of Piraeus Bank (Greece)
- Bank KD / Clearing House Bank
- International Investment Bank, controlled by Petro Poroshenko and Igor Kononenko
- Cominbank, controlled by Stephen Paul Pinter
- Asvio Bank
- Bizbank (Bank of Investments and Savings)
- Poltava-Bank, controlled by Oleksandr Nekrasov
- Unex Bank, controlled by Tomáš Fiala
- Ukrainian Capital Bank
- Sky Bank
- Agroprosperis Bank
- Industrialbank, controlled by the Dvoretsky family
- Bank 3/4
- Altbank
- Crystalbank
- Creditwest Bank
- Bank Grant
- Europrombank
- Metabank, controlled by Larysa Mykolayivna Nosyk
- Credit Europe Bank, subsidiary of Nexent Bank (Turkey)
- Avangard Bank, subsidiary of Investment Capital Ukraine
- Oxy Bank, controlled by Oleg Grigorievich Balyash
- Polycombank
- Ukrainian Bank for Reconstruction and Development
- Family Bank, controlled by Borys Komisaruk
- BTA Bank, subsidiary of BTA Bank (Kazakhstan)
- Trust Capital Bank, controlled by Iryna Kravchenko
- First Investment Bank (Pinbank), nationalized in 2023
- IuteBank, subsidiary of Iute Group (Estonia)

The Finance Ministry also listed Motor-Bank, which was absorbed by Asvio Bank in early 2026.

== Virtual banks ==
Virtual bank (also often referred to as "Mobile bank", "Digital bank" or "neobank") in Ukraine is currently a type of bank that operates on the basis of a license from another (parental) bank. Such banks position themselves in the market as separate banking institutions with a different marketing and pricing policy, but from a legal standpoint, they continue to operate on behalf of the parent institution, so their financial condition remains completely dependent on the financial condition of the parent bank.

List of virtual banks of Ukraine as of August 31, 2021
#	Bank name	Website	License holder	Legal name in Ukrainian
1	Monobank	monobank.ua	Universal Bank	Публічне акціонерне товариство «Універсал Банк»
2	O.Bank	obank.com.ua	Idea Bank	Акціонерне товариство «Ідея Банк»
3	Sportbank	sportbank.ua	Oksi Bank; Tascombank	Публічне акціонерне товариство «Оксі Банк» Акціонерне товариство «Таскомбанк»
4	BVR (Bank Vlasny Rakhunok)	bvr.ua	Bank Vostok	Публічне акціонерне товариство «Банк Восток»
5	izibank	izibank.ua	Tascombank	Акціонерне товариство «Таскомбанк»
6	neobank	neobank.one	Concord Bank	Акціонерне товариство «Акціонерний комерційний банк «Конкорд»

== Defunct banks ==
Banks established in Ukraine since incipient liberalization in the late 1980s and now defunct are listed below, in chronological order of establishment. Many were closed between 2014 and 2017 by the NBU under its then-governor Valeria Hontareva, in the wake of the Revolution of Dignity.

- UkrInBank (1989-2015), liquidated
- Agroprombank Ukraine (1990-2001), liquidated
- Finance and Credit Bank (1990-2015), liquidated
- Megabank (1990-2022), liquidated
- Pivdenkombank (1990-2014), liquidated
- Rodovid Bank (1990-2016), liquidated
- Ukrsotsbank (1990-2019), merged into Alfa-Bank Ukraine
- Expobank (1991-2014), liquidated
- Fidobank (1991-2016), liquidated
- RwS Bank (1991-2025), liquidated
- VS Bank (1991-2018), absorbed by Tascombank
- Basis Bank (1992-2020), liquidated
- BrokBusinessBank (1992-2014), liquidated
- Demark Bank (1992-2014), liquidated
- Dongorbank (1992-2010), acquired by FUIB
- Prominvestbank (1992-2022), liquidated
- Ukrainian Professional Bank (1992-2015), liquidated
- VAB Bank (1992-2014), liquidated
- Arkada Bank (1993-2020), liquidated
- Bank Kyiv (1993-2015), liquidated
- Diamantbank (1993-2017), liquidated
- Khreshchatyk Bank (1993-2016), liquidated
- Nadra Bank (1993-2015), liquidated
- Zakhidinkombank (1993-2014), liquidated
- Bank Forum (1994-2014), liquidated
- BG Bank (1994-2014), liquidated
- Imexbank (1994-2015), liquidated
- Kievan Rus Bank (1996-2015), liquidated
- National Credit Bank (1996-2015), liquidated
- Terra Bank (1996-2014), liquidated
- Kreditprombank (1997-2013), absorbed by Delta Bank
- Fortuna Bank (2002-2017), liquidated
- Financial Initiative Bank (2004-2015), liquidated
- Ukrbudinvestbank (2004-2023), liquidated
- Platinum Bank (2005-2017), liquidated
- VTB Bank Ukraine (2005-2018), subsidiary of VTB Bank
- CityCommerce Bank (2006-2014), liquidated
- Concord Bank (2006-2023), liquidated
- Delta Bank (2006-2015), liquidated
- ForwardBank (2006-2023), liquidated
- RD Bank (2006-2012), liquidated
- Renaissance Credit Ukraine (2006-2014), absorbed by FUIB
- Sberbank Ukraine (2007-2022), liquidated
- AktaBank (2008-2014), liquidated
- Zlatobank (2008-2015), liquidated
- All-Ukrainian Development Bank (2009-2014), liquidated
- Apex-Bank (2009-2017), ceased banking operations
- Avant-Bank (2009-2016), liquidated
- Radical Bank (2009-2015), liquidated
- Bank Mykhailivsky (2013-2016), liquidated
- Sportbank (2019-2024), absorbed by its parent Tascombank

== See also ==
- Banking in Ukraine
- Economy of Ukraine
- List of companies of Ukraine
- List of banks in Europe
