= Oleksandr Ihnatenko (banker) =

Ukrainian banker (born 1977)

- Born: July 18, 1977 (age 49); Ukraine
- Education: Taras Shevchenko National University of Kyiv,
- Occupation: Banker
- Known for: Board member of Ukrgasbank and Ukreximbank and involvement in film crew assault scandel

Oleksandr Ihnatenko (July 1977, 18) is a Ukrainian banker, former deputy chairman of the board of Ukrgasbank, board member of Ukreximbank, and a figure in the scandal involving the assault on the filming crew of the investigative journalism program Schemes and the NABU investigation into the Ukrgasbank case, responsible for conducting multi-billion dollar corrupt payments for arms procurement abroad.

== Biography ==
In 1999, Oleksandr Ihnatenko graduated from the Institute of International Relations at the Taras Shevchenko National University of Kyiv with a degree in international economic relations and as a translator from English.

He began working in the banking sector at Crédit Agricole Bank in April 2009. From April 2013 to June 2014, he held the position of director of the center at UkrSibbank for working with large clients in the agro-industrial complex. From 2015, he served as deputy and later director of the department at Ukrgasbank. In July 2017, he became the deputy chairman of the board of Ukrgasbank.

From March 30, 2020, he was a board member of Ukreximbank and resigned on August 16, 2023, at his own request.

The former editor of Economic Truth, Serhiy Lyamets, stated that Ihnatenko was placed at Ukrgasbank by Mikhail Beylin with the help of the then head of the Presidential Administration of Ukraine, Boris Lozhkin.

== Controversy ==
=== Assault on Schemes film crew ===
In October 2021, an assault occurred on the film crew of the Schemes project during an interview with the head of Ukreximbank Yevhen Metzger. A journalist's question about a $60 million loan to businessman Serhiy Bryukhovetsky, who has business in the DNR, angered Metzger, and he ordered the bank's security chief, Ihor Telbizov, to seize the camera and delete the interview recording. Oleksandr Ihnatenko was responsible for issuing this loan. Journalists' investigations indicate that Serhiy Bryukhovetsky might be a figurehead, while the actual beneficiary of the $60 million loan for the purchase of the Sky Mall shopping center, for which Oleksandr Ihnatenko was responsible, was one of the most influential leaders of the Odesa criminal world, Volodymyr Galanternik. He became known in the 1990s as a member of the criminal group of Oleksandr Angert, better known by the nickname "Angel".

After an internal investigation, Telbizov was allowed to return to work, and Ihnatenko organized applause during the security chief's meeting with the bank's employees.

=== Investigation in the Ukrgasbank case ===
In October 2022, Ukrainian investigative authorities reported uncovering illegal activities by the management of the state-owned Ukrgasbank. At that time, charges were brought against the main suspects, including former head Kyrylo Shevchenko and former board member Oleksandr Ihnatenko, who were accused of signing fictitious contracts with alleged bank agents. From 2014 to 2020, the bank suffered losses amounting to 206 million hryvnias. On October 31, 2022, the court set a bail of 40 million hryvnias for Ihnatenko. He was also required to appear before investigative authorities and the court upon request, notify of any changes in residence or work, avoid contact with other suspects and witnesses, and surrender his passport.

In November 2023, the High Anti-Corruption Court of Ukraine approved a plea deal with Oleksandr Ihnatenko, who agreed to charges of official negligence, resulting in a fine of 51,000 hryvnias.

Journalists speculated that the case was opened to exert political pressure on former NBU head Kyrylo Shevchenko, who had been in a prolonged conflict with the President's Office. According to media reports, several episodes from Ihnatenko's biography were used for leverage:

- The case of criminal Galanternik, who legalized funds from illegal operations with land plots in Odesa through a loan from Ukreximbank, issued by Oleksandr Ihnatenko.
- The purchase of a Bentley Continental GT, the cost of which did not match Ihnatenko's official income.
- Connections with another NABU suspect, the notorious restaurateur Mikhail Beylin, who was involved in scandals related to land seizures, raiding, and paying "envelope wages" to government officials from the Presidential Administration.
- Conducting payments to dubious contractors for arms procurement for the Armed Forces of Ukraine abroad – specifically, the NABU case involving the Polish company "Alfa Sp zo.o", which funneled billions of hryvnias out of Ukraine.

=== Corrupt arms procurement contracts abroad ===
Through Ukreximbank, defense contracts were conducted, and the person directly responsible for signing these contracts was then board member Oleksandr Ihnatenko. According to banking standards, the bank's currency control and financial monitoring not only review the contracts with foreign contractors but also check them against several criteria, including "business purpose" and "economic feasibility". However, such a check was not carried out by Ukreximbank, particularly regarding the Polish company "Alfa Sp z o.o", which delayed the delivery of weapons to Ukraine amounting to almost €96 million. The Polish Alfa is engaged in non-specialized wholesale trade, does not publish tax reports, and was even involved in a criminal case for supplying substandard equipment. However, this did not prevent Ukreximbank from conducting the relevant payments. Despite indications of criminal activity by the banker, Oleksandr Ihnatenko has not yet been interrogated in this case.

=== Stake in stevedoring business ===
Most of the amount set as bail for the arrested Ihnatenko in the Ukrgasbank case was paid by LLC "Flybridge", a structural company of the "Orexym" group, owned by former BPP deputy Borys Kozir and Yuriy Budnyk. Oleksandr Ihnatenko owns 12% of LLC "Stevedoring Investment Company", which is part of the "Orexym" group of companies. In 2018, the SBU investigated the case of abuses by officials of Ukrgasbank (including Ihnatenko, who at that time held the position of director of the corporate banking department) in issuing loans to commercial structures, including LLC "Stevedoring Investment Company". The fact that the state banker Ihnatenko obtained a stake in this company indicates his self-serving motives when deciding to issue a loan to this company.

Another episode of cooperation between Ihnatenko and the "Orexym" group is the sale of the grain transshipment port "Mykolaiv Grain Products Plant". The "Orexym" group attracted a loan from the Black Sea Trade and Development Bank amounting to €31 million for the construction of a grain terminal. When selling this asset to Korean investors for $36 million, the mentioned loan was repaid to the Black Sea Bank, with which Ukrgasbank had joint cooperation programs. The position of Oleksandr Ihnatenko initially at Ukrgasbank and then at "Ukreximbank" allowed him to facilitate the connection of contacts with the Black Sea Bank and the Korean Eximbank to find potential buyers for the asset, attract a financial institution to pay for the deal, coordinate details between the banks, and directly involve Ukreximbank in the deal in the interests of "Orexym", of which Ihnatenko would later become a co-owner.

=== Perfume smuggling to Russia ===
Oleksandr Ihnatenko owns 51% of LLC "Jewelry House "Dynasty" and 33% of LLC "Crist". Both companies are engaged in the wholesale trade of jewelry and watches. Ihnatenko acquired shares in these LLCs in 2021 and 2020, respectively. His partner in LLC "Crist" is Kostyantyn Stolyar, who owns 100% of the related business PP "Brand Parfums" (wholesale trade in perfumes). In 2020, Stolyar was a figure in a criminal case regarding the smuggling of perfumes in especially large quantities. The SBU established that Stolyar organized a scheme for smuggling perfumes through the Ukrainian-Polish border, bribing customs and border guards, and further illegal export of contraband to Moscow. Overall, more than 10 people were involved in the scheme organized by Ihnatenko's partner.
