= Kostiantyn Koshelenko =

Kostiantyn Borysovych Koshelenko
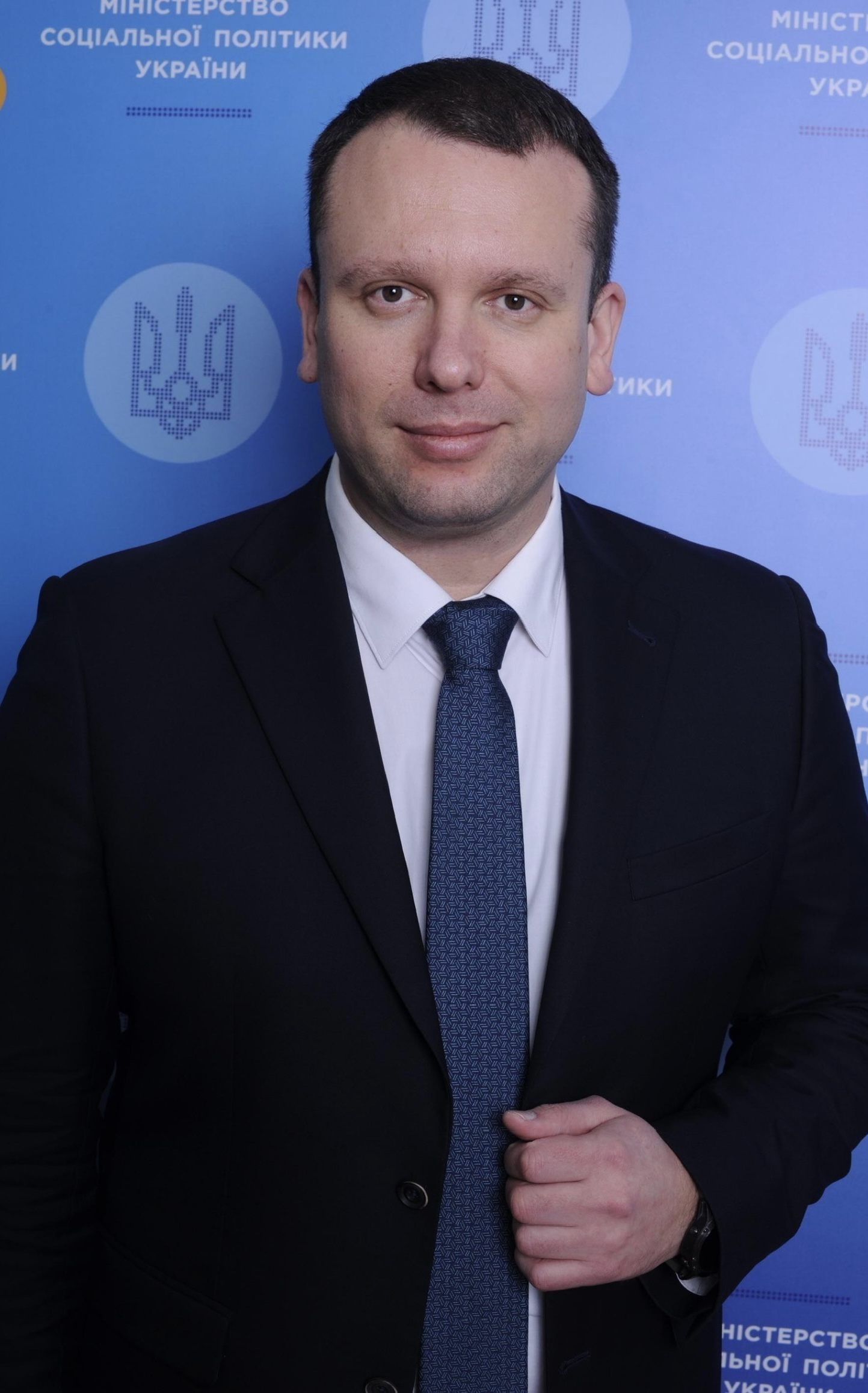

Deputy Minister of Social Policy of Ukraine for Digital Development, Digital Transformations, and Digitalization
- Incumbent
- Assumed office December 29, 2021

Personal details
- Born: July 7, 1983 (42 years old) Zaporizhzhia, Ukraine
- Education: MBA from Kyiv-Mohyla Business School, Diploma from Ukrainian Corporate Governance Academy
- Alma mater: Zaporizhzhia National Technical University, Kyiv-Mohyla Academy
- Occupation: Public official

Kostiantyn Borysovych Koshelenko (Ukrainian: Костянтин Борисович Кошеленко; born July 7, 1983) is a Ukrainian top-manager and public official, the Director of Business Development for Public Sector Engagement in Eastern Europe and Ukraine at Mastercard. He was the Deputy Minister of Social Policy of Ukraine for Digital Development, Digital Transformations, and Digitalization ( 2021-2025).

== Education ==
Koshelenko holds degrees in Finance and Computer Systems and Networks from Zaporizhzhia National Technical University and in Management of Organizations and Administration from the National University of Kyiv-Mohyla Academy. He also earned an MBA from the Kyiv-Mohyla Business School and a diploma from the Ukrainian Corporate Governance Academy.

== Career ==
Koshelenko began his career in 2004 at LLC "Energoautomatyzatsiya," where he developed and implemented automated management systems for the Zaporizhstal enterprise. From 2006 to 2015, he worked at PJSC "Delta Bank," where he held several roles, including deputy head of the Sales and Development Department and director of the Alternative Sales Channels Department.

In 2015–2016, Koshelenko led the Sales Management Division at PJSC "Industrial-Investment Commercial Bank." He later worked as the Director of Retail Sales in the Kyiv region at PJSC Bank "TRUST" and served as its Acting Chairman of the Board from 2016 to 2017. Between 2017 and 2019, he was the Business Director of "EasyPay" and deputy chairman of the Board of Forward Bank.

=== Political career ===
From 2019 to 2021, Koshelenko served as deputy chairman of the State Property Fund of Ukraine, where he coordinated regional networks and attracted investment.

From 2021 to 2025, Koshelenko was appointed Deputy Minister of Social Policy of Ukraine, where he has led efforts to develop the Unified Information System of the Social Sector and create online services for citizens.

In 2023 and 2024 Kostiantyn Koshelenko has organized the Global Digital Forum. He also initiated the bill for the Unified Information System of the Social Sector and the launch of the social portal soc.gov.ua. He is the ideologist behind the creation of the Unified State Platform for Adoption and Childcare dity.gov.ua.

He is the ideologist behind the єHelp (Ukrainian: єДопомога) platform, which has received awards for its contribution to the development of digital services in Ukraine. He is one of the leaders of the adoption project within Diia and other projects aimed at integrating new social services into the Diia platform.

In 2024, Koshelenko published Management in Times of War. Leadership, Efficiency, and Resilience. The book focuses on leadership and maintaining productivity during unstable conditions, drawing from Koshelenko's wartime experience in Ukraine. It includes contributions from 40 Ukrainian and international managers across various industries. In May 2025, the book was published in Switzerland.

In 2025, Koshelenko became the Director of Business Development for Public Sector Engagement in Eastern Europe and Ukraine at Mastercard.

Kostiantyn Koshelenko is honorary professor at Alfred Nobel University. He is a member of the Expert Council of Alumni at the Kyiv-Mohyla Business School. Koshelenko also serves as an expert and is a member of the jury for various competitions, including FinAwards 2022 and PSM Awards 2023, and a keynote speaker at specialized conferences like State of Emergency: Democracy and Digital Transformation in Times of War, P19 Payment Award, Digital & Technology: Digital Solutions for Recovery, Global Summit Mission Peace 2022 etc.

== Bibliography ==
- Koshelenko, Kostiantyn (28 August 2024). Management in Times of War: Leadership Examples from Ukraine's Government and Private Sector. Helion. ISBN 979-8-8718-3057-4.
