= Management in Times of War =

Management in Times of War: Leadership Examples from Ukraine's Government and Private Sector
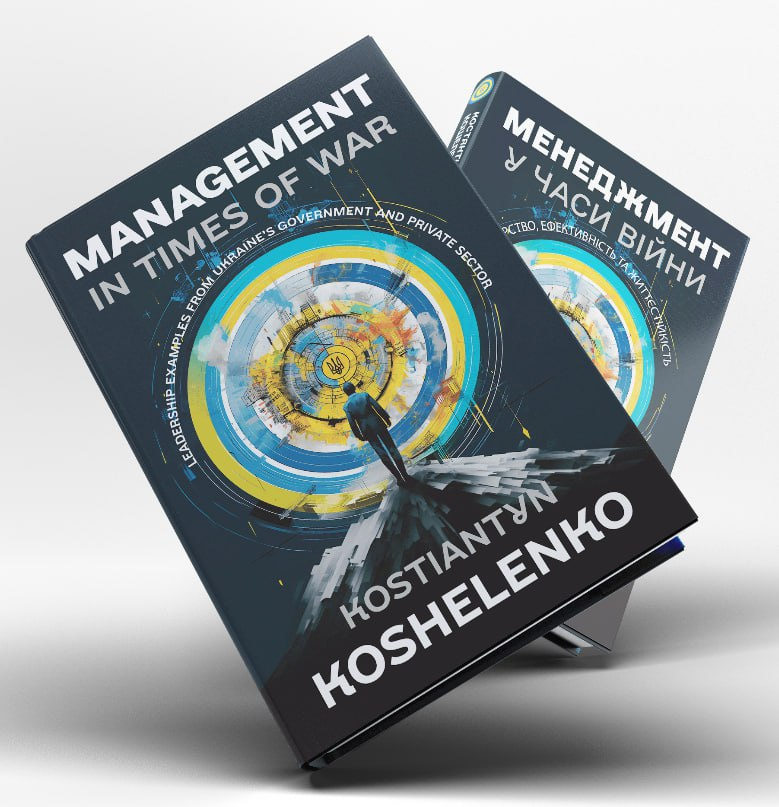
- Author: Kostiantyn Koshelenko
- Original title: Менеджмент у часи війни. Лідерство, ефективність та життєстійкість
- Language: English, Ukrainian, Swedish
- Publisher: Helion
- Publication date: August 28, 2024
- Pages: 306
- ISBN: 979-8-8718-3057-4

Management in Times of War: Leadership Examples from Ukraine's Government and Private Sector is a bestseller by Ukrainian public figure Kostiantyn Koshelenko, published in 2024. The book is a collection of tools and ideas aimed at supporting productivity, team development, and adherence to values amidst the chaos of war.

== Overview ==
The book focuses on management during extreme crises, particularly during Russia's invasion of Ukraine. It presents the author's tools and concepts for maintaining productivity, team development, and adhering to personal values in conditions of instability. Koshelenko draws his reflections from his experience managing the digital transformation of Ukraine's social sector during the war. In May 2025, Swedish-language version of the book was published in Sweden.

In addition to Kostiantyn Koshelenko, 40 managers from Ukraine and other countries who work in fields such as logistics, government, banking, information technology, insurance, security, sports, and commerce share their crisis management experiences. The book provides practical advice on applying management practices in difficult circumstances with limited resources.

== Reviews ==
The book has been positively reviewed by Oleksandr Novikov, Head of the National Agency for Corruption Prevention; Ian Bremmer, President of Eurasia Group; Daniel F. Runde, author of The American Imperative: Reclaiming Global Leadership through Soft Power; and David Rogers, a leading expert on digital transformation and author of The Digital Transformation Playbook.

"A good and interesting book. Its strength lies in the perspective it offers, which is summarized in the title. It resonates with much of what I teach at The Open University Business School and my experience managing large teams, even though I am not in a war-torn country. This book will appeal to both practitioners and management students. Leadership has a vast contextual aspect that requires deep discussion during wartime — this book enriches that knowledge and is a valuable contribution from the author." — Antonio Garcia, lecturer at The Open University, a former officer in the South African National Defence Force, and co-author of Number 788.

“In a crisis, the nonessential falls away, and what remains is what truly matters. Management in Times of War explores how Ukrainian leaders applied an Essentialist mindset in responding to the challenges of war. While they did not choose the circumstances they faced, they retained agency in how they responded. As the conflict continues, these leaders will need to adapt to evolving conditions. The book examines the decisions they have made and the challenges that lie ahead.” — Greg McKeown, author of Essentialism and Effortless
