= Mykola Lahun =

Ukrainian businessman

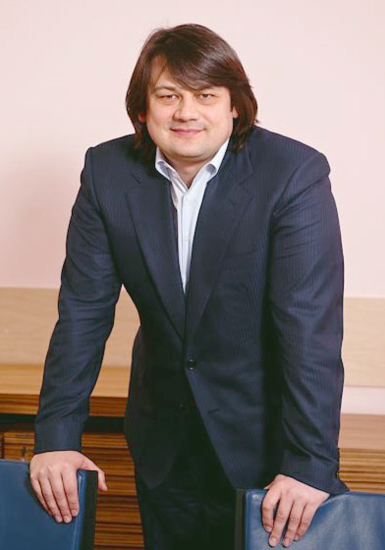
- Born: 1973 (age 52–53); Semenovka village (Cherkassy region, Ukraine)
- Education: Kyiv National Economic University
- Occupation: Banker
- Employer: Delta Bank

Mykola Lahun (Ukrainian: Микола Лагун) — is the Ukrainian businessman. He was the majority shareholder and the Chairman of the Supervisory Board of JSC Delta Bank, which declared insolvent on 2 March 2015.

== Biography ==
Mykola Lahun was born in Semenovka village (Cherkassy region, Ukraine) in 1973.

=== Education ===
- After school he entered Kiev Frunze Higher Military Command College and studied there for 3 years on the Reconnaissance Faculty.
- In 1996 Nikolay graduated from the Kyiv National Economic University.
- In 2001 he got an academic degree of Candidate of Economic Sciences.

=== Career ===
- Mykola Lahun began his career in year 1994 on the position of economist in Supervision Department of National Bank of Ukraine.
- After the National Bank worked in the customer service of PSA Bank (now - VAB) from 1994 to 1998. Then moved to Urksotsbank on the position of Head of the Money Markets of the Treasury Department, and later became the Head of the Treasury.
- In year 2002 the owner of "Ukrsotsbank" Valery Khoroshkovsky sold to Mykola Lahun 10% of the bank shares.
- In year 2005, one year later after "Ukrsotsbank" the bank was sold to Victor Pinchuk, Mykola Lahun was appointed as the Vice Chairman of the Board by the new shareholder. The same year Mykola Lahun made a decision to open his own business.
- In summer of year 2005 Mykola Lahun bought from Foxtrot Company the credit union "Favorit". The union was engaged to retail crediting. At that time the trading network of "Favorit" totaled 450 outlets. In February year 2006 Mykola Lahun registered "Delta Bank" with authorized capital of $60 million. The bank was, focused on retail express crediting. In a year the assets of "Delta Bank" exceeded ₴1 billion, and in 2 years "Delta Bank" occupied about a quarter of the segment of retail crediting. The new bank made the serious competition for already existed participants of the market of express crediting such as "PrivatBank", "Praveks-Bank", "Nadra Bank", "Societe Generale", and Russian bank "Lider" ( "Renaissance Capital" Group, Moscow) as well.
- In year 2006 Mykola Lahun became the laureate of the award "The Person of the Year" in the nomination "The Financier of the Year". This year he also won in the nomination "Consumer Crediting" in a rating "TOP 100. The Best Top Managers of Ukraine".
- In year 2007 Mykola Lahun announced about the purchase of 100% of shares of Belarusian "Atom Bank". This way he entered the Belarusian market of consumer crediting.
- Since 2008 Mykola Lahun held a position of the Chairman of the Supervisory Board of "Delta Bank". The booming bank drew attention of foreign investors and in year 2008 the large European banking group estimated "Delta Bank" at seven capitals that is nearly $800 million. However, the transaction didn't take place. Same year Mykola Lahun became the winner of the award "The Person of the Year" in the nomination "The Financier of the Year".
- In year 2009 Mykola Lahun created a finance company in Vietnam which he sold to investors in year 2010.
- In year 2010 Mykola Lahun changed his business strategy and decided that "Delta Bank" should be a universal bank. Same year Delta Bank acquired the credit portfolio of retail and corporate clients of LLM Ukrprombank according to the results of competition. It allowed "Delta Bank" to enter a corporate segment quickly.
- In the middle of the year 2011 Mykola Lahun attracted to the business very powerful partner the American company "Cargill". The stocks of "Delta Bank" were distributed in next way – the owner of 70% is Mykola Lahun, the rest remained to "Cargill".
- At the end of year 2011 Mykola Lahun bought the credit portfolio of "Ukrsibbank" with a nominal cost of ₴4.8 billion. In 2011 Mykola Lahun placed the 3rd position in the rating of business weekly edition «BUSINESS» in the nomination "The Banker of the Year" (he headed this rating twice – in year 2012 and year 2013).
- According to the results of year 2012 Mykola Lahun took the 1st place in the nomination «Recognition of Colleagues» within the All-Ukrainian annual award UKRAINIAN BANKER AWARDS of the Investgazeta edition and the 3rd place according to the results of year 2013. Also in year 2012 Mykola Lahun placed the 1st position in the nomination "The Best Top Manager of Bank-2012"of "Kommersant" newspaper rating and the 2nd – in the same nomination by the results of year 2013 in the annual rating "50 Leading Banks of Ukraine".
- In year 2013 were completed next three buying transactions by Mykola Lahun's group of assets - "Creditprombank" (the 20th bank in the Ukrainian banking system by the size of assets), "Swedbank" (assets – 5,6 billion), and "Astra Bank" (₴1.85 billion).
- According to the results of year 2013 the businessman was awarded several times. PH4 "Galytski Kontrakty " acknowledged the banker as "The Best Top Manager of the Bank with Ukrainian Capital-2013" and "The Most Recognizable Banker-2013". Mykola Lahun was named "The Most Solvent Banker" by "TOP BANKERS OF THE LAST FIVE YEARS" rating of the newspaper "Capital" in year 2013.
- Following According to the results of June, year 2014 "Delta Bank" placed the 2nd position among non-state Ukrainian banks and the 4th in the general rating by the size of assets (₴61.5 billion for 01.07.2014). "Delta Bank" placed the 3rd position in the rating of Ukrainian banks by the size of deposit portfolio of private persons (₴21.9 billion for 01.07.2014). Delta Bank's profit for the 1st half of year 2014 is ₴192.9 million. "Delta Bank" served more than 4 million clients as of 01.07.2014.

== Assets ==
- JSC "Delta Bank";
- "Delta CAPITAL";
- "Delta Strahuvannya";
- "Delta"
