= Oleksiy Movchan =

Ukrainian politician

- Олексій Мовчан
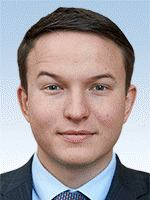

People's Deputy of Ukraine
- Incumbent
- Assumed office 29 August 2019
- Preceded by: Kostyantyn Zhevago
- Constituency: Poltava Oblast, No. 150

Personal details
- Born: 12 February 1994 (age 32) Kremenchuk, Ukraine
- Party: Servant of the People
- Other political affiliations: Independent
- Education: National University of Kyiv-Mohyla Academy; Ukrainian Catholic University

Oleksiy Vasylovych Movchan (Ukrainian: Олексій Васильович Мовчан; born 12 February 1994) is a Ukrainian politician currently serving as a People's Deputy of Ukraine representing Ukraine's 150th electoral district from Servant of the People since 2019.

== Early life and career ==
Oleksiy Vasylovych Movchan was born on 2 December 1994 in the city of Kremenchuk, in Ukraine's Poltava Oblast. He is a graduate of the National University of Kyiv-Mohyla Academy (specialising in finance and credit), the Ukrainian Catholic University (specialising in public administration), and the Kyiv School of Economics (specialising in public administration).

Prior to being election, Movchan was deputy head of Prozorro for project and programme management from 2017 to 2019. He is also a member of the Club of Young Reformers non-governmental organisation, as well as founder of the Pryntsyp NGO. He was a semi-finalist of the Open Data Challenge, as well as a participant in the "New Leaders" programme on the ICTV channel.

== Political career ==
=== Election campaigns ===
In the 2019 Ukrainian parliamentary election, Movchan ran to be a People's Deputy of Ukraine in Ukraine's 150th electoral district as the candidate of Servant of the People. At the time of the election, he was an independent. He was successfully elected, defeating independent incumbent Kostyantyn Zhevago with 42.54% of the vote to Zhevago's 23.72%. Movchan's election was significant for marking Zhevago's first electoral defeat since first becoming a People's Deputy in the 1998 Ukrainian parliamentary election.

=== Parliamentarian service ===
In the Verkhovna Rada, Movchan joined the Servant of the People faction and became a member of the Verkhovna Rada Economic Development Committee. He is also a member of the inter-factional associations "Ukrainians in the World", ECONOMICS.NOW, and For Accelerated Eurointegration of Ukrainian Businesses.

=== Official foreign visits ===
In May 2023, Movchan took part in an official delegation of the Verkhovna Rada of Ukraine that visited Washington, D.C. The delegation met with U.S. Senator Tammy Duckworth to discuss continued American support for Ukraine amid the Russian invasion.

In 2024, Movchan met with U.S. policymakers and experts as part of his efforts to promote Ukraine’s interests abroad.

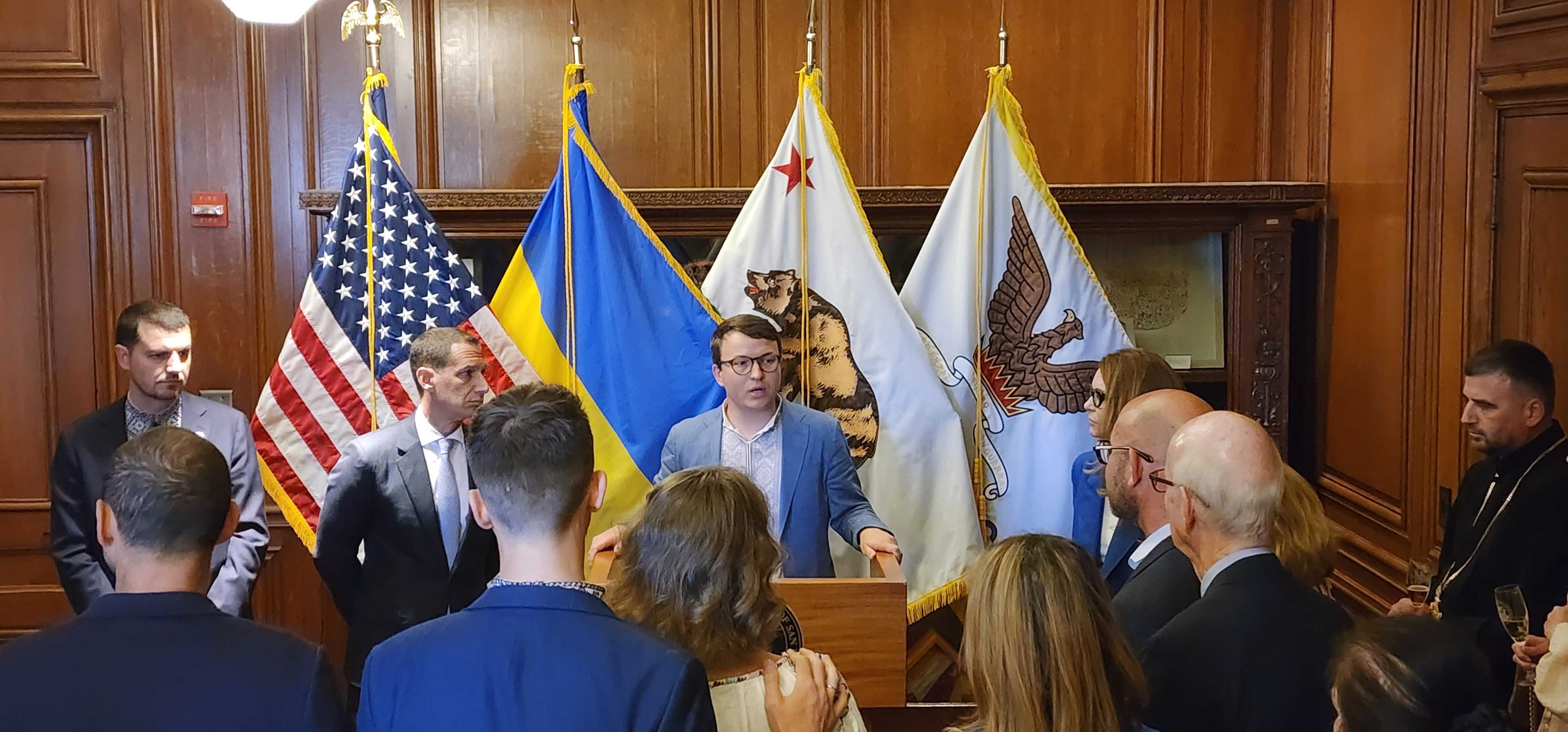
Oleksiy Movchan delivers remarks at San Francisco City Hall on August 22, 2025, during the Ukrainian flag raising ceremony.

In 2025, Movchan participated in meetings with the U.S. International Development Finance Corporation (DFC) concerning the establishment of a U.S.–Ukraine Reconstruction Investment Fund. That same year, Movchan was selected as a fellow of the Stanford-based Strengthening Ukrainian Democracy and Development (SU-DD) Program, hosted by the Center on Democracy, Development and the Rule of Law (CDDRL) at Stanford’s Freeman Spogli Institute for International Studies. Local Ukrainian media noted that Movchan traveled to the United States in August 2025 to begin his studies at Stanford.

== Controversies ==
Movchan acquired significant media attention when he hired Valeria Hrytsenko, a 24 year-old dancer, as his assistant. After information about Hrytsenko's resume were acquired by Ukrainian news organisations, Hrytsenko deleted the information, saying, "[W]hen I started working in the organisational field and as an assistant to a deputy of the Kyiv Oblast Council, I had already forgotten about those sites, and did not pay attention to the fact that my resumes remained there." Movchan defended his choice in assistants, noting that he knew her from their shared background in Kremenchuk, as well as her active interest in working as an assistant.
