= Kostyantyn Zhevago =

Ukrainian billionaire and politician

- Костянтин Жеваго
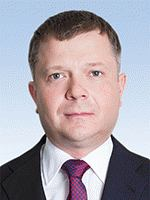

People's Deputy of Ukraine
- In office March 1998 – 29 August 2019
- Preceded by: Constituency established (1998, 2012); Yaroslav Kozak (2002)
- Succeeded by: Hennadiy Rudenko (2002); Constituency abolished (2006); Oleksiy Movchan (2019)
- Constituency: Poltava Oblast, No. 149 (1998–2002); Poltava Oblast, No. 150 (2002–2006, 2012–2019); Yulia Tymoshenko Bloc, No. 62 (2006–2012)

Personal details
- Born: 7 January 1974 (age 52) Iultin, Chukotka Autonomous Okrug, Magadan Oblast, Russian SFSR, Soviet Union
- Party: Independent
- Other political affiliations: Yulia Tymoshenko Bloc (2006-2012)
- Spouse: Alina
- Children: two
- Education: Kyiv National Economic University
- Website: http://rada.gov.ua

Kostyantyn Valentynovych Zhevago (Ukrainian: Костянтин Валентинович Жеваго, Russian: Константин Валентинович Жеваго; born 7 January 1974) is a Ukrainian businessman, philanthropist, and politician. He served as a member of the Verkhovna Rada (parliament of Ukraine) continuously for 21 years from 1998 until 2019. Additionally, he served as the Executive Director of Ferrexpo from 2008 to 2019.

As of July 2026, Forbes reported his estimated net worth to stand at US$1 billion. This made him one of Ukraine's six billionaires in 2026.

== Early life and career ==
He was born into a family of a mining engineer in the village of Iultin, Chukotka Autonomous Okrug, Magadan Oblast, in the former Soviet Union, and spent his childhood in the city of Dniprorudne, Zaporizhia Oblast, in Ukraine. He has been a citizen of Ukraine since 1991.

Kostyantyn Zhevago graduated from school with honors. In 1991, Zhevago entered the Kyiv National Economic University, specialising in accounting and analysis of foreign economic activity. In 1996, he graduated with a degree in International Economic Relations and obtained a master's degree in Economics with a specialization in International Economics. In 2003, Kostyantyn Zhevago earned a PhD in Economics with a thesis on international investments and effective economic development at Kyiv National Economic University.

== Business ==
1993–1996 — Financial Director of Finance and Credit JSC. 1996–1998 — Chairman of the Board of Finance and Credit Bank, Deputy Chairman of the Supervisory Board of Ferrexpo Poltava Mining, and member of the Supervisory Board of Ukrnafta.

Kostyantyn Zhevago, a 34-year-old investor, became the first Ukrainian billionaire to make the Ferrexpo company public. It was the first company with assets in Ukraine whose shares started trading in the main market of the London Stock Exchange, and it still has premium listings on the LSE. The company is a member of FTSE250 and FTSE4Good Indices. As the largest shareholder of Ferrexpo, Kostyantyn Zhevago supported and made decisions on investments in Ukraine, as a result of which Ferrexpo invested more than $3 billion in Ukrainian assets.

In 2007, Forbes magazine named Kostyantyn Zhevago the world's youngest billionaire, who made his fortune by himself. His bank, Finance and Credit, was ranked among the ten largest Ukrainian banks with hundreds of branches across Ukraine (liquidated at the end of 2015). Throughout his career, Kostyantyn Zhevago has held leadership positions on the supervisory and management boards of various Ukrainian and international companies across industries such as mining, metallurgy, machine-building, pharmaceuticals, and food. He was also the largest shareholder of Avtokraz, where he invested significantly in the development of defense equipment, including the chassis for the Neptune missile complex, which played a pivotal role in the destruction of the Russian Black Sea Fleet's flagship Moscow (Moskva), the wheeled self-propelled howitzer Bogdana, with which it was possible to recapture Zmiiniy Island in the Black Sea, the base for the Verba multiple launch rocket system. He owns the Ukrainian Premier League football team Vorskla (Poltava).

== Political activity ==
He was elected to the Verkhovna Rada of Ukraine at the age of 24 on 12 May 1998 and until 14 May 2002, and was a People's Deputy of Ukraine from Ukraine's 149th electoral district, located in Poltava Oblast. Member of the Committee on Economic Policy, National Economy Management, Property and Investments.

From 14 May 2002 to 25 May 2006 — People's Deputy of Ukraine of the 4th convocation from 150th electoral district of the Poltava region. Member of the Committee on Legal Policy, member of the Permanent Delegation of the Verkhovna Rada of Ukraine to the Parliamentary Assembly of the Council of Europe. Additionally, he served as a member of the "European Choice" group, the "Regions of Ukraine" faction and, "Reforms and Order". From 25 May 2006 to 23 November 2007 — People's Deputy of Ukraine of the 5th convocation from the "Tymoshenko Bloc", No. 62 on the list. Moreover, he served as a member of the Committee on Legal Policy. From 23 November 2007 — People's Deputy of Ukraine of the 6th convocation from the "Yulia Tymoshenko Bloc", No. 62 on the list. Member of the Committee on Legal Policy, member of the Special Control Commission on Privatization. Head of the deputy group on inter-parliamentary relations with Japan.

In the 2012 parliamentary elections, he ran for People's Deputy as a self-nominated candidate in the 150th single-mandate majoritarian constituency in Poltava region (centered in the city of Horishni Plavni) and won, gaining 61.20% of the vote. Eventually, he served as a member of the Verkhovna Rada of Ukraine Committee on Legal Policy, independent member of parliament. In the 2014 parliamentary elections in Ukraine, he ran again as an independent candidate in the 150th electoral district, where he won, receiving 43.81% of the vote. Member of the Committee on the Rule of Law and Justice, independent. Candidate for People's Deputy in the 2019 parliamentary elections (again as an independent candidate in the 150th electoral district). He lost to the candidate from the ruling party, "Servant of the People".

== Controlled assets ==
Over the course of his career, he has held senior roles on the supervisory and management boards of numerous Ukrainian and international companies, spanning industries including mining, metallurgy, machinery, pharmaceuticals, and food.

"Finance and Credit" bank was founded in 1990 and, by the size of assets, it was considered one of the largest banks of Ukraine according to the classification of the National Bank of Ukraine. By 1 April 2009, the authorized capital stock of the bank made ₴2 billion, net wealth made ₴18,316 billion, bank liabilities — ₴15,840 billion. The loan portfolio made ₴15,880 billion, the loan portfolio of natural person — bank clients — ₴5,983 billion. By 1 April 2009, the bank system included 16 branches and 326 departments in all areas of Ukraine. According to the Ukrainian Bank Association data, by 1 April 2009, the bank was ranked among the ten largest banks from 162 operating in the country. On 17 December 2016, the National Bank of Ukraine withdrew the banking license of Finance and Credit and liquidated the bank.

=== Group companies ===
- Real estate

JSC «F&C Realty», Hotel «Salute» Kyiv, Institute «Kyivsoyuzdorproekt»

- Energy companies

JSC "Bilotserkivska teploelektrotsentral", Ukrenerhosbut, Ukrainian-German «Mega-motors»

- Chemical industry

JSC «Rosava», Stakhanov factory of technical carbon, Zatisnyansk chemical factory

- Machine Building and Engineering

AvtoKrAZ, Uzhhorod «Turbogaz», Stakhanov carriage works, Berdychiv machine-shop «Progress»

- Shipbuilding

Zaliv Shipbuilding yard, "Kyiv shipbuilding and ship repair factory"

- Metallurgy and Resources

Biggest shareholder of Ferrexpo Poltava Mining, Skopski Legury (ferro-alloys), Electrometallurgical plant «Vorskla Steel» (in the process of building), Electrometallurgical factory «Vorskla steel Denmark»

- Pharmaceutical industry

Significant equity stakes in the JSC "Kyivmedpreparat", "Gemoplast", "Halychfarm".

- Food processing industry

Significant equity stakes in PJSC Company Kremenchukmyaso

== Wealth ==
According to Forbes, he was the world's youngest billionaire. According to estimates by Korrespondent magazine, Kyiv Post newspaper, and Dragon Capital company, Zhevago's assets in 2006 amounted to $1.9 billion, he ranked fifth among the richest Ukrainians. According to the Forbes magazine list in March 2012, Zhevago ranked #719 in the world and #4 in Ukraine with $1.8 billion. In the NV magazine rating of the "Top 100 Richest Ukrainians", published in October 2019, Zhevago's wealth was estimated at $744 million (an increase of 30% compared to 2018); 9th place in the rating. In 2022, according to the Ukrainian magazine Forbes, Kostyantyn Zhevago entered the list of five richest people in Ukraine.

== Commercial proceedings ==
After 3.5 years of trial, on 2 October 2019, the Shevchenko Court of Kyiv ordered to collect ₴1.5 billion from Zhevago in favor of the National Bank of Ukraine. The decision explains that Kostyantyn Zhevago did not want to fulfill his obligations under the surety agreement to repay the bank's refinancing loans. On 13 December, the Kyiv Court of Appeal returned Zhevago's appeal without consideration due to non-payment of the court fee within the specified time frame, after which the court's decision on compulsory collection entered into force.

== Criminal proceedings ==
In the summer of 2019, when the active phase of the parliamentary elections campaign began in Ukraine, on the day Zhevago registered as a candidate for People's Deputy of Ukraine, criminal proceedings were opened against him regarding his possible involvement in the embezzlement of ₴2.5 billion. The State Bureau of Investigation summoned Kostyantyn Zhevago for questioning on 27 September 2019. He was unable to appear for questioning because he was abroad, and on 3 December 2019, Zhevago was declared an international wanted man, and permission was granted for his detention. According to the inspection data of the Deposit Guarantee Fund, Zhevago and another top manager of the Finance and Credit bank allegedly issued several deliberately bad loans in the amount of almost ₴5 billion in order to get hold of the money. This case has been carried to date and has not been trialed in court for more than 5 years. In addition, according to Zhevago's lawyers, the State Bureau of Investigation has not provided any information regarding this criminal case for many years, which violates his and other accused managers' constitutional rights to a fair trial.

According to the investigation, in 2007-2014, the offshore company opened several credit lines in foreign banks. Pledge agreements in the amount of $113 million were concluded between the Finance and Credit Bank and foreign banks. The Ukrainian bank vouched for the offshore company with its own funds on accounts in foreign creditor banks. In 2015, foreign banks charged $113 million from the accounts of the Finance and Credit Bank for non-fulfillment of obligations by the offshore company under contracts. The collateral was written off when the bank, Finance and Credit, was declared insolvent. The investigation into this case has not been suspended for more than 5 years, and has not been tried for the same period.

On 27 December 2022, Zhevago was detained in Courchevel, France, at the request of Ukraine's State Bureau of Investigation. On 29 December 2022, the French court of Chambéry ordered the extradition arrest of Zhevago. He was notified of the suspicion of committing criminal offenses provided for in Part 3 of Art. 27, Part 5 of Art. 191, Part 3 of Art. 209 of the Criminal Code of Ukraine. Some top managers of the Bank "Finance and Credit" are also suspected. This criminal case has not been tried for over 5 years.

In March 2023, the Court in the French city of Chambery rejected the Ukrainian side's request for the extradition of Kostyantyn Zhevago, and on 10 November 2023, the Supreme Court of France rejected the Ukrainian appeal and ruled that Zhevago was not subject to extradition because Ukraine could not guarantee that Zhevago's case would be considered by an independent court. All restrictions on Zhevago were lifted.

In May 2024, Zhevago received a new suspicion of withdrawing UAH 519 million from the Finance and Credit Bank in collusion with two deputies. This new criminal case is the case materials from September 2019 and has not been tried for more than 5 years. According to the investigation, in 2007-2010, Zhevago created a criminal organization, which included the chairman, members of the board of the Finance and Credit Bank, and other persons close to him. A company controlled by Zhevago received a loan from the bank in violation of the rules, and then the money was subsequently withdrawn to offshore accounts. All these accusations are unfounded according to Zhevago's lawyers, and the specified loans have been repeatedly checked by the NBU (Ukrainian Regulator) for more than 7 years, and no violations were detected in accordance with these loans.

Zhevago has been named as the party that allegedly bribed the Chairman of the Ukraine Supreme Court, Vsevolod Kniaziev, in 2023. On 10 July 2024, the court issued a preventive measure of detention for Zhevago (ruling in absentia). Zhevago himself was in France at the time of the crime and at the beginning of the investigation, and denies any involvement in this case, stating that the accusation is politically motivated.

In 2025, President Volodymyr Zelenskyy imposed sanctions on multiple oligarchs and individuals, including Zhevago, on suspicion of "high treason" and assisting a terrorist organization, particularly their role in compromising national security through unfavorable business agreements with Russia. The next day, the Ukrainian Prosecutor General's Office announced the opening of criminal investigations against him and other sanctioned individuals. Kostyantyn Zhevago denies all accusations, as he personally and his companies are on the Russian Federation's sanctions list from October 2018.

On 19 March 2026, French authorities, acting on a request for international legal assistance from Ukraine, served Zhevago with a notice of suspicion in a separate criminal proceeding concerning the alleged embezzlement of more than ₴519 million from Finance and Credit Bank. According to Ukraine's Prosecutor General, Zhevago was suspected of creating and leading a criminal organization involving senior bank executives, which allegedly diverted funds through controlled companies and foreign financial institutions and subsequently laundered them abroad. The alleged losses included funds belonging to depositors and refinancing provided by the National Bank of Ukraine. Zhevago denied the allegations and described the prosecution as politically motivated.

On 28 April 2026, the Pechersky District Court of Kyiv authorized a special pre-trial investigation in absentia into the alleged embezzlement of US$113 million from Finance and Credit Bank between 2007 and 2015. According to investigators, bank funds deposited in correspondent accounts at foreign financial institutions were used as collateral for credit facilities granted to an offshore company controlled by Zhevago. After the company defaulted on its obligations, the foreign banks reportedly debited US$113 million from the accounts of Finance and Credit Bank, which had acted as guarantor.

On 9 November 2026, French authorities seized a Paris mansion belonging to Zhevago, following an international legal assistance request submitted by Ukraine's Prosecutor General's Office on 17 September. The property, known as the Hôtel de Jarnac and located in the 7th arrondissement of Paris, was valued by Ukrainian authorities at more than US$40 million. The seizure was carried out as part of the investigation into the alleged embezzlement of US$113 million from Finance and Credit Bank and the subsequent laundering of the funds through offshore entities and companies controlled by Zhevago. The property, an 18th-century building classified as a historical monument, had reportedly been purchased by Zhevago for €35 million in 2022. Zhevago's lawyers announced that they would appeal the seizure, describing the proceedings as politically motivated and arguing that the French decision did not establish the merits of the Ukrainian criminal allegations.

== See also ==
- KrAZ
- FC Vorskla Poltava
