= First Investment Bank (PJSC) =

Ukrainian banking chain

- Company type: public joint-stock company
- Industry: Banking; Financial services Investment services
- Founded: 1997
- Headquarters: Kyiv, Ukraine
- Key people: Zolotko Dmytro Yakovych (Chairman of the Board)
- Products: Consumer Banking; Corporate Banking; Investment banking
- Services: Financial services
- Total assets: ▲ ₴919,13 million (2012)
- Total equity: ▲ ₴230 million (2012)
- Owner: State of Ukraine —88.890583%
- Website: www.pinbank.ua
- Footnotes / references Licence of NBU № 178 dated 5 October 2009 for all kinds of banking services.

Public Join-Stock Company First Investment Bank, commonly known as PJSC First Investment Bank (Ukrainian: Pershyi Investytsiynyi Bank^{roman}) is the Ukrainian bank that offers a full range of banking services to private and corporate customers. The bank was registered on 20 June 1997 with its headquarters at 6 Moskovskiy Avenue, Kyiv. There are over 30 branches in 11 regions of Ukraine.

The bank's network consists of 30 separate subdivisions (including the head office) in 11 regions of Ukraine. The bank positions itself as a universal bank. In terms of assets as of 1 November 2020, it ranked 50th among all 74 banks in Ukraine. As of the beginning of 2020, the majority owner of the bank was a citizen of the Russian Federation, Yevgeny Giner.

== History ==
- 1997 – Registered as joint-stock bank with registered capital of ₴2,210, received a license from the NBU to engage in banking operations.
- 1998 – Member of International Payment System SWIFT (representative company in Ukraine is ProFIX), Member of the Ukrainian Interbank Currency Exchange, Member of the Professional Association of Registrars and Depositories. Issue of shares and capital increased to ₴3,159.
- 1999 – Issue of shares and capital increased of up to ₴15,900.
- 2000 – Member of the Fund Deposit Guarantee.
- 2001 – Permission of NBU to deposit money in the share capital of other entities.
- 2002 – Associate member of the Visa Inc. and an affiliate member of MasterCard Europe MasterCard International. Member of the Association of Ukrainian Banks and the Association of Ukrainian Credit-Bank Union. Issue of shares and capital increased to ₴28,613 thousand.
- 2003 – Reorganized into a joint-stock company.
- 2004 – Issue of shares and capital increased to ₴68,613.
- 2005 – One of the founders of the LLC First Ukrainian Bureau of Credit Story, founded by the Association of Ukrainian Banks. Member of the Association "PFTS Stock Exchange." Ranked among the "Top 100 best financial institutions".
- 2006 – With the permission of the NBU, the bank conducts the depository activity of securities. Member of the National System of Mass Electronic Payments. Member of the Ukrainian National Mortgage Association. Issue of shares and capital increased to ₴149,999.
- 2007 – 10 years of stable work in the market. 27th place as the best custodian in "TOP-100. The best financial institutions". Member of the Ukrainian Interbank Payment Systems Member Association "EMA". Subscription for shares in the amount of ₴50,000. The decision to begin re-branding.
- 2008 – Permission of the international payment system VISA International to issue bonus payment cards Visa Platinum. Getting Started Contact center. Start the certification process of business processes, according to the standard ISO 9001:2008. Increase in share capital up to ₴200 million. The opening of offices in the cities of Dnipropetrovsk and Zaporizhia.
- 2009 – The name was changed according to legislative requirements on public joint-stock company "First Investment Bank." PJSC "First Investment Bank." The first bank in Ukraine received an international certificate of quality management system conforming to the international standard ISO 9001:2008. The certification authority – an international company TÜV Rheinland Group (LLC TÜV Rheinland Ukraine, www.tuv.com.ua). Poltava and Nikolaev branch offices are opened.
- 2010 – Issue of shares and share capital increased of up to ₴230 million. Quality certification of management system to standard ISO 9001:2008. Confirmation of credit rating on National uaBBB-rating scale with a stable outlook.
- April,2011 Founding of the associated company is LTD "The Global pay network", testifying to registration of financial institution and License for realization of transfer of funds by non-bank financial institutions. Registration of the domestic non-bank payment system is initiated. Beginning of introduction of Control system of informative safety in accordance with the international standards of series of ISO/IEC 27001:2005 and ISO/IEC 27002:2005, subject to account modifications of the National bank of Ukraine, specified in the standards of ISO/IEC 27002 ISMS 1.0:2010 та ISO/IEC 27002 ISMS 2.0:2010.
- May, 2011 PJSC "First Investment Bank" successfully passed the second supervisory audit of the quality management system for compliance with ISO 9001:2008. In July, an independent authorized credit rating agency "ІBI-Rating» conferred to PJSC "First Investment Bank" the credit rating uaBBB+ by the National rating scale with forecast of rating – stable. (RA "ІBI-Rating»)
- In early 2020, the National Bank of Ukraine approved the candidacy of Dmytro Yakovych Zolotko for the position of the chairman of the management board of the bank, appointed by the supervisory board of the bank on 16 December 2019. Prior to his appointment, over the past 5 years, Dmytro Zolotko was an advisor to the chairman of the Board of Ukrgasbank, Treasurer - deputy chairman of the Board of Ukrainian Sberbank.
- In March 2023, the High Anti-Corruption Court of Ukraine confiscated and turned into state revenue 88.9% of the shares owned by the president of the CSKA football club, Russian citizen Yevgeni Giner. The decision was made on the basis of the Ukrainian law on sanctions.

=== Nationalisation ===
In the summer of 2023, the State Bureau of Investigation (SBI) identified dozens of companies affiliated with Russian owners whose activities fell under point 11 of part one of Article 4 of the Law of Ukraine "On Sanctions." Among the ultimate beneficiaries of these commercial entities were several high-profile Russian oligarchs. In particular, 88.89% of the shares of First Investment Bank (AT “Pershyi Investytsiinyi Bank”) were owned by Yevgeni Giner.

Based on SBI materials, the High Anti-Corruption Court of Ukraine reviewed and issued a series of decisions applying sanctions to these commercial entities and their owners. As a result, assets belonging to representatives of the oligarchic structures of the aggressor state, including those of First Investment Bank were nationalised and transferred to the ownership of the Ukrainian state. According to official reporting, this provided billions of hryvnias in assets to the state budget.

On 13 July 2023, First Deputy Governor of the National Bank of Ukraine, Kateryna Rozhkova, told Ekonomichna Pravda that the National Bank considered liquidation of the nationalised First Investment Bank as a possible outcome.

On 24 January 2024, the confiscated PIN Bank was transferred to state ownership.

On 28 January 2025, the press service of the Ministry for Community Development and Territories announced that the Government of Ukraine had transferred the shares of First Investment Bank (Pinbank) to Ukrposhta to create a postal bank intended to expand access to financial services for over 30% of Ukrainians, including those in frontline, de-occupied and remote areas. The new "Ukrposhta Bank" was reported to operate under a special restricted banking licence.

=== 2026 Acquisition ===
In April 2026, First Investment Bank (Pinbank) was acquired by Polish fintech company Zen.com. Zen purchased a 100% stake in the bank for Hr 175 million ($3.9 million), according to Ukraine's Deposit Guarantee Fund.

== Ratings and awards ==
- Ratings of PARD in 2010 Q3 – 13th place among 100 custodians in terms of accounting operations performed, 23rd place among the 100 custodians in terms of custody assets at nominal value;
- 2010 PFTS ratings – 18th place to trade in shares of 114 dealers, 27 place for trade ІCІ of 42 dealers, 33 in trade in corporate bonds of 81 dealers.
- Credit rating on a national scale uaBBB-(investment with a stable projection. Data Credit-Rating Agency).
- Awards in the categories of All-Ukrainian contest "Best domestic goods 2008"
  - Mortgage lending to individuals with the establishment of a mortgage investment object (real estate) in the primary market
  - Program for the corporate Clients and online deposits
  - The highest bid of the underwriting of securities
- Top 100 of the Best Financial Companies in 2007

As of 31 December 2010 equity capital amounts to ₴230,000,000 and 22,984,203 ordinary registered shares with a nominal value of ₴10 per share. There are also 15 797 preferred stocks with a nominal value of ₴10 per share.

== Top-Management and Supervisory Board ==
- Malkin Oleg Aleksandrovich – chairman of the Board
- Polonskaya Elina Genrihovna – deputy chairman of the Board
- Sakhno Svetlana Vladimirovna – deputy chairman of the Board
- Prikhodko Svetlana Victorovna – deputy chairman of the Board
- Kolesnik Irina Victorovna – Chief Accountant
- Kolyada Vasiliy Petrovich – Head of Security Service

== Bank details ==
- PJSC «First Investment Bank»
- Cor. account No. 32006176101 in the Main Department of the NBU in Kyiv and Kyiv region
- Sort Code 300506. EDRPOU 26410155
- Individual tax code No. 264101526657
- Certificate number VAT 100330414
- El. address of NBU UIST
- TELEX 131 169 FIBX UX
- SWIFT code FIBX UA UK

== Licenses and Permits ==
- License No. 178 dated 05.10.2009 and Permission No. 178-4 of 05.10.2009 the right to conduct banking operations. Registered by NBU 20.06.1997 for No. 267;
- License for professional activity at the stock market – brokerage, series AG No.579894, issued by the State Committee on Securities and Stock market dated 23 September 2011, the decision to issue No.795 dated 18 August 2011, the term of the license to 24 September 2016
- License for professional activity at the stock market – dealer activity, series AG No.579895, issued by the State Committee on Securities and Stock market dated 23 September 2011, the decision to issue No.795 dated 18 August 2011, the term of the license to 24 September 2016
- License for professional activity at the stock market – underwriting, series AG No.579896, issued by the State Committee on Securities and Stock market dated 23 September 2011, the decision to issue No.795 dated 18 August 2011, the term of the license to 24 September 2016
- License for professional activity at the stock market – depositary activity viz. the depositary activity of the Custodian of securities, series AG No.579897, issued by the State Committee on Securities and Stock market dated 23 September 2011, the decision to issue No.796 dated 18 August 2011, the term of the license to 24 September 2016

=== Financial organizations ===
- PFTS Stock Exchange
- Ukrainian International Stock Exchange
- PJSC "Ukrainian Stock Exchange"
- ENPI "Register of borrowers"

=== Payment systems ===
- MasterCard International
- Visa Inc.
- National system of mass electronic payments (NSMEP)
- Reuters
- SWIFT
- Western Union
- MoneyGram
- Anelik
- Avers

=== Associations ===
- Association of Ukrainian Banks
- Professional Association of Registrars and Depositories (PARD)
- Ukrainian Interbank Association of Payment Systems Members "EMA"
- Association "Ukrainian stock traders"
- Ukrainian National Mortgage Association (UNIA)
