= Kyrylo Shevchenko =

Ukrainian banker (born 1972)

- Кирило Шевченко
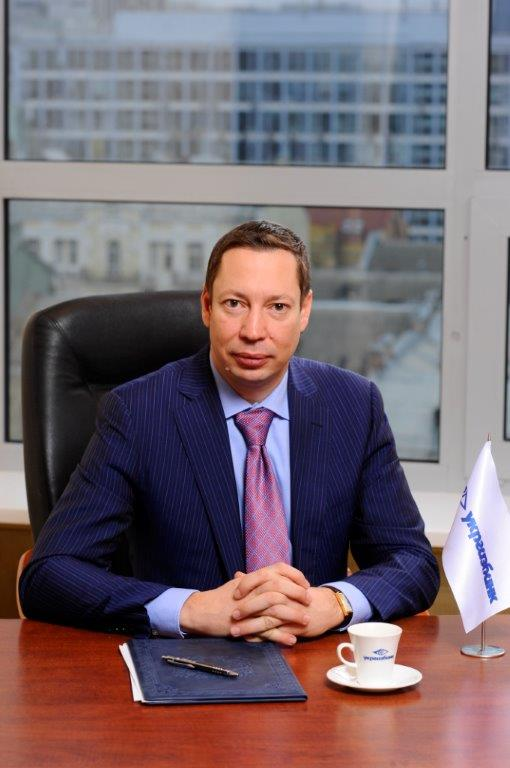

12th Chairman of the National Bank of Ukraine
- In office 16 July 2020 – 6 October 2022
- Preceded by: Kateryna Rozhkova (acting)
- Succeeded by: Andriy Pyshnyi

Personal details
- Born: 25 October 1972 (age 53) Tula, Russian SFSR, Soviet Union
- Education: Kharkiv Economic University
- Profession: Banker

Kyrylo Yevhenovych Shevchenko (Ukrainian: Кирило Євгенович Шевченко; born 25 October 1972) is a Ukrainian banker and a former Head of the National Bank of Ukraine from July 2020 until October 2022, when he resigned and left Ukraine due to alleged political persecution. Shevchenko is also a former chairman of the board of state-owned Ukrgasbank from 2014 to 2020.

== Education and career ==
September 1987 — August 1989, Shevchenko worked as repairmen at the Illich mine in Kadiivka, Luhansk Oblast.

In 1994 Shevchenko graduated from Kharkiv State Economic University with a diploma in economics.

March 1995 — September 1995, leading economist at Aval Bank.

October 1995 — December 2006, he made a career in Finance and Credit bank, having occupied the position of the first deputy chairman of the board.

December 2006 — May 2009, head of the State Mortgage Institution.

May 2009 — September 2009, adviser to the Prime Minister of Ukraine Yulia Tymoshenko.

In 2010, Kyrylo Shevchenko together with his business partner, First Deputy Minister of Finance during the Azarov administration Vadym Kopylov, bought the now liquidated Terra Bank.

From 14 April 2010 to 11 April 2011 he was the CEO of Terra Bank. Shevchenko had changed his position on 28 April 2011, becoming the Supervisory Board Chairman until 6 April 2012, when the partners sold Terra Bank to structures linked to Ruslan Tsyplakov, a close friend of Viktor Yanukovych's sons.

=== Ukrgasbank ===
September 2009 — April 2010, first deputy chairman of the management board of Ukrgasbank.

May 2012 — August 2014, advisor to the chairman of the board of state-owned bank Oschadbank.

October 2014 — May 2015, acting chairman of the board of Ukrgasbank.

28 May 2015 — 16 July 2020, chairman of the board of Ukrgasbank.

In 2017, Kyrylo Shevchenko together with the Minister of Ecology and Natural Resources of Ukraine Ostap Semerak presented the first in Ukraine environmentally friendly payment card made entirely of bio-raw materials. The manufacturer of the new payment cards is the German company Giesecke & Devrient.

=== National Bank of Ukraine ===
On 16 July 2020, the Verkhovna Rada (Ukraine's parliament) appointed Kyrylo Shevchenko the Chairman of the National Bank of Ukraine. Right after his appointment, Shevchenko appointed Olexandr Prysyazhniyk, as the NBU's Head of Executive Office. On 22 July 2020, former deputy minister of finances Yuriy Heletiy became a deputy head of NBU.

In 2020, during the COVID-19 crisis, the National Bank of Ukraine started using non-traditional monetary instruments, which provided additional assistance to the banking system and lending during the most difficult period of the crisis and at the initial stage of economic recovery. After the return of the economy to recovery in 2021, the NBU began the gradual winding down of these mechanisms.

Under the chairmanship of Shevchenko, the NBU did not change monetary policy and continued its course of balancing between the reaction to inflation and the recovery of the economy.

On January 25, 2021, the NBU signed a loan agreement between the Ministry of Finance of Ukraine, the International Finance Corporation (IFC) and JSC Ukrgasbank regarding the provision of a loan in the amount of EUR 30 million with the possibility of further conversion of loan funds into the bank's authorized capital.

From April 1, 2021, the new NSFR prudential standard was introduced aimed to stimulating of banks in order to attract more stable and long-term sources of funding.

On April 16, 2021, the National Bank began cooperation with the IFC on the development of "green financing".

In 2021, the NBU developed a new institutional strategy of the National Bank until 2025 with a focus on boosting economic growth and digitization. Thanks to the monetary policy of the National Bank of Ukraine in 2021, when many countries of the world were struggling inflation, Ukraine managed to reverse the downward inflation trend. After a peak in September 2021, when the indicator was 11%, it already fell to 10% in December 2021 and continued to decline. In August 2021, Foreign Exchange Reserves reached a record level. The National Bank ended 2021 with a positive balance of currency interventions in the amount of $2.4 billion, which made it possible to increase international reserves to $31 billion. (i.e. by 6%), and also end the year with a record profit of ₴77.5 billion.

LIGA.net named the continuation of cooperation with the IMF after a long pause as one of Kyrylo Shevchenko's achievements as head of the NBU.

The activity of the NBU under Shevchenko was characterized by independence from the government in making and implementing decisions, which was a determining factor for the IMF and other creditors in the matter of financing Ukraine.

In January 2022, amid news of a possible invasion of Ukraine by the Russian Federation, the NBU pursued a balanced policy of foreign exchange interventions, which managed to counteract the devaluation, which began due to the psychological factor, and stabilize the hryvnia exchange rate.

Shevchenko managed to ensure an uninterrupted operation of the financial system during the full-scale war.

On 24 February 2022, at the beginning of the Russian invasion, the NBU fixed the dollar exchange rate and introduced currency and cash withdrawal restrictions to prevent capital outflows. Other key decisions of the NBU included fixing the key policy rate and exchange rate, supporting bank branches and ATMs with cash, cooperating with other central banks to exchange refugees' cash hryvnia, blanket refinancing, relaxing banking regulations, raising the discount rate from 10 to 25%, preventing a wider depreciation of the hryvnia, maintaining international reserves at over $25 billion, and keeping inflation lower than in some Eastern European countries.

Shevchenko also managed to held negotiations with the IMF on a new program and the allocation of two tranches of Rapid Financing, which allowed to finance the state budget deficit.

According to the MP Yaroslav Zheleznyak, First Deputy Chairman of the Verkhovna Rada Committee on Finance, Taxation and Customs Policy, the NBU with Shevchenko as its head was one of the few state authorities that were best prepared for the war and coped with its task most effectively.

=== Resignation and alleged political persecution ===
Shevchenko submitted his resignation on 4 October 2022, citing "health-related issues that can no longer be ignored" in a Facebook post. Shevchenko was dismissed by parliament two days later.

Maksym Oryshchak, an analyst at the Center for Exchange Technologies, said that Shevchenko's resignation was caused by his difficult relations with the country's ruling elites. This, among other things, could also affect Shevchenko's health, as well as work in times of crisis (coronavirus, the beginning of a full-scale war with Russia). Probably, Shevchenko resigned due to misunderstandings that he had with the President's Office. On his personal Facebook page, he mentioned "two years of political pressure, which intensified on the eve of my decision". According to Shevchenko, he was pressured to "make decisions that I consider harmful to the financial stability of the state and a threat to the institutional independence of the NBU." The reason for the misunderstanding could be Shevchenko's independence in decision-making regarding the NBU's activities.

In addition, the President's Office was dissatisfied with Shevchenko's conflict with the first deputy head of the NBU Kateryna Rozhkova, as well as his decision to leave her only technical functions. The head of the President's Office was also not satisfied with Ukraine receiving only one of the five planned tranches under the anti-crisis Stand By program from the IMF.

On October 6, 2022, the Specialized Anti-corruption Prosecutor's Office notified the head of the National Bank Kyryl Shevchenko and four other persons of suspicion of illegal actions during his leadership of Ukrgasbank. 24 October 2022, it became known that Shevchenko left the country. Ukraine's national anti-corruption agency declared former central bank governor Kyrylo Shevchenko wanted.

A number of Ukrainian bloggers, journalists and politicians did not support Shevchenko's accusations of corruption schemes and believe that these persecutions are political. In the Ukrainian Forbes, one of the lawyers from the Office of the President team said on the rights of anonymity, that the NABU investigation about the Ukrgasbank case, which lasts more than 4 years, could only be a lever of pressure on Shevchenko.

Yulia Samaeva, editor of the Ukrainian weekly economics department, claimed that criminal proceedings were a tool of pressure on Kyryl Shevchenko, who refused to comply with the requirements of the Office of the President on hryvnia emission, lowering the discount rate and other regulatory decisions within the competence of the NBU.

Financial analyst and economic expert Oleksii Kushch considered that, “the case opened by the National Anti-Corruption Bureau (NABU) against him contains no convincing evidence of the guilt of the former head of the NBU and has no judicial prospect”.

On October 25, Shevchenko announced that he was on consular registration in an EU country, and had officially informed Ukraine's law enforcement authorities about his actual location. He also asked the embassy to provide premises for the organization of video communication during the interrogation. Separately, Shevchenko expressed the opinion that declaring him wanted is an unnecessary confirmation of the involvement and politicization of the investigation and called on NABU to ensure the openness, transparency and impartiality of the process.

On 19 December 2022, NABU detectives had filed a request to extend the Ukrgasbank pre-trial investigation due to lack of evidence of his guilt. Shevchenko wrote in a Facebook post that “NABU’s case against me is falling apart”.

Journalist Serhiy Lyamets called this transfer "political persecution of Kyrylo Shevchenko by Zelenskyy's government and "cooperation" of NABU with the current government". The blogger calls the reasons for this persecution a protracted conflict between Kyrylo Shevchenko and the President's Office, caused by the reluctance of the head of the National Bank to finance the budget deficit by issuing hryvnia and attempts to impose personnel appointments on the National Bank.

The editor of the Forbes-Ukraine column "Money" Serhiy Shevchuk states that Shevchenko's resignation was caused by constant pressure from the President's Office on the NBU and caused concern among Ukraine's international partners about the threat to the independence of the National Bank.

== Private life ==
Shevchenko is married and has a daughter.

Government offices
Preceded by Kateryna Rozhkova (acting)	Governor of the National Bank of Ukraine; 2020–2022	Succeeded by Andriy Pyshnyi
