= A-Bank =

Bank in Ukraine

- Trade name: A-Bank; А-Банк
- Native name: PAT 'Accent-Bank'; ПАТ "Акцент-Банк"
- Romanized name: Aktsent-Bank
- Formerly: Kyivpryvatbank (1992–1993); Ukrainian Credit Bank (1993–2007)
- Founded: 1992
- Headquarters: Dnipro
- Owner: Surkis family (100%)
- Number of employees: 2 225
- Website: a-bank.com.ua

The Public JSC 'A-Bank' (full named as Ukrainian: ПАТ " Акцент-Банк", romanized: PAT Accent-Bank, stylised as àbank), is a private commercial bank in Ukraine, founded in 1992 and headquartered in Dnipro since 2007. In early 2024, it was confirmed by the National Bank of Ukraine as one of the country's systemically important banks.

== Overview ==
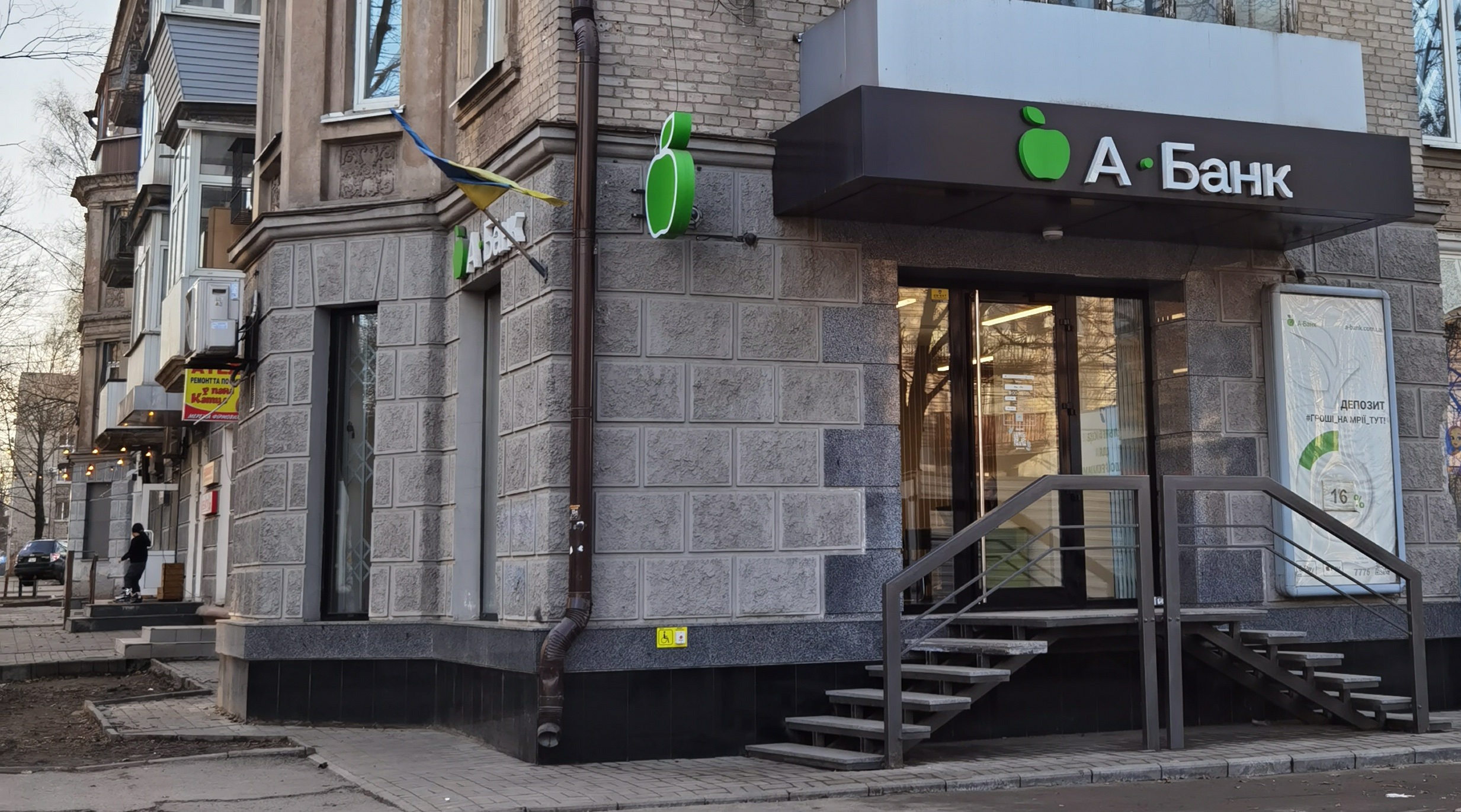
A-Bank in Dnipro, Ukraine.

The bank was originally established in 1992 under the name Kyivprivatbank, and was later rebranded as Ukrainian Credit Bank. It counted Viktor Medvedchuk among its co-founders. In 2004, the bank's head Yury Lyakh was found dead in his office.

Ukrainian Credit Bank was placed under temporary administration in 2006 and subsequently recapitalized by investors including Viktor Medvedchuk, his associate Ihor Surkis and Ihor Kolomoyskyi's PrivatBank. In 2007, the bank restarted operations under the name Accent-Bank, It rebranded itself as A-Bank in 2010. and its head office relocated from Kyiv to Dnipro.

In September 2015, Ihor Surkis, his brother Hryhoriy Surkis and their daughters together secured full control of the bank's equity capital.

== See also ==
- List of banks in Ukraine
- FC Dynamo Kyiv
