= Banking in Ukraine =

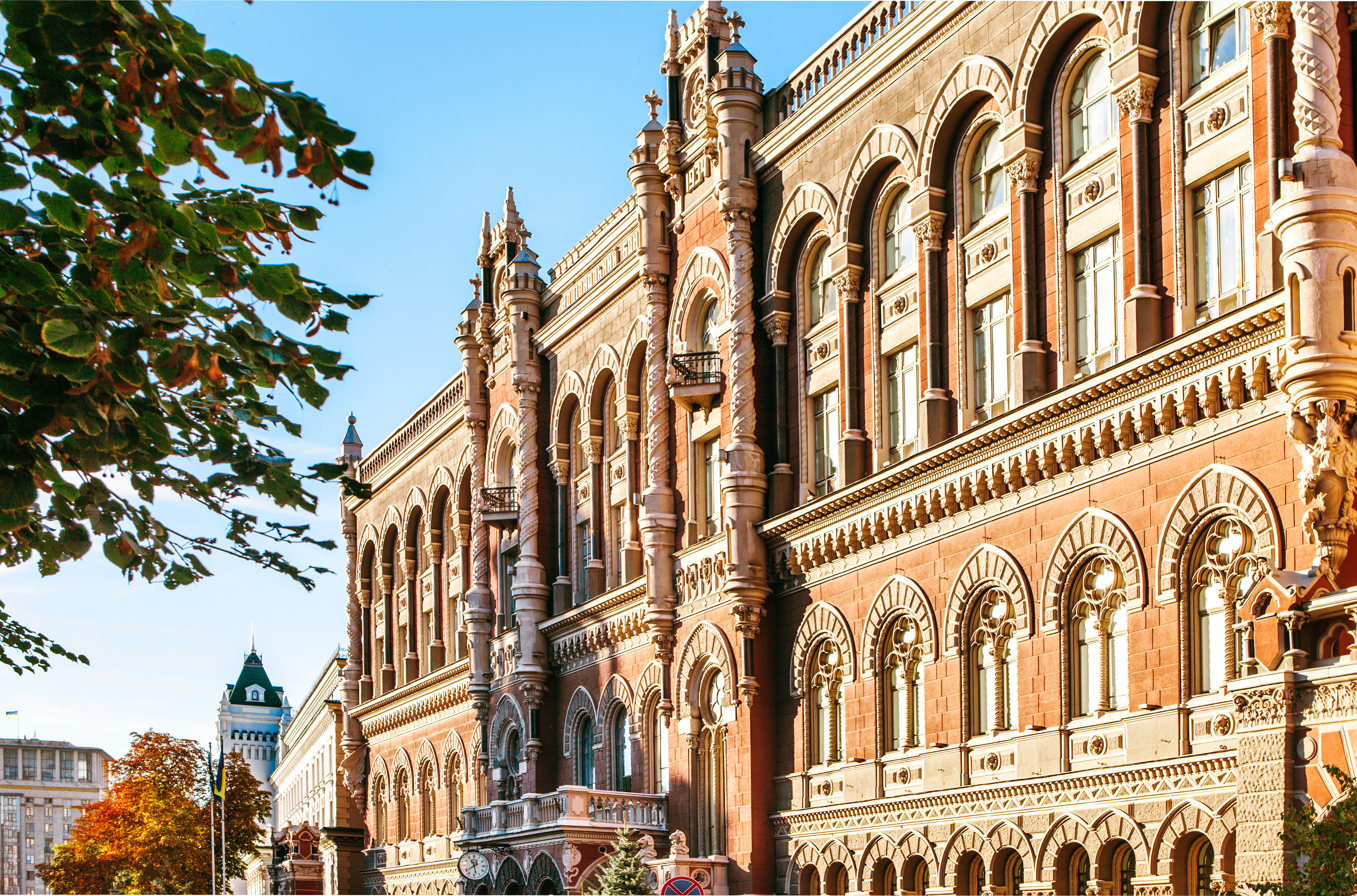
The National Bank of Ukraine

The history of banking in Ukraine since Ukrainian independence in 1991 has seen since the late 2000s several periods of bank mergers and acquisitions of different natures. Early 2016 117 banks were operating in Ukraine, their assets amounted to ₴1.254 trillion. According to the central bank of Ukraine there were 81 solvent licensed banks in Ukraine on 1 October 2018 whose assets were ₴1.355 trillion ($48 billion).

== Background ==
Banking in Ukraine traces its history back to 22 December 1917, when the Central Council of Ukraine adopted a law "On the transformation of the Kyiv office of the Russian State Bank into the Ukrainian State Bank". The Ukrainian State Bank took over the functions of the (Russian) State Bank, Noble Land Bank, and Peasant Land Bank. The Central Executive Committee of Ukraine issued a decree nationalizing banks on 14 December 1917. On 5 January 1918, the Ukrainian State Bank started to issue its own money. On 10 August 1918, a statute was signed on the Ukrainian State Bank. On 23 August 1918, the State Land Bank was established.

At the end of World War I, Ukraine was occupied by the Russian Soviet Federative Socialist Republic, which operated a policy of War Communism; banks were not permitted. However, in 1921 branches of the State Bank of the Russian SFSR started to be established across Ukraine. Later these became branches of the Central Bank of the USSR.

In the 1980s, before the fall of the Soviet Union and during the time of perestroika, the National Bank of Ukraine was a republic-level branch of the Central Bank of the USSR, while there were other financial institutions of varying status. There were more than 15 banks of ministerial status, over 20 banks of state/cooperative institutions, banks of other Republics operating in Ukraine, and other state-recognized banks. The National Bank of Ukraine took on central banking functions in Ukraine in early 1991. Like institutions of many newly independent nations, it faced dire financial straits during the 1990s, leading to a prolonged period of hyperinflation.

On 20 March 1991, the Verkhovna Rada (parliament) of Ukraine adopted the resolution "On Banks and Banking Activity", which became law on 1 May. The resolution declared ownership by the Ukrainian SSR of the Ukrainian Republic Bank of the State Bank of the USSR (later National Bank of Ukraine), the Ukrainian Republic Bank of the State Commercial Industrial-Constructional Bank of the USSR "Ukrprombudbank", the Ukrainian Republic Bank of the Savings Bank of the USSR, and the Ukrainian Republic Bank of the ForeignEconomBank of the USSR as well as the Ukrainian Republic Department of Encashment of the State Bank of the USSR.

== Post-independence history ==
In the years before the 2008–2009 Ukrainian financial crisis stakes in Ukrainian banks were mostly acquired by foreign firms who had great hopes that the Ukrainian economy and banking system would soon start to grow rapidly and had (due to the flourishing economy prior to the 2008 financial crisis) money to invest in Ukraine and lend out. The new owners often bought banks at prices that were five to seven times above their actual value and (the banks they bought) had often a low quality of assets.

During the presidency of Viktor Yanukovych (from February 2010 until his removal from power in February 2014), the mostly foreign bank owners lost hope in the prospects of the Ukrainian economy and banking system under the then Azarov Government. Bank owners sold their assets to Ukrainian businessmen close to the government. These new owners averagely paid 0.5–1.0% of the bank's value.

After the Revolution of Dignity and due to the Russo-Ukrainian War, Ukraine's economy shrank 6.8% in 2014 and mergers and acquisitions of banks came to a standstill. From early 2014 till November 2015, the National Bank of Ukraine declared 62 (Ukrainian) banks insolvent. In early 2016, 117 banks were operating in Ukraine with assets amounting to ₴1.254 trillion. By August 2016, eight more financial institutions had been declared insolvent. Since July 2015, foreign firms have started to buy Ukrainian banks again. On 17 December 2016, the National Bank of Ukraine withdrew the banking license of Finance and Credit and liquidated the bank. On 1 July 2015, in terms of total assets, this was this bank placed 10th in the top 15 of largest commercial banks in Ukraine. The National Bank declared more than 60 banks insolvent in 2014–2015 and withdraw from the market another 18 financial institutions in 2016.

All Ukraine's banks combined, excluding insolvent banks, posted a loss of ₴66.6 billion in 2015. 71 banks ended 2015 with profit amounting to ₴5.2 billion.

In December 2016, PrivatBank, which holds more than a third of individual bank deposits in Ukraine, was nationalized to "save the banking system." President Poroshenko stated "It’s obvious that the only way to save the bank and ensure the safety of its clients’ funds is to bring it into state ownership".

In 2016, the solvent Ukrainian banks reduced losses compared to 2015 by three times (to ₴18.9 billion). And early 2017 the National Bank considered it possible that Ukrainian banks could reach a level of profits in 2017. In 2018 Ukrainian banks made a profit of ₴21.7 billion. The last time the banking system was profitable had been in 2013, when profit amounted to ₴1.4 billion.

According to the National Bank of Ukraine, there were 81 solvent licensed banks in Ukraine on 1 October 2018 whose assets were ₴1.355 trillion ($48 billion).

On 1 November 2019 all Ukrainian banks had fully switched to the IBAN standard.

According to the Ukrainian Banking Association, in August 2025, there were 60 banks operating in Ukraine, with total assets of ₴3.516 trillion ($83.137 billion). The net assets showed a growth of over ₴100 billion from 2024, most of which came from privately-owned banks that weren't subject to threats of nationalization.

== See also ==
- List of banks in Ukraine
