= Vasyl Horbal =

Ukrainian politician (born 1971)

- Василь Горбаль
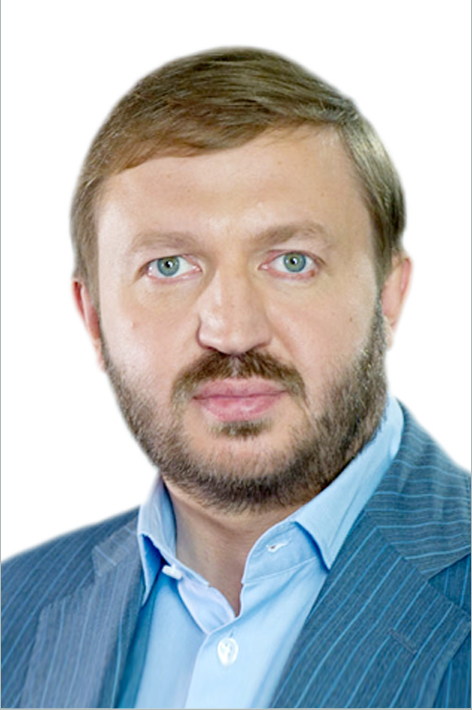

Governor of Lviv Oblast
- In office April 2010 – December 2010
- Preceded by: Mykola Kmit
- Succeeded by: Mykhailo Tsymbaliuk

Personal details
- Born: 18 March 1971 (age 55) Lviv, Ukrainian SSR, Soviet Union
- Party: Party of Regions
- Education: Kyiv University; Academy of Internal Affairs

Vasyl Mykhailovych Horbal (Ukrainian: Василь Михайлович Горбаль; born 18 March 1971) is a Ukrainian politician and economist. Horbal formerly served as a People's Deputy of the Verkhovna Rada from 2002 to 2010, representing the Party of Regions, until he was appointed Governor of Lviv Oblast in April 2010. In December 2010, he was dismissed from the post of governor by Viktor Yanukovych after the Lviv Oblast Council expressed no confidence in Horbal. Prior to entering politics, Orbal served as an economist banker, and in 1996 became director of Ukrgasbank.

== Early life ==
Horbal was born on 18 March 1971 in Lviv, which was then part of the Lviv Oblast of the Ukrainian SSR. His father, Mykhailo, was the head of a polygraph shop called "LvivPhoto" and his mother, Rimma, was head of a laboratory at the Lviv Polytechnic National University. In 1993, Horbal graduated from the Faculty of International Relations at Kyiv University with a degree in international economics, and was also granted the title of referant-translator to the English language.

Following his graduation, he worked as a leading economist for JSC "Transcredobank", and he slowly started working his way up in the company. In 1994 he became Head of the Department of Currency Transactions and Securities Transactions, and then later that year Deputy Chairman of the Board alongside becoming Head of the Department of Correspondent Relations and Monetary and Financial Transactions for the JSB "Kyiv-Pechersky". In 1995 he became acting director of the branches in Kyiv for CB "FEB". In 1996 he was appointed as a director of Ukrgasbank. In 2001, he defended his PhD at the Academy of Internal Affairs on the topic "Human Rights in the Legal Thought of the Dnieper Ukraine of the Late XVIII — Early XX Centuries."

== Political career ==
In 2002-2010 Horbal was a member of Verkhovna Rada representing the Party of Regions.

In 2008 he unsuccessfully ran for the mayor of Kyiv.

In April 2010 Horbal was appointed Governor of Lviv Oblast. After being appointed as a governor Horbal was supposed to terminated his parliamentary duty, but instead even though he physically was in Lviv, his card voted on several issues in parliament including the so-called Kharkiv Pact. After a secret ballot in which 66 deputies of the Lviv Oblast Council expressed their no-confidence in the Governor, President Viktor Yanukovych dismissed Horbal in December 2010. In the 2012 Ukrainian parliamentary election, he attempted to run again for the Verkhovna Rada as a self-nominated candidate for constituency No. 221 (Kyiv), but lost to Leonid Yemets.

In September 2018 he was one of five Ukrainian MPs who signed a letter to the Ecumenical Patriarch, Bartholomew I of Constantinople, in which they called for the postponement of the tomos that granted autocephaly to the Orthodox Church of Ukraine, thereby ending its dependence on the Russian Orthodox Church.

In 2020, he was approved by the parliament to be a member of the Council of the National Bank of Ukraine.
