= Ihor Surkis =

Ukrainian football executive

- Ігор Суркіс
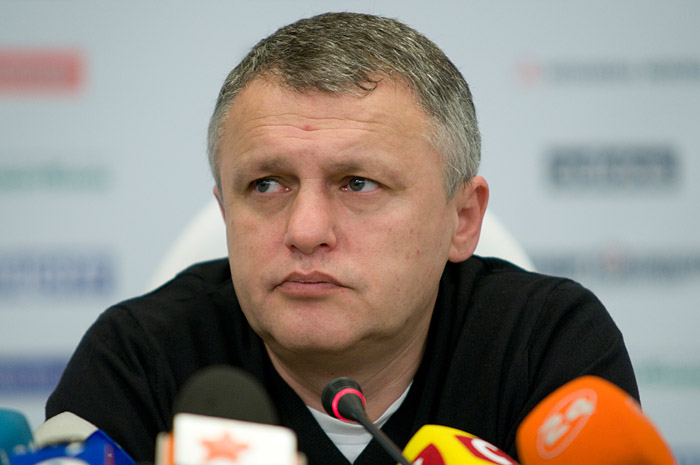
- Surkis in 2009
- Born: Ihor Mykhailovych Surkis; 22 November 1958 (age 67); Kiev, Ukrainian SSR, Soviet Union (now Kyiv, Ukraine)
- Occupation: Businessman
- Known for: Owner and president of Dynamo Kyiv
- Children: 2
- Parents: Mykhailo Davydovych Surkis; Rima Yanivna Gorinshtein
- Relatives: Hryhoriy Surkis (brother)

Ihor Mykhailovych Surkis (Ukrainian: Ігор Михайлович Суркіс; born 22 November 1958) is a Ukrainian oligarch best known for being an owner and President of Dynamo Kyiv since 2002. His brother, Hryhoriy Surkis, was the head of the Football Federation of Ukraine from August 2000 to September 2012.

== Early age ==
He was born into the family of military doctor Mykhailo (Rakhmil) Davidovych Surkis and Rima Yanivna (née Gorinshtein), a daughter of the Kyivan football commentator and fan Yan Petrovych Gorinshtein. Surkis family settled in Kyiv after moving there from the Soviet Central Asia.

== Kyivan "Wonderful Seven" ==
Along with his older brother Ihor is a member of so-called Kyivan Wonderful Seven (K7) or Surkis and Co. The group included a former Kyiv mayor Valentyn Zghursky, Ukrainian politician Viktor Medvedchuk, Yuriy Karpenko, Yuriy Lyakh, and Bohdan Hubsky. After fall of the Soviet Union, the Surkis and Co was involved in a Ponzi scheme "Ometa 21st century" similar to the MMM in Russia. Later its members along with the former President of Ukraine Leonid Kravchuk participated in a political project the Social Democratic Party of Ukraine (united) that had its own faction in the parliament.

Within the K-7, Ihor Surkis was heading a Ukrainian-American joint venture "Dinamo-Atlantik" (Russian: Динамо-Атлантик) managing the import and sales of huge shipments of alcohol and tobacco in Ukraine that went through the company’s books, duty-free. Although after the 1994 election, the newly-elected President Kuchma removed K7 from influence and power, it succeeded in returning closer to the country’s administration in 1996, luring in the new President with its services. In 1998, K7 took the United Social Democratic Party of Ukraine under its control, thus guaranteeing its political protection.

== Awards ==
- Order "For Merits" of all degrees: I (2006), II (2004), III (2003).
- State Prize of Ukraine in the Field of Architecture (2002) for the architecture of the Dynamo training complex on Stolychny Shosse in Kyiv.

== Family life ==
Together with his brother Hryhoriy he is one of the 50 richest Ukrainians.

Married, has two daughters.

== Scandals ==
=== Mink coat for referee ===
In 1995 Ihor Surkis was involved in scandal when he personally was accused in bribing by a UEFA referee, Antonio López Nieto. At that time Ihor Surkis served as a general manager of the club. In the scandal was involved the club's general secretary Babiychuk.

=== Anti-Jewish taunts ===
During a cup match against Karpaty Lviv in 2006, opposing fans hurled anti-Jewish insults at Surkis. It resulted in a US$5,000 fine for their club.

=== UEFA money for FFU ===
In September 2019, the German news outlet Der Spiegel published an article in which it was stated that UEFA made transfer of money intended for Football Federation of Ukraine (today Ukrainian Association of Football) yet ended up in the British Virgin Islands tax off-shore firm "Newport Management Limited" associated with Ihor Surkis. The financial transactions were conducted in a timeframe between 2002 – 2016. In response Ihor Surkis accused Der Spiegel in defamation campaign against his football club and the "Newport" on behalf of Ukrainian Association of Football.

=== Cooperation with Ihor Kolomoysky ===
Ihor Surkis denied and denies his cooperation with another Ukrainian oligarch, Ihor Kolomoysky.

=== Departure from Ukraine ===
On February 26, 2022, during the beginning of the full-scale Russian invasion, he and his brother Hryhoriy left Ukraine without customs clearance, which led to the launch of an investigation by the State Bureau of Investigation against customs officers. When leaving, the Surkis did not declare any cash, and the Hungarian customs office cleared $17.5 million. Later, Ihor Surkis called this information untrue.

== See also ==
- A-Bank
