= Denis Gorbunenko =

- Born: December 9, 1973 (age 52); Donetsk (Ukraine)
- Education: Oxford Brookes University
- Occupations: Entrepreneur, investor, financier, banker
- Years active: 1992 – present

Denis Gorbunenko (born 9 December 1973) is a Ukrainian-British banker, entrepreneur and investor. Previously he served as head of several Ukrainian banks, including Rodovid Bank, Kyiv International Bank, Kreditprombank, and others. From 2009 he has been based in the United Kingdom and has been a private equity investor.

== Early life and education ==
Denis Gorbunenko was born on 9 December 1973 in Donetsk, Ukraine. His father, Volodymyr Gorbunenko, was a banker, and his mother, Valentyna Gorbunenko, was a physician.

In 1996, he graduated from the Donetsk State Academy of Management with a degree in management in the Non-Production Field.

In 1997–1998, he studied at Oxford Brookes University, where he defended his master's thesis on "Foreign Direct Investment as a way to enter the Ukrainian Market" and received a Master of Business Administration (MBA) degree.

== Career ==
Gorbunenko started his career during his first year of study at the Donetsk Academy. From 1992 to 1998, he worked at INKO Joint Stock Bank, holding the positions of leading specialist, and later head of the department for organization and control of branches and deputy manager of the bank's Donetsk branch. In 1998, he led the liabilities department at Kyiv-Privat Joint Stock Bank.

At the same year, he led the international payments and operations department at Kyiv International Bank, established by Rabobank (Netherlands) and the European Bank for Reconstruction and Development.

From 1999 to 2004, he worked at OJSC Kreditprombank. For five years, he has held the positions of Deputy Chairman of the management board, Deputy Chairman of the supervisory board and a member of the supervisory board of OJSC Kreditprombank.

From 2004 to 2009, Gorbunenko worked at Rodovid BANK. He started as a deputy chairman, later became the head of the financial institution and a minority shareholder. The bank's assets grew 18-fold in five years, reaching $2.75 billion at the end of 2008 and at the time of Gorbunenko's resignation in January 2009. On 13 January 2009, Gorbunenko left Rodovid Bank due to a conflict with some of the bank's shareholders over the sale of a part of his shares without the financier's approval. He decided to start his own business.

Gorbunenko was twice honored as the Best Financier of the Year at the prestigious all-Ukrainian "Person of the Year" awards in 2006 and 2007.

In 2009, Gorbunenko and his family relocated to the UK, where he launched his investment ventures.

In 2012, Denis Gorbunenko invested £3 million in the British broker Seymour Pierce. Although he was a creditor and explored the option of acquiring a controlling stake, the acquisition did not occur as the CEO of Seymour Pierce sold assets to a competitor.

In 2013, Gorbunenko invested in the purchase of the Austrian investment group EPIC Invest (Raga Establishment Limited), which owned the rights to the strategic telecoms asset in Ukraine, UKRTELECOM. In 2018, Gorbunenko's company Raga Establishment Limited was at the center of a legal dispute over the sale of Ukrtelecom to Rinat Akhmetov's assets. In 2020, the dispute ended with the signing of a settlement agreement with a payment in favor of Raga Establishment Limited.

In 2019–2021, Gorbunenko attempted to acquire Ukrainian bank Sich. While the Antimonopoly Committee of Ukraine approved his purchase of the bank's shares, the National Bank of Ukraine denied him the necessary permission, and the bank was subsequently removed from the market.

Over the past 15 years, Denis Gorbunenko has invested in private equity and foreign capital projects in the UK, with a focus on the financial, banking, real estate, and construction sectors. His real estate endeavors include acquiring and renovating luxury residential properties, as well as managing premium assets for high-net-worth individuals (HNWIs) in the UK.
