= APEKS-BANK =

Defunct Ukrainian bank

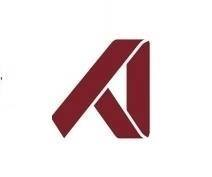
- APEKS Bank logo

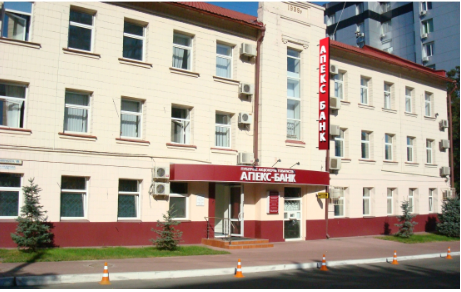
- APEKS-BANK Head Office in Kyiv, Ukraine in 2015
- Native name: ПАТ «АПЕКС-БАНК»
- Type: Public joint stock company
- Industry: Financial services
- Founded: November 18, 2009
- Defunct: August 23, 2017
- Fate: Closed by its shareholders
- Headquarters: Kyiv, Ukraine
- Products: Banking services
- Website: www.apeksbank.com.ua

APEKS-BANK was a Ukrainian bank registered with the National Bank of Ukraine which operated between 2009 and 2017.

The Bank was established as an open joint stock company with authorized capital of ₴80 million. In 2014, increasing of the authorized capital of the Bank to the amount of ₴205 million was implemented.

On August 23, 2017, the shareholders of the bank made a decision to terminate banking activities without liquidation of the bank entity.

== History ==
=== 2009 ===
The National Bank of Ukraine registered the "APEKS-BANK" in the form of Joint Stock Company with an authorized capital of ₴80 million (decision agreed on April 30), and at the end of the year there is an increase of the authorized capital of the Bank to the amount of ₴120 million.

The bank became a participant of the Guarantee Fund of Individuals’ Deposits and is connected to the electronic payment system of the National Bank of Ukraine.

In accordance with the decision of the unscheduled general shareholders' meeting from July 14, 2009, OJSC "APEKS-BANK" was reorganized to the Public Joint Stock Company "APEKS-BANK" (decision agreed by the National Bank of Ukraine on September 16 and registered in the Unified State Register of Legal Entities and Individual entrepreneurs on September 28). The license No255 of the National Bank of Ukraine for conduction of banking transactions was received.

=== 2010 ===
Bank became a member of the Ukrainian Stock Exchange and received the status of a member of the Association "Ukrainian Stock Traders". That same year PJSC "APEKS-BANK" became a member of the international payment system SWIFT and was licensed by the State Commission on Securities and Stock Market to conduct professional activities in the stock market.

=== 2011 ===
The bank adopted and implemented the decision of the sole owner to increase the authorized capital from ₴70 million to the amount of ₴190 million. The first branch in Chernivtsy was opened (Chernivtsi Regional Directorate) and opened a branch No2, No3 and No4 in Chernivtsi, No5 in Donetsk and No6 in Lviv (Lviv Regional Directorate).

In accordance with the decision of the National Bank of Ukraine banking and general licenses for execution of currency transactions No 255 was reissued. The Bank became a founding member of the Association "Independent Association of Ukrainian Banks".

=== 2012 ===
The banks extended its general License No255-2 for execution of currency transactions, under which the Bank has received the right to conduct operations with banking metals, as well as the currency in international markets. The Bank opened a branch number 8, but closed Branches number 3 and 4 in Chernivtsi.

=== 2013 ===
Bank opened six offices in cities such as Dnipropetrovsk and Chernivtsi.

=== 2014 ===
The National Bank of Ukraine registered the increase of the authorized capital of PJSC «APEKS BANK» to ₴205 million. In December Kharkiv regional Office was opened.

=== 2015 ===
In January Khmelnytskyi regional Office was opened. The National Bank of Ukraine granted permission to PJSC "APEKS-BANK" to register borrowed funds on the conditions of subordinated debt in foreign currencies to the Bank's capital for a term of 5 years, by over ₴80m in equivalent.

=== 2017 ===
The bank was closed on August 23, 2017, when the shareholders of the bank made a decision to terminate banking activities without liquidation of the bank entity.

== See also ==
- List of banks in Ukraine
