= Sportbank =

Ukrainian bank

- Industry: Banking
- Founded: 2019
- Defunct: 2024
- Fate: Closed by parent company
- Successor: Taskombank
- Headquarters: Ukraine
- Area served: Ukraine
- Products: Neobank, debit card, mobile banking app
- Parent: Taskombank
- Website: sportbank.ua

Sportbank (Ukrainian: спортба́нк) was a Ukrainian bank. The bank operated as a neobank with almost all services being provided via mobile app. It was designed to focus on sports and sports related topics. The bank stopped its operations on May 6, 2024 and transferred its clients to its parent company Taskombank.

After the Russian invasion of Ukraine in 2022, the bank redesigned its operations to allow easier donation to the Armed Forces of Ukraine. The bank was also the first member of eSupport, the Ukrainian government's COVID-19 stimulus program.

== History ==
Sportbank was launched in 2019 by Nick Izmailov and Denys Saprykin.

According to DELO business outlet, TAScombank had invested nearly $17m into the development of Sportbank. In 2019, Sportbank won the "Best Ukrainian FinTech-startup" award from PaySpace Magazine Awards.

In December 2021 Sportbank joined Ukrainian governments anti-COVID finance assistance program e-Support (єПідтримка). In June 2022, Sportbank, together with Run Ukraine, Binance, and other partners, launched an education project — Move-To-Earn.

In March 2022, the bank stopped financing cash back bonuses due to the invasion.

In August 2022, the number of customers reached 500,000.

On May 6, 2024 the site was closed for new applications and existing clients were moved to TAScombank.

== Branding ==
The Ukrainian goalkeeper of the national team Andriy Pyatov was a brand ambassador for Sportbank.

The debit card is usually being delivered by a courier, who is an employee of the bank, or it can be delivered at Foxtrot retail chain or Nova Poshta postal service.

Debit and credit Visa cards were issued by TAScombank.
