= Delta Bank =

Commercial bank in Ukraine

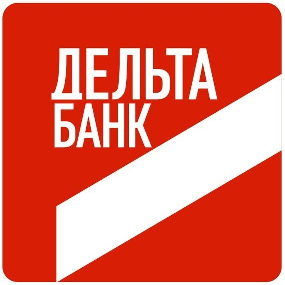
- Company type: Public Joint-Stock Company
- Industry: banking, investment
- Founded: February 15, 2006
- Defunct: 2 October 2015
- Headquarters: Kyiv, Ukraine
- Key people: Mykola Lagyn, Olena Popova
- Services: Financial services
- Net income: ▲ ₴302.701 million (2013)
- Total assets: ▲ ₴55.298 billion (December 2013)
- Owner: Mykola Lagyn (70.61%); Cargill Financial Services (29.39%)
- Number of employees: over 10 000
- Website: deltabank.com.ua

Delta Bank (Ukrainian: Дельта Банк) was one of the largest commercial banks in Ukraine. It was founded in February 2006 by Ukrainian businessman Mykola Lagun. It had its headquarters in Kyiv. Since 2006 the bank quickly increased due to consumer credit. The Bank ranked among the largest banks in its category according to the classification of the National Bank of Ukraine. In 2013 the Delta Bank provided services to 4.6 million customers in Ukraine.

In July 2011, Cargill Financial Services International Inc. acquired 30% authorized capital stock in Delta Bank.

On 2 March 2015 Delta Bank declared insolvent. The bank cited risky policies during a period of economic turmoil as the reason for its bankruptcy. On 2 October 2015 the National Bank of Ukraine revoked its bank licence and liquidated the bank.

== See also ==
- List of banks in Ukraine
