= Ukrgasbank =

Public bank in Ukraine

Joint Stock Bank Ukrgasbank
- Trade name: UGB
- Native name: ПАТ АБ Укргазбанк
- Romanized name: Aktsionernyi bank Ukrhazbank
- Formerly: Interhazbnk (1995-1997); Khadzhybei (1993-1995)
- Company type: State-owned enterprise as a Public Joint-stock company
- Industry: Financial services
- Founded: July 21, 1993; 32 years ago
- Headquarters: Kyiv, Ukraine
- Number of locations: 247 bank branches
- Services: Banking services, insurance
- Owner: Government of Ukraine via Ministry of Finance of Ukraine (94.94%)
- Number of employees: 3,500 (2023)
- Website: ukrgasbank.com

Ukrgasbank (d.b.a UGB) is a Ukrainian public bank headquartered in Kyiv that was established in 1993. In early 2024, it was confirmed by the National Bank of Ukraine as one of the country's systemically important banks.

== History ==
Hajibey Bank was established in Odesa in 1993. In 1995 it relocated its head office to Kyiv, renamed itself Intergasbank and specialized on clients in Ukraine's energy industry such as Ukrgas and Intergas. Until 2009, its largest shareholder was Vasyl Horbal. That year, however, the bank underwent financial distress and was recapitalized by the Ukrainian state, resulting in public ownership of nearly 82 percent of equity capital.

When Anatolii Brezvin was appointed chairman of the Ukrgasbank board of directors in 2010, the decision was criticized as contrary to the law of Ukraine which required this position be filled by a person with three years of experience operating a bank.

Ukrgasbank had a strong commercial performance in the 2010s. In 2015 it acquired Bank Kyiv, and became the country's fourth-largest bank by total assets. The Ministry of Finance announced its intent to privatize it in 2018–2019. As of 2019, however, the government of Ukraine owned 95 percent of its equity capital, and Ukrgasbank is still under public ownership as of 2024.

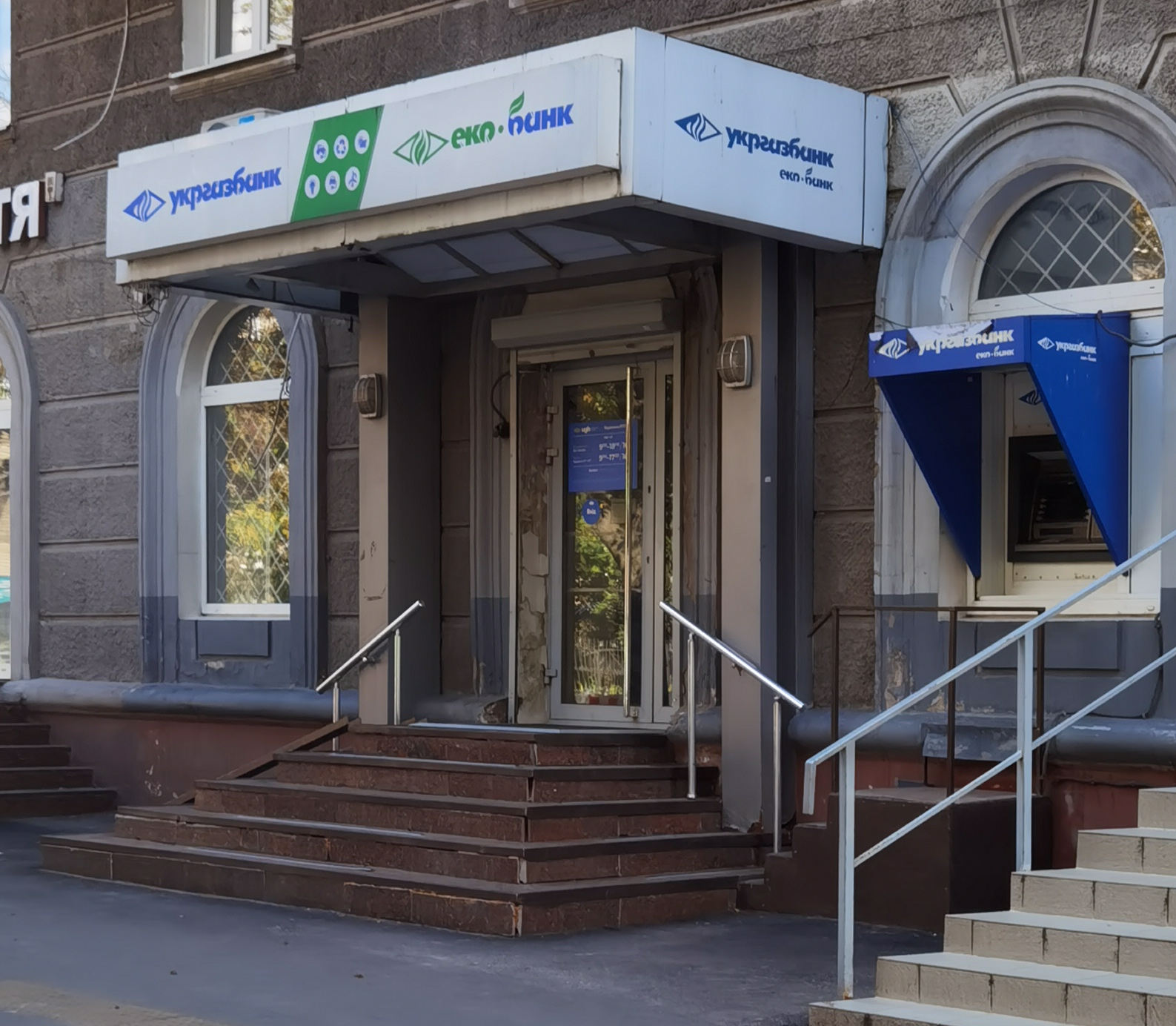
Branch in Dnipro

By 2024, the bank had 220 branches servicing around 1.5 million individuals and over 87,000 corporate and SME customers.

In April 2024, Ukrgasbank announced a partnership with the European Bank for Reconstruction and Development to provide credit to Ukrainian small businesses despite the difficult conditions of the Russo-Ukrainian War. Ukrgasbank has also received funding from the International Finance Corporation.

In August 2025, Ukraine’s Financial Stability Council approved the planned privatization of Ukrgasbank, concluding that the sale of the state-owned lender would not have a negative impact on the country’s financial system. The decision formed part of a broader strategy, supported by international financial institutions, to reduce state ownership in the banking sector despite the ongoing war, with valuation and timing identified as key considerations before any transaction proceeds.

== See also ==
- Kyrylo Shevchenko
- Banking in Ukraine
- List of banks in Ukraine
