= RwS Bank =

Former Ukrainian bank

- Company type: Joint-stock company
- Founded: October 25, 1991; 34 years ago
- Headquarters: Ukraine, Kyiv, Prorizna str., 6
- Key people: Mykhailo Melnyk (acting Chairman of the Board)
- Operating income: ₴300,039
- Net income: ₴56,48 mln (as of 01.08.2022)
- Total assets: ₴4,808,864 (as of 01.08.2022)
- Website: rwsbank.com.ua

RwS bank was a Ukrainian bank founded in 1991 in Kyiv, which went by several different names over time. From 2007 to 2013, it was owned by Swedbank and operated as Swedbank (Ukraine).

On 4 November 2025, RwS Bank was classified as insolvent. In January 2026, selected assets and deposit liabilities of RwS Bank, including the transfer of around 13,000 retail customers, were awarded by the National Bank of Ukraine to Estonian fintech company iute Group following an open tender.

== History ==
In October 1991 the bank JSCB Intellect was created. Then, the bank changed its name to JSCB Kyiv-Privat. In 2001, the bank received investment from Paris-based Société Générale and again changed its name to JSCB Société Générale Ukraine.

In 2007, the bank ownership changed, and its name became CJSC TAS-Investbank. Then in October 2007, it was renamed as JSCB TAS-Commerzbank. In December 2007, Stockholm-based Swedbank invested in the bank, which was renamed as Swedbank Invest. In 2009, the bank changed its corporate form and its name was again changed to PJSC Swedbank.

In 2013, the Swedbank Group decided to exit the Ukrainian market. The bank was sold to new Ukrainian investors, who later rebranded the bank as Omega Bank.

In June 2015, Ukrainian business group LLC owned by Ruslan Demchak invested into the bank and renamed it as RwS Bank.

Since January 2021, Oksana Kotlyarevska has been the chairman of the board, having replaced Oleksand Stetsiuk at this position.

RwS bank had banking license No. 277 and provided a full range of banking services to customers such as settlement and cash services, foreign exchange transactions, bank guarantees, factoring services, etc. As at early 2017, it was one of the largest taxpayers in the Ukrainian banking sector. In 2019, it was awarded the «Experts' Choice - Municipal Deposit».

As of 2025, RwS Bank had 16 branches: 7 branches in Kyiv, two branches in Lviv, and one branch each in Odesa, Vinnytsia, Dnipro, Korosten, Ternopil, Ivano-Frankivsk and Chortkiv. The bank's head office was located at 29/58 Vvedenska Street, Kyiv, Ukraine. The central branch was located at 6 Prorizna Street, Kyiv, Ukraine.

== Ownership (2024) ==
- Individual Deposit Guarantee Fund
- Independent Association of Banks of Ukraine
- Union of Ukrainian Entrepreneurs
- Association of Ukrainian Banks
- MasterCard
- Prostir
- Portmone
- S.W.I.F.T.

== Board (2024) ==
- Mykhailo Melnyk — acting Chairman
- Vasyl Kolesnyk — member of the board, Vice Chairman of the Board
- Valentyna Vaskovska — member of the board, Vice Chairman of the Board
- Olena Burdina — member of the board, chief accountant
- Parasich Vyacheslav - member of the Board, Аcting chief risk manager
- Mykhailo Vidiakin — Chairman of Supervisory Board
- Iryna Havrylchuk — Deputy Chairman of the Supervisory Board
- Vitalyi Myhashko – member of the supervisory board
- Serhiy Yaremenko – member of the supervisory board
- Dmytro Seredenko – member of the supervisory board
- Pavlo Savchuk – member of the supervisory board

=== External links ===
- Official website
- «RwS bank» in Facebook
- «RwS bank» in Instagram
- «RwS bank» in LinkedIn
- «RwS bank» in YouTube
