= Rodovid Bank =

Ukrainian universal commercial bank

OJSC "Rodovid Bank"
- Type: Public
- Industry: Financial services
- Founded: 1990
- Defunct: February 25, 2016
- Fate: Declared insolvent and transferred to the jurisdiction of the Ukrainian Deposit Guarantee Fund
- Headquarters: Kyiv, Ukraine
- Key people: Serhiy Bubka (President), Denis Gorbunenko (Chairman & CEO), Dmytro Egorenko (First Deputy Chairman)
- Net income: −1,399,000,000 (2011)
- Website: www.rodovidbank.com

Rodovid Bank (Ukrainian: РОДОВІД БАНК) was a Ukrainian commercial bank providing its services to private individuals and companies throughout Ukraine. The bank operated from 1990 until 2016 when it was declared insolvent in.

The bank was established in 1990 as JSCB “Percombank”. In 2004 its name was changed for OJSC "Rodovid Bank" within the rebranding program. In 2009 the state acquired 99.97% of the shares in Rodovid Bank, as a result of a government bailout.

On February 25, 2016 the Ministry of Finance and the National Bank of Ukraine decided to cease the banks remaining operations declaring it insolvent and transferred it to the jurisdiction of the Deposit Guarantee Fund.

== History ==
=== 1990s - Founding and growth ===
JSCB “Percombank” founded in 1990. By 2003 JSCB “Percombank” held 97th position among the Ukrainian banks in terms of total assets and the 67th line in terms of the retail loan portfolio. The Bank’s regional network comprised 2 offices and 1 branch.

=== 2004 - New management ===
The Bank was purchased by the new management team, the board of Rodovid Bank was headed by Denis Gorbunenko. The Bank rehabilitation program was introduced including changing of the Bank’s name to Rodovid Bank under the rebranding program. The program implied elaboration of the development strategy and replacement of the top and middle-tier management. The Bank’s equity was increased by ₴85 million the regional network expansion was in progress. Cooperation with the auditors was initiated with respect to the preparation of financial statements in accordance with International Financial Reporting Standards.

=== 2005 - Growth across Ukraine ===
The network of lending outlets covered nearly all the regions of Ukraine. The Bank’s regional network comprised 26 regional offices. RODOVID BANK became one of the leaders in terms of growth on Ukrainian banking sector exhibiting 330% increase of the loan portfolio and 81% increase of the deposit portfolio. The underwriting center was opened. The contracts were signed with the top retail networks under the co-branding program development.

=== 2006 - Public listing ===
19.9% of the Bank’s shares were placed on PFTS stock exchange amongst the foreign institutional investors. The funds raised in the amount of US$50 million where invested into further development. Rodovid Bank became a principal member of Visa and Mastercard international payment systems. A 24-hour call center was opened. Moody’s international rating agency assigned “B3” credit rating to Rodovid Bank. The Bank became one of Top-20 banks in Ukraine in terms of total assets. The bank’s regional network comprised 51 regional offices and 2 branches.

The private placement transaction of 19% of the bank's shares was called the best transaction of 2006.

=== 2007 - International activity ===
The bank intensified its international activities: signed the agreement with the EBRD regarding funding micro, small and medium-sized enterprises; cooperation with the World Bank was launched in the area of stimulating export development. The first syndicated loan was raised for the amount of US$20 million and the club loan for the amount of US$14 million. Fitch Ratings international rating agency assigned “B-“ credit rating to Rodovid Bank. Process to improve the internal corporate governance system with assistance of the International Finance Corporation was initiated. The Bank’s equity was increased by ₴620 million. The Bank’s regional network comprised 146 regional offices and 2 branches.

Rodovid Bank was awarded the title of "The most dynamic bank of 2007" by Mastercard International and took second place in the "Bank of the year 2007" nomination. Ukrainian association "EMA" granted Rodovid Bank "The best acquirer" award. The bank took ninth place in the "Largest card issuer" rating according to this association. International payment system Visa awarded the bank two diplomas "For innovation card programs" and "For successful development of co-branding projects".

=== 2008 - Expansion ===
On January 10, 2008, Rodovid Bank held the 19th position in terms of assets amongst 181 Ukrainian banks, with ₴13.368 million total assets, a loan portfolio of ₴9.292 million, and deposit portfolio of ₴7.986 million. The bank's equity was ₴1.213 million, net income was ₴72.367 million. Rodovid bank was represented in all regions of Ukraine with a network of 170 registered branches categorized as universal offices, retail offices, specialized offices and regional departments. The bank served 786 thousand private individuals and over 8 thousand legal entities.

=== 2009 - Limiting withdrawals ===
Denis Gorbunenko, the Chairman, left his post. His former first deputy Dmiry Egorenko held his position. The bank, in a bid to preserve capital has limited withdrawals to approximately US$35 per day.

=== 2010 - Nationalised ===
As of April 1, 2010 assets of Rodovid Bank made up ₴12.795 billion, loans and customers' liabilities ₴5.38 billion, equity capital ₴2.043 billion.

The National Bank of Ukraine appointed Mykola Onischenko as temporary administrator of Rodovid Bank, to replace Serhii Scherbyna.
The bank was nationalized by the Ukrainian government.

=== 2016 - Insolvent ===
On February 25, 2016 the Ukraine Ministry of Finance and the National Bank of Ukraine decided to cease the bank remaining operations declaring it insolvent and transferred it under the jurisdiction of the Deposit Guarantee Fund.

== Branches ==
During its peak in 2008 before its collapse, the bank had:

- 170 registered outlets
- 266 ATMs
- 49 Info-kiosks
- 560 consumer finance outlets

RODOVID Regional Department outside	RODOVID Retail Branch outside	RODOVID Universal Branch outside	RODOVID Universal Branch inside
