= ESupport =

Ukrainian COVID-19 vaccination program

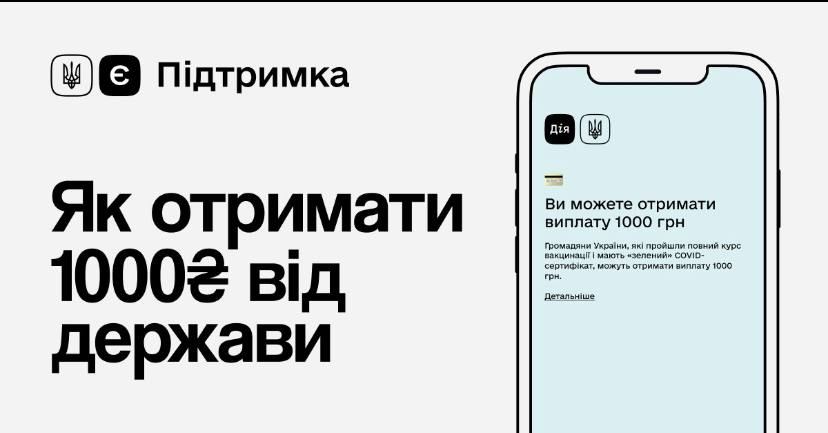
Information banner of eSupport program

eSupport is a Ukrainian state program aimed at supporting vaccination against the COVID-19 pandemic, and boosting the sectors of the economy most affected by the pandemic by providing any vaccinated Ukrainian with a one-time payout of ₴1,000 (near US$40).

== Overview ==
The program had four major aims. The first was to support COVID-19 vaccination, as only vaccinated people could get money. The second aim was to support the health of the population and those industries most affected by the pandemic, in particular creative industries and, above all, culture, as well as physical culture and sports and transport. The third aim was to increase the level of digitalization in Ukraine. According to this program, monetary payments are made to citizens of Ukraine who have been vaccinated against COVID-19. Payment is made in the amount of 1,000 hryvnias. A vaccinated person can spend these funds on buying books, tickets to the cinema, theater, and concerts, spending them in sports clubs, as well as on railway tickets for Ukrzaliznytsia trains. In total, 8 billion hryvnias have been allocated to the program from the state budget of Ukraine at the initiative of the President of Ukraine, Volodymyr Zelenskyy.

The corresponding changes to the budget were adopted by the Verkhovna Rada of Ukraine on December 2, 2021, and signed by the President on December 8, 2021.

Subsequently, the program was extended to pay employees affected by the Russian invasion of Ukraine from February 24, 2022.
