= Finance and Credit (bank) =

Former bank in Kyiv, Ukraine

- Industry: banking, investment
- Founded: 1990
- Defunct: December 17, 2015
- Headquarters: Kyiv, Ukraine
- Key people: Kostyantin Valentynovych Zhevago, Volodymyr G. Khlyvniuk
- Services: Financial services
- Owner: Kostyantin Valentynovych Zhevago
- Number of employees: 4741
- Website: fcbank.com.ua

Finance and Credit (bank) was a Ukrainian commercial bank with its head office located in Kyiv. Bank Finance and Credit was established in 1990 and according to the National Bank of Ukraine ratings it belonged to the group of the major banks in Ukraine by the volume of assets. Net assets on 01.05.2010 made up ₴20.699 billion, the Bank authorised capital made up UAH 2 billion. On 01.07.2010 Bank Finance and System includes 16 branches and 305 outlets over Ukraine.

In spring 2015 the bank was put on the National Bank of Ukraine list of problem banks. In August 2015 the bank registered an issue of additional securities worth slightly under ₴2 billion. On 17 December 2015 the National Bank of Ukraine withdrew the banking license of Finance and Credit and liquidated the bank.

== Participants of the Bank ==
Participants of the Bank	%
"Askania" Ltd	48,8773
CJSC "F&C Realty"	47,0592
«Kyivmedpreparat Ukraine»	3,01
"Naftogaz Ukrayiny" National Joint Stock Company	0,6343
Open Joint Stock Company "Chemical Reagents Plant"	0,0008

== Bank auditor - KPMG ==
KPMG is a professional services organizations in Ukraine. It has had a representation in Ukraine since 1992 and a wholly owned Ukrainian legal entity since 1997.

== Investigation ==
On 28 December 2022 Kostyantyn Zhevago was arrested in Courchevel, France at the request of Ukraine's State Bureau of Investigation. Assets belonging to Zhevago have been seized. The investigation also involves the directors of JSC Finance and Credit Bank. On 10 November 2023, the Court of Cassation (the Supreme Court of France) ruled that Zhevago should not be extradited to Ukraine. The court verdict read: "the applicant state (Ukraine) is unable to guarantee that Mr. Zhevago will be tried by a court that can provide basic procedural guarantees and protection of defense rights."

== Ratings ==
- AUB rating
- Moody's ratings
- "Kredit-Reyting" ratings

== AVERS ==
AVERS International Money Transfer Service was founded in March, 2005 as an instant money transfer system of "Finance & Credit" Bank. Presently, AVERS network comprises 81 countries of the world.

== Membership ==
- Ukrainian interbank currency exchange (UICE)
- Ukrainian Stock Exchange (USE)
- Ukrainian Banking Association (UBA)
- Off-exchange Commercial Stock System (OCSS)
- Ukrainian Exchange, OJSC
- Stock Exchange "Perspektiva"
- Kyiv Bank Union (KBU)
- The Fund of underwriting of natural persons deposits
- Visa International (Fundamental member)
- Mastercard International (Fundamental member)
- Western Union (Direct agent of the company)
- MoneyGram (Direct agent of system)
- АneliK (Direct agent of system)
- IBRD (agent bank servicing credit lines that are guaranteed by the Cabinet of Ministers of Ukraine)
- Professional association of the registrars and depositaries (PARD)

== Previous licenses and authorizations possessed ==
- Banking Licence No. 28 dated 09.10.2009
- Licence of the Securities and Stock Market State Commission АВ No.493406 dated 28.10.2009 on professional activities on the stock market - securities trade activity (broker activity).
- Licence of the Securities and Stock Market State Commission АВ No.493407 dated 28.10.2009 on professional activities on the stock market - securities trade activity (dealer activity).
- Licence of the Securities and Stock Market State Commission АВ No.493408 dated 28.10.2009 on professional activities on the stock market - securities trade activity (underwriting).
- Licence of the Securities and Stock Market State Commission АВ No.493416 dated 28.10.2009 on professional activities on the stock market – securities custodian activity.

== See also ==
- List of banks in Ukraine
