= Pavlo Matvienko =

Ukrainian politician and economist (born 1973)

- Павло́ Матвіє́нко
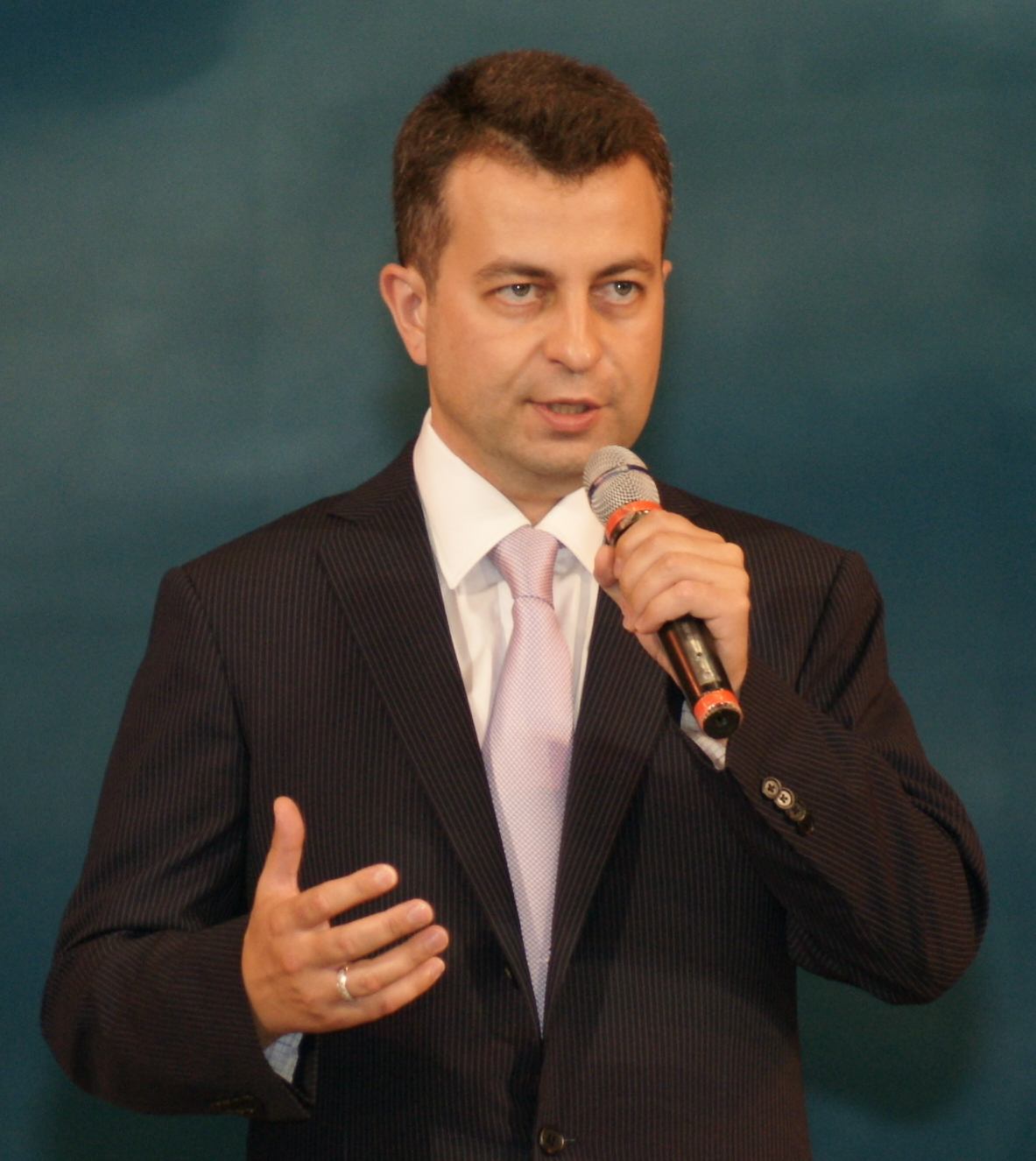
- Matvienko in 2008

People's Deputy of Ukraine
- In office 14 May 2002 – 25 May 2006
- Constituency: Zhytomyr Oblast, No. 66

Personal details
- Born: 6 August 1973 (age 53) Dnipropetrovsk, Ukrainian SSR, Soviet Union (Ukraine)
- Party: All-Ukrainian Union "Democrats" (1995–2013)
- Spouse: Nataliia Matvienko (m. 1996)
- Children: 2
- Parent(s): Volodymyr Matvienko (father); Halyna Pylypivna (mother)
- Education: Kyiv National Economic University; European University
- Occupation: Economist; politician
- Awards: Honorary Diploma of the Cabinet of Ministers of Ukraine

Pavlo Volodymyrovych Matvienko (Ukrainian: Павло́ Володи́мирович Матвіє́нко; born 6 August 1973) is a Ukrainian politician and entrepreneur who is the chairman of the All-Ukrainian Union "Democrats" since March 2001, and a member of the 4th Ukrainian Verkhovna Rada from 2002 to 2006.

== Early years ==
Matvienko Pavlo Volodymyrovych was born on 6 August 1973, in Dnipropetrovsk in the family of a financier, Ukrainian.

Father Matvienko Volodymyr (1938) — at that time held the position of manager of the Dnipropetrovsk Regional Office of the Budbank of the USSR, mother Matviienko Halyna (1941).

He graduated from secondary school No. 125 in Kyiv, where the family moved permanently in 1979. During his studies, he was actively involved in sports, paying great attention to self-development and self-improvement.

Inspired by the example of his father, who in 1991 was appointed chairman of the Board of the National Bank of Ukraine (NBU), and later became the founder and chairman of the board of Prominvestbank PJSC, decided to connect his life with the economic sphere.

== Education ==
In 1995, he graduated from the Faculty of international economic relations of the Kyiv state economic University, now KNEU named after V. Hetman, with a degree in economics with knowledge of a foreign language.

In parallel with studying at KSEU, in 1992-1994 he studied with an in-depth study of professional disciplines at Thames Valley University European and International Studies in the UK ("TVU" London).

In 2004, on the basis of KNEU named after V. Hetman, he defended his PhD thesis on the topic Development of monetary relations in the transformational economy of Ukraine, received the degree of candidate of Economic Sciences in the specialty "Finance, money circulation and loans".

In 2012, he received a bachelor's degree in law, graduating from the Private Higher Education Institution "European University". He is fluent in Ukrainian, English and Russian.

== Banking ==
He started his career in 1994 as an economist in the International Department of Prominvestbank PJSC.

In 1996, he held the positions of chief economist and head of the International Information and Correspondent Relations Department of the Department of international relations, methodology and statistics of the International Department of Prominvestbank PJSC.

In 1997, he was appointed deputy chairman of the management board of National Credit JSCB.

From 1998 to 2002, he was chairman of the Management Board of National Credit JSCB. In the period from 2006 to 2008, after completing his parliamentary powers, he was appointed chairman of the Supervisory Board of National Credit JSCB.

== Political career ==
In March 1998 he became a candidate for people's Deputies of Ukraine from the party of National Economic Development Party of Ukraine, No. 49 on the list. At the time of the election: member of the National Economic Development Party of Ukraine, Deputy Chairman of the management board of "National Credit" JSCB (Kyiv).

In June 2000 became a candidate for deputy of Ukraine, Electoral District No. 221, Kyiv, took 3rd place out of 13 candidates. At the time of the election: Chairman of the Management Board of "National Credit" JSCB.

People's deputy of Ukraine of the 4th convocation (2002-2006), Electoral District No. 66 of Zhytomyr region, from the party of National Economic Development Party of Ukraine. Received more than 30% of the vote. At the time of the election: Chairman of the Board of "National Credit" JSCB, chairman of the party of National Economic Development Party of Ukraine (NEDPU).

Member of the United Ukraine faction (May–June 2002), member of the European choice group (June 2002-November 2003), member of the Regions of Ukraine faction (November 2003-February 2005), member of the Party of industrialists and entrepreneurs of Ukraine faction (since April 2005). Member of the Verkhovna Rada Committee on finance and banking (June 2002-May 2006). In March 2006, he was a candidate for people's Deputies of Ukraine from the National Economic Development Party of Ukraine, No. 1 on the list. At the time of the election: people's deputy of Ukraine, chairman of the National Economic Development Party of Ukraine. From December 2008-January 2011, and from January 2013-November 2014, he served as an assistant-consultant to the people's deputy of Ukraine.

Chief consultant of the secretariat of the Verkhovna Rada Committee on rules of Procedure, parliamentary ethics and ensuring the activities of the Verkhovna Rada of Ukraine (February 2011-January 2013).

During his parliamentary activity in the Korostenskyi Electoral District No. 66 of the Zhytomyr region, he actively contributed to the development of its infrastructure.

During 2002-2006, about 5 million hryvnias were allocated to help institutions and individual segments of the population, and more than 20 socially significant infrastructure facilities were built in the district.

== Personal life ==
Matvienko's father is Volodymyr Matvienko (born 1938), is a prominent figure in Ukrainian politics, entrepreneurship, artistry, and philanthropy. His wife, Nataliia Matvienko (born 1975), works at Prominvestbank of Ukraine, and together they have two children: Halyna (born 1997) and Volodymyr (born 1998). They have been married since 1996.

Pavlo Matvienko is of the Christian Orthodox faith, actively participates in charity work and represents the interests of Ukraine at the international level, introducing the world community to the culture and traditions of their native land, drawing attention to its history and socio-political events in which it lives.

== Awards ==
On 26 December 2003, he was awarded the certificate of honor of the Cabinet of Ministers of Ukraine for his significant personal contribution to the formation of a system of effective and politically responsible government and the implementation of socio-economic reforms.
