= Matviyenko =

Matviyenko (Ukrainian: Матвієнко), sometimes transliterated Matviienko, Matvijenko, or Matvienko, is a patronymic surname of Ukrainian origin. It is derived from the first name Matviy, equivalent to English Matthew.

It may refer to:

- Anatoliy Matviyenko (1953–2020), Ukrainian politician
- Antonina Matviyenko (born 1981), Ukrainian singer
- Danylo Matviienko (born 1990), Ukrainian baritone
- Dmitri Matviyenko (born 1989), Russian footballer
- Dmytro Matviyenko (born 1992), Ukrainian-Russian footballer
- Igor Matvienko (born 1960), Russian musician
- Ihor Matviyenko (born 1971), Ukrainian sailor
- Mykola Matviyenko (born 1996), Ukrainian footballer
- Nina Matviienko (born 1947), Ukrainian singer
- Pavlo Matvienko (born 1973), Ukrainian economist and politician
- Lisa Matviyenko (born 1997), Ukrainian-born German tennis player
- Sergey Matviyenko (born 1972), Kazakhstani wrestler
- Valentina Matviyenko (born 1949), Russian politician
- Viktor Matviyenko (1948–2018), Ukrainian football coach and player
- Vladislav Matviyenko (born 1967), Russian football coach and player
- Volodymyr Matvienko (born 1938), Ukrainian economist and politician
- Yaroslav Matviyenko (born 1998), Russian footballer
