= Nakhodka Fertilizer Plant =

Nakhodka Fertilizer Planty (NZMU)
- Company type: Closed Joint-Stock Company
- Industry: Chemical Industry
- Founded: 2012
- Headquarters: Nakhodkinsky urban district, Primorsky region, Russia
- Products: methanol, nitrogen fertilizers, urea
- Owner: Artem Obolensky

Nakhodka Fertilizer Plant (translit. Nahodkinsky Zavod Mineralnih udobrenii abbreviated as NZMU, Russian: ЗАО «Находкинский завод минеральных удобрений») is an investment project for the construction of a plant for the production of methanol and nitrogen fertilizers in Primorsky region. In 2016, Artem Alekseevich Obolensky became 100% shareholder of the plant.

== Stages of project implementation ==
- January 2013 - Feasibility study. Toyo Engineering Corporation completed its work on preparing a feasibility study for NZMU construction.
- September 2015 - Contract with Gazprom Mezhregiongas Group on the supply of natural gas in the amount of 3.15 billion cubic meters per year.
- September 2016 - EPC-contract concluded.
- 2017 - Project documentation under the EPC-contract, basic project design.
- 2017 - 2018 - Purchase of equipment and placement of orders.
- October 2018 - February 2022 - Construction and installation of equipment (completion of work under the EPC-contract.)
- July 2016 - February 2022 - Completion of construction and commissioning works.
- April 2022 - Commercial production. Reaching full capacity.

== Operation ==
- Production of fertilizers, nitrogen compounds and other inorganic chemicals
- Production of plastics and synthetic resins
- Wholesale trade of fertilizers and agrochemicals
