= 1996 Ukrainian monetary reform =

Monetary reform in Ukraine

Ukrainian banknotes before and after the 1996 monetary reform

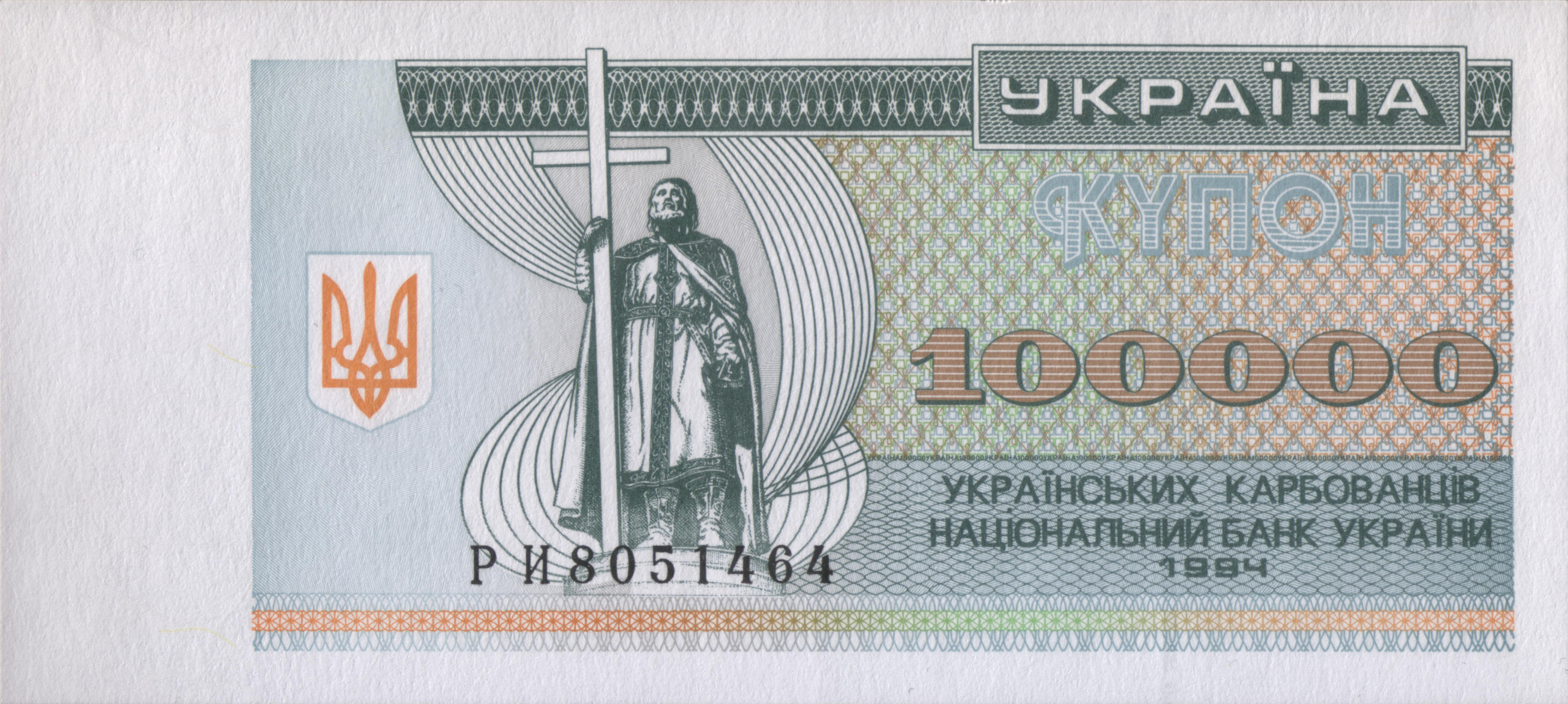
Obverse of a 100,000 karbovantsiv banknote, withdrawn following the reform

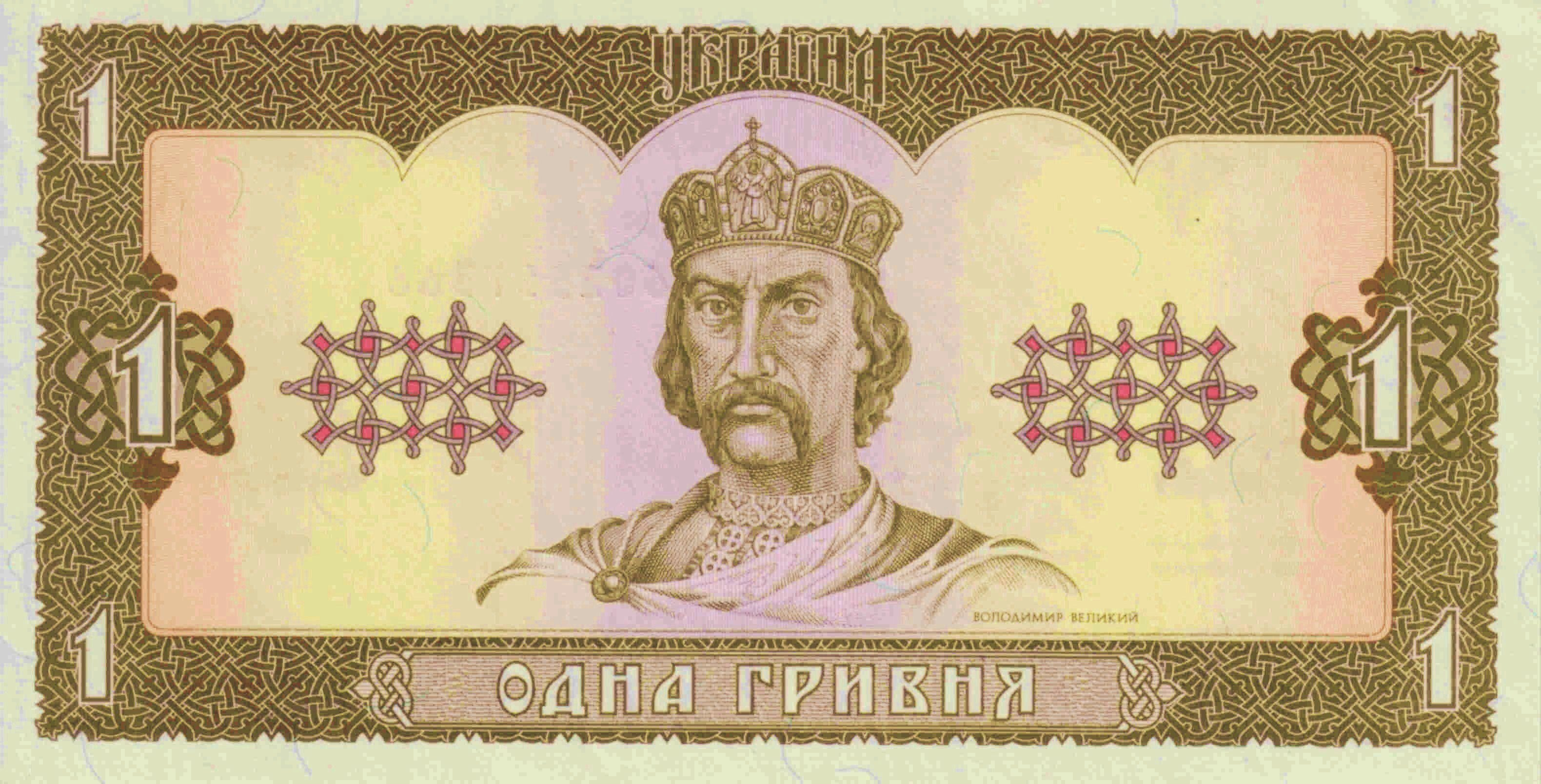
Obverse of a one hryvnia banknote, placed into circulation following the reform at a rate of 100,000 karbovantsiv

The 1996 Ukrainian monetary reform was carried out from 2 to 16 September 1996 according to a decree by president Leonid Kuchma, and oversaw the replacement of the Ukrainian karbovanets with the new Ukrainian hryvnia in accordance with the Constitution of Ukraine, adopted the same year. Karbovantsi were exchanged for hryvnias at a rate of 100,000 to 1, with exchanges continuing freely until 1998. The monetary reform helped to launch the political career of Viktor Yushchenko, who oversaw it in his capacity as head of the National Bank of Ukraine.

== Background ==
As part of the broader dissolution of the Soviet Union, Ukraine declared independence in August 1991. The declaration of independence noted the necessity of an independent monetary system and currency in order to establish Ukraine's financial and political independence from the Soviet Union. On 9 September 1991, a bill in the Verkhovna Rada (Ukrainian parliament) titled "On Introduction of Reusable Coupons Into Circulation on the Territory of the Republic" passed, which was followed on 10 January 1992 by the National Bank of Ukraine issuing temporary banknotes named "karbovanets", though they were also popularly known as "coupon-karbovanets". The former Soviet ruble continued to be accepted as legal tender until being taken out of circulation on 12 November 1992.

Following its introduction, the karbovanets was initially slightly above parity with the Soviet ruble due to a shortage of supply compared to demand. By April 1992, however, karbovantsi were circulating at such a level that they had reached parity with the former Soviet ruble, and in November 1992 all Soviet rubles were exchanged to karbovantsi in the form of cashless transfers. Intended to last for only four to six months, the karbovanets instead remained in use until 1996, bearing the brunt of inflationary pressures.

Canada and the United States began to print Ukraine's permanent new currency, the hryvnia, in 1992. Hyperinflation, however, made the introduction of a new currency pointless at the time. By 1993, the level of inflation on the karbovanets had reached 10,000% according to the National Bank. To introduce the hryvnia would cause rapid devaluation and leave it effectively worthless, so the Ukrainian government took the controversial decision to peg the karbovanets to the United States dollar. In doing so, it hoped to establish a sense of stability and trust in the economic situation, by which introduction of the hryvnia would become possible. Over the next two years, more favourable conditions were created by the strengthening of commercial and official exchange rates with the United States dollar.

US$1.00 exchange rate to UAK, yearly
1992	1993	1994	1995
208	4,539	31,700	147,463

In addition to hyperinflation, the karbovanets struggled from an almost total lack of security measures and poor paper, which enabled the creation of counterfeits by anyone owning a printer. As a result, almost 14 billion counterfeit karbovantsi were present in the economy by 1996. Seeking to counteract these problems, primary aim of the monetary reform was a policy of devaluation, as part of broader measures to establish economic stability with a new currency.

== Hryvnia production ==
The design for hryvnia banknotes was done by Ukrainian artist and writer Vasyl Lopata during an April 1991 competition for the currency of the Ukrainian SSR. Other participants in the competition besides Lopata included Oleksandr Danchenko, Vasyl Perevalskyi, Volodymyr Yurchyshyn, and Serhii Yakutovych. Lopata's work was displayed before the Verkhovna Rada (Ukrainian parliament) committees on economic reform and culture, being approved by Chairman of the Verkhovna Rada Leonid Kravchuk.

Lopata's designs were sent to Canada in 1992 to be printed by the Canadian Bank Note Company. Coinage was produced by the government of Italy, as well as Luhansk Cartridge Works.

== Reform ==
According to Viktor Suslov, a participant in the reform, a month prior to Kuchma's "On Monetary Reform in Ukraine" decree, a commission on studying the feasibility of monetary reforms had been established, headed by Pavlo Lazarenko as Prime Minister of Ukraine and including economists Viktor Yushchenko (then head of the National Bank of Ukraine), Viktor Pynzenyk, Suslov, and Volodymyr Stelmakh.

On 25 August 1996, Kuchma signed the decree "On Monetary Reform in Ukraine", which formally established the hryvnia and subdivided it into 100 kopiyok. This was followed on 2 September 1996 by the National Bank of Ukraine introducing six banknotes for the hryvnia (numbering 1, 2, 5, 10, 20, 50, and 100), as well as six different coins for the kopiyka (numbering 1, 2, 5, 10, 25, and 50). Exchanges between the old karbovanets and the new hryvnia occurred at a rate of 100,000:1, and the former currency was completely removed from the economic supply by 16 September 1996. After that date, exchanging from karbovantsiv to hryvnias was only possible in banks until 1998, when the exchange process ended.

== Legacy ==
The reforms were successful in restoring confidence in the Ukrainian economy and reducing inflationary pressures; inflation dropped to 40% by the end of 1996 and further to 10% by 1997. Despite the damage to Ukraine's economy as an effect of the 1998 Russian financial crisis, declines in real GDP decreased year on year going into 1999.

The 1996 monetary reform also introduced Viktor Yushchenko to the national political scene, allowing him to ultimately become President of Ukraine following the 2004 Ukrainian presidential election and Orange Revolution. However, the process of denomination has been more recently attributed to Vadym Hetman, Yushchenko's predecessor, who has been popularly named as "Father of the Hryvnia" in recognition of his achievements.
