= Yaroslav Zheleznyak =

Ukrainian politician

- Ярослав Железняк
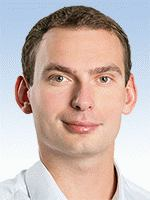
- Official portrait, 2019

People's Deputy of Ukraine
- Incumbent
- Assumed office 29 August 2019
- Constituency: Holos, No. 4

Personal details
- Born: 20 October 1989 (age 36) Mariupol, Ukrainian SSR, Soviet Union
- Party: Holos
- Education: Taras Shevchenko National University of Kyiv

Yaroslav Ivanovych Zheleznyak (Ukrainian: Ярослав Іванович Железняк; born 20 October 1989) is a Ukrainian economist and politician. From 2017 to 2019, he was an adviser to Prime Minister Volodymyr Groysman. In the 2019 Ukrainian parliamentary election he was elected as a People's Deputy of Ukraine of the 9th convocation from the Holos party.

== Early life ==
Zheleznyak was born on 20 October 1989 in Mariupol, Donetsk Oblast.

In 2009, he studied at the Institute of Law of the Verkhovna Rada of Ukraine. In 2013, he graduated from the Institute of International Relations at Taras Shevchenko National University of Kyiv with a master's degree in International Business.

From 2010 to 2014, he worked as a Senior Government Affairs Advisor at the Russian company Kesarev Consulting. Later on in 2024, due to this position he was accused of being an operative of the FSB, with political scientist Marian Oshchanovsky writing that Kesarev was owned by FSB officers. From 2014 to 2015, he served as a Government Affairs Advisor at Anheuser-Busch, a brewing company.

He teaches at the Kyiv School of Economics, heads the NGO Agency for Innovative Democracy, and is a co-founder of the PolitEyes project.

== Politics ==
In the VIII convocation of the Verkhovna Rada, he first served as an assistant-consultant to the people's deputy Viktoria Ptashnyk (who was then part of Self Reliance. Previous to this, in the VI convocation which ran from 2007 to 2012, he served as a consultant to the people's deputy Oleksiy Plotnikov (who was then part of the Party of Regions).

He took on a formal position in 2015 when he became an adviser on government and parliamentary relations to the then Minister of Economic Development, Aivaras Abromavičius. A year later, he started working for the advisory body, Strategic Advisory Group to Support Reforms in Ukraine, and then in 2017 as an adviser to then Prime Minister Volodymyr Groysman on parliamentary relations. In June 2019, Holos announced the list of candidates for the party ahead of the 2019 Ukrainian parliamentary election, which he was included on as candidate no. 4. He won a seat in the Rada during those elections, and was officially sworn in on 29 August 2019 in the 9th convocation. As a people's deputy, he had been on numerous groups for international relations with countries such as Australia, the United Kingdom, and Poland. On 28 December 2020 he was elected chairman of the parliamentary faction of Holos to replace Serhiy Rakhmanin.

During the negotiations for the Ukraine–United States Mineral Resources Agreement in the midst of the Russia-Ukraine War, he acted as a whistle-blower as he received a leaked draft and exposed its key provisions prior to its signing because he called them favourable to the United States. He stated it gave the U.S. disproportionate control over the supervisory board, and offered no security guarantees.

== Personal life ==
He currently lives in Kyiv. In 2015, he married Antoaneta Yurievna Zheleznyak (née Gorobets), whom he remained married to until 2020. During this time, they lived with Gorobets' father, Yuri. After his divorce to Gorobets, he married the daughter of Volodymyr Koval, Olha Koval, who is also a people's deputy but for the ruling party of Servant of the People.

According to his financial declosure in 2020, in addition to his deputy salary he received another 621,000 UAH of income from the disposal of movable property and owns multiple houses in Kyiv and Bila Tserkva.
