= Tetiana Andrianova =

Ukrainian lawyer

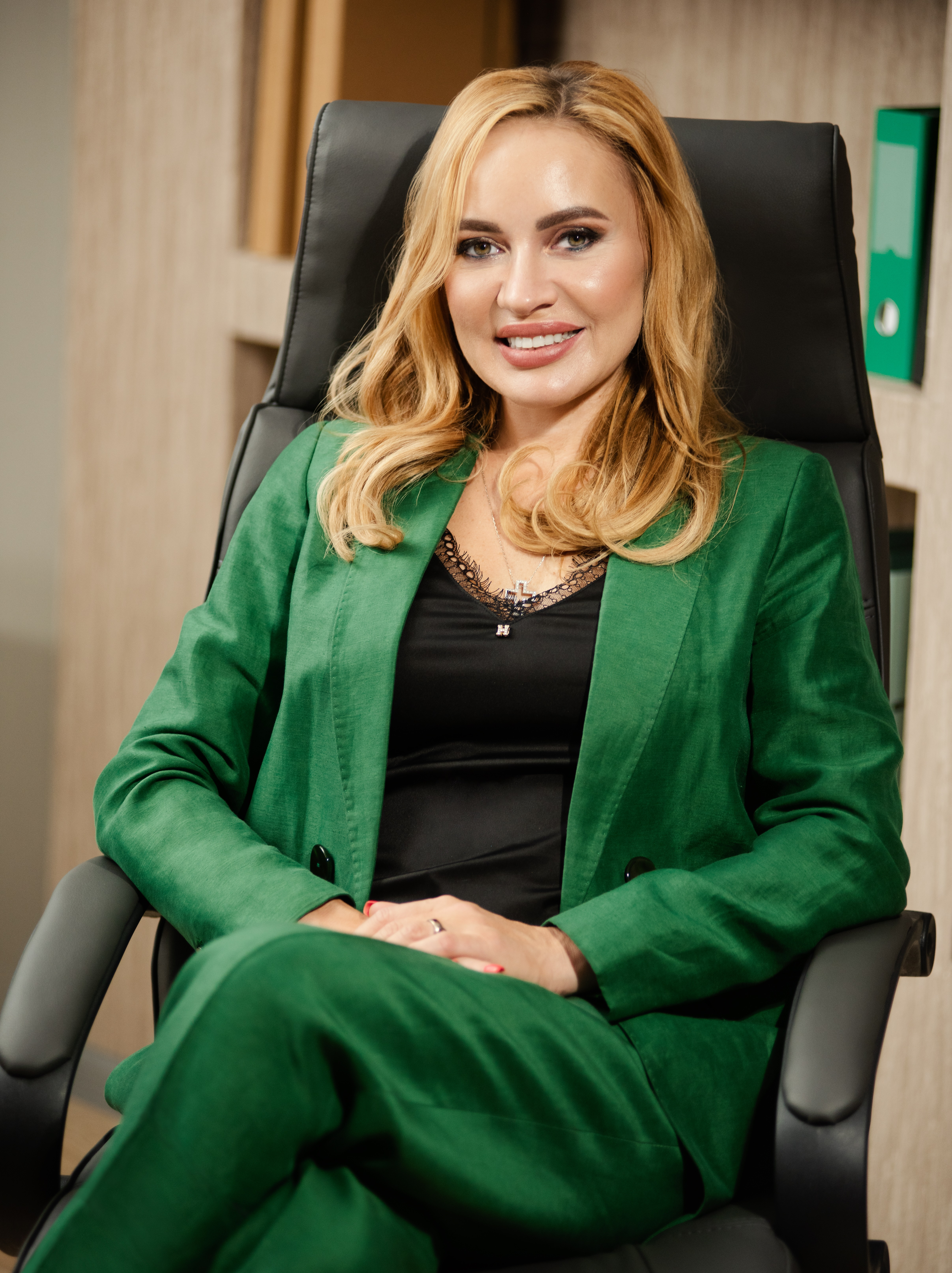
- Born: October 13, 1978 (age 47); Ukraine
- Education: Kyiv National Economic University (Law, 2000); International Institute of Management (MBA, 2014); Carnegie Mellon University (internship, 2014)
- Occupations: Businesswoman, Lawyer
- Known for: Corporate governance, M&A, privatization, restructuring
- Title: CEO of Nota Group and Octava Capital

Tetiana Andrianova (born October 13, 1978) is a Ukrainian businesswoman and lawyer, specializing in corporate governance, mergers and acquisitions, state enterprises privatization and restructuring. She is Chair of the Gender Policy Committee of the Ukrainian National Bar Association, a board member of the Association of Corporate Security Professionals of Ukraine, the national coordinator of the Women in Security Council (Ukraine chapter), CEO of Nota Group and Octava Capital, head of the corporate security committee of the Octava Group, and owner of the Andrianova Law Office.

== Education ==
In 2000, Andrianova graduated from Kyiv National Economic University named after Vadym Hetman with a degree in Law.

In 2014, she earned an MBA from the International Institute of Management and completed a professional internship at Carnegie Mellon University in Pennsylvania, USA.

== Career ==
In 2001, Andrianova began her professional journey at JSC "Information Computer Systems" as a legal assistant.

In 2004, she obtained her attorney license.

Since 2016, she has served as CEO of Nota Group, and since 2020, as CEO of Octava Capital. In 2026, she was included in the list of top 10 CEOs of Modern Ukraine.

== Public engagement ==
Since 2017, Andrianova has been a board member of the Association of Corporate Security Professionals of Ukraine (ACSPU), an organization focused on establishing, structuring, and developing Ukraine's corporate security market, including legislative support and best practice implementation.

Since 2018, she has been the coordinator of Women in Security under ASIS Ukraine, promoting international security standards and best practices in Ukraine. She also lectures in the ACSPU's "Corporate Security Manager" course and leads the Legal Departments Committee within the association.

Since 2021, she has chaired the Gender Policy Committee of the Ukrainian National Bar Association.

In 2022, she co-founded the "Take Back Yours" project — a volunteer platform supporting those who lost their homes due to Russian military aggression. She is also involved in the volunteer legal initiative “Lawyers for the Armed Forces of Ukraine.”

== Political and academic activity ==
Between 2011 and 2012, Andrianova was a member of the working group developing legislative packages aimed at advancing the IT industry in Ukraine.
