= Olena Derevianko =

Ukrainian academic, publicist and journalist

- Олена Дерев'янко
- Born: August 14, 1974 (age 52); Kyiv, Ukraine
- Education: Vadym Hetman Kyiv National Economic University
- Occupation: Academic

Olena Derevianko (Ukrainian: Олена Дерев'янко; born 1 August 1974) is a Ukrainian academic, Professor of Social Communications in the National University of Kharkiv and National University of Food Technologies, publicist and journalist. She is a co-founder of Ukrainian agency PR-service.

== Biography ==
Olena Derevianko was born in Kyiv to a family of university teachers in 1974; Olena's grandmother taught Strength of Materials and her mother taught economics. In 1996, she graduated with honour from the Faculty of Economics of the Kyiv National Economic University. In 2018, Derevianko became a professor of the National University of Food Technologies. During 1997–1998, she was awarded as a laureate of a Cabinet of Ministers of Ukraine scholarship for postgraduate studies. In 2000, she got a PhD in economics, defended the Thesis on The Enterprise Management Strategy Formation. In 2016, she defended the thesis for Doctor of Sciences in Economics, and offered the original model of reputation management. She got a PhD in Political Economy in Zurich (Switzerland) in 2019. Since 2020, Derevianko has been visiting professor of Social Communications in the National University of Kharkiv, Ukraine.

== Career ==
Olena Derevianko began her career working in Business, Companion, Business News and other Ukrainian business journals. Since 2003, she has been working in PR, became a co-founder and is a managing partner of PR-Service Agency. Since 2007, Olena Derevianko has been the coordinator of PR of DCH group and became the DCH Vice President. She became the vice-president of the All-Ukrainian Public Organization ‘Ukrainian League for Public Relations’ in 2007. Since 2017, Olena Derevianko has been a leader of the independent think tank "Power Matters".

Since 2018, she has been the Chairman of the Anti-Crisis Communications Committee of the Association of Corporate Security Professionals of Ukraine. In 2018, she became a member of the European Economic Senate. In 2019, Olena Derevianko became the first representative of Eastern European countries in the Belgian Centre for European Democracy Studies team.

In 2019, Derevianko published 2 books of the essays "Essays on second thoughts. Essays on power, money and people in an epoch of post-truth".

Derevianko published her scientific monograph "Reputation Management in Business: Theory, Methodology and Country Features" in Ukrainian (2016), Russian (2018), and English (2019).

In 2021, Derevyanko was included in the SHINE 2021 ranking of the Best Businesswomen of Ukraine by Investory News and won the Women's Leadership nomination at the SHE Congress.

== Key ideas ==
Olena Derevianko considers that the corporate reputation is the confidence of the stakeholders, meaning their willingness to economically support the corporate development (buying products, investing, supporting partnerships, creating and spreading positive information, etc.). System of functions of the corporate reputation management including the informative function, knowledge update function, risk reduction function, anti-crisis function, function of economic results evaluation, social positioning function, function of protecting against price competition, value generation function.

Theoretical and methodological foundations of the corporate reputation management are based on the concept of antifragility, allowing one to intensify cooperation with key stakeholders and monitor the effectiveness of management measures to ensure that the long-standing reputation can maintain itself without active management measures. The latter is a key criterion for the efficiency of the target model of the corporate reputation management.

== Bibliography ==
=== Journal articles ===
1. Derevianko, O. (2019). Reputation stability vs anti-crisis sustainability: Under what circumstances will innovations, media activities and CSR be in higher demand? Oeconomia Copernicana, 10(3), 511–536. doi:10.24136/oc.2019.025
2. Derevianko, O. (2019). Corporate reputation management: theory and applied rating approach. Innovative entrepreneurship: approach to facing relevant socio-humanitarian and technological challenges collective monograph. I. M. Riepina, V. V. Lavrenenko, L. A. Petrenko et al. Lviv-Toruń : Liha-Pres, 118–141.
3. Derevianko, O. (2019). Influence of reputation ratings on the perception of companies by stakeholders [in Ukrainian] Innovative entrepreneurship: state and prospects of development. Scientific-Practical Conf., March 29–30 Kyiv: KNEU, 2019. р.15–18.
4. Derevianko, O. (2018). Stakeholder engagement to replace traditional activities in Reputation Management System: Insights from Ukrainian food processing companies. Problems and Perspectives in Management, 16(4), 314–330. doi:10.21511/ppm.16(4).2018.26
5. Derevianko, O. (2017) Study of stability and antifragility of reputation in view of multi-vector character of reputation management of enterprises. EUREKA: Social and Humanities, No. 5, 48–56
6. Derevianko, O. (2015) Organizational profiles of the system of reputation management of the food industry enterprises of Ukraine. In Ukrainian Business Inform, Volume 1, 363–372
7. Derevianko, O. (2014). Identification of a company's reputation management model. Economic Annals-XXI. Volume 7–8, 92–94.
8. Derevianko, O. (2014) System of Enterprise Reputation Management. Business Inform. Volume 3, 381–386.
9. Derevianko, O. (2014) Management aspects of the company's reputation antifragility in Ukrainian. Scientific notes, Kyiv National Economic University named after Vadim Hetman. Issue 16, 74–80.
10. Derevianko, O. (2013) Building stakeholders’ trust through key directions of company's reputation management. Economic Annals-XXI. Volume 9–10, 50–52.

=== Books ===
1. Деревянко, Е. Управление репутацией в бизнесе: теория, методология, инструментарий, страновые особенности. (Russian Edition) LAP LAMBERT Academic Publishing, 2018. – 336 p.
2. Derevianko Olena. Reputation Management in Business: Theory, Methodology, and Country Features. (English edition) Brussels: European World Publishing, 2019. 287 p.
3. Деревянко, Е. Опыты ясномыслия : эссе о власти, деньгах и людях эпохи постправды. Часть 1 (Russian Edition) — Киев : Саммит-книга, 2019. — 384 с. : ил.
4. Деревянко, Е. Опыты ясномыслия : эссе о власти, деньгах и людях эпохи постправды. Часть 2 (Russian Edition) – Киев : Саммит-книга, 2019. — 352 с. : ил
