= Olga Rudnieva =

Ukrainian charity administrator

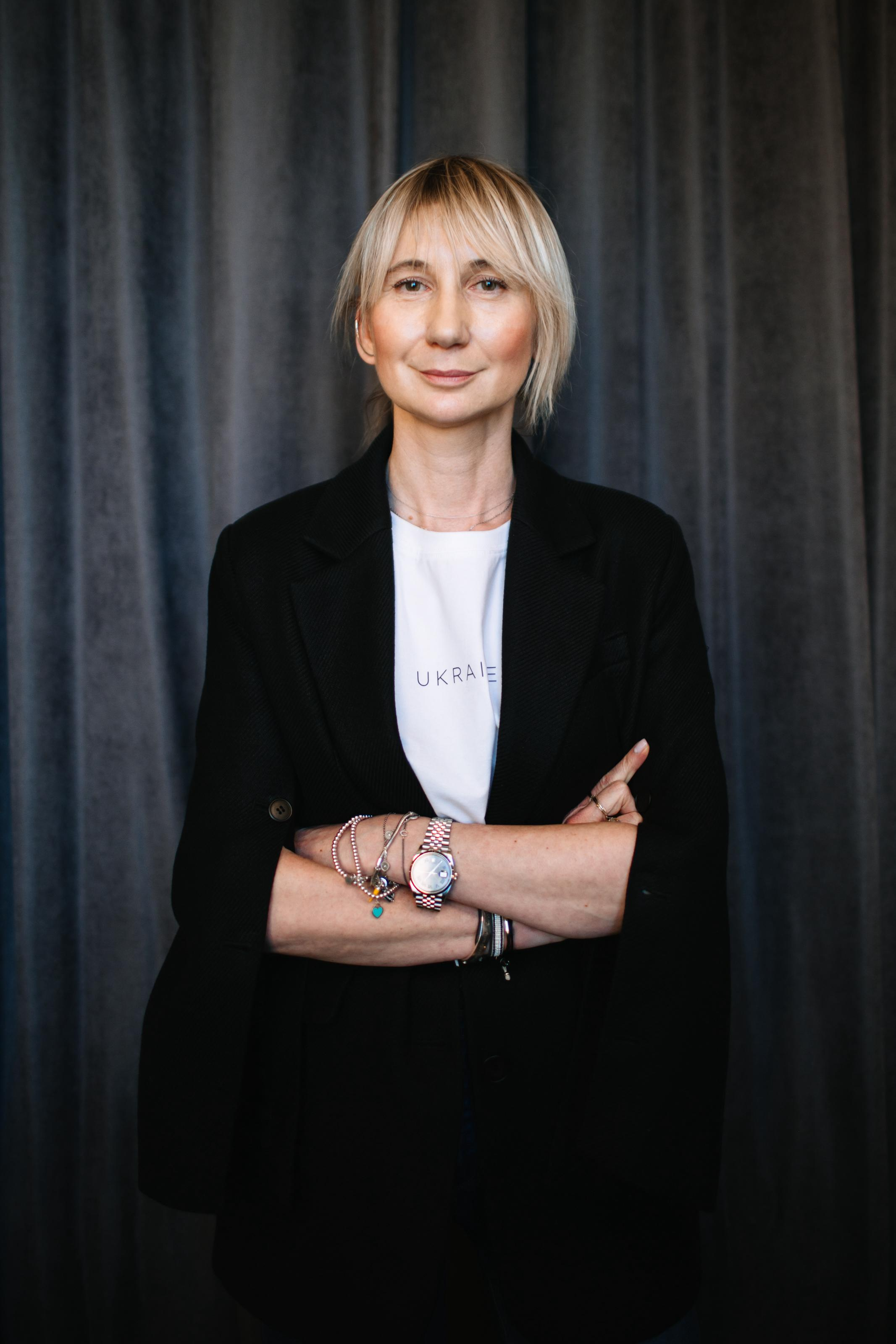
- Olga Rudnieva in 2024
- Born: c. 1977; Donetsk, Ukraine
- Education: Kyiv National Economic University; Taras Shevchenko National University of Kyiv
- Known for: Co-Founder and CEO of Superhumans Center.; Listed in BBC's 100 Women (2024).

Olga Rudnieva (born 1977, Donetsk) is the co-founder and CEO of the Superhumans Center in Ukraine which has treated over 1,000 wounded amputees from the Russia-Ukraine conflict in its first two years.

In December 2024, she was named in BBC's 100 women for her work inspiring others.

== Biography ==
Rudnieva was a director of the Olena Pinchuk Foundation, which worked to combat HIV/AIDS in Ukraine. After the beginning of the Russian invasion, she was abroad and coordinated a humanitarian aid hub in Poland. She subsequently returned to Ukraine and became involved in the Superhumans Center, a project founded by Andrii Stavnitser.

"Some people have double, triple, quadruple amputations. All these people will need prosthetics, or some will use wheelchairs...With more than one million people on the front line... Ukraine will become "the country of people with disabilities".

We want to normalise disability. OK, that's how the country is going to look... Most of the people here at the centre shouldn't be alive. The fact that they are is a miracle in itself... We truly believe that you can be empowered by trauma. The trauma can ruin you or it can build your superpower"

- Olga Rudnieva.

For this, Superhumans Team raised funds to help set up the Superhumans Center in Lviv - to help the wounded with prosthetic limbs and provide them with all the rehabilitation treatment they would need. The centre opened in April 2023 and is described as "a clinic for psychological assistance, prosthetics, reconstructive surgery and rehabilitation for people affected by the war".

In its first two years, the centre has treated over 1,000 patients and acts as supplemental medical service to help Ukraine's overwhelmed medical centres and hospitals along the 3,200km of front line. Those treated include both military and civilian, adults and children. Many of the injuries are from landmines and explosives so the first step for a patient at the centre is a meeting with a psychologist. Infection control is also a challenge with patients often arriving with a number of infections after being in up to 6-7 different hospitals during their evacuation. "There are many challenges, but none are insoluble", says Rudnieva.

The second Superhumans Center opened in Dnipro, and a third center is planned in Odesa for 2026.

Rudnieva's philosophy that injuries can be empowering, has found many celebrity supporters including adventurer Bear Grylls, Richard Branson, singer Sting and actress Trudie Styler.

Resilience is to wake up morning after morning to air sirens and keep fighting for your country. It’s rediscovering your ‘what for?’ instead of being stuck at ‘why me?’ It’s finding ways to do more, having less every day.

— Olga Rudnieva, BBC News
