= Andrey Motovilovets =

Ukrainian politician and entrepreneur

Andriy Motovilovets Андрій Мотовиловець
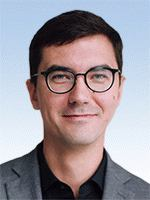

People's Deputy of Ukraine
- Incumbent
- Assumed office 29 August 2019

Vice chief head of Servant of the People party fraction in the Verkhovna Rada
- Incumbent
- Assumed office 1 November 2021
- Preceded by: Oleksandr Kornienko

Personal details
- Born: Andriy Viktorovych Motovilovets; 29 April 1982 (age 44) Kyiv, Ukrainian SSR
- Party: Servant of the People
- Education: Kyiv National Economic University
- Occupation: politician

Andriy Viktorovych Motovilovets (Ukrainian: Андрій Вікторович Мотовиловец; born 29 April 1982, Kyiv) is a Ukrainian politician, national deputy (IX convocation) of the Verkhovna Rada of Ukraine. Vice chief head of Sluha Narodu party fraction in the Verkhovna Rada of Ukraine since 1 November 2021.

== Biography ==
Motovilovets graduated from the Economic department of the Kyiv National Economic University.

In 2014, Motovilovets was appointed Analyst Expert on state procurements at the Ministry of Infrastructure of Ukraine, acting as assistant to Vice Chief Minister Vladimir Shulmeister, and advisor to Minister Andriy Pyvovarsky. Motovilovets also worked on the roll-out of the Prozorro public procurements system to the Department of Infrastructure.

From 2016 until 2019 was the operation officer of state enterprise Prozorro Sales.

In 2019, Motovilovets was elected to the 9th Ukrainian Verkhovna Rada (Ukrainian parliament), under the Servant of the People party. He is a Member of the Parliamentary Committee on Finance, Tax and Customs Policy.

On 14 March 2021, he headed the Kyiv oblast party branch of Sluha Narodu.

On 1 November 2021, he was appointed Vice Chief of the head of the Sluha Narodu party fraction in the Verkhovna Rada of Ukraine. According to Head of the fraction Davyd Arakhamia, even before his appointment, Motovilovets had actually already been executing vice chief functions.

=== Prozorro.Sales ===
Before 2019, when Motovilovets was elected national deputy of the Verkhovna Rada, Prozorro. Sales had earned more than 17.5 billion hryvna for the state. Such results made the implementation of the ProZorro Procurement system the most efficient economic reform in Ukraine.

=== Coronavirus ===
Since 17 March 2021, Motovilovets has been acting as one of the conveners organizing the activities of the Anti-Crisis Headquarters set up by the Office of the President of Ukraine to take measures against the Coronavirus.

Motovilovets ensured communication between Ukrainian businessmen, who provided funds to purchase medical equipment, foreign suppliers and Ukrainian state authorities. He accompanied the first air flight carrying masks, lung ventilation equipment and medical tests from China to Ukraine, organized by the Office of the President of Ukraine. The cargo, particularly the PCR tests, were thereafter sent to hospitals and laboratories in all regions of Ukraine.

== Parliamentary activity ==
Motovilovets has been one of the most active IX convocation deputies of the Verkhovna Rada. As of October 2021, he participated in 227 plenary sessions out of 232 that were held. As a person having the right of legislative initiative, Deputy Motovilovets has drafted 147 legislative proposals for consideration in the Parliament. Twenty three of them were passed and became laws.

As a member of the Verkhovna Rada Committee on Finance, Tax and Customs policy, Motovilovets took part in the formation of the law On state regulating of activities organizing and conducting gambling games. He supported passing the law, believing that the latter would “provide transparent rules for business and gamblers” and would as well fill the state budget. Throughout the first year of the law on purchasing licenses being in force, the state budget was filled by a sum surpassing 1 billion hryvna.
