= Volodymyr Matvienko =

Ukrainian economist and politician (born 1938)

Hero of Ukraine Volodymyr Matvienko
- Володимир Матвієнко
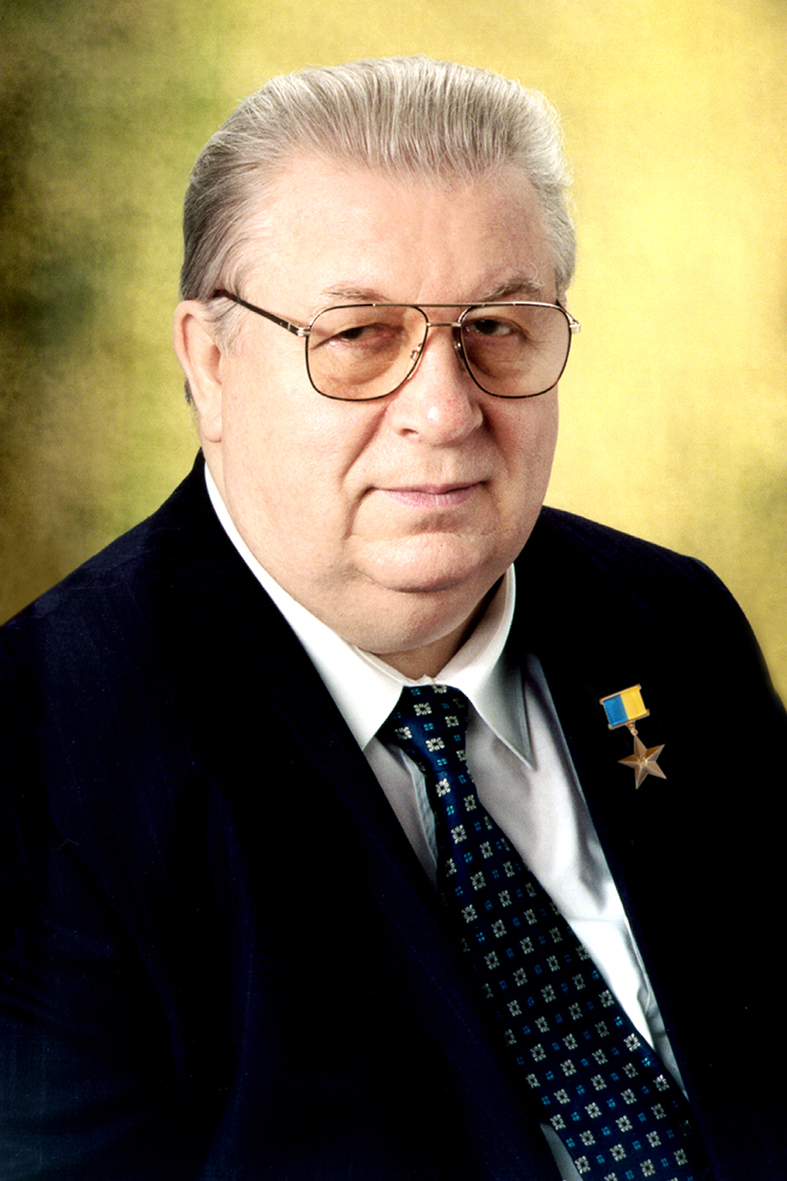
- Matvienko in 2011

1st Chairman of the National Bank of Ukraine
- In office August 1991 – March 1992
- Preceded by: Position established
- Succeeded by: Vadym Hetman

Personal details
- Born: 5 January 1938 (age 88) Bilka, Ukrainian SSR, Soviet Union (now Ukraine)
- Spouse: Halyna Pylypivna
- Children: 2, including Pavlo
- Education: Kyiv National Economic University
- Occupation: Economist; banker; entrepreneur; author; politician
- Awards: Hero of Ukraine
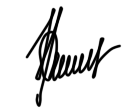
- Signature
- Website: v-matvienko.com.ua

Volodymyr Pavlovych Matvienko (Ukrainian: Володимир Павлович Матвієнко; born 5 January 1938) is a Ukrainian poet-songwriter, economist and politician who is a recipient of both the Hero of Ukraine and Order of Prince Yaroslav the Wise. Additionally, he was the first chairman of the National Bank of Ukraine (NBU) from 1991 to 1992.

== Early life and education ==
Born on 5 January 1938, in the Ukrainian village of Bilka. Matvienko completed his postgraduate studies at the Kyiv Institute of National Economy in 1967 after earning a degree in finance and credit from the Kyiv Financial and Economic Institute in 1959. He was given the academic title of professor in 1992. He was given the title of professor of the department of banking in 1992 by the Kyiv Institute of National Economy.

== Career ==
His career journey began in July 1959 when he started as a credit inspector at the Zhdaniv branch of the Budbank of the USSR in the Donetsk Oblast. Progressing steadily, he became the manager of the Artemivske branch in 1964, later assuming roles such as deputy manager of the Donetsk regional office, manager of the Dnipropetrovsk regional office, and eventually deputy manager of the Ukrainian SSR office of the Budbank of the USSR, where he served from 1982 to 1987.

Transitioning to higher positions, he took on the role of chairman of the board of the Ukrainian Republic Bank of Prombudbank of the USSR from 1987 to 1991. In 1991, Matvienko's career trajectory shifted significantly when he was appointed chairman of the board of the National Bank of Ukraine (NBU). Notably, he implemented innovative measures such as reusable coupons to counteract inflation in the early 1990s, effectively averting a severe cash crisis in Ukraine.

On 6 June 1991, Matvienko was elected as the first chairman of the NBU board by deputies with almost unanimous consent. He noted that the national bank operated under harsh, conflicting circumstances, much like the fledgling state of Ukraine. Nonetheless, the NBU completed many other responsibilities associated with the establishment of the state's central bank, including the formation of a domestic monetary system, a system of credit control, a mechanism for supporting international economic activity, and monetary settlements.

In September 1991, the Government Courier newspaper published an article in which Matvienko discussed the state of affairs at the moment, pointing out that the intricacy of the money issue extends beyond simple manufacturing. Should they launch their own currency, certain legal acts will need to be developed and enacted. Establish the notion of monetary reform, the pricing structure, and the new monetary unit's exchange rate to foreign currencies.

Direct work was done on the hryvnia's creation at the same period. The hryvnia currency design was created by Ukrainian painters Vasyl Lopata and Boris Maksimov, and Matvienko authorized prototypes of the first bills. He signed large banknotes that Thomas de la Rue printed in London.

Maksimov's influence continued to shape the banking landscape as in 1992, the corporatization of Budbank led to the establishment of the Ukrainian Joint Stock Commercial Industrial and Investment Bank (Prominvestbank), with him as its principal shareholder. He would go on to establish the Kyiv Institute of Banking in 1997 and served as its permanent rector for 14 years.

Later in his life, Professor Matvienko holds honorary membership in the Ukrainian Academy of Architecture, Ukrainian Academy of Economic Cybernetics, Ukrainian Environmental Academy of Sciences, full membership in the Ukrainian Academy of Engineering Sciences, and academician status in the Academy of Economic Sciences.

== Books ==
Matvienko is a writer of many books on philosophy, banking, economics, poems and songs, including:

- State and Banks (1996)
- Autograph on the hryvnia (2000)
- Reflections of the banker (2002)
- Prominvestbank: Reproduction Strategy (2002)
- Desired and Real (2003)
- Philosophical and Economic Views (2003)
- From the point of view of the world (2020)
- I love my Ukraine (1997)
- On my native expanses (1999)
- Song of my star (2001)
- Souls of my excitement (2001)
- Oberem of memory (2001)
- Witty words (2000; 2005)
- My village (2004)

== Philanthropy ==
Matvienko is also a philanthropist who promotes education, art, and culture both domestically and overseas. As the chairman of the board of Prominvestbank, he was a prominent member of the public, the bank provided charity support to war veterans, disabled individuals, and underprivileged children from 1992 to 2008. He provided financial assistance to several medical research centres. He contributed to the restoration of the Kyiv Pechersk Lavra, St. Michael's Golden-Domed Monastery and many other.

With particular focus on bringing his hometown of Bilka back to life, Matvienko has been in charge of the construction of a number of infrastructure, such as a House of Culture that houses the village's heritage museum, a clinic, a school named after him, housing complexes, a Youth Stage complex, a coffeehouse, and cottages. He also led the telephoneization program in Korosten and the neighboring villages in the Korosten Raion. The Maidan Volodymyr Pavlovich Matvienko was the name given to the village's square in 2012 by the council of Bilka.

== Personal life ==
Matvienko is the son of Pavlo Oleksiyovych and Lukia Levkivna. He is married to Halyna Pylypivna (born 1941); and together they have a daughter Irina (born 1961) and a son Pavlo (born 1973), who became an economist and head of the All-Ukrainian Union "Democrats".

Fokus magazine ranked Matvienko as the 21st richest Ukrainian in February 2008; the publication estimated his net worth at $1.015 billion in 2023, pointing out that it was $995 million a year before. After a few months, he was ranked 20th out of all domestic wealthy persons by Korrespondent. The magazine said that he and his son Pavlo run the National Credit Bank in alongside Prominvestbank. The magazine states that the chairman of the board's total assets were $1.43 billion; during the year, these assets did not rise but rather fell by $520 million.

== Awards and recognitions ==
The minor planet was named 6622 Matvienko, according to the official certificate of the Crimean Astrophysical Observatory. One of the first banknotes of independent Ukraine has his signature. President Leonid Kuchma awarded him the title of Hero of Ukraine Order of the State in 2004, in recognition of his exceptional personal contributions to Ukraine in the development of the banking system, as well as several years of selfless effort and public service.

He has received awards and recognitions such as:

- Hero of Ukraine Order of the State (20 October 2004)
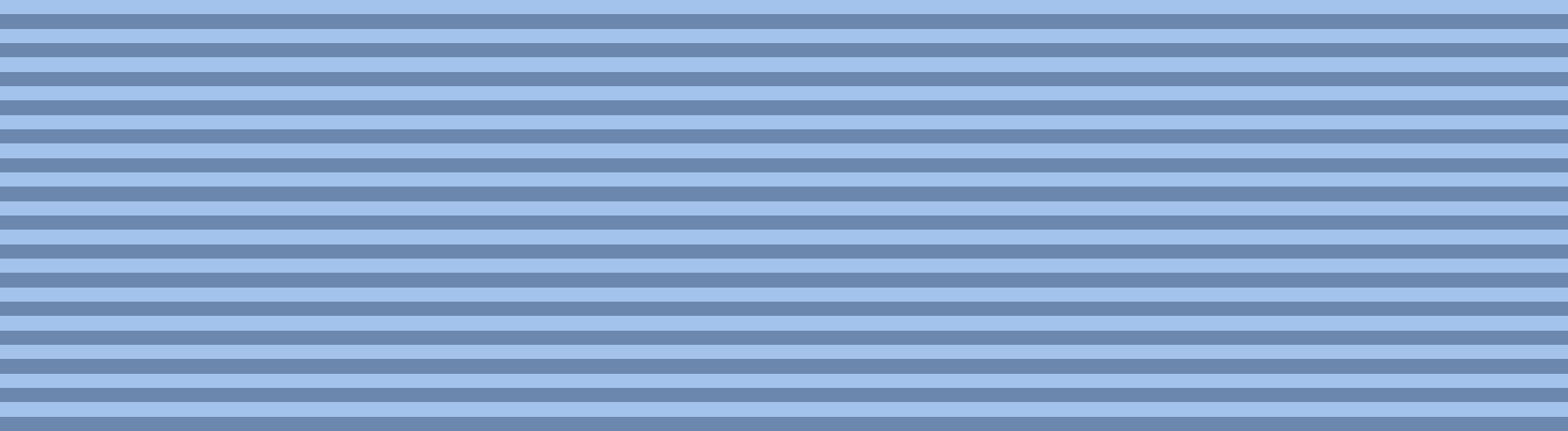
- Order of Prince Yaroslav the Wise Fourth Class (30 August 2002)
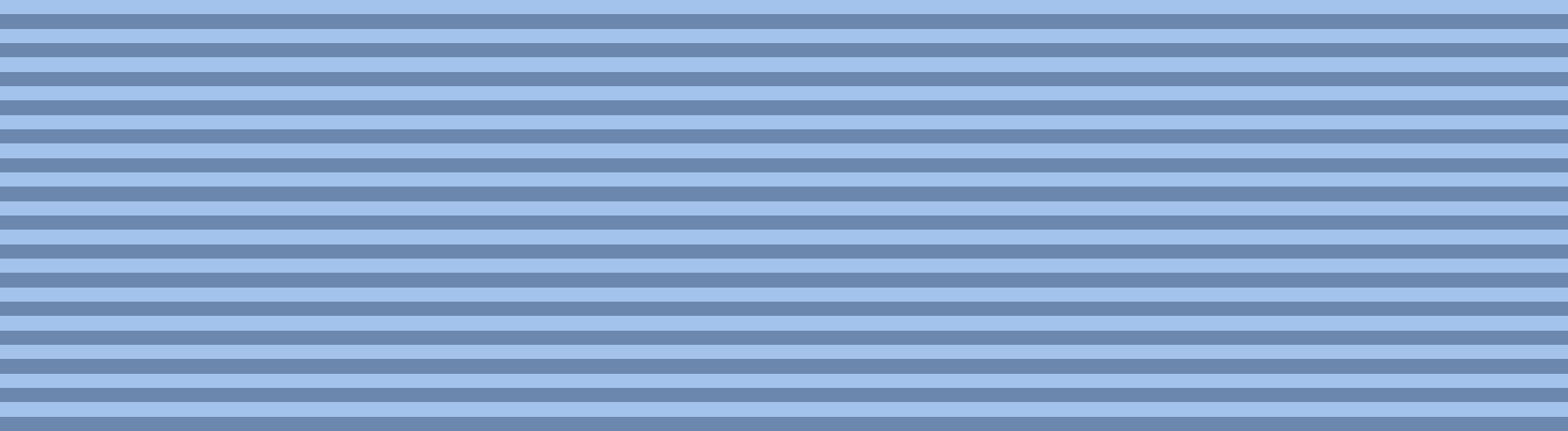
- Order of Prince Yaroslav the Wise Fifth Class (25 December 1997)
- Honorary Award of the President of Ukraine (22 August 1996)
- Order of Friendship of Peoples (1986)
- Jubilee Medal "In Commemoration of the 100th Anniversary of the Birth of Vladimir Ilyich Lenin" (1970)
- Medal "In Commemoration of the 1500th Anniversary of Kiev" (1982)
- Honored Art Worker of Ukraine (21 August 1999)
- Honorary Award of the Ministry of Culture and Arts of Ukraine (2004)
- Diploma of the Verkhovna Rada of Ukraine (2003)
- Diploma of the Cabinet of Ministers of Ukraine (July 2004)
- Diploma of the Presidium of the Verkhovna Rada of the Ukrainian SSR (1988)
- International Biographical Centre Man of the Year 1998–1999
- Honorary Professor of the International University Vienna
- Honorary Member of the Board of Directors of the American Biographical Institute

Government offices
Preceded by Position established	Chairman of the National Bank of Ukraine; 1991–1992	Succeeded by Vadym Hetman
