= Yuriy Kosiuk =

Ukrainian oligarch

- Юрій Косюк
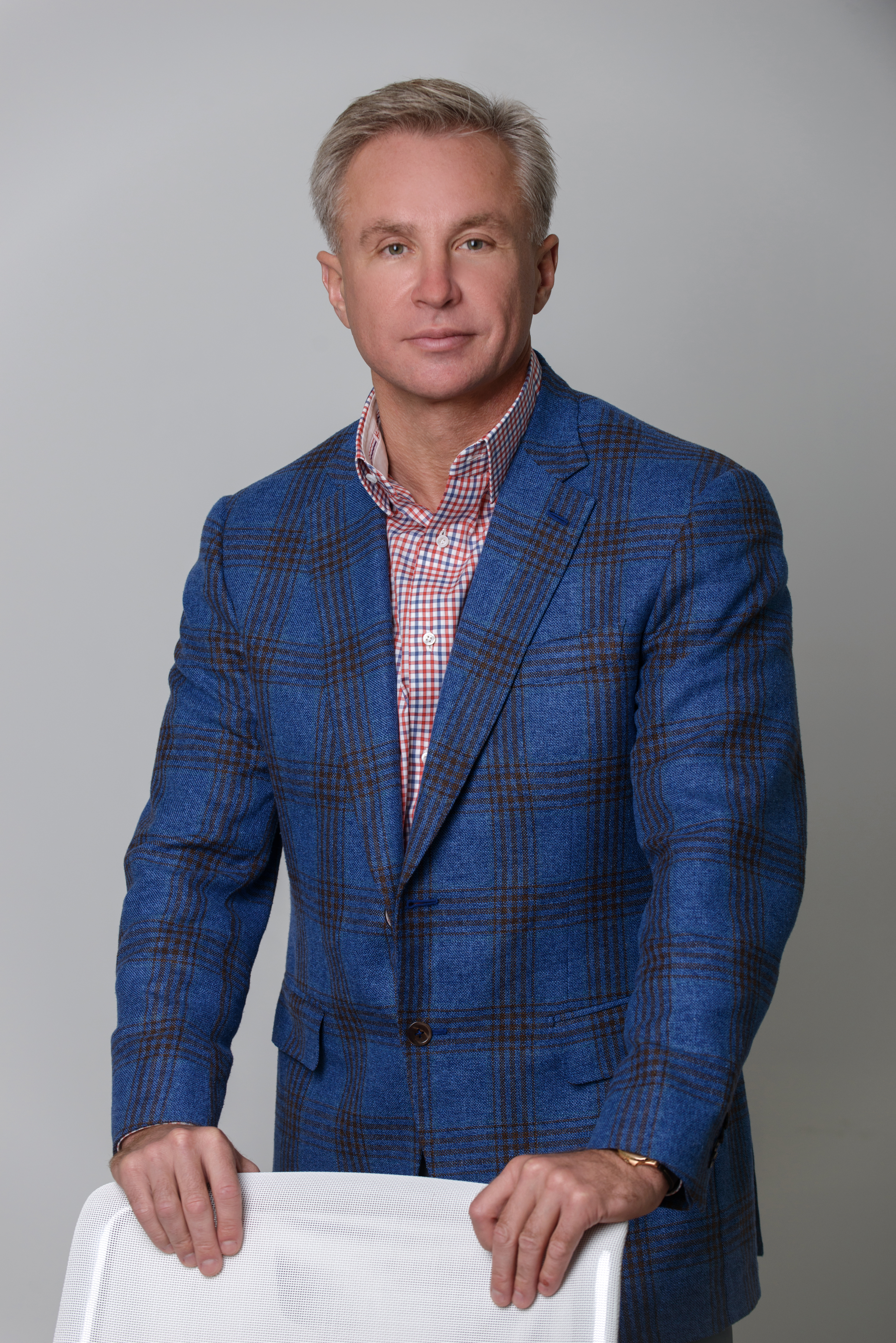
- Kosiuk in 2016
- Born: 1968 or 1969 (age 57–58)
- Citizenship: Ukrainian
- Education: Kyiv Food Industry Institute
- Occupations: CEO, MHP
- Spouse: Married
- Children: 1

Yuriy Anatoliyovych Kosiuk (Ukrainian: Юрій Анатолійович Косюк; born 27 May 1968) is a Ukrainian billionaire, and CEO agricultural company MHP.

== Early life ==
Kosiuk was born in Katerynopil, Cherkasy oblast. His mother, Halyna Yukhymivna Kosiuk, still lives there. His father, Anatolii Kosiuk, is buried there. He finished high school with honors (gold medal). Winner of All-Ukrainian Student's Olympiad on Chemistry.

In 1985, he entered Kyiv Technological Institute of Food Industry. In 1992, Kosiuk graduated in meat and milk production process engineering from the Kyiv Food Industry Institute under the specialty "Technology of meat and meat products". In 1989, as a 4th year student, he attended training for brokers.

== Career ==
In 1991, Kosyuk became a broker at Kyiv Commodity Exchange. In the following year — one of the founders of JV "LKB". The company was engaged in import of metal, grain, gas. He invested his first earned $100,000 in his own business — a meat processing workshop in Cherkasy oblast. The company quickly went bankrupt, however, and had to be sold almost for nothing. It was Yuriy Kosyuk's first failure in business. In 1995, he became the President of CJSC Scientific-Technical Business Centre for Food Industry. In 1998, he founded and headed CJSC Myronivsky Hliboproduct. In 2002, the trademark "Nasha Ryaba" entered the market.

In July 2014, he resigned from the post of the Chairman of the Board of MHP due to the appointment to the post of first Deputy Head of the Presidential Administration of Ukraine.

On the appointment of Kosyuk, the President of Ukraine Petro Poroshenko announced on 2 July 2014 at a meeting with the leaders of Deputy factions and groups of the Verkhovna Rada of Ukraine. In this position, he was in charge of acquisition, technology, and logistics of security agencies. On 8 December 2014, the President Petro Poroshenko dismissed Yuriy Kosyuk from the post of the Deputy Head of the Presidential Administration by Decree No. 924. However, by Decree No. 925 of the same date, Kosyuk was appointed an Adviser to the President. Thereafter, he was newly elected the Chairman of the Board of MHP.

== Achievements ==
In 2008, Myronivsky Hliboproduct was the first Ukrainian agri-industrial enterprise that was listed on the London Stock Exchange.

During the crisis in 2008, the businessman managed to increase production capacity by 30%, the same growth was observed in 2009. In 2010, Yuriy Kosyuk, the major shareholder of MHP, sold approximately 10% of the shares of the company. At this time, about 65% of the company's shares were in his possession, the remaining 35% were in float on the main market of theLondon Stock Exchange. By 2011, the company's capitalization was about $2 billion.

== Ratings ==
In the ranking of the richest people of Ukraine, according to Forbes Ukraine, Kosyuk consistently falls within the top 10, and in 2015-2016 — within the top 5.

As of March 2016, Forbes estimated his net worth at US$1.12 billion. In April 2016 the magazine Focus estimated his wealth at $769 million.

== State awards ==
The title of Hero of Ukraine with presentation of State order (20 August 2008) — for outstanding personal merits before the Ukrainian state in the development of agricultural sector, implementation of modern highly efficient technologies in the production and processing of agricultural products.

== Family ==
Married. He and his wife Olena have a son Ivan (born in 2000).

Olena Kosyuk works in MHP. She is the Director of the Department of Technology, Quality and Safety of Food Products.

Ivan studied in Columbia University (NY, USA).
