= National University of Food Technologies =

Public university in Kyiv, Ukraine

- Національний університет харчових технологій
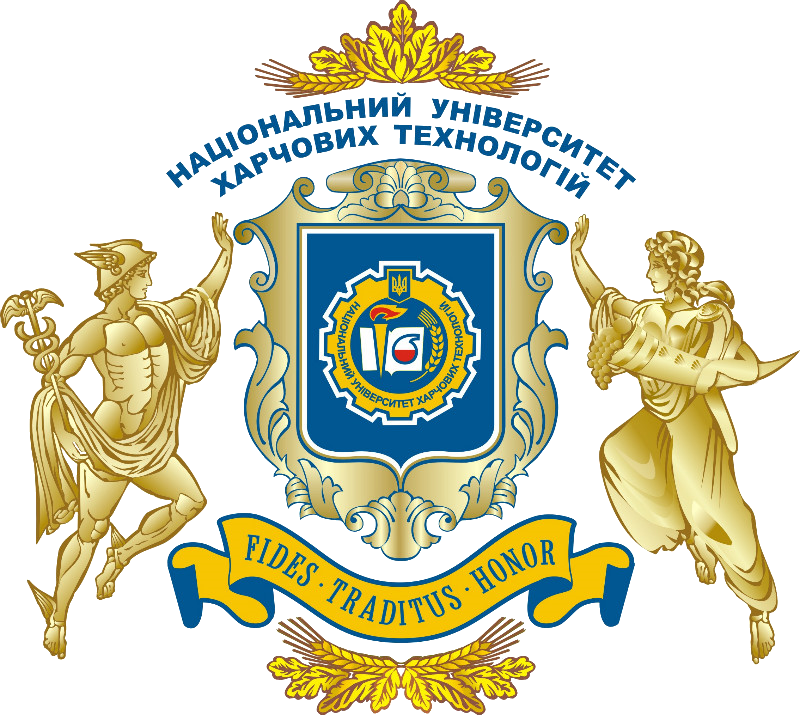
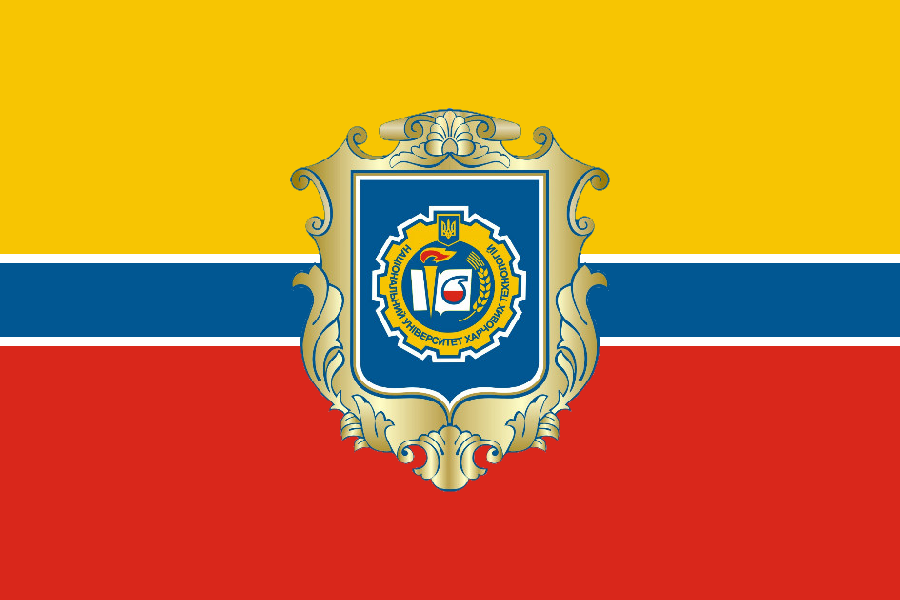
- Coat of arms and flag
- Motto: Fides, traditus, honor
- Motto in English: Faith, tradition, honor
- Type: Public
- Established: 1884
- Affiliations: Ministry of Education and Science of Ukraine
- Rector: Oleksandr Shevchenko
- Students: 27,517
- Location: City of Kyiv, Ukraine
- Website: www.nuft.edu.ua
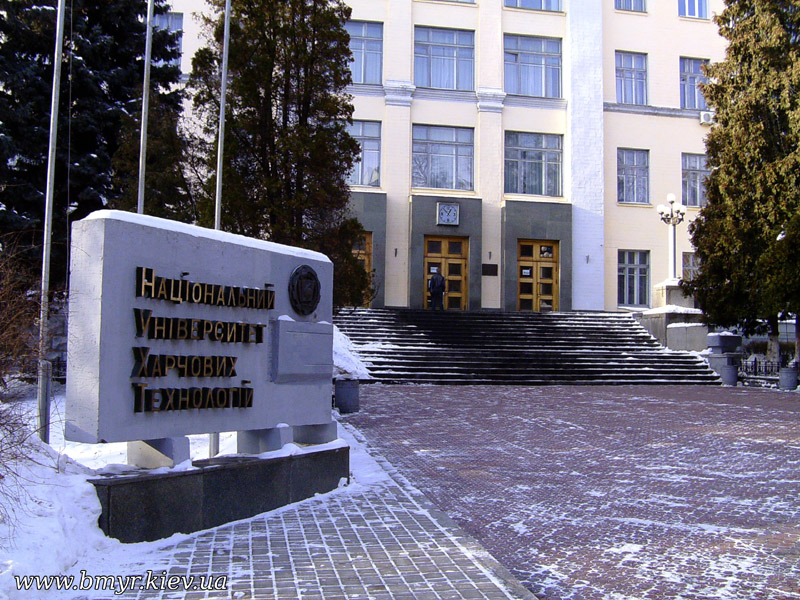

The National University of Food Technologies is a Ukrainian public university located in Kyiv.

== Campus ==
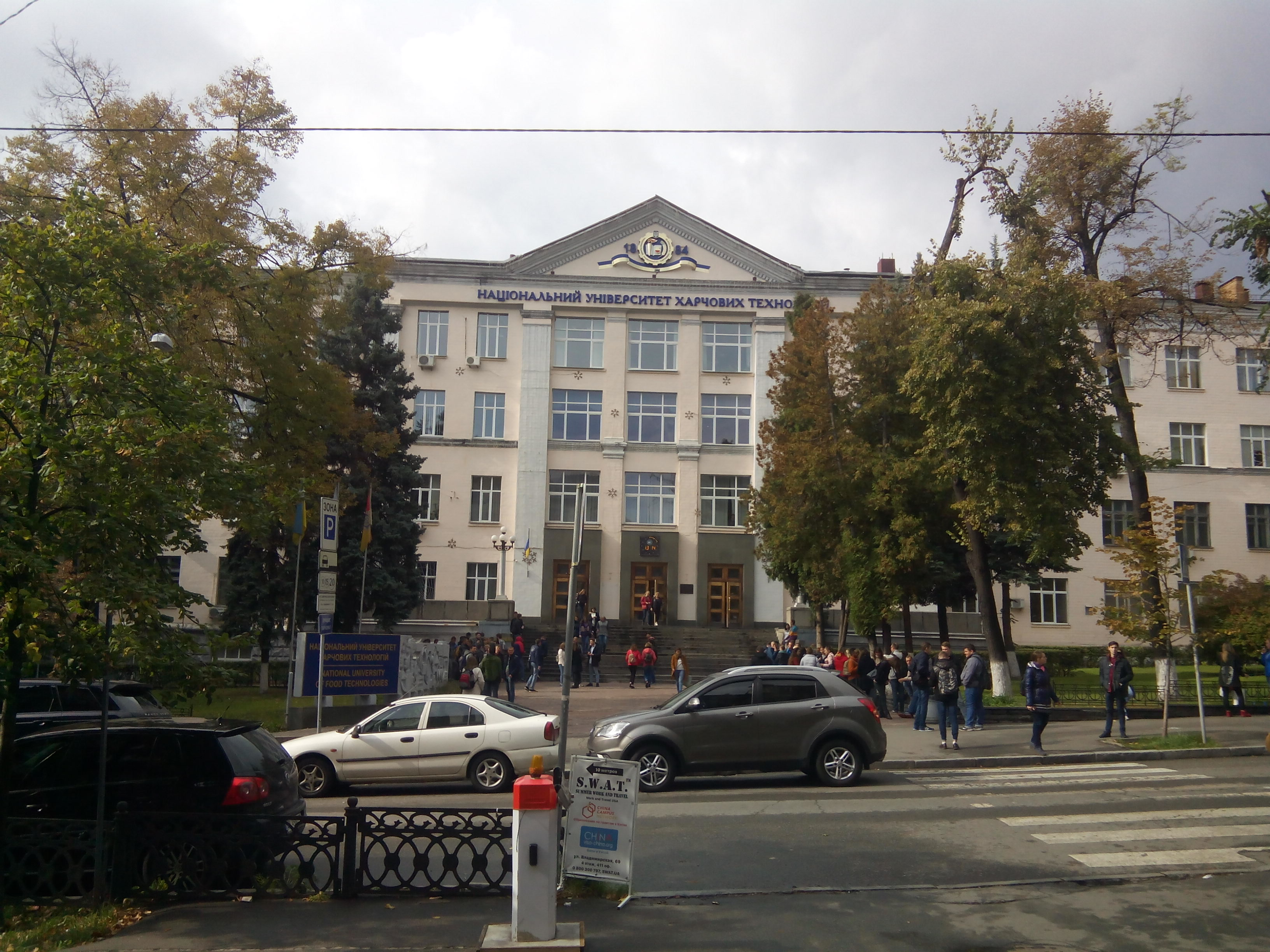
University main building.

The campus includes eight buildings. Building "A" hosts the University administration section, Assembly Hall, Academic Council Hall, Dean of Faculty, Departmental offices, Teaching offices, Classrooms and Laboratories. Building "B" hosts the University Entrance exam rooms, Department of Pre-University Education, Training rooms, Museum and classrooms. Buildings "C", "D", and "F" - each host departmental offices, teachers' offices, classrooms, and laboratories. Buildings "E" and "I" host University service centers: Human Resources, Accounting, Supplies Division, Chief Power Sources, the Department of Fire Safety and more.

On 2 September 2026 buildings of the university were damaged by Russian attack.

== Institutes and faculties ==
The National University of Food Technology consists of 21 faculties (including eight via correspondence or satellite campuses) which are located in the following regions of Ukraine: Kyiv, Vinnytsia, Lutsk, Kerch, Lviv, Poltava, Svaliava, Ivano-Frankivsk, Kamianets-Podilskyi, Simferopol, Smila, Sumy, and Odesa.

In Kyiv, there are the following programs of study:

- Production of Meat, Dairy, Perfume and Cosmetic Products;
- Bakery and Confection Industries;
- Biotechnology and Environmental Control;
- Mechanics, Engineering and Packing Equipment;
- Automation and Computer Systems;
- Accounting, Finance, and Business Activities;
- Economics and Management;
- Hotel, Restaurant and Tourism Business;
- Fermenting, Canning, and Sugar Industries;
- Health-improving Products, Technology and Food Expert;
- Pre-University Training;
- Online Learning - E-NUFT.

== Notable alumni ==
- Yuriy Kosiuk, billionaire and CEO of Ukraine's largest agricultural company MHP
- Mykola Sanov (1966-1981 - Minister of Food Industry of the Ukrainian SSR)
- Igor Stepanenko (1965 - Minister of Food Industry of the Ukrainian SSR)
- Mykola Kulynych (1981-1984 - Minister of Food Industry of the Ukrainian SSR)
- Hryhoriy Zagorodny (1985 - Minister of Food Industry of the Ukrainian SSR)
- Oleksandr Vasylchenko (CEO of Association "Ukrhlibprom")
- Anatoly Kosovan (Director of the State Scientific Research Institute of bakery industry, President of the Russian Union of Bakers, a corresponding member of the Russian Academy of Agricultural Sciences)
- Petro Parkhomenko (CEO of ZAO "Kyivkhlib" Honored Worker of Industry of Ukraine, winner of the International Open rating of popularity and quality "Golden Fortune-98")
- Liudmyla Gournac (director of the Kyiv bakery-confectionery combine, Honored Worker of Industry of Ukraine, a corresponding member of the Ukrainian Technological Academy)
- Anatoly Dzis (ex-CEO of Kyiv Roshen factory, Honored Worker of Industry of Ukraine, the author of 32 certificates for inventions)
- Maya Burdeeva (the head of the production of the chocolate factory Rainford, awarded with gold medal of VDNH of Ukraine for the development of new types of products)
- Oleksandr Slobodian (President of ZAO Obolon on a voluntary basis, the President of FC «Obolon», during four years) is one of the best top-managers of Ukraine, in 2003 at the International Competition "Golden Trade Marks" was awarded the Honorary Order "Public Recognition"
- Egor Shyshenok (President of the "League of Investment Development of Ukraine" public organization, CEO of the "Quality Guaranteed" group companies, public figure and popularizer of entrepreneurship)
- Vladimir Eroshenko (CEO factory "Rosynka", the nominee of the rating Top-100. The best top-managers of Ukraine)
- Hryhoriy Surkis, Deputy of the Verkhovna Rada of Ukraine, the President of the Football Federation of Ukraine, member of the UEFA Executive Committee, the winner of the first independent Ukrainian award "Prometheus-Prestige" and the "Man of the Year" in the nomination "Businessman of the Year" (1996, 1998), "the Maecenas of the year" (1997, 1999)

== See also ==
- List of Jesuit sites
- WFC Ateks Kyiv
- List of universities in Ukraine
