= Artem Obolensky =

Russian businessman

- Born: 23 December 1975 (age 50); Kyiv, USSR
- Occupations: Businessman and Banker

Artem Obolensky (Russian: Артём Алексеевич Оболенский; born 23 December 1975) is a Russian banker and businessman.

== Biography ==
Artem Alekseevich Obolensky was born and raised in Kyiv. He graduated from Northumbria University in the UK in 1996, where he earned a bachelor's degree in International Accounting and Finance. In 1997, he graduated from Kyiv National Economic University, and in 2002, from the Fordham University in the United States, specializing in Economics.

== Career ==
The company "RusGazDobycha" (JSC), which together with PJSC "Gazprom" implements investment projects in the field of gas processing.
