= PrJSC MHP =

Ukrainian international food & agrotech company

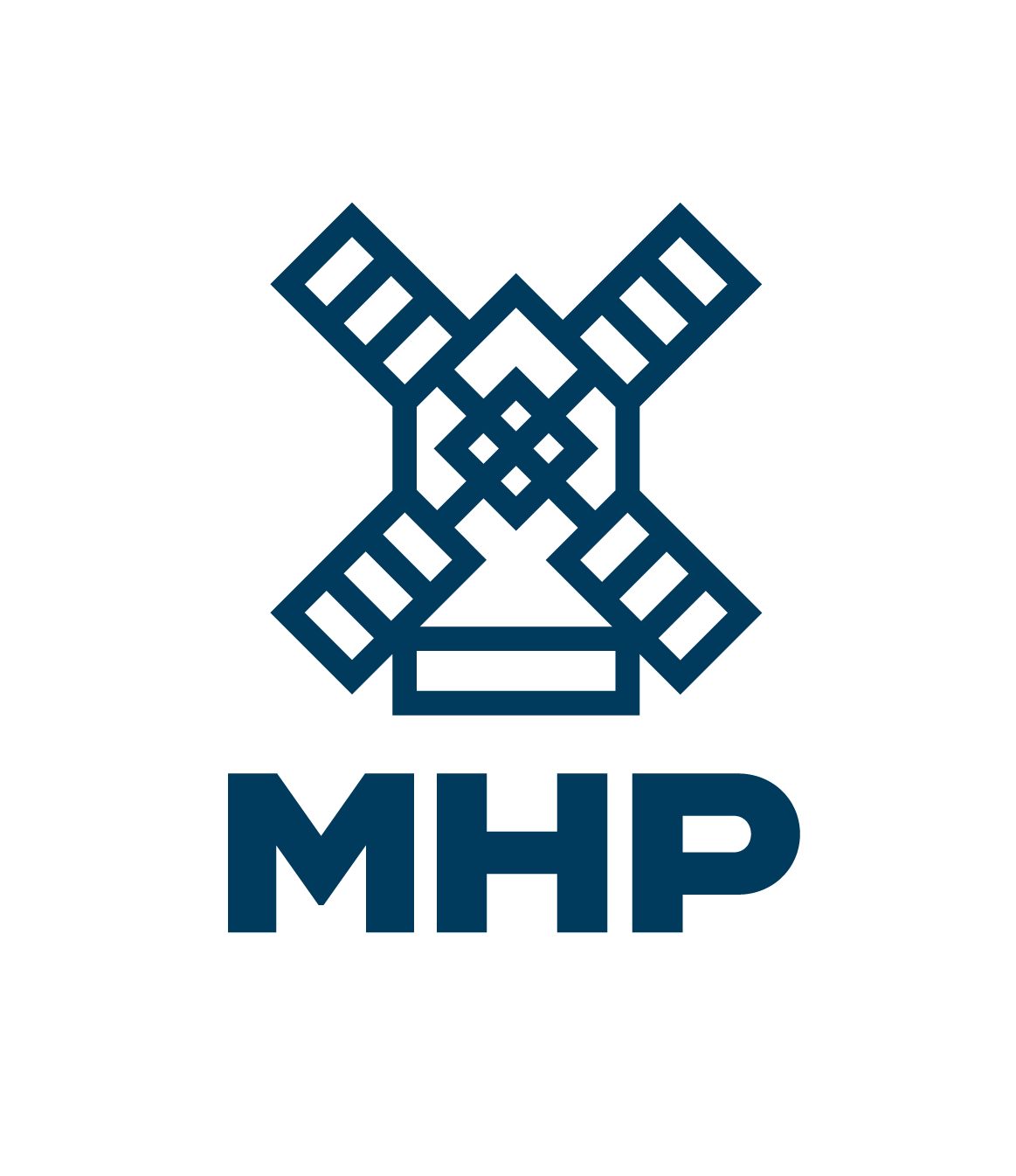
- Company type: Private joint-stock-company
- Industry: Agriculture, Foodtech
- Founded: 1998
- Headquarters: Kyiv, Ukraine
- Area served: World Wide
- Key people: Yuriy Kosiuk (Founder, CEO)
- Website: http://www.mhp.com.ua/en

PrJSC MHP (Ukrainian: ПрАТ МХП; PrJSC «MHP») is a Ukrainian food and agritech company, employing over 32,000 people in Ukraine and abroad, MHP is ranked among the top 10 employers in Ukraine, according to Forbes Ukraine in 2024.

MHP, headquartered in Kyiv, operates in agriculture, food production, and retail, with manufacturing facilities in Ukraine and the Balkans, as well as subsidiaries in the Netherlands, the UK, the UAE, Saudi Arabia, and other EU countries. In 2008, MHP became the first Ukrainian agricultural company to secure foreign equity capital through an IPO on the London Stock Exchange.

The company was founded by Yuriy Kosyuk, who is the chairman.

== Operations ==
The board of directors includes Yuriy Kosyuk, Viktoriia Kapeliushna, Andriy Bulakh, John Rich, and independent non-executive directors Christakis Taoushanis, Philip J. Wilkinson, and Oscar Chemerinski.

MHP is the largest poultry producer in Europe and 8th in the world, according to the WATT Poultry International ranking.

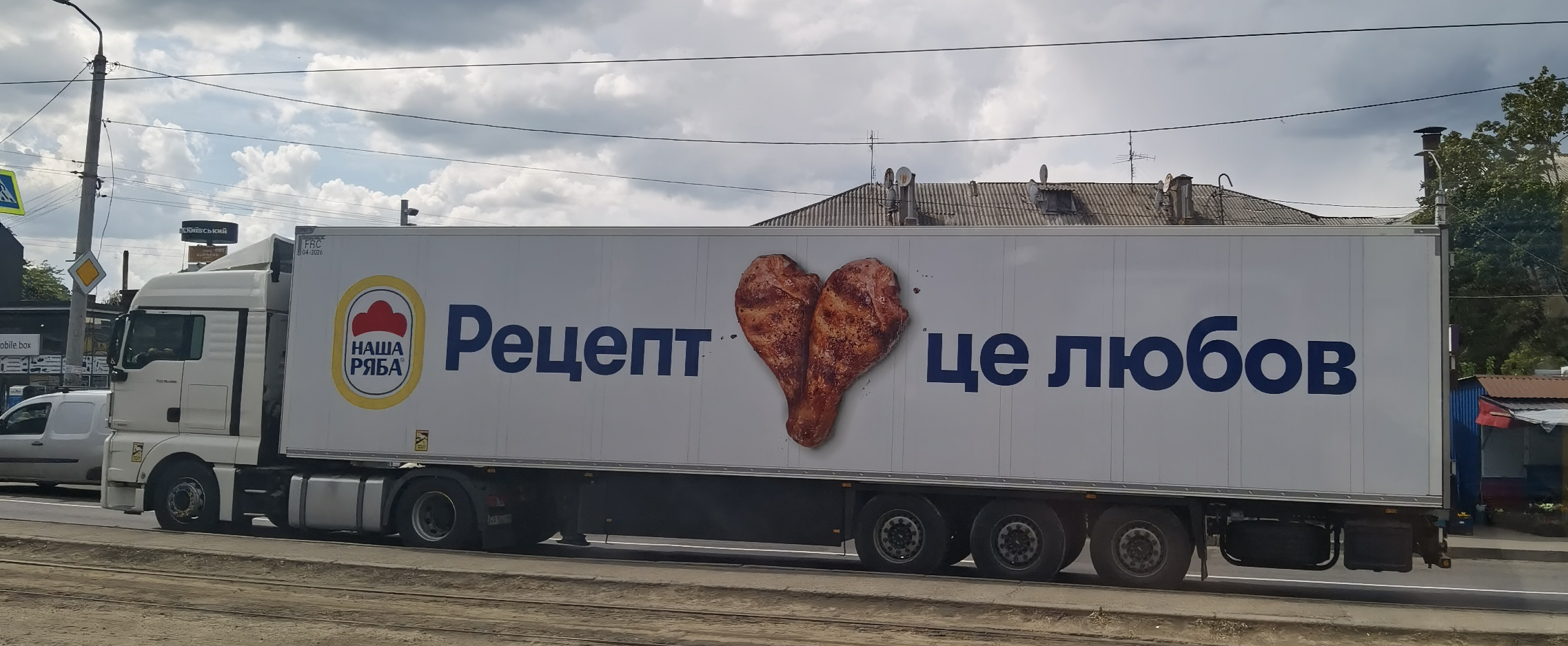
"Nasha Ryaba" truck

The company exports over 50% of its products to more than 70 countries, with key markets in the Middle East, the European Union, and Africa, with over 25 logistics hubs in Ukraine and abroad. Additionally, MHP is one of Ukraine’s leading exporters of vegetable oils.

MHP has over 15 product brands, including Nasha Ryaba, Apetytna, Super Fileo, Lehko!, Bashchynskyi, Skott Smeat, RyabChick, Domestic chicken, Ukrainian Chicken, Kurator, and international food brands Qualiko, Sultanah, Assilah, Al-Hassana and others.

== History ==
1998 — Yuriy Kosyuk founded Myronivsky Hliboproduct (MHP). The company acquired a controlling stake in Myronivsky Cereal and Feed Mill OJSC. Since 2021, it has been renamed MHP JSC.

1999 — MHP became the owner of the Peremoha Poultry Farm, marking the start of industrial-scale poultry meat production after modernization.

2001 — The Druzhba Narodiv Nova Poultry Farm joined MHP. The Starinska Poultry Farm, specializing in parent flock breeding, also became part of MHP.

2002 — The Nasha Ryaba brand of chilled chicken meat was launched.

2003 — In December, MHP became the first Ukrainian company to receive a loan from the International Finance Corporation (IFC). The funds were used to expand and modernize production facilities.

2004 — MHP commissioned a sunflower seed processing plant.

2005 — MHP acquired Zernoproduct, a company specializing in grain cultivation and dairy farming. The Katerynopil Elevator, which includes a feed mill and grain and oilseed storage facilities, also became part of MHP. Today, the site also houses oil pressing and oil extraction plants.

2006 — MHP completed the construction of Ukraine's first meat processing plant for ready-to-cook and ready-to-eat products, the Myronivka Meat Processing Plant Lehko!, one of the largest in the country. The same year, the agricultural enterprises Urozhai and Agrofort joined MHP.

2007 — The first production line of Myronivska Poultry Farm was launched. To fully support this facility with resources and feed, two additional feed production lines were opened at the Katerynopil Elevator, while Starinska Poultry Farm expanded its capacity for hatching eggs. With the new line, MHP’s production volume increased by 70%. MHP also acquired agricultural enterprises in Western Ukraine: Perspektyv and Buffalo.

2008 — MHP conducted its Initial Public Offering (IPO) on the London Stock Exchange, becoming the first Ukrainian agricultural company to be listed on the Main Market. The company product line expanded with the addition of meat and sausage products under the Bashchynskyi brand.

2009 — In June, the construction of the second production line at the Myronivka Poultry Farm was completed, enabling the facility to reach full capacity of approximately 200,000 tons of chicken per year. In September, the sunflower processing capacity at the Katerynopil Elevator was increased. This allowed MHP to meet the demand for sunflower protein required for feed production.

2010 — Construction began on the poultry farm at the Vinnytsia Poultry Farm in Ladyzhyn, which would later become the largest poultry production facility in Europe. Additionally, MHP expanded its agricultural land bank by acquiring the farming enterprises Urozhaina Kraina and Ridnyi Krai, strengthening its vertical integration.

2011 — MHP initiated the Biogas project, aimed at constructing a biogas plant utilizing chicken manure at the facilities of the Oril-Leader poultry farm. The project aligns with the company’s goal of achieving energy efficiency and independence.

2012 — The first phase of the Vinnytsia Poultry Farm was completed and commissioned.

2013 — By the end of the year, nine growing zones at the Vinnytsia Poultry Farm were operating at full capacity. For the first time, MHP distributed quarterly dividends to its shareholders, following global best practices. The company also began exporting its products to the EU. Additionally, MHP expanded its land bank in Ukraine by acquiring the agricultural enterprises Agro-S and Agrokriaz.

2014 — MHP participated for the first time in the world’s largest food exhibitions: GULFOOD (Dubai, UAE) and SIAL (Paris, France). The company’s export geography expanded to 50 countries across the CIS, Asia, Africa, and the Middle East. MHP’s export volumes continued to grow. To support global market exports, the company launched the Qualiko brand.

2015 — MHP participated for the first time in the international AGUNA exhibition (Cologne, Germany), signing a total of 310 contracts during the event. The company continued its policy of implementing precision farming practices and improving land bank management. MHP also acquired the agricultural enterprise Zakhid-Agro.

2016 — MHP opened its first European office and production facility in the Netherlands, marking the company’s entry into the European market. MHP launched the ‘Village. Steps to Development’ micro-grant program aimed at encouraging social activity in rural communities. The company also began implementing the Global G.A.P. integrated agricultural production management system.

2017 — Construction began on the second phase of the Vinnytsia Poultry Farm. MHP underwent a rebranding, and on November 7, 2017, the company presented its updated corporate logo.

For the first time, Olena Kosyuk, Director of the Quality and Product Development Department, represented MHP at the International IFC Food Safety Forum. This was made possible because MHP was among the first companies in Ukraine to implement the HACCP system (Hazard Analysis and Critical Control Points) at its facilities.

2018 — MHP began negotiations to acquire Perutnina Ptuj Group, an international company and the largest producer of poultry and poultry-based products in Southeast Europe. The acquisition was finalized in early 2019. Construction started on Biogas Ladyzhyn, Europe’s largest biogas complex for processing chicken manure and MHP’s second biogas facility.

2019 — MHP started its transformation from a company focused on raw material production to a culinary business. That year, the company’s global depositary receipts (GDRs) were admitted for circulation in Ukraine.

2020 — The company launched new retail formats: MeatMarket stores, Döner Market restaurants, and the Secrets of the Chef gastro studio.

2021 — MHP is ranked among the TOP 3 agricultural holdings in Ukraine.

2023 — MHP invested in Ukraine's development and became the largest taxpayer in the agricultural sector.

2024 — MHP was ranked among the top 5 largest investors in Ukraine by Forbes.

2024 — MHP was included in Ukraine’s TOP 10 best employers by Forbes.

2024 — The company launched a new direction, MHP Food Service, aimed at helping other businesses improve employee nutrition and supporting delivery services, canteen operators, and event catering providers in scaling their operations.

Also in 2024, MHP launched a new brand — Super Filleo. The product features boneless chicken thigh fillet, designed to meet consumer demand for convenience and high quality. Super Filleo is part of MHP’s range of ready-to-cook solutions for both home and professional use.

2024 — MHP presented its culinary solutions at SIAL Paris 2024, one of the world’s largest food exhibitions. The company showcased value-added products under the brands Qualiko, Ukrainian Chicken, Sultanah, Assilah, Poli, and Chick&Go, and introduced visitors to its production facilities through VR technology.

2024 — In September, MHP officially became the legal owner of 70% of KK & Sons, which owns the Ukrainian logistics company “KTL Ukraine. Also MHP invested in LLC Ukrainian Meat Hutir.

2024 — The Saudi Agricultural and Livestock Investment Company (SALIC), a government-owned investment company from Saudi Arabia, became a shareholder in MHP by acquiring a 12.6% stake in the company.

== Overview ==
=== Ukraine ===
MHP produces, processes, and sells food products, including culinary items (ready-to-cook and ready-to-eat products): chicken meat (chilled and frozen), processed meat products, vegetable oils (sunflower and soybean), as well as animal feed.

In Ukraine, MHP is a leading producer of food products, ranging from chilled chicken meat to pizza, ready-to-eat meals, and meat snacks.

MHP's land bank spans 360,000 hectares across 12 regions of Ukraine.

=== The Balkans ===
MHP continues to grow its international presence and expand export markets, ensuring stable operations in Ukraine. A key part of the MHP SE group, Perutnina Ptuj is a leading poultry and meat processing company in the Balkans, with production facilities in Slovenia, Croatia, Serbia, and Bosnia and Herzegovina. Additionally, the company operates distribution centers in Austria, Macedonia, and Romania, delivering products to 15 European countries.

As the parent company, MHP shares its best practices in production and business operations with its subsidiaries. Thanks to MHP’s support, Perutnina Ptuj has strengthened its production capabilities, revamped its organizational structure and procurement processes, adopted the OKR methodology, and accelerated its digital transformation, all of which have significantly boosted the company’s operational efficiency and performance. Key brands: Perutnina Ptuj and Poli.

== Social responsibility ==
For its employees serving in the military, MHP ensures job security and continues to pay their salaries. The company fulfills the needs of their military units and supports the soldiers’ families by providing material, psychological, and legal assistance, as well as helping to resolve everyday issues. When necessary, MHP also offers medical support, psychological care, and financial aid.

For veterans returning from service, MHP provides health checks, medical treatment, and rehabilitation, as well as social, psychological, and legal support. The company assists with retraining and adaptation, and when necessary, creates new job opportunities.

=== MHP Eco energy ===
The company was founded in 2011. Since 2012, the company has been implementing and managing sustainable energy projects including biogas complex development and exploitation.

MHP operates three biogas complexes — two in Ukraine and one in the Balkans. These facilities allow the company to efficiently utilize production waste, generate clean green energy, significantly reduce greenhouse gas emissions, and produce environmentally friendly organic fertilizers.

At the end of 2019, the first stage of the Biogas Ladyzhyn complex was commissioned by Vinnytsia Poultry Farm LLC with an energy capacity of 12 MWh. This is the first biogas plant in Europe of such capacity and level of technology, which operates on chicken manure and waste from a broiler chicken processing complex.

International organizations have confirmed the effectiveness and relevance of the project in terms of environmental and safety standards. The MHP Eco Energy aims to develop and increase the efficiency of biomethane production technologies and to integrate the technology of production and biomethanization of green hydrogen as a part of a scientific consortium of the European Biogas Association.

=== Innovative Energy Projects ===
As part of the Innovate Ukraine program, supported by the UK government, MHP has been selected among 13 innovative green energy projects aimed at advancing Ukraine’s energy recovery and sustainability.

In collaboration with the UK, MHP will develop a new method for biogas production using microalgae, contributing to the development of innovative technologies for Ukraine’s energy sector.

=== Water pollution and risks of disappearance of water ===
One of the MHP's main environmental priorities is to reduce the consumption of water. All of MHP's water use is regularly monitored and metering units are subject to regular inspection and maintenance.

MHP is also constantly working on developing the use of leading technology in its treatment of wastewater. In Ukraine, during 2021, the quality of treated water discharged fully complied with the required regulatory standards. All MHP enterprises strictly adhere to current regulatory requirements.

In media there was a discussion on one of the MHP facilities are located near Kaniv, Cherkaska Oblast. Activists claimed that water utilized and contaminated during the production process flowed to Rosava river. Research of MHP with Cherkasy State Technological University found no pollution caused by MHP in the river near its operations in Cherkasy oblast.

Furthermore, MHP installed modern wastewater treatment facilities, manufactured by the Dutch producer Nijhuis Water Technologies. The company facilities in the region are subjected to state supervision, which is carried out by the State Environmental Inspectorate of Ukraine and the State Consumer Service of the Cherkasy region. In addition, full-time ecologists and the laboratory that operates at MHP's sewage treatment plants carry out internal control.

=== Community development ===
MHP works with a wide variety of stakeholders to enable effective community development through financial and “in-kind” contributions. MHP's activities include volunteering and the provision of products and services, as well as providing material assets such as medicines and food.

In 2021, the MHP - Hromady Charitable Foundation was renamed and is now called the MHP - Hromady Sustainable Development Fund (“the Fund”). This is to reflect the sustainable development aims of the organisation Благодійний фонд МХП Громаді. During 2021, the Fund made community investments of ₴108 million in partnership with other organizations such as the ISAR “Unity”, Zagoriy Foundation.

The work of the Fund has four areas of focus:

- Micro-grant awards for community initiatives and micro-business to create a powerful platform for community, business and government interaction;
- Support for cultural, and educational projects to strengthen the national identity of the Ukrainian people;
- Support for environmental projects to draw public attention to the importance of environmental protection and conservation; and
- Support for public health: The Doctor for the Village project is often the only opportunity for people to receive quality medical services in more remote areas of Ukraine.

Open-Air Cinema

This is the first large-scale national tour of Ukrainian cinema. In 2021, it visited 43 settlements (villages and small towns) where there is no access to cinemas.

Micro-grant competitions

Time to go Ukraine! Micro-grants for community development were awarded to help solve social problems in villages and small towns. The projects generally support local civic initiatives. 93 projects from 12 regions of Ukraine became winners and received grants of up to ₴50,000.

Village steps to development

This is a competition to select micro-grants for projects aiming to stimulate small and microentrepreneurship in rural areas. 24 winning projects from the Cherkasy and Vinnytsia regions were selected and were granted ₴50,000. 11 entrepreneurs started their own businesses, and 13 other projects were supported. The project is supported by the United Nations Development Programme in Ukraine within the framework of the Partnership for Sustainable Development project.

Green planet with MHP This project aims to support the creation of parks, squares and green spaces within local communities through tree planting. The project has been running for two years. 17,000 tree seedlings were planted in 2020, and a further 16,400 tree seedlings in 2021.

=== MHP operations and Russian full-scale invasion to Ukraine ===
Since the beginning of the full-scale war on February 24, 2022, the company has been facing significant logistical and infrastructure challenges in Ukraine. While MHP continued commercial sales in Ukraine since the war began, export sales have ceased as a result of ports being closed, while export delivery by truck remained practically impossible.

During March and April, MHP team has been developing alternative logistic routes for exports, so that insignificant volumes have been delivered outside of Ukraine. Driven by restricted sales both inside and outside of the country, MHP had to decrease poultry capacity utilization to 80-85%

Due to shelling by the occupying forces on March 12, in the village of Kvitneve (Kyiv region), a fire broke out in a warehouse (rented by the сompany, two buildings) where frozen MHP chicken meat products were stored. As a result of the fire, over 3,000 tonnes of poultry products were lost. The facility was one of the largest warehouses for storage of frozen products in Ukraine and was predominantly used by large local retail chains. As hostilities in the Donetsk region intensified, in April, MHP decided to temporarily suspend operations of the “Ukrainian Bacon” (meatprocessing operations, c.34,000 tonnes annual capacity, Kramatorsk district, Donetsk region). As of the date of the report release, the facility has not been damaged and is under MHP control. Currently, MHP has a key responsibility in the food security of Ukraine and it has continued its operations despite significant difficulties and disruptions. The company continues providing humanitarian aid (mainly through food supply) to the population of Ukraine since the beginning of the war and working hard to manage logistical challenges across all regions of Ukraine. Since the war began, the company has provided around 11,000 tonnes of free-of-charge poultry products, other food, equipment, cars, diesel and different materials as part of its humanitarian mission.

Support of International Finance Institutions to MHP

MHP is a client of large international finance institutions, namely EBRD, EIB, IFC. These international institutions use public money of their member countries to stimulate economy of developing countries like Ukraine by providing loans to sustainable businesses. These institutions have their policies requiring their finding to comply with social, environmental, transparency, and other norms. In 2019 EBRD announced that they stopped funding MHP business after MHP used a loophole in the EU-Ukraine Association agreement and exporting chicken filet beyond adopted quotas. In 2018, communities affected by MHP's Vinnytsia poultry farm filed a complaint with the IFC and the EBRD. The complaint has led to an ongoing mediation process between the parties to the conflict, which is mostly confidential.
