= Oleksiy Plotnikov =

Ukrainian economist and politician (born 1965)

- Олексій Плотніков

People's Deputy of Ukraine of the 6 convocation
- In office 23 November 2007 – 12 December 2012
- Constituency: Party of Regions

People's Deputy of Ukraine of the 5 convocation
- In office 25 May 2006 – 23 November 2007
- Constituency: Party of Regions

Parliamentary Assembly of the Council of Europe (PACE)
- In office 26 April 2010 – 20 January 2013

Personal details
- Born: Oleksiy Vitaliyovych Plotnikov; 10 June 1965 (age 61) Zaporizhzhia, Ukrainian SSR, Soviet Union (now Ukraine)
- Citizenship: Ukrainian citizenship
- Education: Kyiv National Economic University (BA, MA, PhD); Kyiv Taras Shevchenko National University (DSc)
- Occupation: Economist; Politician

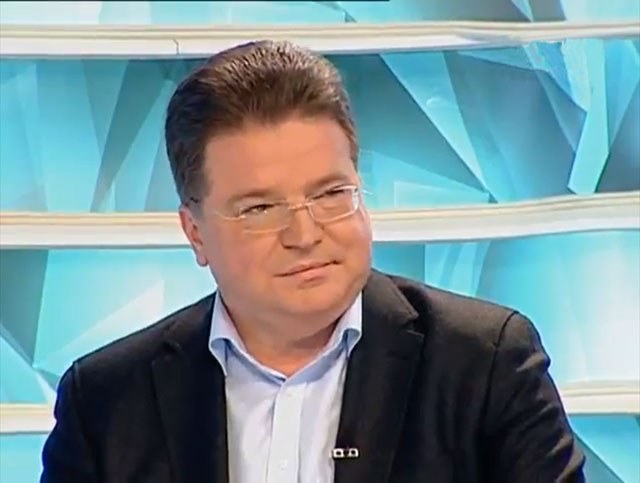
Oleksiy Plotnikov

Oleksiy Vitaliyovych Plotnikov (Ukrainian: Олексій Віталійович Плотніков [oˈlɛksʲij plotˈnʲikof]; born 10 June 1965) is a Ukrainian economist and politician. He obtained his doctorate in economics in 1994, and became a professor in 1998. He subsequently became a People's Deputy of Ukraine (Member of the Parliament of Ukraine) of the 5th and 6th convocations (2006-2012), and participated in the Parliamentary Assembly of the Council of Europe (PACE) Committee on Equality and Non-Discrimination from 2010 to 2013.

== Education ==
In 1986, he graduated from the Faculty of Finance and Economics of the Kyiv Institute of National Economy (now the Kyiv National Economic University) with a degree in finance and credit.

In 1991, at the Kyiv Institute of National Economy, he completed his PhD thesis on "Financial and Economic Relations in the Process of Property Sales" in the specialty "Political Economy".

In 1994, at the Kyiv Taras Shevchenko National University, he completed his doctoral dissertation (DSc) on "Financial Management in Transnational Corporations" in the specialty "International Economic Relations".

In 1998, the Institute of World Economy and International Relations of the National Academy of Sciences of Ukraine awarded him the academic title of Professor in the specialty "World Economy and International Economic Relations".

== Career ==
1992-1994: Senior Researcher at the Department of World Market Models and Privatization Problems, Institute of World Economy and International Relations of the National Academy of Sciences of Ukraine.

1994-2012: Head of the Department of International Monetary and Financial Relations, Institute of World Economy and International Relations of the National Academy of Sciences of Ukraine.

2006-2007: People's Deputy of Ukraine of the 5th convocation. Deputy Chairman of the Committee on Economic Policy (since 07.2006); Chairman of the Investigative Commission of the Verkhovna Rada (Parliament) of Ukraine on checking the effectiveness of the functioning of Special Economic Zones and Priority Development Territories in Ukraine (since 21.12.2006); Member of the Ukrainian part of the Committee on Parliamentary Cooperation Between Ukraine and the European Union; Head of the group on inter-parliamentary relations with the Republic of Bulgaria; Head of the group on inter-parliamentary relations with the Republic of Macedonia; Member of the Party of Regions faction (since 05.2006).

2007-2012: People's Deputy of Ukraine of the 6th convocation. Member of the Committee on Economic Policy (since 12.2007), Chairman of the Subcommittee on International Economic Policy; Member of the investigative commission of the Verkhovna Rada (Parliament) of Ukraine on the investigation of the circumstances of violation of the Constitution of Ukraine, the Land Code of Ukraine, other laws of Ukraine and the adoption of illegal decisions by the Kyiv City Council in the period from 2007 to 2010; Head of the group on inter-parliamentary relations with the Republic of Bulgaria; Member of the Party of Regions faction (since 11.2007). Full Member of the Parliamentary Assembly of the Council of Europe (PACE) Committee on Equality and Non-Discrimination (since 04.2010).

2012-2013: Adviser to the Prime Minister of Ukraine.

2012-2014: Chief Researcher, Institute of World Economy and International Relations of the National Academy of Sciences of Ukraine.

Since 03.2018: Leading Researcher, Institute of Economics and Forecasting of the National Academy of Sciences of Ukraine.

He was recognised as a Civil Servant of the 1st Rank in October 2007.

In August 2010, the President of Ukraine awarded him the honorary title of Honored Economist of Ukraine.

== Books ==
Author of more than 200 academic works; in particular:

• Financial and Economic Relations in the Market Economy, 1992: ISBN 5-7707-1278-3.

• Dynamics of External Debts of Ukraine (co-author), 2000: ISBN 966-7761-00-2.

• Ultima Ratio of Economic Reforms, 2003: ISBN 966-8251-18-0.

• Financial Management in Transnational Corporations: Textbook, 2004: ISBN 966-7982-18-1; 2011: ISBN 978-966-2588-00-2.

• International Economic Relations: Textbook (co-author), 2005: ISBN 9668251-72-5.

• Global Financial Crisis: Lessons for the World and Ukraine (co-author), 2009: ISBN 978-966-03-4825-7.

• World Economy: Global Financial Crisis (co-author), 2010: ISBN 978-966-03-5210-0.

• International Economic Relations: Textbook (co-author), 2017: ISBN 978-617-7582-09-9.

• International Finance: Textbook (co-author), 2019: ISBN 978-617-7841-03-5.

• Globalization: World Economy and Ukrainian realities (co-author), 2020: ISBN 978-617-7939-46-6.

• The General Situation with Climate Change in the World and Risk Assessment for the Global Economy (Springer Nature, 2023, https://link.springer.com/chapter/10.1007/978-3-031-16477-4_3).

• The Influence of the Fragmentation of the World Economy on the Post-War Reconstruction of Ukraine (Palgrave Macmillan, 2025, https://link.springer.com/chapter/10.1007/978-3-031-90851-4_3).

== Bibliography ==
- Офіційний сайт Верховної Ради України
- Історія Українського парламентаризму. У трьох томах. / Ред. рада: В. М. Литвин (гол. ред. ради) та ін. — К.: Видавництво «Дніпро», 2010. — Т.3 — С. 535. — ISBN 978-966-578-202-5.
- Довідник «Офіційна Україна сьогодні», видавництво «К. І.С»
- Плотников Алексей Витальевич. — Лига. Досье
