= Volodymyr Yurchyshyn =

Ukrainian graphic artist and illustrator

- Володимир Юрчишин
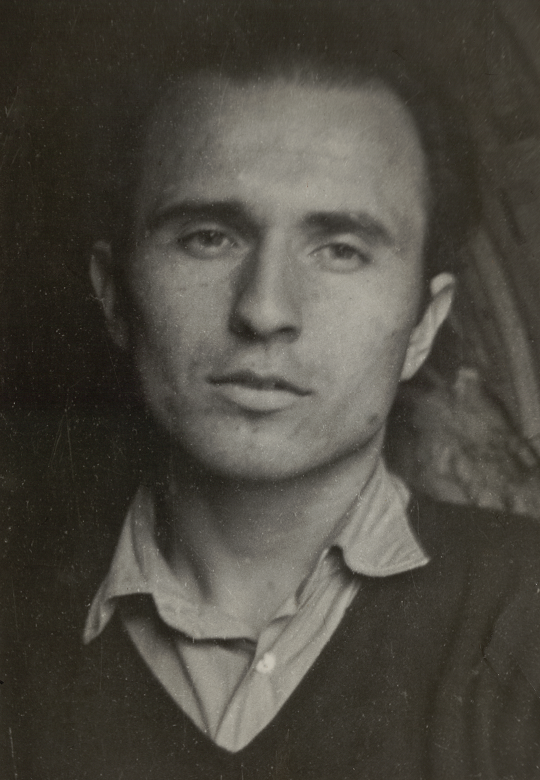
- Born: 27 July 1934; Dachnów, Poland
- Died: 17 August 2010 (aged 76); Kyiv, Ukraine
- Education: Ivan Fedorov Ukrainian Polygraphic Institute, L'viv
- Known for: Artist, book designer
- Awards: Shevchenko National Prize (1990)

Volodymyr Ivanovych Yurchyshyn (Ukrainian: Володи́мир Іва́нович Юрчи́шин; 27 July 1934 – 17 August 2010) was a Ukrainian graphic artist and illustrator who was awarded the 1990 Shevchenko National Prize for his illustrations to the Primary Chronicle.

== Biography ==
Born July 27, 1935 (other sources – 1934) in the village of Dakhniv, in the San region, now in Poland, in the family of Ivan and Varvara (née Pekar) Yurchyshyn. In September 1945, the artist's family was deported to Soviet Ukraine.

From 1952 to 1957, he studied at the Ivan Fedorov Ukrainian Polygraphic Institute in L'viv (where his teacher was V. Forostetskyi), and he was also influenced by the works of Olena Kul'chyts'ka. After graduation he worked for the Kiev publishing houses "Naukova dumka", "Mystetstvo", "Vyshcha shkola", "Dnipro", and also for the journals "Narodna tvorchist' ta etnohrafiia" and "Obrazotvorche Mystetstvo". He was significantly influenced by P. Popov, the well-known specialist in old Ukrainian engraving, the famous scholar V. Sventsits'ka, and the masters of Ukrainian folk art.

He worked primarily in book design. Over a period of half a century, he developed and designed a huge number of publications, including works by T. Shevchenko, "Povist' mynulykh lit" (1982), "Litopys" by S. Velychko (1991), O. Il'chenko's novel "Kozats'komu rodu nema perevodu" (1967), collections of Ukrainian songs "Ukrains'ki pisni vydani М. Maksymovychem" (1962), "Zakarpats'ki pisni ta kolomyiky" (1965), "Narodni pisni Bukovyny v zapysakh Iuriia Fed'kovycha" (1968), "Pisni z polonyny" (1970), "Narodni perlyny" (1971), "Narodni pisni v zapysakh Lesi Ukrainky ta z ii spivu" (1971), "Ukrains'ki pisni u zapysakh Osypa i Fedora Bodians'kykh" (1978), the academic studies by V. Sventsits'ka "Ivan Rutkovych" (1966), by O. Bilets'kyi "Ukrains'kyi portretnyi zhyvopys XVII-XVIII stolit'" (1969), by M. Dragan "Ukrains'ka dekoratyvna riz'ba XVI-XVIII st." (1970), by Ia. Zapasko "Mystets'ka stadshchyna Ivana Fedorova" (1974), by Ia. Zapasko, Ia. Isaevych "Pamia'tky knyzhkovoho mystetstva" (1981–1984), by Z. Tarakhan-Bereza "Shevchenko – poet i khudozhnyk" (1985), by V. Ovsiichuk "Maistry ukrains'koho barokko. Zhovkivs'kyi kul'turnyi oseredok" (1991), by S. Bilokin' "Masovyi teror iak zasib derzhavnoho upravlinnia v SRSR" (1999) and others, catalogues of art exhibitions.

He made use of ornamental motifs in adding to modern books the heritage of old Ukrainian engraving and folk pictures. The designs of Volodymyr Yurchyshyn are a unique phenomenon in Ukrainian book art, where carefully integrated manuscript and typeset texts, geometric and floral ornaments are all united as one concept.

Apart from his work with books, he created many independent compositions – "The Family" (1988–1994), "Faith through the thorny road" (1978–1995), the series "Dumy" (1974–1979), "Owls" (2007–2008), the poster "1814–1861" (2008), dedicated to T. Shevchenko, and others.

He was one of the developers of modern Ukrainian scripts.

== Gallery ==
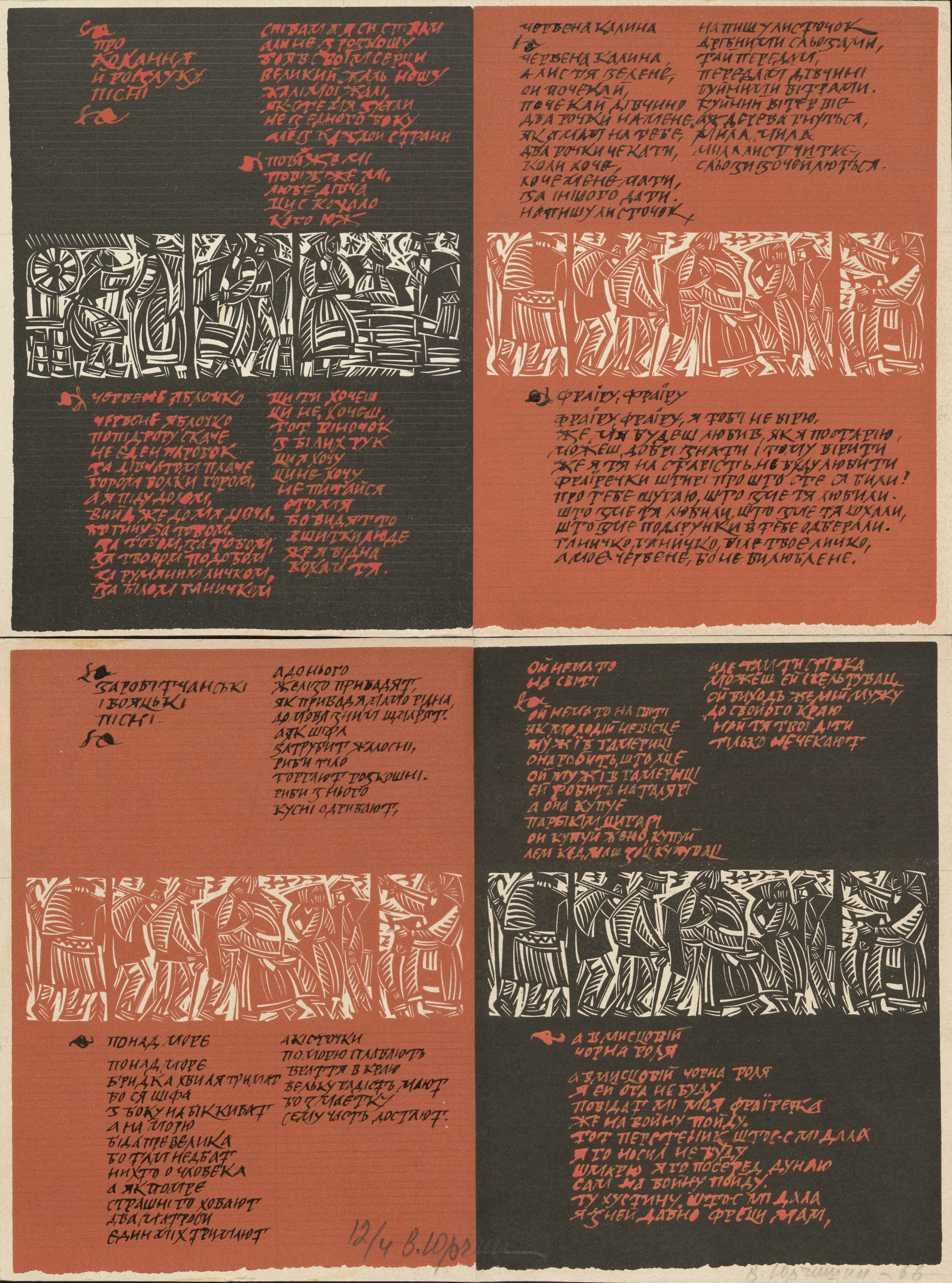
Lemkivs'ki pisni (1966-1975)

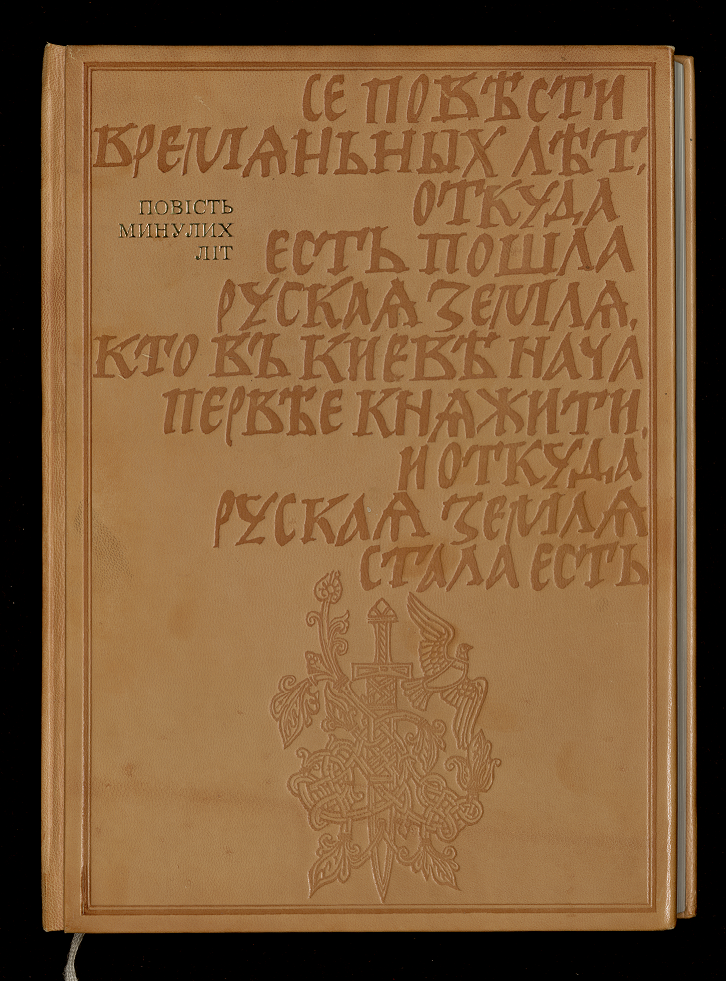
Povist' mynulykh lit. Cover (1982)

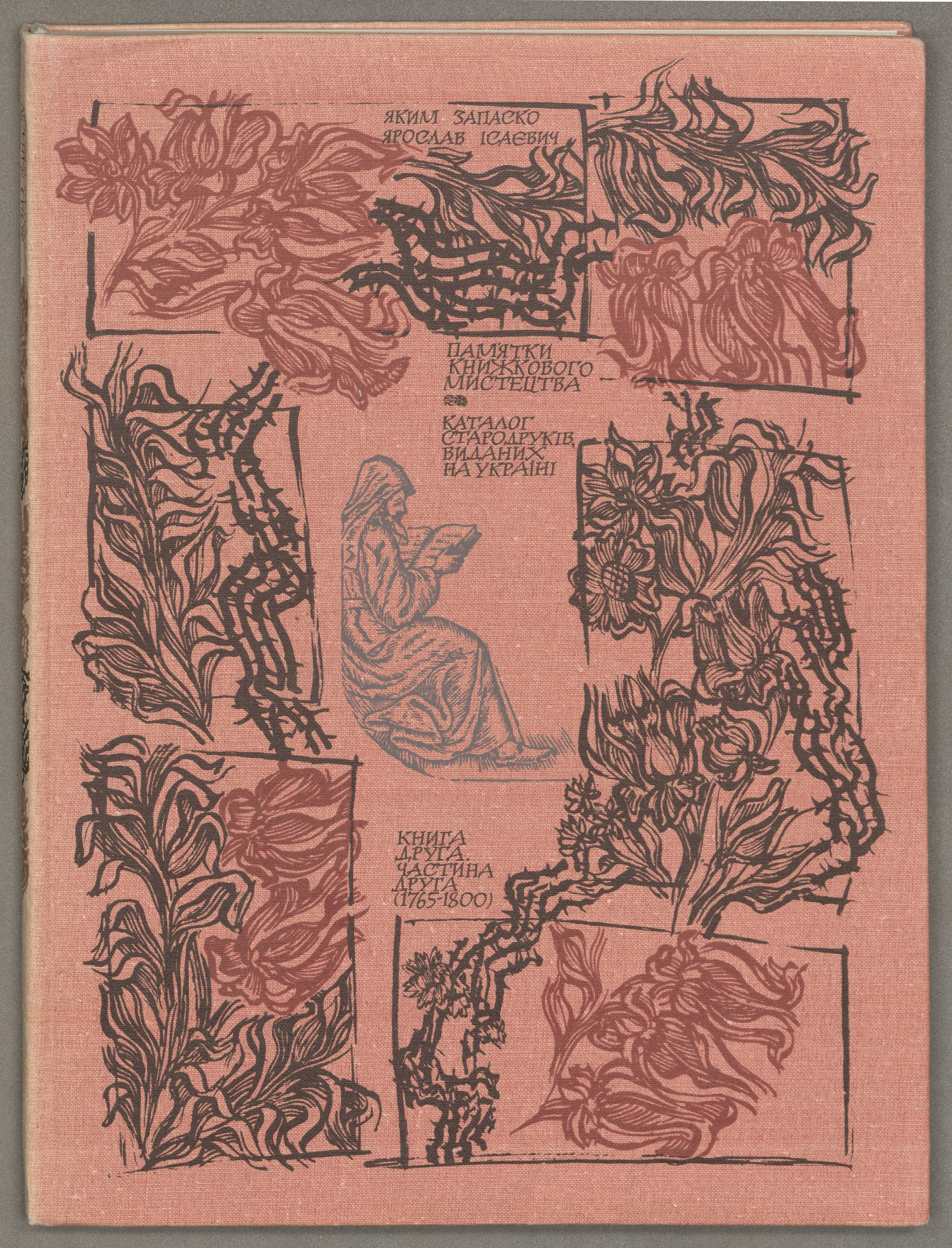
Pamia'tky knyzhkovoho mystetstva. Cover (1984)

== Awards and Prizes ==
- Shevchenko National Prize
