= All-Ukrainian Union "Democrats" =

Ukrainian political party registered in 1996

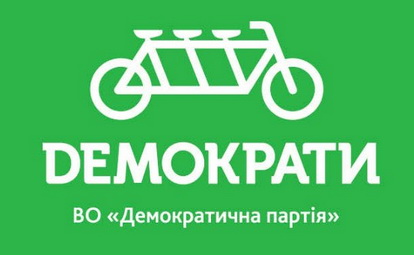

The All-Ukrainian Union "Democrats" (Ukrainian: Всеукраїнське об'єднання «Демократи», romanized: Vseukrainske obiednannia «Demokraty») is a political party in Ukraine registered in January 1996. Until 2013 it was named the Party of National Economic Development of Ukraine (Ukrainian: Партія національно-економічного розвитку України, romanized: Partiia natsionalno-ekonomichnoho rozvytku Ukrainy) During the 1998 elections the party won no seats, in the 2002 elections the party won 1 (single-mandate constituency) seat. In the 2006 elections and the 30 September 2007 elections, the party failed to win parliamentary representation.

The party did not participate in the 2012 or 2014 Ukrainian parliamentary election.

== See also ==
- Category:All-Ukrainian Union "Democrats" politicians
