= Vadym Hetman =

Ukrainian statesman, politician and banker

Hero of Ukraine Vadym Hetman
- Вадим Гетьман
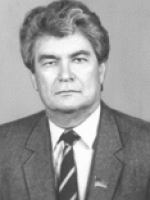

People's Deputy of Ukraine
- In office 18 March 1990 – 29 March 1998
- Constituency: Cherkasy Oblast, No. 425

2nd Chairman of the National Bank of Ukraine
- In office 24 March 1992 – 1993
- Preceded by: Volodymyr Matvienko
- Succeeded by: Viktor Yushchenko

Personal details
- Born: 12 July 1935 Snityn, Ukrainian Soviet Socialist Republic, Soviet Union (now Ukraine)
- Died: 22 April 1998 (aged 62) Kyiv, Ukraine
- Party: Independent
- Relations: Wife and two children

Vadym Petrovych Hetman (Ukrainian: Вадим Петрович Гетьман; 12 July 1935 – 22 April 1998) was a Ukrainian statesman, politician, and banker. He is credited with the creation of the National Bank of Ukraine, Ukraine's central bank. He was assassinated in April 1998 in his home in Kyiv. According to the Prosecutor General of Ukraine, the crime was paid for by former Prime Minister of Ukraine Pavlo Lazarenko. He was posthumously conferred the title of Hero of Ukraine on 11 July 2005.

== Early life and career ==
Vadym Petrovych Hetman was born in the village of Snityn, located in Poltava Oblast (at the time in the Ukrainian Soviet Socialist Republic), in 1935.

In 1956, he graduated from the Kyiv Financial-Economic Institute, after which he worked in various financial institutions in Zaporizhzhia Oblast. In 1975, Vadym Hetman was named the first vice-president to the Head of the Government Committee of Pricing of the Ukrainian SSR. In 1987, he became the head of the Agricultural-Industrial Bank of the Ukrainian SSR (since 1990 Ukraine Bank).

== Chairman of the National Bank ==
On 24 March 1992, Vadym Hetman was accepted as the Chairman of the National Bank of Ukraine. He supervised early monetary reforms in newly independent Ukraine through 1993, when he resigned from his position as the head of the supervisory board of the National Bank of Ukraine. However, he maintained close ties with his successor, Viktor Yushchenko. Hetman's signature appears on the original banknotes of Ukraine's national currency, the hryvnia, which was introduced in September 1996.

== People's Deputy of Ukraine ==
Hetman was also a member of the Verkhovna Rada (Note: Parliament of Ukraine) from 1990 to 1998. He went for his second term as deputy in 1994 from the Talne electoral district of Cherkasy Oblast as a nonpartisan. He received 50.97% of the vote in the first round of voting.

He ran for a third term in the 1998 Ukrainian parliamentary election, but failed to get re-elected, receiving only 21.85% of the vote, 3.87% below the required percentage to win. His opponent was First Deputy Minister of Information Mykhailo Onofryichuk.

He is also known to have complained to the then-President Leonid Kuchma about voting irregularities within the Verkhovna Rada itself.

== Assassination ==
Hetman was shot by an apparently professional killer in the elevator of his own apartment block in Kyiv on 22 April 1998.

The alleged assassin, 29-year-old Serhiy Kulev, a member of the "Kushner gang" from the Donbas, was only arrested in 2002. He was later sentenced to life imprisonment without bond in April 2003. The Office of the Prosecutor General of Ukraine has claimed that the assassination was ordered and paid for by Pavlo Lazarenko, a former Prime Minister of Ukraine. Lazarenko has denied responsibility for the killing.

Despite the Luhansk City Court's verdict, the case remains far from being certain. In early August 2005, the media reported that the convict filed an appeal to the Supreme Court of Ukraine on grounds that he had been forced to make a false confession. His lawyer subsequently made a public statement that the case was entirely fabricated.

== Awards and legacy ==
Vadym Hetman was posthumously conferred the title of Hero of Ukraine by President Viktor Yushchenko on 11 July 2005.

On 12 July 2005, a memorial plate was established in his honour on House № 13, where Hetman lived and was assassinated.

In 2005, the Kyiv National Economic University, which Hetman attended in the 1950s, was renamed in his honour.

On 19 April 2006, the Industrial Street in Kyiv was renamed in his honour.

A regatta cup, "Vadym Hetman Cup" bears his name.

Government offices
Preceded by Volodymyr Matvienko	Chairman of the National Bank of Ukraine; 1992–1993	Succeeded by Viktor Yushchenko
