= Kyiv National Economic University =

Public university in Kyiv, Ukraine

Coordinates: 50°27′23″N 30°26′27″E

- Київський національний економічний університет імені Вадима Гетьмана
- Type: Public
- Established: 1906
- Affiliations: Ministry of Education and Science of Ukraine
- Rector: Lukianenko Dmytro Grygorovych
- Students: >20,000
- Location: Kyiv, Ukraine
- Campus: Urban
- Website: kneu.edu.ua/en/
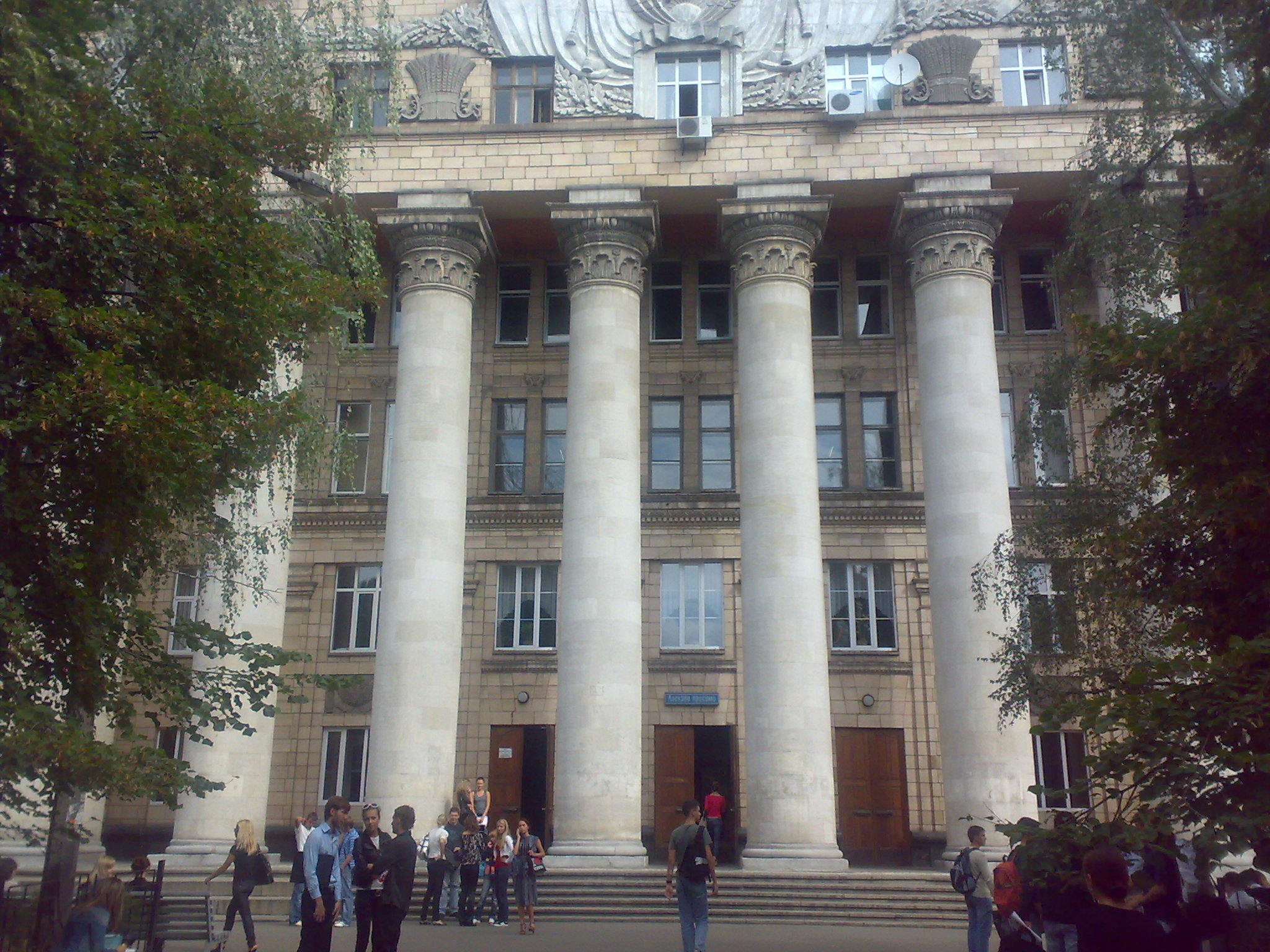

The Kyiv National Economic University is a self-governing public university in Kyiv, Ukraine. The university was founded in 1906 as Higher economics courses.

It was ranked #3 by the Ukrainian national ranking of the universities conducted by Compass in 2012. According to one of the leading university rankings in the world (Eduniversal, 2015), KNEU ranked second among universities in Ukraine. In 2020, in the same ranking, it took third place among Ukrainian universities.

In 2005, the university was named in honor of Vadym Hetman, a prominent Ukrainian banker, economist, and the founder of the National Bank of Ukraine.

== History of formation and development ==
- 1906 — Kyiv Higher Commercial Courses
- 1908 — Kyiv Commercial Institute
- 1920 — Kyiv Institute of National Economy (KINE)
- 1934 — Kyiv Financial and Economic Institute
- 1960 — Kyiv Institute of National Economy (KINE)
- 1992 — Kyiv State Economic University
- 1997 — Kyiv National University of Economics
- 2005 — Kyiv National Economic University named after Vadym Hetman
- 2010–2014 — State Higher Educational Institution Kyiv National Economic University named after Vadym Hetman — a self-governing (autonomous) research university

== General information ==
The Kyiv National Economic University is the largest economic educational institution in Ukraine. It is recognized in Ukraine and in the world as a training center for economists, managers and lawyers.

The area of the university is 118,765 m^{2} or 9.4 m^{2} per student. Academic infrastructure includes classrooms for lectures, rooms for seminars and workshops, computer classes and more. The total classroom area is 14,332.7 m^{2}. The university also has 6709 m^{2} gyms area and owns a stadium and 6 dormitories. The number of students in Kyiv National Economic University is approximately 15,000.

The mission of the university is to make a significant contribution to social development through research, generation of new knowledge, their dissemination and training of competitive professionals and creative individuals.

=== Bachelor programs ===
- Law;
- Economic theory;
- Economic cybernetics;
- International economics;
- Business economics;
- Economy of agroindustrial complex;
- Personnel management and labour economics;
- Applied statistics;
- Marketing;
- Finance and credit;
- Finance and credit – specialization Banking (Credit);
- Accounting in agroindustrial complex;
- Management;
- Computer sciences.

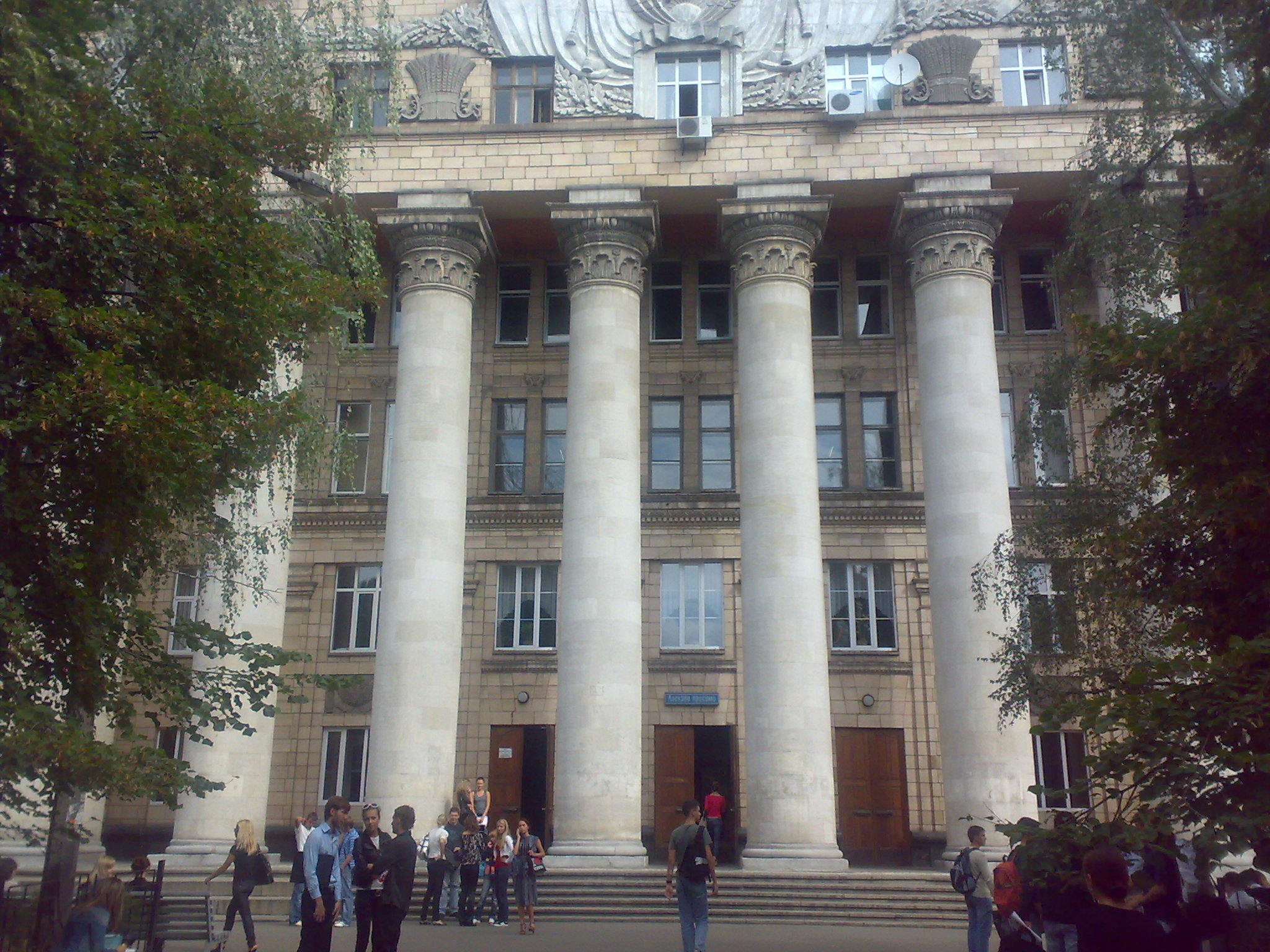
Main building

=== Divisions ===
- Student Tourist Club "Skify"
- Center of master's training
- Center of international relations
- Foreign citizens teaching division
- Department of science and postgraduate studies
- Ukrainian institute of stock market development
- Educational an methodical department
- Institute of higher education
- Primary trade-union organization of students and post-graduate students
- Student academic council
- Scientific student community
- Students' employment center "Perspective"
- Library
- Publishing house
- Sport center "Economist"
- Culture and arts center
- Campus
- Preventive medicine sanatorium

=== International organizations and programs ===
Kyiv National Economic University is a member of the following international organizations and programs:

- EDAMBA – "European Doctoral Programmes Association in Management and Business Administration".
- EPLO – "European Public Law Organization".
- EFMD – "European Foundation for Management Development".
- BSUN – "Black Sea Universities Network".
- "Magna Charta Universitatum".
- TEMPUS с "Trans-European Mobility Programme for University Studies".
- RSA – "Regional Studies Association". Archived from the original on 19 December 2008.
- EAC – "European Arbitration Chamber".
- "Alexander von Humboldt-Stiftung".
- CES – "Council for European Studies at Columbia University".
- the Ukrainian Bar Association Students League – "UBA Students League".

== Campuses and buildings ==
- Main building of KNEU
- Building # 2, 3, 5, 6, 7 of KNEU
- Library
- Dormitories: I, II, III, IV, V, VI
- Sport Complex "Economist"
- Publishing house
- Preventive medicine sanatorium

== Institutes and faculties ==
=== Institutes ===
- Educational and research institute of economic development (1997)
- Ukrainian institute of stock market development (1997)
- Institute of higher education (2009)
- Institute of financial controlling (2009)
- Institute of encyclopedic research in economics (2009)
- Institute of global economic policy (2009)
- Institute of credit relations (2009)
- French-Ukrainian institute of management (2010)
- Institute of economics and management of agroindustrial complex (2010)
- Institute of financial and economic research (2010)
- Institute of modeling and informational systems in economics (2010)
- Institute of accounting (2010)
- Institute of socio-economic relations (2010)
- Institute of legal research and law project work (2010)
- Institute of marketing (2011)
- Institute of innovative entrepreneurship (2011)

=== Faculties ===
- Economics and Management (1945)
- International Economics and Management (1992)
- Law (1993)
- Personnel Management and Marketing (1965)
- Accounting (1959)
- Economics of Agro-Industrial Industry (1945)
- Finance (1906)
- Crediting (2003)
- Informational Systems and Technology (1964)

=== Colleges ===
- KNEU College of Economics and Management
- KNEU College of Economics in Kyiv
- KNEU College of Information Systems and Technologies Kyiv
- Simferopol College of KNEU
- Romensky College of Economics of KNEU

== National rankings ==
=== National rankings ===
- Compass-2012 Rankings of Ukrainian universities:
  - in Overall Ranking – 3rd place;
  - in a Ranking by Subject «Business & Economics» – 2nd place;
  - in a Ranking of Universities in Central Region of Ukraine – 3rd place;
- University Ranking «TOP-200 Ukraine», 2011/2012:
  - in Overall Ranking – 10th place;
  - among economic universities – 1st place;
- Ranking by newspaper «Comments» – Ranking of Universities graduates of which are most wanted on the market, 2012. – 3rd place;
- University Ranking by magazine «Dengi» (Money), 2012:
  - Ranking in «Economics» – 2nd place;
  - Ranking in «Law» – 6th place;

=== International rankings ===
- Eduniversal Ranking – «3 Palmes – EXCELLENT Business Schools nationally strong and/or with continental links»;
- Eduniversal Best Masters ranking Eastern Europe:
  - Information Systems Management (Master in Information Systems in Management) – 4th place;
  - Engineering and Project Management (Master in Project Management and Consulting) – 6th place;
  - Accounting and Auditing (Master in Accounting and Auditing in Management of Business Enterprises) – 7th place;
  - Public Administration / Management (Master in Public Service) – 7th place;
  - General Management (Master in Management of Enterprises) – 9th place;
  - Marketing (Master in Marketing Management) – 9th place;
  - International Management (Master in Management of International Business) – 19th place;
  - Corporate Finance (Master in Financial Management) – 20th place;
  - Insurance (Master in Insurance Management) – 47th place;

== Notable alumni ==
- Tetiana Andrianova, attorney
- Anatolii Brezvin, Ukrainian businessman, politician, ice hockey executive
- Olena Derevianko, Ukrainian academic, Professor of Social Communications
- Volodymyr Matvienko, 1st Chairman of the National Bank of Ukraine
- Andrey Motovilovets, politician and entrepreneur
- Oleksiy Plotnikov, People's Deputy of Ukraine (Member of the Parliament of Ukraine) of the 5th and 6th convocations, Doctor of Economics, Professor
- Victoria Spartz (née Вікторія Кульгейко), American businesswoman who is a member of the United States House of Representatives
- Volodymyr Zelenskyy, 6th President of Ukraine

== See also ==
List of universities in Ukraine
