= MOSST Payments =

Mosst
- Type: Private
- Industry: Financial services
- Founded: 2015; 11 years ago
- Headquarters: Kyiv, Ukraine
- Products: Payment infrastructure services
- Website: mosst.ua

Mosst (LLC "MOSST") is a Ukrainian company operating in the payment services market as a technology payment services operator. It was entered into the payment infrastructure register maintained by the National Bank of Ukraine on the basis of the National Bank of Ukraine's Notice on the inclusion of information in the payment infrastructure register No. 27-0018/77886 dated 15 November 2017, in the capacity of a technology payment services operator. The company provides reliable and efficient solutions for processing financial transactions, supporting the development of digital payments and financial technologies in Ukraine.

== Services ==
As a technology payment services operator, Mosst provides the following services:

- Processing and routing of payment transactions
- Integration with banks and payment systems
- Fraud monitoring and risk management
- Technical support and maintenance of financial operations
- Implementation and maintenance of electronic payment solutions
