= Valeria Hontareva =

Ukrainian investment banker (born 1964)

Valeriia Gontareva
- Валерія Гонтарева
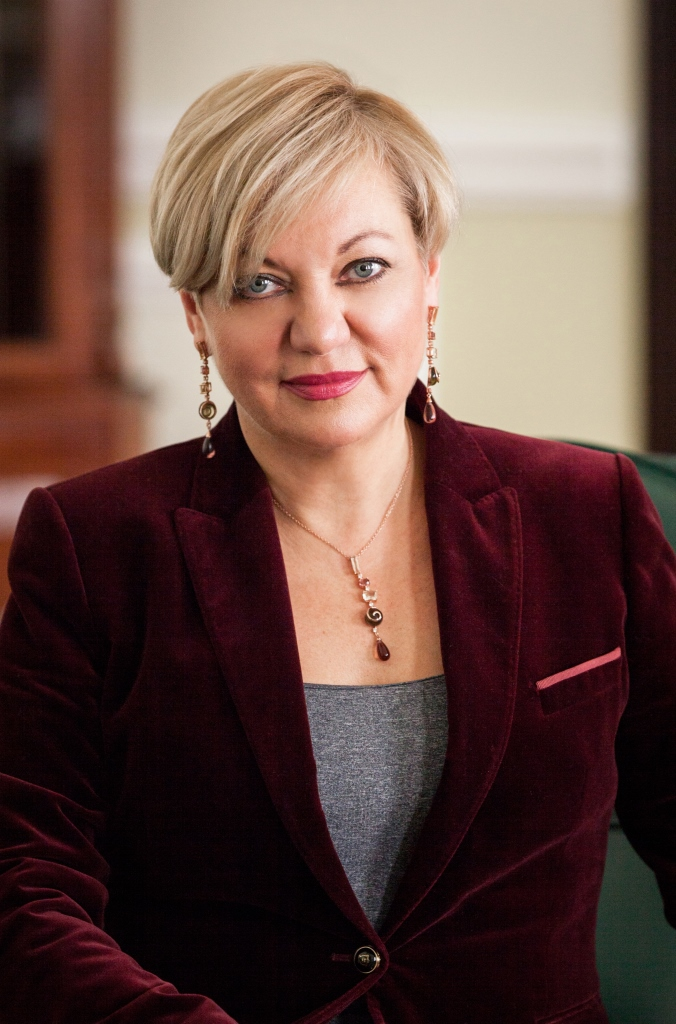
- Gontareva in 2015

10th Governor of the National Bank of Ukraine
- In office 19 June 2014 – 11 May 2017 (Note: Still not formally dismissed, but duties were taken over by Deputy Governor Yakiv Smoliy after she announced her resignation on 10 April 2017.)
- Preceded by: Stepan Kubiv
- Succeeded by: Yakiv Smoliy (acting)

Personal details
- Born: 20 October 1964 (age 62) Dnipropetrovsk, Ukrainian SSR, Soviet Union
- Citizenship: Ukraine
- Children: 2
- Education: Kyiv Polytechnic Institute (DEng); Kyiv National Economic University (MEc)
- Occupation: Investment banker

Valeriia Oleksiivna Gontareva (Note: Also spelled Valeria Hontareva and Valeria Gontareva.) (Ukrainian: Вале́рія Олексі́ївна Го́нтарева; born 20 October 1964) is a Ukrainian investment banker and millionaire. She served as Governor of the National Bank of Ukraine from 19 June 2014 until her resignation on 11 May 2017. In 2016, Focus named her the most influential woman in Ukraine. In 2019, the Financial Times included her in its list of the most influential women in the world.

== Early life and education ==
Hontareva was born in Dnipropetrovsk on 20 October 1964. She graduated from the Kyiv Polytechnic Institute in 1987 and from the Kyiv National Economic University with a Master of Economics in 1997.

=== Personal life ===
Hontareva is married and has two sons. In 2018, she moved to London.

== Career ==
After obtaining her degree in 1987, Hontareva was a junior researcher at the Ukrainian Centre for Standardization and Metrology for two years, and from 1989 to 1993, she worked as a design engineer in the institute Hiprostrommashyna. In 1993, Hontareva started her career in the financial sector and held top positions in the Kyiv branches of ING Bank and Societe Generale.

In 1996 she became director of resource management at Societe Generale in Ukraine and in 2001 deputy chairman of ING Bank (in 2007 for six months first deputy). From 2007 to 2014, she served as Chairwoman of then Investment Capital Ukraine (now ICU), Kyiv based financial group.

She officially sold her stakes in the company before becoming governor of the NBU. President Poroshenko hired for the sale of his Roshen holding her former employer company ICU beside Rothschild Group.

In her official public income declaration for 2013, Hontareva stated an income of ₴3,884,679, a car park with an Infinity FX35, a Porsche Cayenne, a Porsche Panamera, a Toyota Landcruiser, and several real estates. According to Hontareva's e-declaration for 2016, her total income amounted to ₴57 million (the most of which was due to the third tranche of selling her shares in ICU Holdings Limited - ₴52.57 million).

=== Governor of the National Bank of Ukraine ===
On 19 June 2014 Hontareva replaced Stepan Kubiv as Governor of the National Bank of Ukraine. Hontareva is the first female to lead the bank.

For the time of Hontareva's work in the NBU, the hryvnia depreciated almost three times.

International financial institutions representatives state that the biggest reform achievement in Ukraine under Hontareva's rule has been the clean-up of the banking system with the grand finale of the nationalization of Privatbank.

Hontareva had reduced the size of the central bank bureaucracy from 12,000 to 5,000. She had let the country's currency float, which stabilized the economy. And, above all, in an effort to clean up the ailing banking sector, she had named 87 banks insolvent with about 60 percent of the sector's assets. According to the EBRD managing director (Eastern Europe and the Caucasus) Francis Malige, Hontareva is the No. 1 changemaker in Ukraine.

Hontareva has a good reputation among professionals as the Ukrainian central bank for the first time started to act independently from the interests of oligarchs and politicians. She fulfilled modern monetary policy similar to the policy of the European Central Bank or the United States’ Federal Reserve System moving to targeting inflation instead of targeting exchange rates. On the contrary, the predecessors of Hontareva on firsthand wanted to maintain the stable national currency exchange rate.

On 10 April 2017, Hontareva submitted her resignation. On 11 May 2017, while still not formally dismissed, she left the bank and Deputy Governor Yakiv Smoliy took over her duties.

“My mission is complete. First, the country has moved to a flexible exchange rate and implemented a new monetary policy of inflation targeting. Secondly, the banking system has been cleansed of insolvent banks, and its future resilience strengthened. Thirdly, the National Bank has been completely transformed, all the processes have been reset and today our central bank is a strong modern organization,” Valeriia Hontareva concluded during her resignation announcement.

During her nearly three years in office, the National Bank headed by Valeriia Hontareva has succeeded in stabilizing the macroeconomic situation, fundamentally transforming the banking sector landscape and building a modern central bank despite war and political instability, deep economic crisis, and empty government treasury.

=== London School of Economics ===
On 1 October 2018, Hontareva became a member of the Institute of Global Affairs, an initiative of the London School of Economics.

== Notes ==
Business positions
Preceded by Stepan Kubiv	Governor of the National Bank of Ukraine; 2014-2017	Succeeded by Yakiv Smoliy (acting)
