= Mshanets, Bila rural hromada, Ternopil Raion, Ternopil Oblast =

Rural locality in Ternopil Oblast, Ukraine

Mshanets Мшанець
- Village
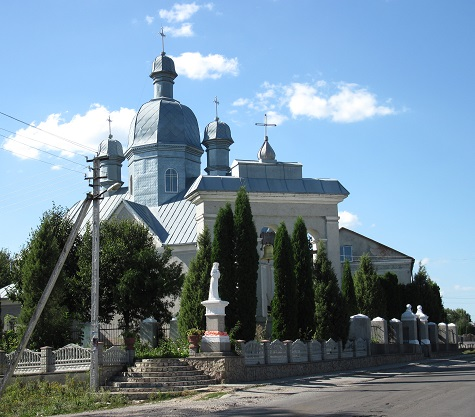
- Temple of St. Archangel Michael

- Location within Ukraine Location within Ternopil Oblast
- Coordinates: 49°45′08″N 25°28′31″E
- Country: Ukraine
- Oblast: Ternopil Oblast
- District: Ternopil Raion

Area
  - Total: 1,625 km^{2} (627 sq mi)
- Elevation: 355 m (1,165 ft)

Population
  - Total: 728
  - Density: 0.448/km^{2} (1.16/sq mi)
- Time zone: UTC+2 (EET)
  - Summer (DST): UTC+3 (EEST)
- Postal code: 47235
- Area code: +380 3540

Mshanets (Ukrainian: Мшане́ць) is a village in Ternopil Raion, Ternopil Oblast of Western Ukraine. From 1975 to 1990 the village was called Peremozhne. It belongs to Bila rural hromada, one of the hromadas of Ukraine. The area of the village is 1,625 km^{2} and it has a population of 728 people. The local government is the Mshanetska village council, and includes the villages Ditkivtsi, Homivka and farmstead Manyuky.

== Geography ==
The village is located on the shores of the Verkhovynka river (it is the left tributary of the Seret River) at an altitude of 355 metres (1,160 ft) above sea level, which is in eastern of Zboriv Raion. It is situated 26 kilometres (16 mi) from the regional center Ternopil, 40 kilometres (25 mi) from the district center Zboriv (through urban-type settlement Zaliztsi) and 52 kilometres (32 mi) from Brody.

== History ==
Mshanets village was first mentioned in 1463. In 1518, the village became the property of Konstanty Ostrogski, a magnate of the Grand Duchy of Lithuania; later, it became a Grand Hetman of Lithuania.
The village was largely destroyed at the time of the First World War. The whole village was evacuated and houses were destroyed. People departed to different parts of Ukraine.

Until 18 July 2020, Mshanets belonged to Zboriv Raion. The raion was abolished in July 2020 as part of the administrative reform of Ukraine, which reduced the number of raions of Ternopil Oblast to three. The area of Zboriv Raion was merged into Ternopil Raion.

== Churches and religion ==
Mshanetska Parish of the Ukrainian Greek Catholic Church, Temple of St. Archangel Michael (1794, stone, reconstructed).

== Notable people ==
- Stepan Kubiv (1962–2026), Ukrainian economist and politician

== External links/sources ==
- weather.in.ua/Zborivs'kyi District/Mshanets'
- Прадідівська слава/Зборівський район/Мшанець (in Ukrainian)
