= Volodymyr Stelmakh =

Ukrainian banker, economist, and politician

Hero of Ukraine Volodymyr Stelmakh
- Володимир Стельмах
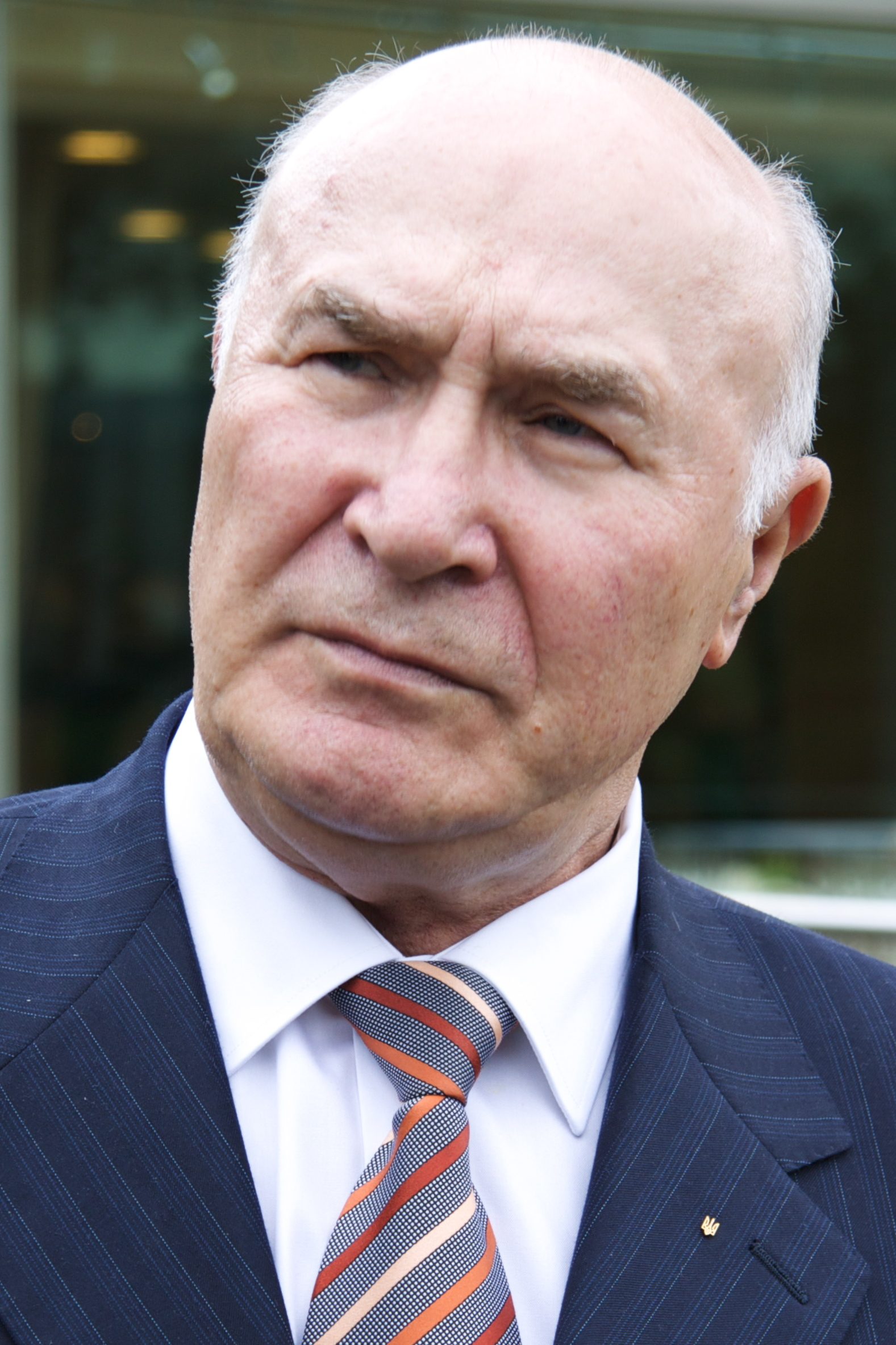
- Stelmakh in 2009

Governor of the National Bank of Ukraine
- In office 16 December 2004 – 23 December 2010
- President: Leonid Kuchma; Viktor Yushchenko; Viktor Yanukovych
- Preceded by: Serhiy Tihipko
- Succeeded by: Serhiy Arbuzov
- In office 21 January 2000 – 17 December 2002
- President: Leonid Kuchma
- Preceded by: Viktor Yushchenko
- Succeeded by: Serhiy Tihipko

Personal details
- Born: 18 January 1939 (age 87) Oleksandrivka, Ukrainian SSR, Soviet Union (now Ukraine)
- Awards: Hero of Ukraine
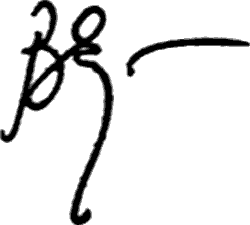
- Signature

Volodymyr Semenovych Stelmakh (Ukrainian: Володи́мир Семе́нович Сте́льмах; born 18 January 1939) is a Ukrainian banker, economist, and politician who served as Governor of the National Bank of Ukraine from on two occasions, from 2000 to 2002 and from 2004 to 2010.

== Early life ==
Stelmakh was born on 18 January 1939 in the village of Oleksandrivka, which was then part of the Ukrainian SSR in the Soviet Union. His father, Semen, was killed during World War II, so he was raised by his mother Mariia. He was initially a student at a mining-industrial school in Kostiantynivka, but then worked on a collective farm in his hometown and as a locomotive operator. He eventually re-entered school, and in 1962 graduated from the Lviv Accounting and Credit Technical School, and later at the Kyiv National Economic University in 1967.

== Career ==
=== In the USSR ===
After graduation, he worked as an economist in the Sumy regional office of the State Bank of the USSR. From 1969 to 1977 he headed the departments for machine-building and agricultural crediting for the bank in Moscow. There, he also attended the Moscow Finance Institute, where he specialized in international economic relations. Upon graduation from the institute, from 1979 to 1981 he worked as Deputy Head of the Department for Foreign banking Credits within the USSR Bank for Foreign Trade. He was then sent to be an adviser to the head of the National Bank of Cuba, Raúl León Torrás, until 1986. Upon his return to the USSR in 1986, he took on senior positions within the national bank, rising to First Deputy Head of the credit-settlement methodology department.

=== In Ukraine ===
Following the collapse of the Soviet Union, he became a board member of the National Bank of Ukraine (NBU), and was Head of Main Directorate of Banking Technology Methodology. From 1993 to 2000 he was then First Deputyy Chairman of the NBU board, and briefly for two months from December 1999 to January 2000 was its acting chairman. Following his first term as Governor, he was chairman of the supervisory board of Brokbusinessbank.

==== Governor of the National Bank of Ukraine ====
From January 2000 to January 2003, Stelmakh served his first turn as Governor of the National Bank of Ukraine (NBU). According to Stelmakh, one of the main initiators of his resignation was Prime Minister Anatoliy Kinakh, who wanted to cover the lack of revenue in the 2002 state budget by printing more money. As head of the NBU, he stated he was categorically against such a step, as it would lead to a rise in inflation.

On 16 December 2004, Stelmakh was reppointed the Governor of the NBU.

During the 2007 Ukrainian parliamentary election, Stelmakh was placed number 28 on the electoral list of Our Ukraine–People's Self-Defense Bloc. However, Stelmakh refused the deputy mandate in favor of his post at the NBU.

== Honours and awards ==
In February 2010 he was awarded the Order of Yaroslav the Wise (second degree).

Government offices
Preceded by Viktor Yushchenko	Governor of the National Bank of Ukraine; 2000–2002	Succeeded by Serhiy Tihipko
Preceded by Serhiy Tihipko	Governor of the National Bank of Ukraine; 2004–2010	Succeeded by Serhiy Arbuzov
