= Ihor Sorkin =

Ukrainian banker

- Ігор Соркін
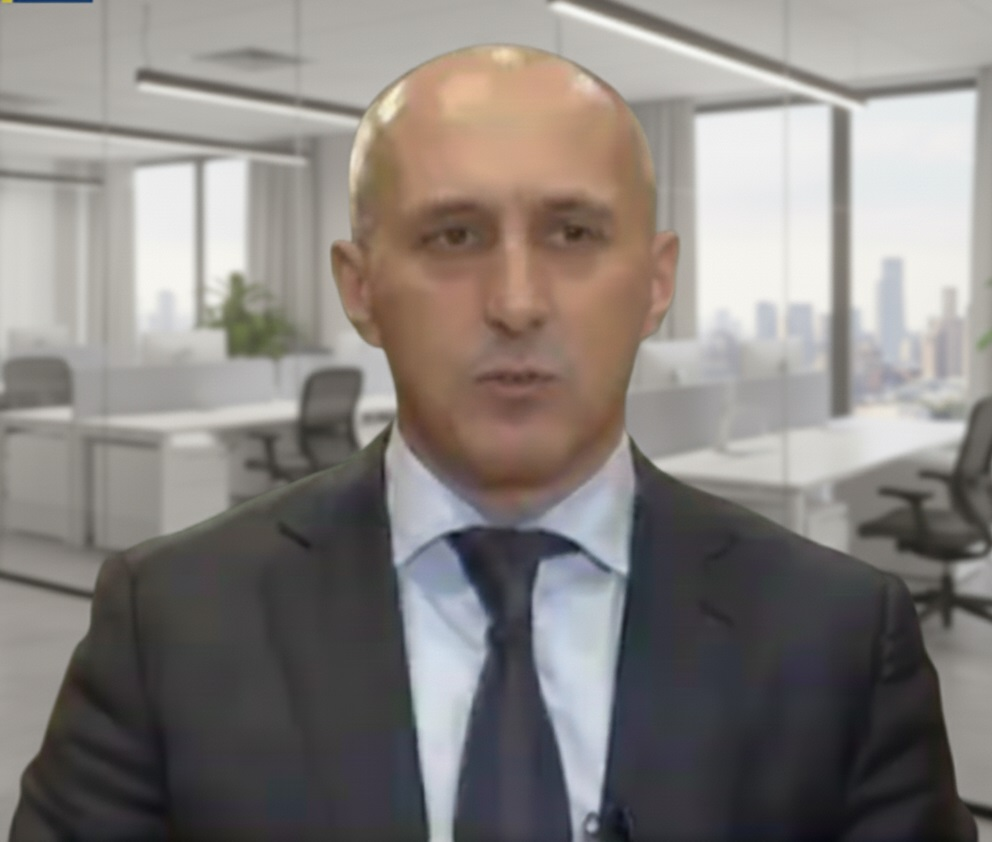

8th Chairman of the National Bank of Ukraine
- In office January 11, 2013 – February 24, 2014
- Prime Minister: Mykola Azarov
- Preceded by: Serhiy Arbuzov
- Succeeded by: Stepan Kubiv

Personal details
- Born: 3 March 1967 (age 59) Donetsk, Donetsk Oblast, Ukraine SSR, Soviet Union
- Spouse: Anzhela
- Education: Donetsk National University
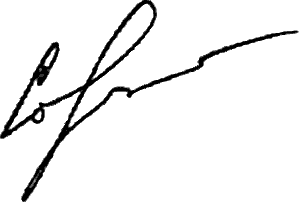
- Signature

Ihor Vyacheslavovych Sorkin (Ukrainian: Ігор В'ячеславович Соркін) is a Ukrainian banker who was the Chairman of the National Bank of Ukraine between 2013 and 2014.

== Early years and military service ==
Igor Sorkin was born on March 3, 1967, in Donetsk. He graduated from high school in 1984. From 1988 to 1996, he served in the Soviet Army and the National Guard of Ukraine (commander landing assault platoon, reconnaissance battalion and regimental intelligence chief of the National Guard).

== Education ==
Ihor Sorkin has three higher education degrees:

- in 1988, he graduated from the Baku Higher Combined-Arms Command School with a degree in engineering.
- in 1998, he graduated from Donetsk State University with a degree in law.
- in 2006, he graduated from Donetsk National University with a degree in banking.

== Career ==
Since 1996, he has been working in the system of the National Bank of Ukraine (economist of 1st category, leading economist, chief economist at the department, head of the sector, deputy head of the department, and since 2001, head of Banking Supervision department in Office of the National Bank of Ukraine in the Donetsk Oblast)

In July 2010, he was appointed deputy governor of the National Bank of Ukraine

Since January 17, 2011, he was the 3d ranking civil servant.

In December 2012, he became acting governor of the National Bank of Ukraine and on January 11, 2013, he was appointed governor of the National Bank of Ukraine by Verkhovna Rada of Ukraine after being proposed by President Viktor Yanukovych.

Since January 18, 2013, he has been a member of National Security and Defense Council of Ukraine.

On 24 February 2014, just after the "Maidan revolution", the Verkhovna Rada dismissed Sorkin as governor of the National Bank of Ukraine.

On 17 March 2014, the Kyiv Pechersky District Court approved the arrest Sorkin in absentia on suspicion of embezzlement.

== Family ==
Sorkin's parents live in Moscow, Russia. Where his father Vyacheslav Sorkin is an executive of Gazprom.

Sorkin's wife Anzhela is a former executive of UkrBusinessBank. The head of the board of this bank was Sorkins predecessor as national bank governor Serhiy Arbuzov; while UkrBusinessBank was owned by Oleksandr Yanukovych who is the son of president Viktor Yanukovych at the time of the appointment of Sorkin as national bank governor.

== Recognition ==
Sorkin was named Merited Economist of Ukraine on December 1, 2011.

Business positions
Preceded by Serhiy Arbuzov	Governor of the National Bank of Ukraine; 2013-2014	Succeeded by Stepan Kubiv
