= Stepan Kubiv =

Ukrainian politician (1962–2026)

- Степан Кубів
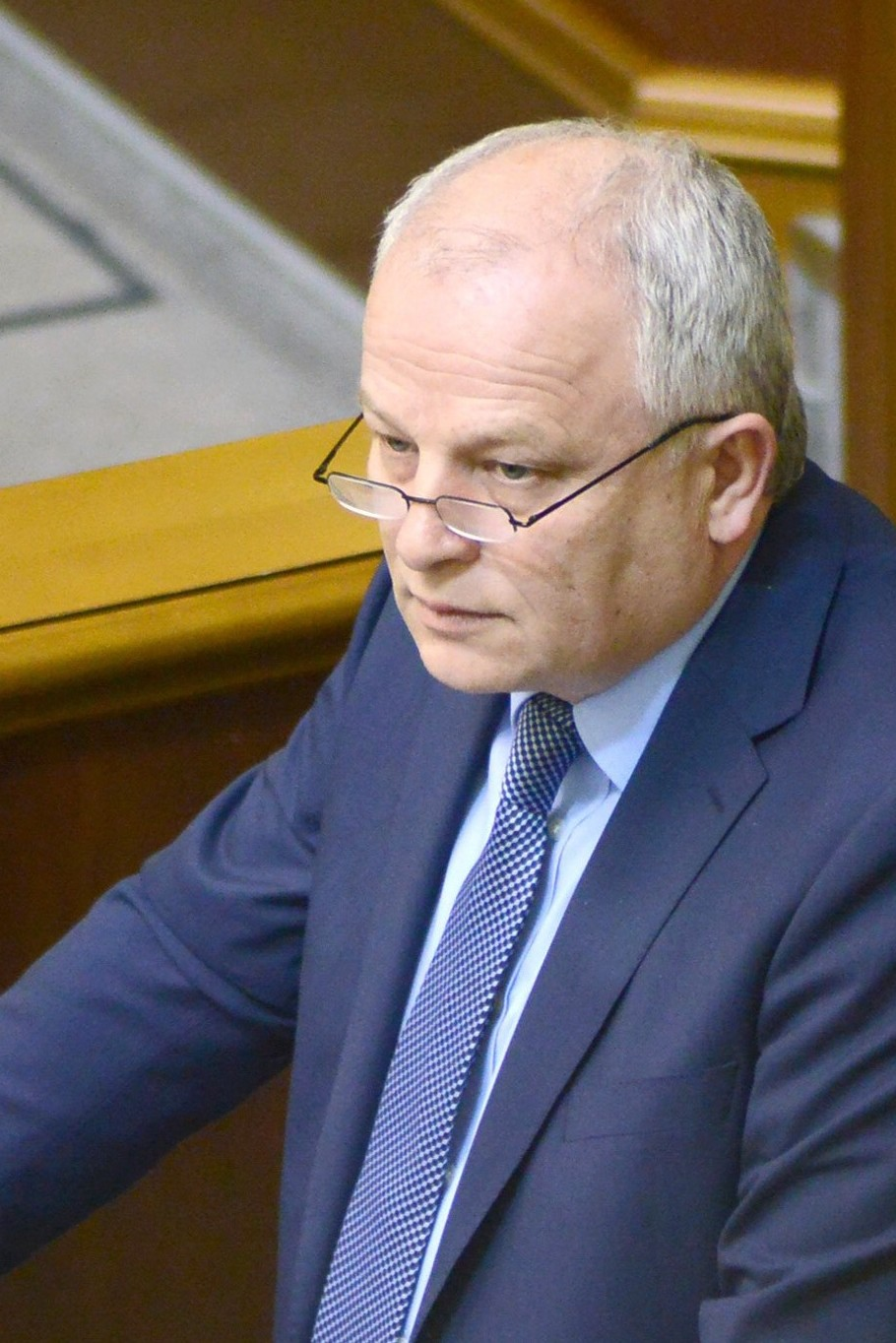
- Kubiv in 2015

First Deputy Prime Minister of Ukraine
- In office 14 April 2016 – 29 August 2019
- Prime Minister: Volodymyr Groysman
- Preceded by: Vitaliy Yarema
- Succeeded by: Oleksiy Liubchenko

Minister of Economic Development and Trade
- In office 14 April 2016 – 29 August 2019
- Preceded by: Aivaras Abromavičius
- Succeeded by: Tymofiy Mylovanov

9th Chairman of the National Bank of Ukraine
- In office 24 February 2014 – 19 June 2014
- Preceded by: Ihor Sorkin
- Succeeded by: Valeriia Hontareva

Personal details
- Born: 19 March 1962 Mshanets, Ternopil Oblast, Ukrainian SSR, Soviet Union (now Ukraine)
- Died: 18 May 2026 (aged 64)
- Party: European Solidarity
- Other political affiliations: Batkivshchyna; Front for Change; Our Ukraine
- Education: Lviv University; Lviv Polytechnic
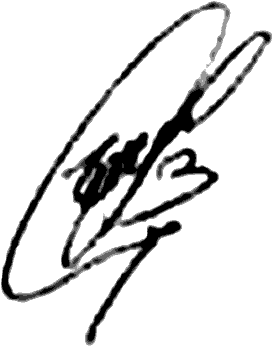
- Signature

Stepan Ivanovych Kubiv (Ukrainian: Степан Іванович Кубів; 19 March 1962 – 18 May 2026) was a Ukrainian politician who was the First Vice Prime Minister of Ukraine and simultaneously Minister of Economic Development and Trade of Ukraine from April 2016 to August 2019. He had previously served as chairman of the National Bank of Ukraine.

== Biography ==
=== Early life and career ===
Stepan Kubiv was born on 19 March 1962 in the village of Mshanets, Ternopil Oblast. He started his education at a village school. In 1984 he graduated from the mathematics faculty of Lviv University. Between 1983 and 1988 Kubiv worked as a researcher at the University. During the late 1980s he worked in the Komsomol structures, organizing scientific and technical activities of the youth, creating student squads and working at the university's council of scientists. During the 1990s Kubiv managed the "Student Lviv" youth organization.

In 1994 Kubiv started working as an economist at the Western Ukrainian Commercial Bank, and in 1997 became its chairman. Between 2000 and 2008 he worked as CEO of Kredobank. In 2002 Kubiv graduated from Lviv Polytechnic, specializing in economy and management, and in 2006 defended his PhD thesis in economics. Starting from 2008, he worked as an associate professor of marketing and logistics at the National University "Lviv Polytechnic".

=== Political career ===
==== People's deputy ====
Between 2006 and 2012 Kubiv served as a deputy of Lviv Oblast Council as member of Our Ukraine and Front of Change. During that period he was appointed deputy head of the council's budgetary commission. In October 2012 Kubiv was elected people's deputy of Ukraine from Batkivshchyna. On 12 December 2012 he was officially declared member of Verkhovna Rada of 7th convocation.

During the 2013-2014 Revolution of Dignity Kubiv served as commandant of the Trade Unions Building and joined the National Resistance Headquarters.

==== Head of National Bank ====
On 24 February 2014 Kubiv was appointed chairman of the National Bank of Ukraine, and on 28 February 2014 became member of the National Security Council. On 4 March 2014 his powers as people's deputy were terminated on his own request.

Kubiv's tenure as head of National Bank coincided with a period of economic and political crisis. Under his leadership, Ukraine adopted a policy of flexible exchange rates and inflation targeting. As a result of rapid devaluation of hryvnia, Kubiv's management became an object of criticism from experts and general society. On 19 June 2014 Kubiv was replaced as chairman of the National Bank of Ukraine by Valeriia Hontareva. At the time he was considered a candidate to become the next chairman of Lviv Regional State Administration.

==== Return to parliament and government posts ====
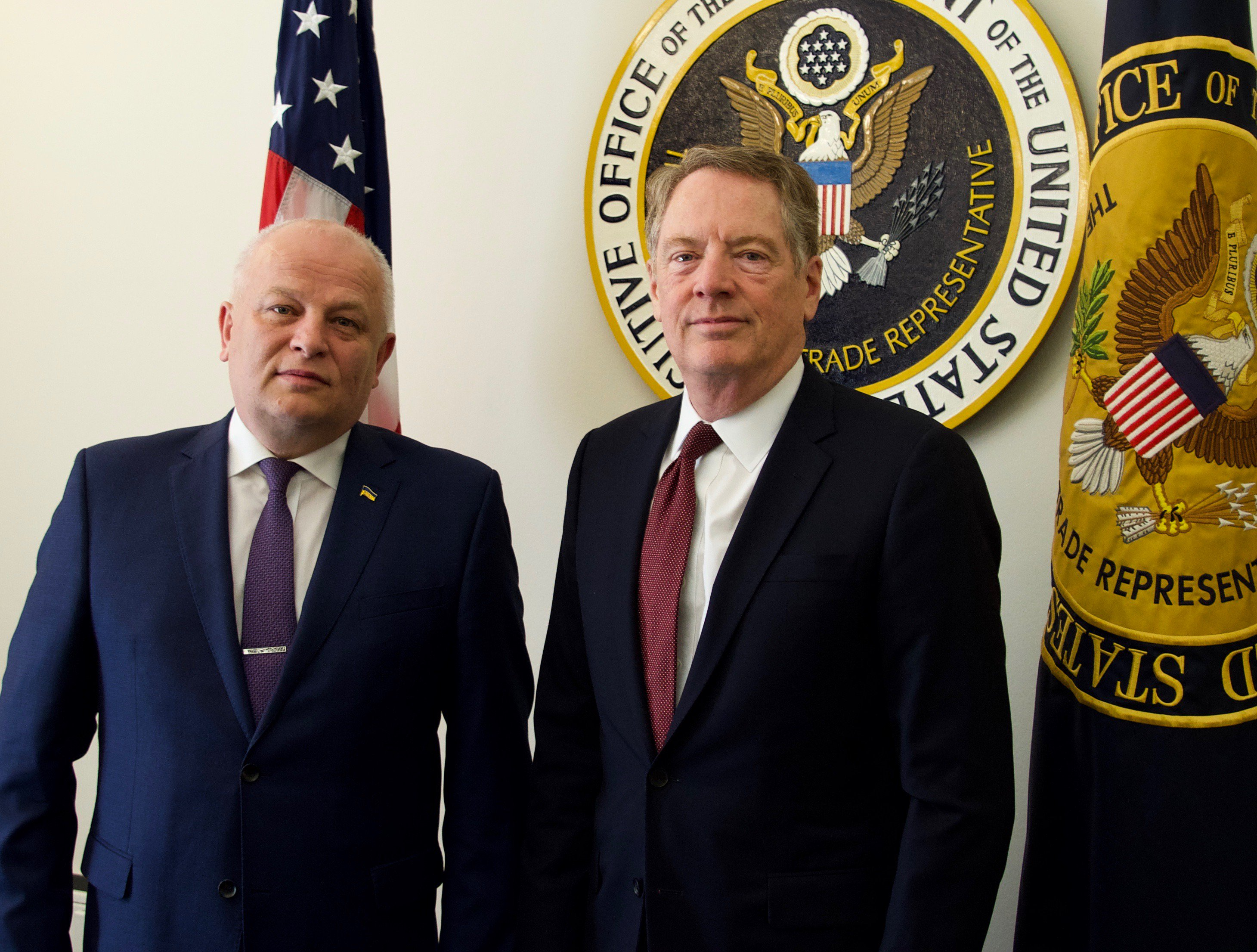
Kubiv meeting Robert Lighthizer during his tenure as minister

In the 2014 Ukrainian parliamentary election Kubiv was re-elected into parliament after placing 59th on the electoral list of Petro Poroshenko Bloc.

From April 2016 to August 2019 Kubiv was the First Vice Prime Minister of Ukraine and simultaneously Minister of Economic Development and Trade of Ukraine.

In the parliamentary elections of 2019, Kubiv was elected as MP from European Solidarity, No. 12 on the party list. He was a member of the Verkhovna Rada of Ukraine Committee on Economic Development and of the Ukrainian part of the interparliamentary assembly of the Verkhovna Rada of Ukraine, Parliament of Georgia, Parliament of the Republic of Moldova.

In 2024 the Ministry of Internal Affairs of Russia put Kubiv on its wanted list on accusation of him supposedly financing the "Anti-terrorist operation".

== Personal life ==
For 2019, Kubiv declared a salary of ₴646,216 and a 2012 Audi Q5 car.

In addition to his political and business positions, Kubiv served as head of Vasyl Stus Memorial Society and participated in supervisory boards of several universities in Lviv.

== Death ==
Kubiv died on 18 May 2026, at the age of 64. According to reports from colleagues, his death was caused by a blood clot. Kubiv's burial is planned to take place at the Lychakiv Cemetery.

== Awards ==
Order "For merits" of III class.

Government offices
Preceded by Ihor Sorkin	Governor of the National Bank of Ukraine; 2014	Succeeded by Valeriia Hontareva
