= Serhiy Arbuzov =

Ukrainian politician (born 1976)

- Сергій Арбузов (Ukrainian); Сергей Арбузов (Russian)
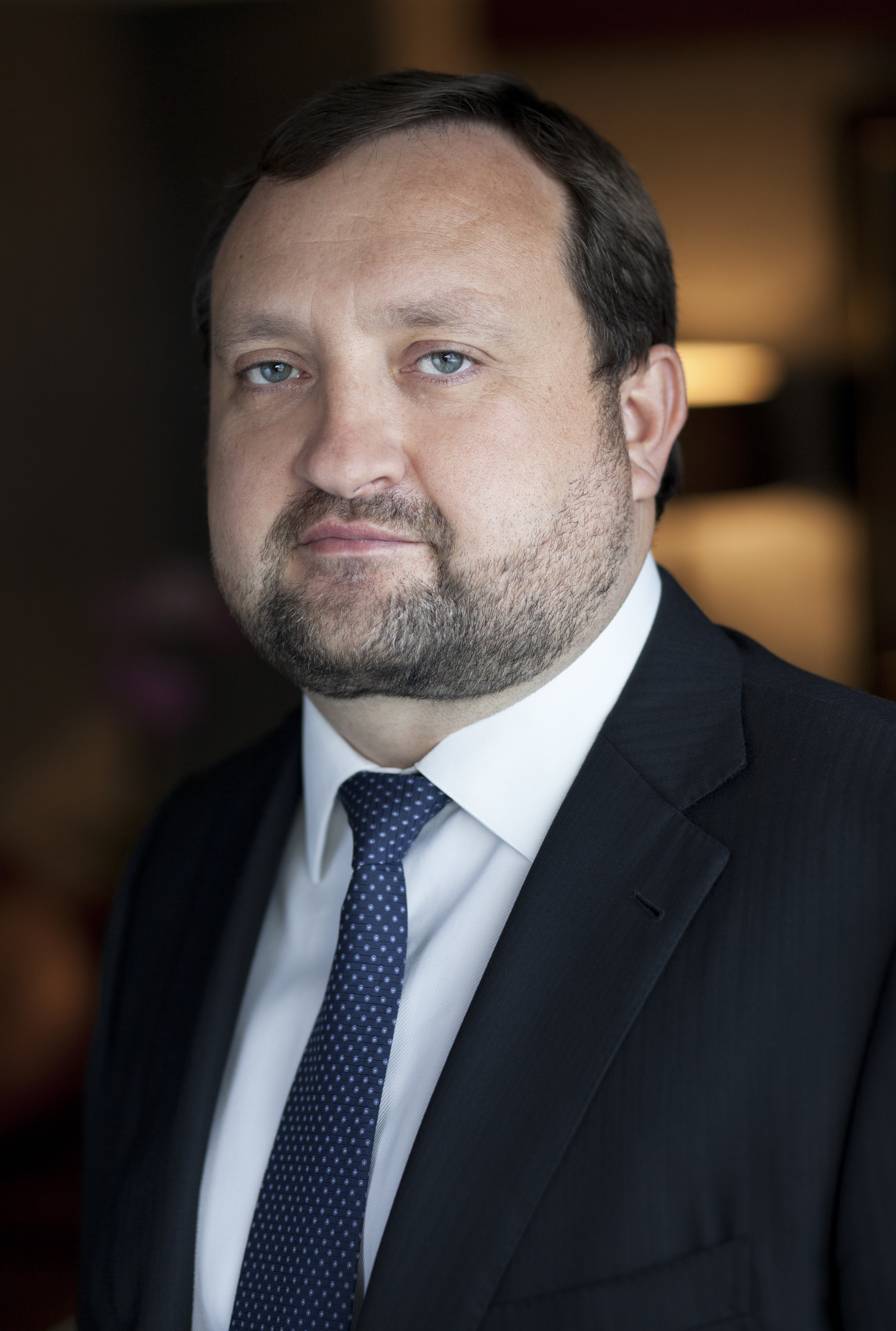
- Arbuzov in 2012

Member of the State Duma
- Incumbent
- Assumed office 30 September 2026
- Constituency: Party list

Acting Prime Minister of Ukraine
- In office 28 January 2014 – 22 February 2014
- President: Viktor Yanukovych
- Preceded by: Mykola Azarov
- Succeeded by: Oleksandr Turchynov (acting)

First Deputy Prime Minister of Ukraine
- In office 24 December 2012 – 28 January 2014
- Prime Minister: Mykola Azarov
- Preceded by: Valeriy Khoroshkovskyi
- Succeeded by: Vitaliy Yarema

Governor of the National Bank of Ukraine
- In office 23 December 2010 – 24 December 2012
- President: Viktor Yanukovych
- Preceded by: Volodymyr Stelmakh
- Succeeded by: Ihor Sorkin

Personal details
- Born: 24 March 1976 (age 50) Donetsk, Ukrainian SSR, Soviet Union
- Party: A Just Russia (2026–present)
- Other political affiliations: Our Ukraine (2005–2010); Party of Regions (2010–2014)
- Spouse: Iryna Arbuzova
- Education: Donetsk National University
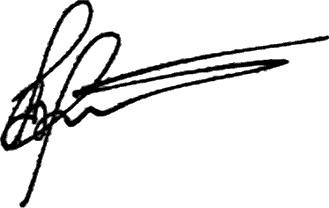
- Signature

Serhiy Hennadiyovych Arbuzov (Ukrainian: Сергій Геннадійович Арбузов, Russian: Сергей Геннадьевич Арбузов, romanized: Sergey Gennadyevich Arbuzov; born 24 March 1976) is a Russian and former Ukrainian politician and banker, who briefly served as acting prime minister of Ukraine from 28 January to 22 February 2014, following the resignation of Mykola Azarov amidst the escalating Euromaidan movement. He previously served as First Vice Prime Minister of Ukraine from 24 December 2012 to 28 January 2014. On 27 February 2014, in the aftermath of the Revolution of Dignity, Arbuzov was dismissed, and Arseniy Yatsenyuk was elected as the new prime minister.

After the Revolution of Dignity, Arbuzov fled to Russia, where he resides in the Rublevka area in Moscow in exile and is wanted by the General Prosecutor of Ukraine. Arbuzov's defense insists that it is political persecution.

Arbuzov is the former chairman of the National Bank of Ukraine and was the youngest chairman of the National Bank in Europe at the time of his appointment as First Vice Prime Minister. In the 2000s, Arbuzov worked as a director of several leading Ukrainian banks, including Privatbank and Ukreximbank.

== Biography ==
Arbuzov was born in Donetsk. He graduated from the Donetsk State University, having specialized in finance and credit and qualified as an economist. At the start of his professional career, Arbuzov worked as an administration chairman of Privatbank in Donetsk and a director of Privatbank in Kostyantynivka. In 2003-10 he was a director of the Ukrainian Business Bank, previously known as Donechyna.

In 2005, Arbuzov became a member of Our Ukraine, and in 2006 he unsuccessfully ran for the Donetsk Regional Council as a member of the party. Upon his appointment to the National Bank of Ukraine, his political affiliation became uncertain.

In 2010, Arbuzov was appointed chairman of the Supervising Council of UkrEximBank, and in September 2010, he became a deputy chairman of the National Bank of Ukraine. On 21 December 2010, the President of Ukraine sent a petition to the parliament to replace Volodymyr Stelmakh with Arbuzov. On 23 December 2010 the Verkhovna Rada approved the petition, making Arbuzov the youngest chairman of a state central bank. After the appointment, the older son of the President, Oleksandr Yanukovych, bought the All-Ukrainian Bank of Development from Arbuzov.

In May 2012, the Ukrainian magazine Focus said that Arbuzov has the highest salary among Ukrainian civil servants – ₴140,000 per month (approximately $18,000). In the same year, another Ukrainian magazine, Korrespondent, placed him among the thirty most influential people in the country.

As the chairman of the National Bank, he was best remembered for a set of measures directed at maintaining the stability of the hryvnia. In particular, it refers to the imposition of obligation for importers to sell 50% of their foreign currency revenue at the interbank currency market, as well as the reduction of the term of repayment of currency revenue to 90 days. Alongside this, a slowdown of the inflation rate was secured.

On 24 December 2012, Viktor Yanukovych appointed Arbuzov the First Vice Prime Minister of Ukraine by presidential decree.

As the First Vice Prime Minister, Arbuzov was engaged in European integration issues. In October and December 2013, Arbuzov held a series of meetings with the European Commissioner for Enlargement and European Neighbourhood Policy Štefan Füle in Brussels, where a series of consultations were held on the implementation of the Association Agreement with the European Union. Arbuzov initiated the preparation of the road map document, in which the Association Agreement process was set out on a phased basis.

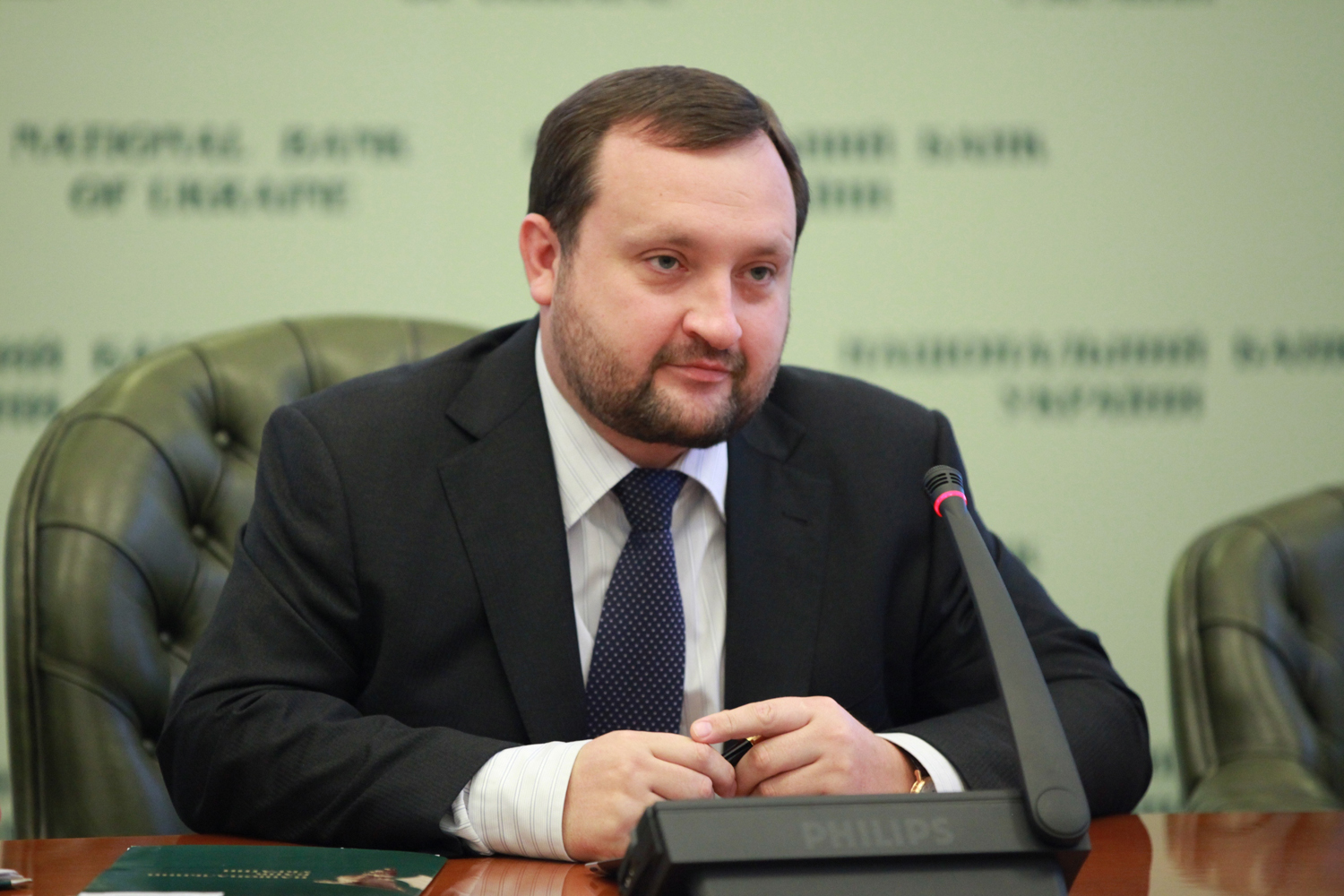
Arbuzov as governor of the National Bank of Ukraine, 2012

While in Government, Arbuzov initiated a series of reforms in the taxation system, streamlining customs procedures, property rights protection, deregulation of business operations, and value enhancement, among other things.

After weeks of Euromaidan protests and violent unrest, Prime Minister Mykola Azarov offered his letter of resignation on 28 January 2014. President Yanukovych accepted the resignation the same day and signed a decree dismissing the second Azarov Government, which would not take effect until the Verkhovna Rada approved a new Cabinet. The second Azarov Government continued as a caretaker government, And Arbuzov replaced Azarov as Prime Minister of Ukraine. On 29 March 2014, during a party congress, Arbuzov was expelled from the Party of Regions. Despite trying to bring about a resolution to the dispute between authorities and opposition, Arbuzov was bound to leave the country after the change of regime. Arbuzov is wanted by the General Prosecutor of Ukraine and is believed to be hiding in Russia as of 2015.

The new Ukrainian government incriminated Arbuzov in the theft of ₴120 million of profit from the BTB channel, which he had initiated. According to Igor Fomin, Arbuzov's attorney for the defense, the proceedings should be ceased because "the channel has not made a profit for the whole period of its existence". Thus, according to defense, there is an absence of elements of the crime. Later General Prosecutor's Office also confirmed it.

On 11 September 2015, the Prosecutor General's Office of Ukraine announced the arrest of non-resident companies accounts affiliated with Arbuzov in the national banking institutions totaling US$49.51 million, among which there were domestic government bonds with a nominal value of 1.021 billion US dollars and ₴1.495 billion.

Later, a representative of the PGO specified that 49.3 million US dollars had been arrested by a court in Latvia. No further information about the arrest of domestic government bonds has been provided up to the present moment.

But in December 2015, the defense of Arbuzov collected and released the official responses of the Latvian government agencies. Thus, according to the Information Center of the Ministry of Internal Affairs of Latvia, "there is no information about criminal proceedings initiated against Serhiy Arbuzov." Latvian grand jury of officers of justice also denied that there are any cases in proceedings records in which Arbuzov could be a creditor or debtor. Given this, according to Sergei Kovalyov, a lawyer of Arbuzov, the statement of the Prosecutor General's Office of Ukraine on the alleged arrest of $49.3 million in Arbuzov's accounts by the Latvian law enforcement agencies is not valid. The Prosecutor General's Office of Ukraine has not yet been able to confirm any of the accusations against Arbuzov since he resigned from the post of acting prime minister of Ukraine.

Arbuzov does not have an Identification Number of a Physical Person, having refused one for religious reasons. Instead, Arbuzov uses his passport number as the legal alternative.

In January 2015, Arbuzov and an experts group from the Association "Centre for Research into Economic and Sociocultural Upward Enhancement of CIS Countries, Central and Eastern Europe" addressed political and public figures of the West and Russia with the initiative to create the so-called "Coalition of intellect". It was noted in an open letter that the "Ukrainian crisis" had threatened all the progress that had been achieved in the development of the European security system over the previous 25 years. Instead of strengthening stability in the region, the parties of the conflict undermine cooperation and unleash a new arms race. "We need the intervention of the international community, the creation of a broad "Coalition of intellect", coalition for de-escalation. With its help, we could find a way out of the situation based on a broad civilized approach, but not a limited geopolitical one", – said ex-prime minister in his letter.

In 2025, the Ukrainian government imposed sanctions against Arbuzov.

In July 2026, Arbuzov was nominated as a candidate for the 2026 Russian legislative election on the list of A Just Russia party.

Government offices
Preceded by Volodymyr Stelmakh	Governor of the National Bank of Ukraine; 2010–2012	Succeeded by Ihor Sorkin
Political offices
Preceded by Valeriy Khoroshkovskyi	Deputy Prime Minister of Ukraine; 2012–2014	Succeeded by Vitaliy Yarema
Preceded by Mykola Azarov	Prime Minister of Ukraine; Acting; 2014	Succeeded by Oleksandr Turchynov; Acting
