= Verbovets, Ternopil Oblast =

Rural locality in Ternopil Oblast, Ukraine

Verbovets Вербовець
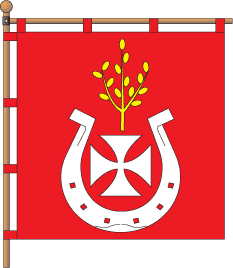
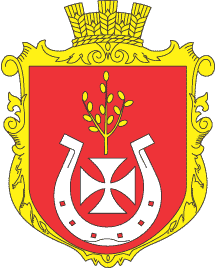
- Flag Coat of arms

- Location in Ternopil Oblast
- Coordinates: 49°48′38″N 25°53′53″E
- Country: Ukraine
- Oblast: Ternopil Oblast
- Raion: Kremenets Raion
- Hromada: Lanivtsi urban hromada
- Time zone: UTC+2 (EET)
  - Summer (DST): UTC+3 (EEST)
- Postal code: 47430

Verbovets (Ukrainian: Вербовець) is a village in the Lanivtsi urban hromada of the Kremenets Raion of Ternopil Oblast in Ukraine.

== History ==
The first written mention of the village was in 1463.

After the liquidation of the Lanivtsi Raion on 19 July 2020, the village became part of the Kremenets Raion.

== Religion ==
- Saint Nicholas church (1818, brick).

== Notable residents ==
- Yakiv Smolii (born 1961), Ukrainian economist and banker

== Sources ==
- "Wierzbowiec, 1.) wś, powiat krzemieniecki". Geographical Dictionary of the Kingdom of Poland (in Polish). 13. Warszawa: Kasa im. Józefa Mianowskiego. 1893. p. 403.
- "Wierzbowiec, wś, powiat krzemieniecki". Geographical Dictionary of the Kingdom of Poland (in Polish). p. 687.
