= Viktor Yushchenko =

President of Ukraine from 2005 to 2010

- Віктор Ющенко
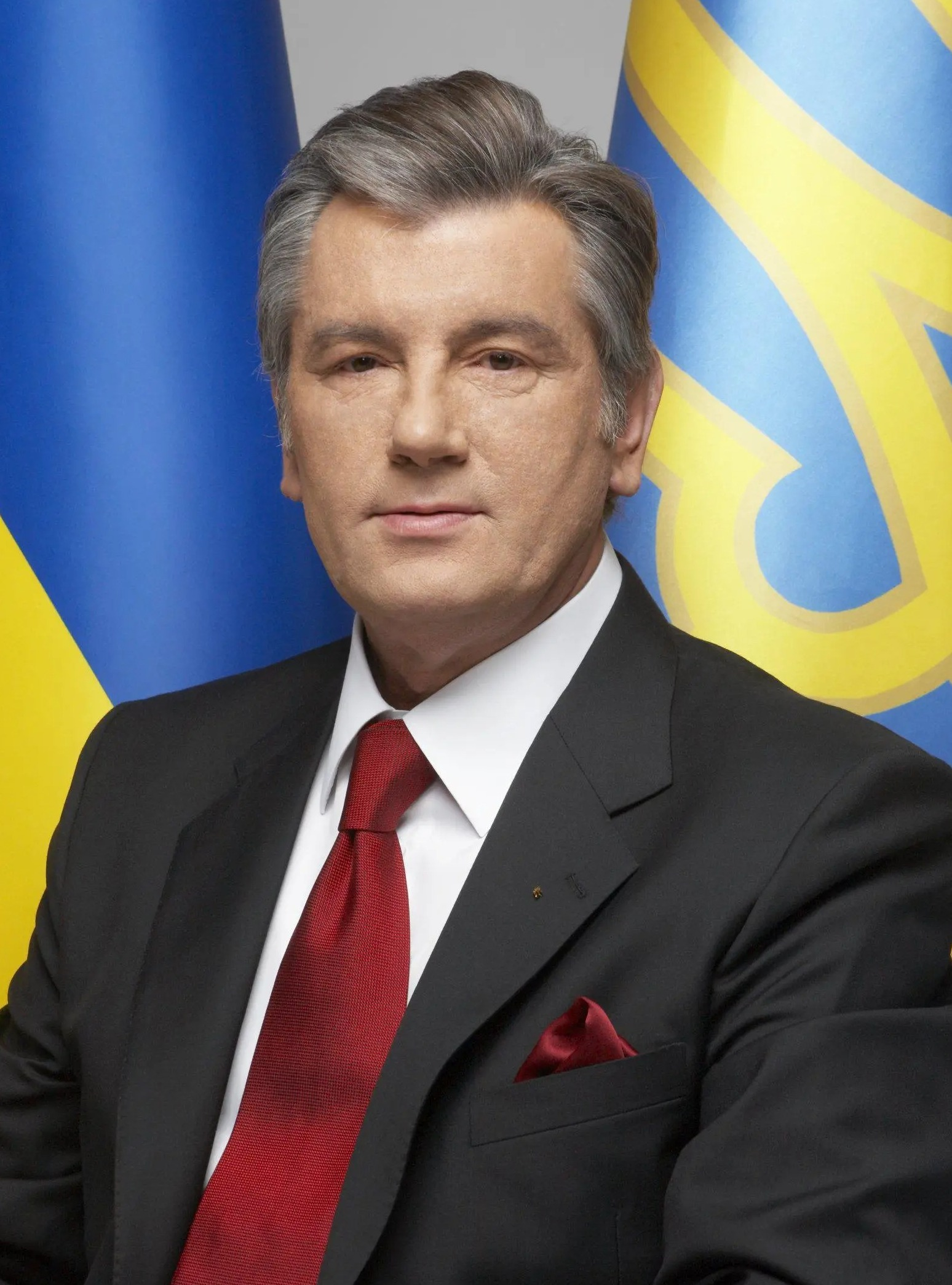
- Official portrait, 2008

3rd President of Ukraine
- In office 23 January 2005 – 25 February 2010
- Prime Minister: Mykola Azarov (acting); Yulia Tymoshenko; Yuriy Yekhanurov; Viktor Yanukovych; Yulia Tymoshenko
- Preceded by: Leonid Kuchma
- Succeeded by: Viktor Yanukovych

7th Prime Minister of Ukraine
- In office 22 December 1999 – 29 May 2001
- President: Leonid Kuchma
- Deputy: Yuriy Yekhanurov
- Preceded by: Valeriy Pustovoitenko
- Succeeded by: Anatoliy Kinakh

Governor of the National Bank of Ukraine
- In office January 1993 – 22 December 1999
- Preceded by: Vadym Hetman
- Succeeded by: Volodymyr Stelmakh

People's Deputy of Ukraine
- In office 14 May 2002 – 23 January 2005
- Constituency: Our Ukraine Bloc, No. 1

Personal details
- Born: 23 February 1954 (age 72) Khoruzhivka, Ukrainian SSR, Soviet Union
- Party: Our Ukraine (2002–2003, 2005–present)
- Other political affiliations: Communist Party of Ukraine (1980–1991); Independent (1991–2002, 2004–2005)
- Spouses: Svitlana Kolisnyk (m. 1977, divorced) Kateryna Yushchenko (m. 1998)
- Children: 5
- Education: Ternopil National Economic University; Academy of Banking
- Website: www.razom.org.ua

Military service
- Allegiance: Soviet Union
- Branch/service: Soviet Border Troops
- Years of service: 1975–1976
- Rank: Captain
- Viktor Yushchenko's voice Yushchenko on association agreement negotiations between Ukraine and the European Union; Recorded 9 September 2008

Viktor Andriiovych Yushchenko (Ukrainian: Віктор Андрійович Ющенко, IPA: [ˈwiktor ɐnˈd⁽ʲ⁾r⁽ʲ⁾ijowɪtʃ ˈjuʃtʃenko]; born 23 February 1954) is a Ukrainian politician who was the third president of Ukraine from 23 January 2005 to 25 February 2010. He aimed to orient Ukraine towards the West, European Union, the G7 (then G8), and NATO.

Yushchenko's first career was in the banking industry. In 1993, he became governor of the National Bank of Ukraine, presiding over their response to hyperinflation and the introduction of a national currency. From 1999 to 2001 he was prime minister under President Leonid Kuchma. After his dismissal as prime minister, Yushchenko went into opposition to President Kuchma and founded Our Ukraine Bloc, which at the 2002 parliamentary election became Ukraine's most popular political force.

As an informal leader of the Ukrainian opposition coalition, he was one of the two main candidates in the 2004 Ukrainian presidential election, the other being Prime Minister Viktor Yanukovych. During the election campaign in late 2004, Yushchenko became the victim of an assassination attempt when he was poisoned with dioxin. He suffered disfigurement as a result of the poisoning, but survived. The runoff election in November 2004, won by Yanukovych, was marred by widespread accusations of election fraud, leading to the Orange Revolution and an order by the Ukrainian Supreme Court to repeat the vote. Yushchenko won the revote 52% to 44%.

Yushchenko's influence declined soon after he assumed the presidency, especially after falling out with his prime minister and leading political ally Yulia Tymoshenko, as did his and his party's popularity and electoral standing. The rest of his presidency was marked by infighting, legislative deadlock and coalition crises in 2007 and in 2008. He lost re-election to Yanukovych in the 2010 Ukrainian presidential election, finishing in fifth place in the first round with 5.5% of the vote. Yushchenko again led Our Ukraine in the 2012 parliamentary election, but they failed to win representation.

== Early life ==
Yushchenko was born on 23 February 1954, in Khoruzhivka, Sumy Oblast, Ukrainian SSR, Soviet Union, into a family of teachers. His father, Andriy Andriyovych Yushchenko (1919–1992) fought in the Second World War, was captured by German forces and imprisoned as a POW in a series of concentration camps in the German Reich, including Auschwitz-Birkenau. His father survived the ordeal, and after returning home taught English at a local school.

Viktor's mother, Varvara Tymofiyivna Yushchenko (1918–2005), taught physics and mathematics at the same school. The Sumy Oblast region where he was born is predominantly Ukrainian-speaking, and this differentiated him in later life from his political counterparts, for whom Russian was the mother tongue.

Yushchenko graduated from the Ternopil Finance and Economics Institute in 1975. He began work as an accountant, as a deputy to the chief accountant in a kolkhoz. From 1975 to 1976, he served as a conscript in the Transcaucasian Military District on the Soviet–Turkish border.

== Central banker ==
In 1976, Yushchenko began a career in banking. In 1983, he became the Deputy Director for Agricultural Credit at the Ukrainian Republican Office of the Soviet Union State Bank. From 1990 to 1993, he worked as vice-chairman and first vice-chairman of the JSC Agroindustrial Bank Ukraina. In 1993, he was appointed Governor of the National Bank of Ukraine (Ukraine's central bank). In 1997, Verkhovna Rada, the parliament of Ukraine, re-appointed him.

As a central banker, Yushchenko played an important part in the creation of Ukraine's national currency, the hryvnia, and the establishment of a modern regulatory system for commercial banking. He also successfully overcame a debilitating wave of hyper-inflation that hit the country—he brought inflation down from more than 10,000 percent to less than 10 percent—and managed to defend the value of the currency following the 1998 Russian financial crisis.

In 1998, he wrote a thesis entitled "The Development of Supply and Demand of Money in Ukraine" and defended it in the Ukrainian Academy of Banking. He thereby earned a doctorate in economics.

== Prime minister ==
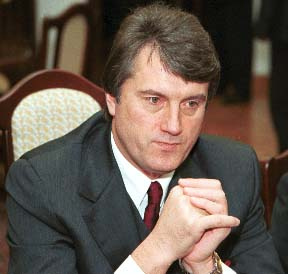
Yushchenko as prime minister visiting Poland in 2000

In December 1999, Ukrainian President Leonid Kuchma unexpectedly nominated Yushchenko to be the prime minister after the parliament failed by one vote to ratify the previous candidate, Valeriy Pustovoytenko.

Ukraine's economy improved during Yushchenko's cabinet service. However, his government, particularly Deputy Prime Minister Yulia Tymoshenko, soon became embroiled in a confrontation with influential leaders of the coal mining and natural gas industries. The conflict resulted in a no-confidence vote by the parliament on 26 April 2001, orchestrated by the Communist Party of Ukraine, who opposed Yushchenko's economic policies, and by centrist groups associated with the country's powerful "oligarchs." The vote passed 263 to 187 and resulted in Yushchenko's removal from office.

== "Our Ukraine" leader ==
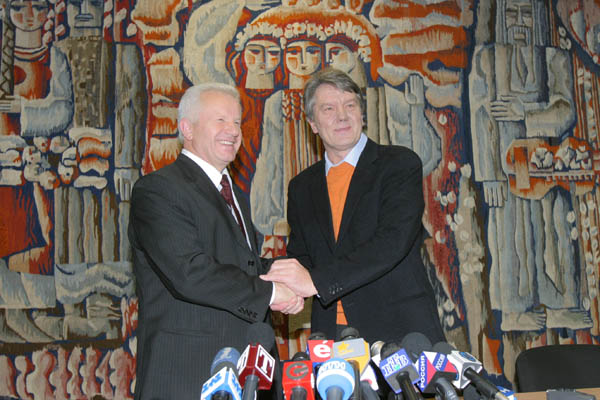
Yushchenko with fellow opposition leader Oleksandr Moroz during the Orange Revolution, 2004

In 2002, Yushchenko became the leader of the Our Ukraine (Nasha Ukrayina) political coalition, which received a plurality of seats in the year's parliamentary election. However, the number of seats won was not a majority, and efforts to form a majority coalition with other opposition parties failed. Since then, Yushchenko has remained the leader and public face of the Our Ukraine parliamentary faction.

In 2001, both Yushchenko and Tymoshenko broached at creating a broad opposition bloc against the incumbent President Kuchma in order to win the Ukrainian presidential election 2004.

In late 2002 Yushchenko, Oleksandr Moroz (Socialist Party of Ukraine), Petro Symonenko (Communist Party of Ukraine) and Tymoshenko (Yulia Tymoshenko Bloc) issued a joint statement concerning "the beginning of a state revolution in Ukraine". Though the communists stepped out of the alliance and though Symonenko opposed having one single candidate from the alliance in the 2004 presidential election, the other three parties remained allies until July 2006.

On 2 July 2004, Our Ukraine and the Yulia Tymoshenko Bloc established the Force of the people, a coalition which aimed to stop "the destructive process that has, as a result of the incumbent authorities, become a characteristic for Ukraine", at the time Kuchma and Yanukovych were the incumbent authorities in Ukraine. The pact included a promise by Yushchenko to nominate Tymoshenko as prime minister if he won the October 2004 presidential election.

Yushchenko was widely regarded as the moderate political leader of the anti-Kuchma opposition, since other opposition parties were less influential and had fewer seats in parliament. Since becoming President of Ukraine in 2005, he has been an honorary leader of the Our Ukraine party.

From 2001 to 2004, his rankings in popularity polls were higher than those of Kuchma. In later public opinion polls, though, his support plummeted from a high of 52% following his election in 2004 to below 4%.

However, in the parliamentary elections of March 2006, the Our Ukraine party, led by Prime Minister Yuriy Yekhanurov, received less than 14% of the national vote, taking third place behind the Party of Regions and the Yulia Tymoshenko Bloc. In a poll by the Sofia Social Research Centre between 27 July and 7 August 2007 more than 52% of those polled said they distrusted Yushchenko while 48% said they trusted him.

== Presidential election of 2004 ==
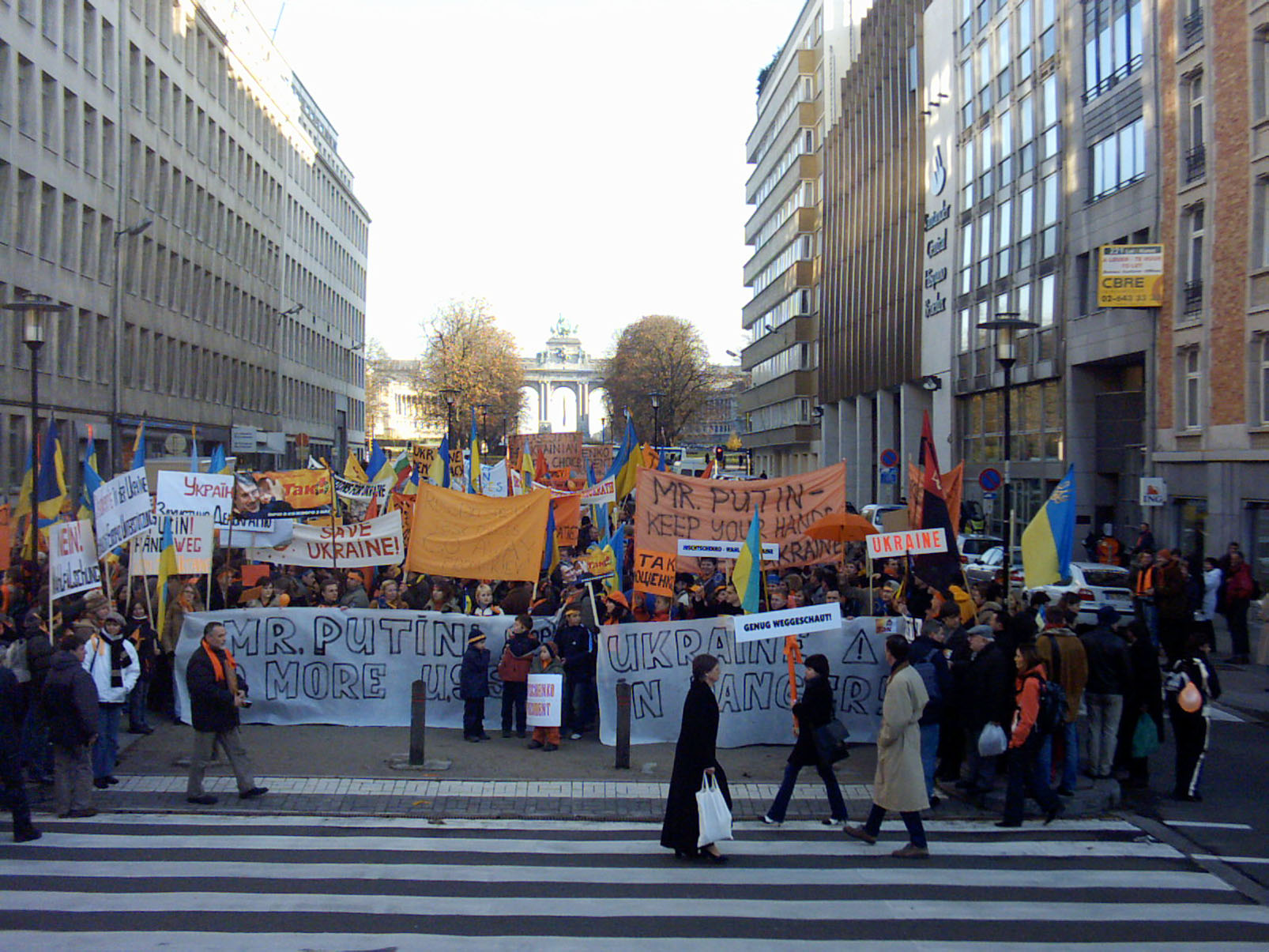
Pro-Orange Revolution demonstration in Brussels, Belgium

In 2004, as Kuchma's term came to an end, Yushchenko announced his candidacy for president as an independent. His major rival was Prime Minister Viktor Yanukovych. Since his term as prime minister, Yushchenko had slightly modernized his political platform, adding social partnership and other liberal slogans to older ideas of European integration, including Ukraine's joining NATO and fighting corruption. Supporters of Yushchenko were organized in the "Syla Narodu" ("Power to the People") electoral coalition, which he and his political allies led, with the Our Ukraine coalition as the main constituent force.

Yushchenko built his campaign on face-to-face communication with voters, since the government prevented most major TV channels from providing equal coverage to candidates. Meanwhile, his rival, Yanukovych, frequently appeared in the news and even accused Yushchenko, whose father was a Red Army soldier imprisoned at Auschwitz, of being "a Nazi," even though Yushchenko actively reached out to the Jewish community in Ukraine and his mother is said to have risked her life by hiding three Jewish girls for one and a half years during the Second World War.

== TCDD poisoning ==
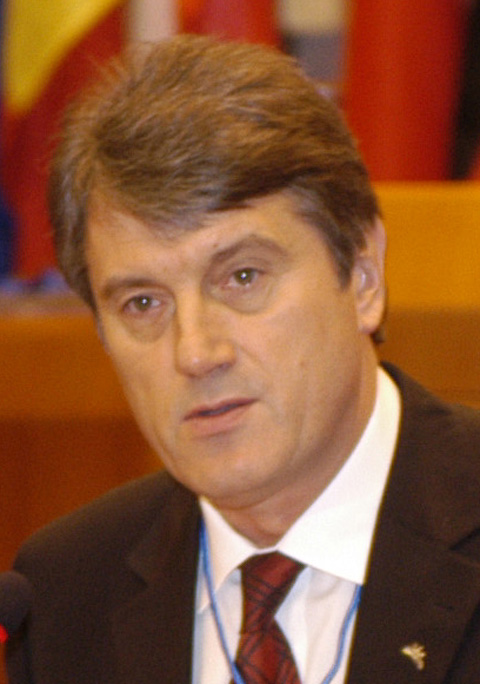
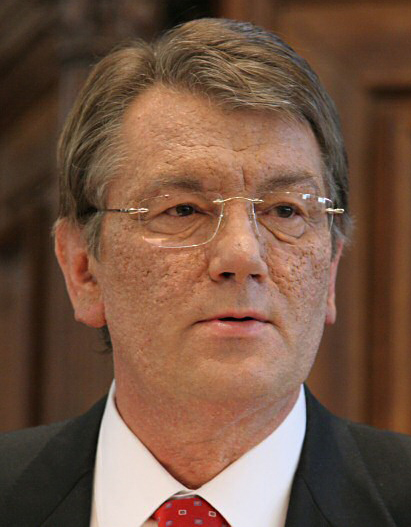
Left to right: Viktor Yushchenko before the poisoning (2004), and after (2006), with chloracne from his TCDD poisoning.

Yushchenko became seriously ill in early September 2004. He was flown to Vienna's Rudolfinerhaus Clinic for treatment and diagnosed with acute pancreatitis caused either by a serious viral infection or ingestion of chemical substances that are not normally found in food products. Yushchenko claimed that he had been poisoned by government agents.

After Yushchenko's illness, his face showed signs consistent with a diagnosis of chloracne. British toxicologist John Henry declared the lesions on Yushchenko's face were due to chloracne, which may have been caused by dioxin poisoning. Dutch toxicologist Bram Brouwer also stated that Yushchenko‘s facial lesions were characteristic of chloracne, and that he had found dioxin levels in Yushchenko's blood 6,000 times above normal.

On 11 December, Michael Zimpfer of the Rudolfinerhaus Clinic declared that Yushchenko had ingested TCDD dioxin and had 1,000 times the usual concentration in his body. However, Dr Lothar Wicke of the same institute, who was directly involved in Yushchenko's treatment, initially refused to "speculate" on whether Yushchenko was poisoned. On 11 December 2004, however, Michael Zimpfer stated that testing of Yushchenko's blood had confirmed that he had been poisoned with dioxin.

Many have linked Yushchenko's poisoning to a dinner with a group of senior Ukrainian officials (including Volodymyr Satsyuk) that took place on 5 September.

Since 2005, Yushchenko has been treated by a team of doctors led by Professor Jean Saurat at the University of Geneva Hospital. Analysis of Yushchenko's body fluids and tissues provided useful information on the human toxicokinetics of TCDD and its metabolites.

Yushchenko himself implicated Davyd Zhvania, the godfather of one of his children, of involvement in his dioxin poisoning.

In August 2009, The Lancet published a scientific paper by Swiss and Ukrainian researchers on the monitoring, form, distribution, and elimination of 2,3,7,8-tetrachlorodibenzodioxin (TCDD) in Yushchenko in relation to his severe poisoning. The 2004 TCDD levels in Yushchenko's blood serum were 50,000 times greater than those in the general population. This new study also concluded that the dioxin "was so pure that it was definitely made in a laboratory".

On 27 September 2009, Yushchenko said in an interview aired on Channel 1+1 that the testimony of three men who were at a dinner in 2004 at which he believes he was poisoned is crucial to finishing the investigation, and he claimed these men were in Russia. Ukrainian prosecutors said Russia has refused to extradite one of the men, the former deputy chief of Ukraine's security service, Volodymyr Satsyuk, because he holds both Russian and Ukrainian citizenship. Satsyuk returned to Ukraine in 2012 and tried to relaunch his political career, but did not succeed.

== Presidency ==
=== Inauguration ===
At 12 pm (Kyiv time) on 23 January 2005 the inauguration of Yushchenko as the President of Ukraine took place. The event was attended by numerous foreign dignitaries.

=== Presidency ===
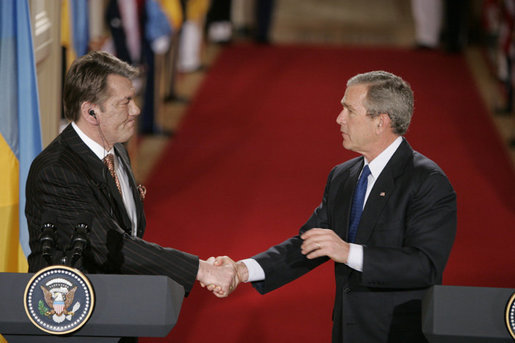
Yushchenko meeting U.S. President George W. Bush at an April 2005 press conference

The first hundred days of Yushchenko's term, 23 January 2005 through 1 May 2005, were marked by numerous dismissals and appointments at all levels of the executive branch. He appointed Tymoshenko as prime minister and the appointment was ratified by parliament. Oleksandr Zinchenko was appointed the head of the presidential secretariat with a nominal title of Secretary of State. Petro Poroshenko, a fierce competitor of Tymoshenko for the post of prime minister, was appointed Secretary of the Security and Defense Council.

In May 2005, Ukraine hosted the Eurovision Song Contest in the capital of Kyiv. Some accused Yushchenko of attempting to gain political capital from the event, with his appearance on stage at the end criticised as 'undignified' by certain commentators. During 2005, Yushchenko was in confident mood, making such pledges as solving the Gongadze case to the removal of Russia's Black Sea Fleet.

In August 2005, Yushchenko joined with Georgian President Mikheil Saakashvili in signing the Borjomi Declaration, which called for the creation of an institution of international cooperation, the Community of Democratic Choice, to bring together the democracies and incipient democracies in the region around the Baltic, Black, and Caspian Seas. The first meeting of presidents and leaders to discuss the CDC took place on 1–2 December 2005 in Kyiv.

According to former Security Service of Ukraine Chairman Oleksandr Turchynov, in the summer of 2005 Yushchenko prevented an investigation into allegedly fraudulent practices in the transport of Turkmen natural gas to Ukraine and the arrest of Yuri Boyko for abuse of office while heading Naftogaz.

=== Dismissal of other Orange Revolution members ===
On 8 September 2005, Yushchenko fired his government, led by Tymoshenko, after resignations and claims of corruption. On 9 September, acting Prime Minister Yekhanurov tried to form a new government. His first attempt, on 20 September, fell short by 3 votes of the necessary 226, but on 22 September the parliament ratified his government with 289 votes.

Also in September 2005, former president Leonid Kravchuk accused exiled Russian tycoon Boris Berezovsky of financing Yushchenko's presidential election campaign, and provided copies of documents showing money transfers from companies he said were controlled by Berezovsky to companies controlled by Yushchenko's official backers. Berezovsky confirmed that he met Yushchenko's representatives in London before the election, and that the money was transferred from his companies, but he refused to confirm or deny that the money was used in Yushchenko's campaign. Financing of election campaigns by foreign citizens is illegal in Ukraine.

In August 2006, Yushchenko appointed his onetime opponent in the presidential race, Yanukovych, to be the new prime minister. This was generally regarded as indicating a rapprochement with Russia.

=== First dissolution of Parliament ===
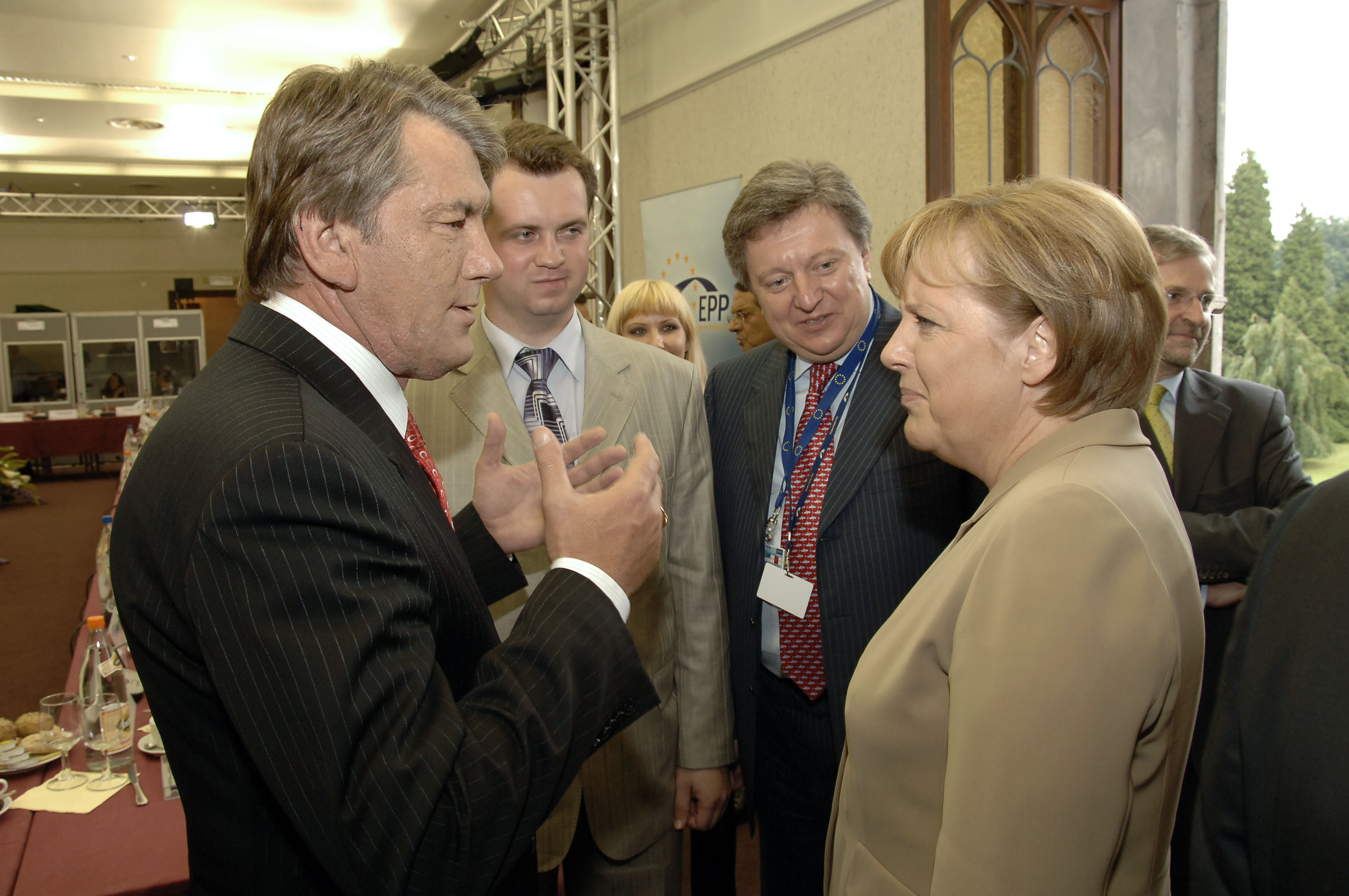
Yushchenko meeting German Chancellor Angela Merkel in EPP Summit in Meise, 21 June 2007

On 2 April 2007, Yushchenko signed an order to dissolve the parliament and call early elections. Some consider the dissolution order illegal because none of the conditions spelled out under Article 90 of the Constitution of Ukraine for the president to dissolve the legislature had been met. Yushchenko's detractors argued that he was attempting to usurp the functions of the Constitutional Court by claiming constitutional violations by the parliament as a pretext for his action. The parliament appealed the Constitutional Court itself and promised to abide by its ruling.

In the meantime, the parliament continued to meet and banned the financing of any new election pending the Constitutional Court's decision. Competing protests took place and the crisis escalated. In May 2007, Yushchenko illegally dismissed three members of Ukraine's Constitutional Court, thus preventing the court from ruling on the constitutionality of his decree dismissing Ukraine's parliament.

=== Second dissolution of Parliament and conflict with Tymoshenko (2008–2009) ===
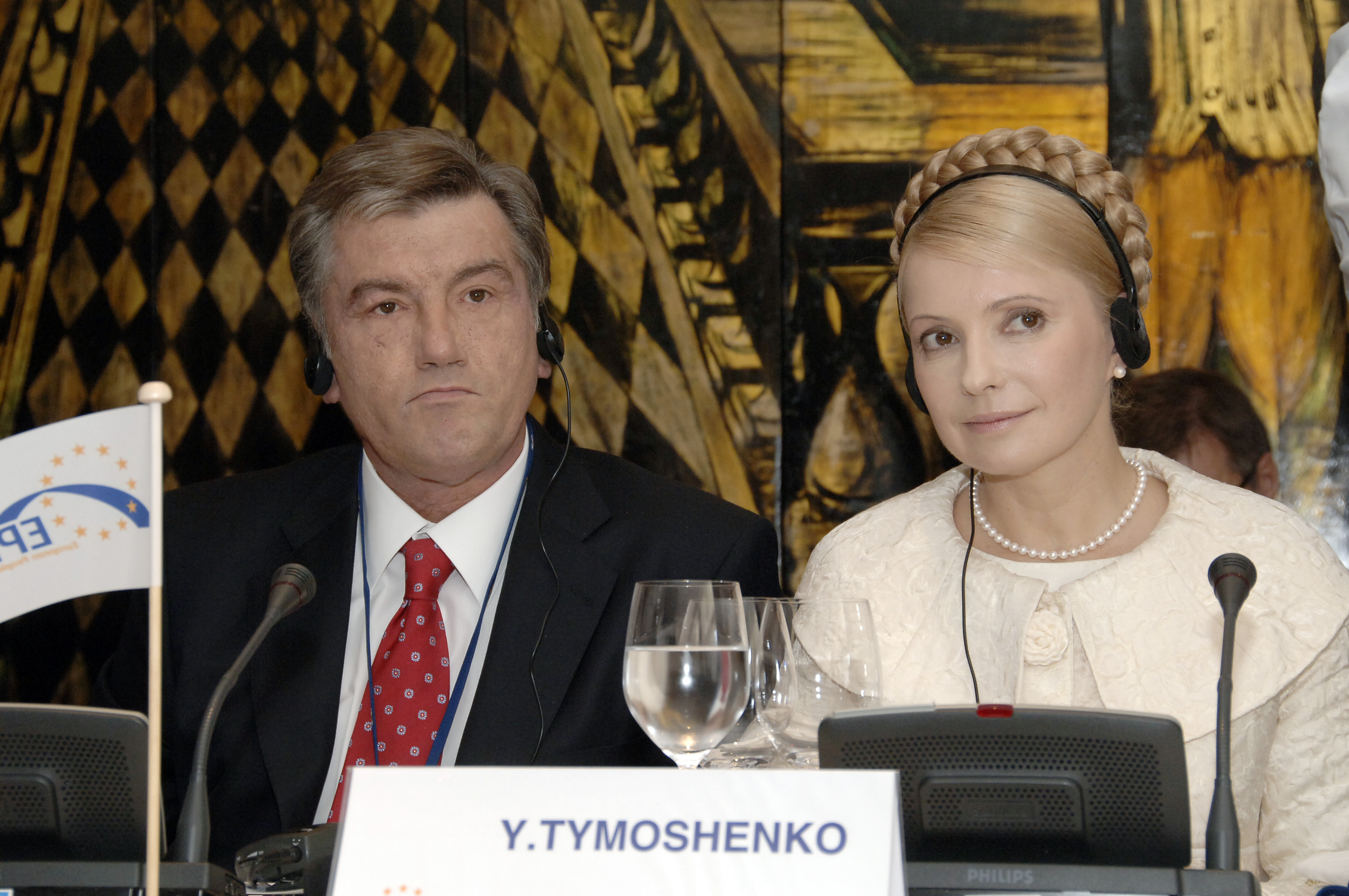
Yushchenko and Yulia Tymoshenko representing their parties ("Our Ukraine" and "Fatherland") at the Summit of European People's Party, Lisbon, Portugal, 18 October 2007

Yushchenko again tried to dissolve the parliament on 9 October 2008 by announcing parliamentary elections to be held on 7 December. Yushchenko's decree was suspended and subsequently lapsed. Yushchenko in defense of his actions said, "I am deeply convinced that the democratic coalition was ruined by one thing alone—human ambition. The ambition of one person." Political groups including members of his own Our Ukraine party contested the election decree and politicians vowed to challenge it in the courts.

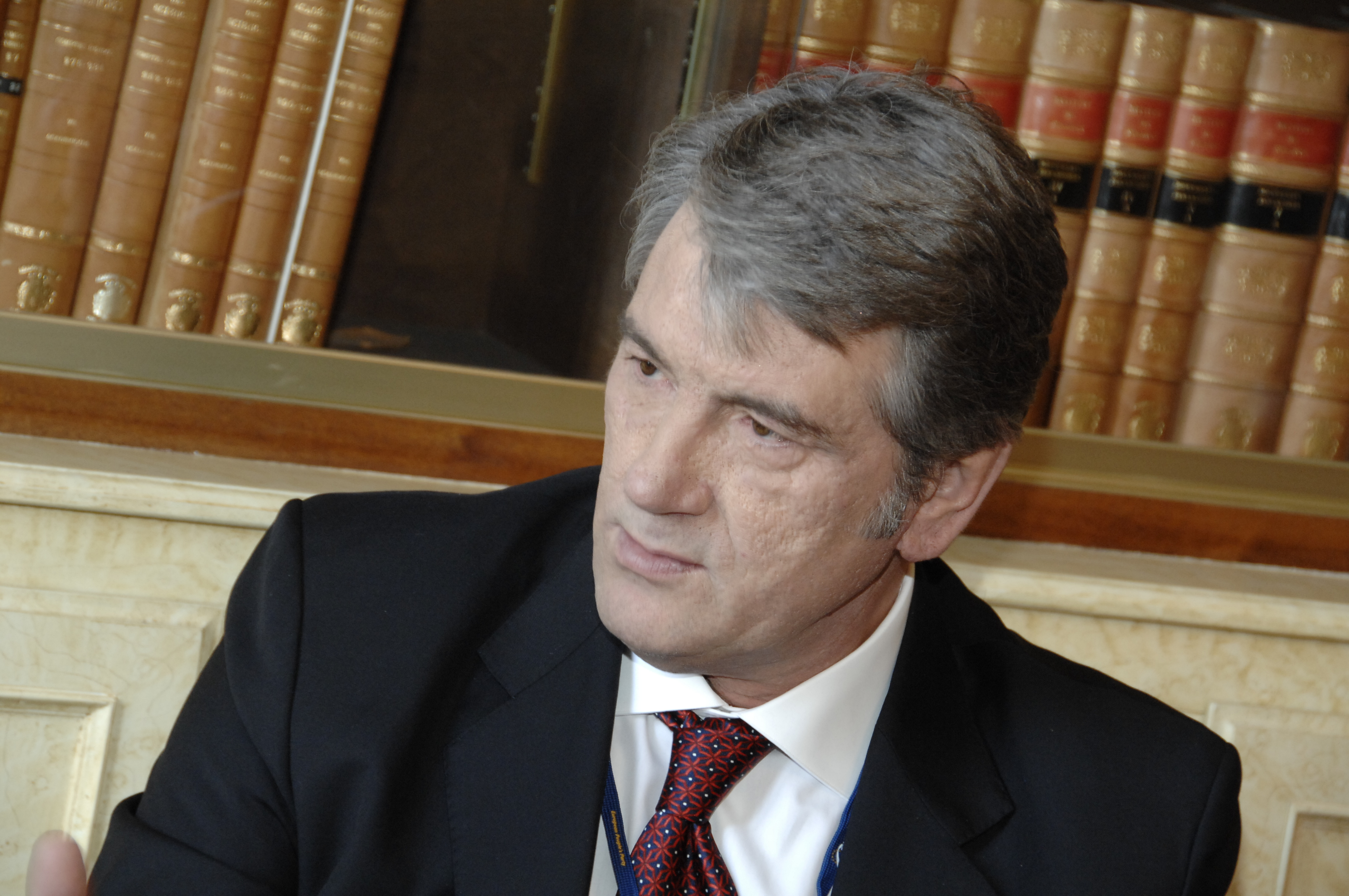
Yushchenko in March 2009

In December 2008, following a back room revolt from members of Our Ukraine-Peoples' Self Defense Party a revised coalition was formed between members of Our Ukraine (OU-PSD), the Bloc of Yulia Tymoshenko (BYuT), and the Lytvyn Bloc (LB), increasing the size of the governing coalition by an additional 20 members. Yushchenko in responding to journalists questions claimed "The fact is that the so-called coalition was formed on basis of political corruption, this coalition will be able to work only if the Communist Party will join it. Speaking about such a type of coalition, it is even more shameful." Yushchenko also stated that Tymoshenko's desire to keep her job as Prime Minister was the main motive for creating the coalition and that he wanted to expel the OU-PSD lawmakers who supported the creation of the coalition from the list of members of parliament.

Yushchenko claimed (19 March 2009) that his conflicts with Tymoshenko are not due to personal differences, but to the incompleteness of the constitutional reforms of 2004.

On 23 July 2009, under the terms of Ukraine's Constitution the president cannot dismiss the parliament within six months from the expiration of his five-year term of authority, which ended on 23 January 2010.

== 2010 presidential election and later career ==
=== 2010 presidential election ===
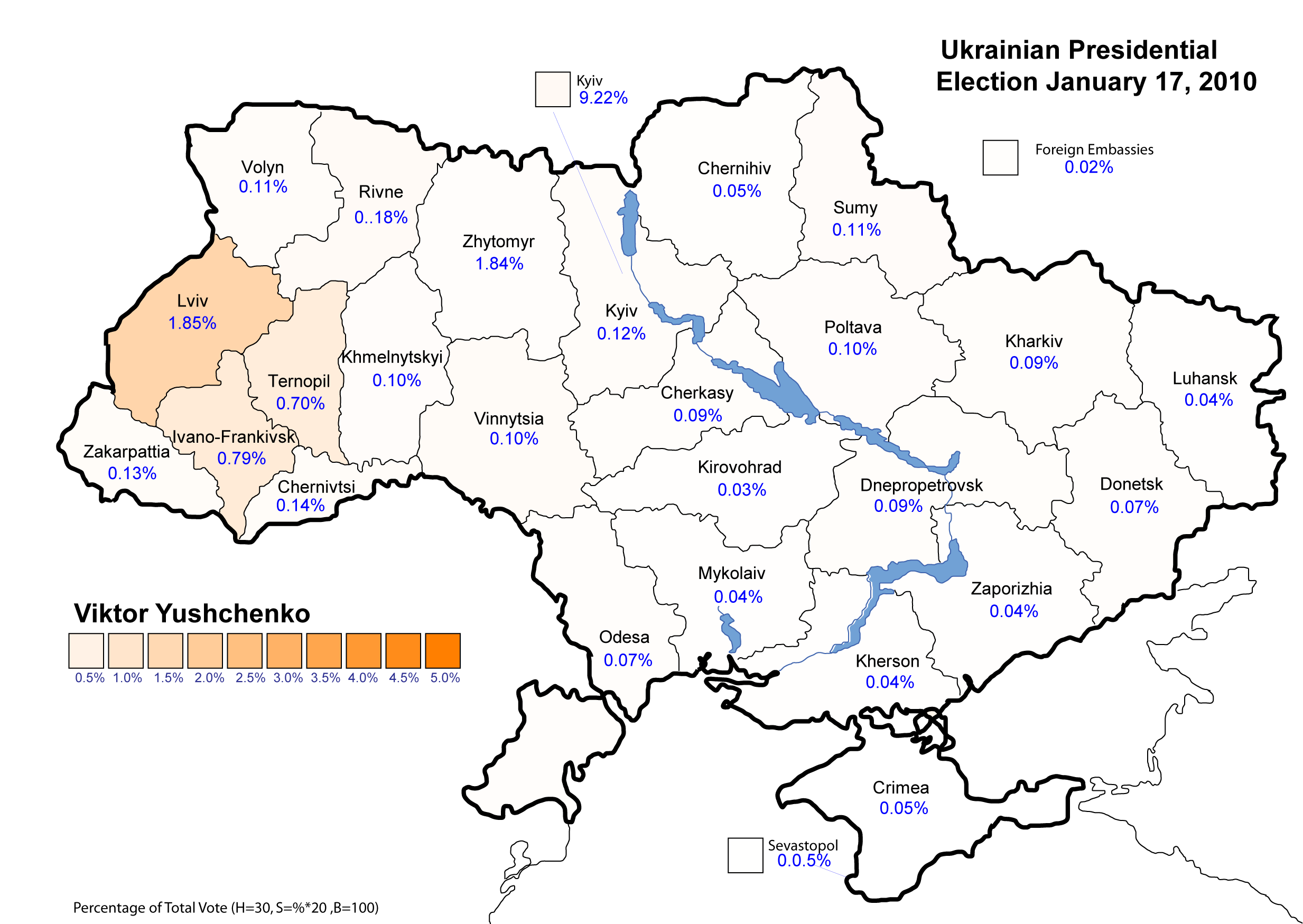
Viktor Yushchenko (first round) – percentage of total national vote (5.5%)

On 10 November 2009, Yushchenko was nominated for a second term as president, with the election to be held on 17 January 2010. In late November 2009, he stated he was going to leave politics after his possible second term. During the campaign, Yushchenko claimed that his fellow candidates "Tymoshenko and Yanukovych are not ideologists who care about the fate of Ukraine and its interests. They are two political adventurers" and that Ukraine's independence and sovereignty were at the time more jeopardized than five to ten years earlier.

The first round of the elections took place on 17 January 2010, and Yushchenko dropped to a distant fifth place with only 5.45% of the vote. His result became the worst result for any sitting president.

Yushchenko stated that he wanted to continue to defend democracy in Ukraine and that he wanted to return to the presidency.

On 22 January 2010, as outgoing President, Yushchenko officially rehabilitated one of Ukraine's most controversial figures from the era of World War II, the ultranationalist leader Stepan Bandera, awarding him the title of Hero of Ukraine. Yushchenko's decision immediately caused an uproar and was condemned by the European Parliament and Russian, Polish, and Jewish organizations and was declared illegal by the following Ukrainian government and a court decision in April 2010. In January 2011, the award was officially annulled.

In the second round of Ukraine's presidential election, Yushchenko did not support either of the candidates, Yanukovych or Tymoshenko.

Yushchenko attributed his low popularity ratings to his adherence to his principles. "Ukraine is a European democratic country", Yushchenko said at the polling station. "It is a free nation and free people." In the following days, he said that "Ukraine doesn't have a decent choice" for his replacement. "Both candidates are alienated from national, European, and democratic values. I don't see a principal difference between them." However, his low approval ratings may also be attributable to his tacit support for his former adversary Yanukovych between rounds one and two. Yushchenko removed the Kharkiv and Dniproptrovsk governors, who had expressed support for Tymoshenko and had refused to provide administrative resources for Yanukovych's campaign.

Yushchenko did not attend the inauguration ceremony of Yanukovych.

On 10 March 2010, Yushchenko indicated his future plans would largely depend on Yanukovych's performance. A day earlier, Yushchenko's former ally turned rival, Tymoshenko, took up the mantle as leader of the democratic opposition. But Yushchenko warned that her leadership would end in disaster, noting, "[e]very political force that united with Tymoshenko ended badly." On 31 May 2010 Yushchenko stated that Tymoshenko was his "worst mistake": "The most serious mistake was to give power to her twice".

=== Later career including 2012 parliamentary elections ===
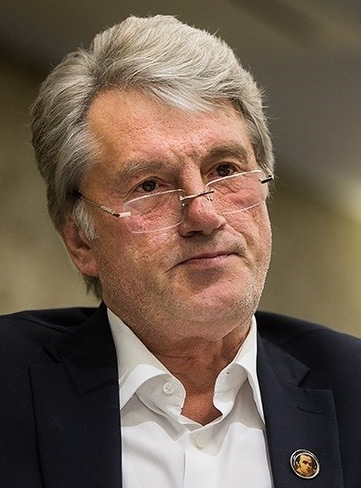
Yushchenko in August 2016

Yushchenko testified against his former ally Tymoshenko during her trial over a 2009 natural gas treaty she brokered with Russia; a trial he called "a normal judicial process". Yushchenko's view differed from that of the European Union's (EU) foreign policy chief Catherine Ashton, who said in a statement the Tymoshenko verdict showed justice was being applied "selectively in politically motivated prosecutions".

Late September 2011 Yushchenko stated he intended to run for parliament on an Our Ukraine party ticket at the 2012 Ukrainian parliamentary elections. Mid-February 2012 Yushchenko stated he was ready to take part in this election on a list of the united opposition, but not in a majority constituency. In these election Yushchenko headed the election list of Our Ukraine; the party won 1.11% of the national votes and no constituencies and thus failed to win parliamentary representation.

In February 2013 Yushchenko intended to be a candidate during the next presidential election (at the time scheduled to be in 2015).

==== Euromaidan and 2014 election ====
In an interview with the French radio station Europe 1 in March 2014, Yushchenko stated that he supported the Euromaidan protests and opposed the Russian invasion in Crimea, noting that in his view "Putin dreams of reconstructing the Soviet empire under the name of Russia. He is so obsessed with this that he hasn't understood power balance." He further stated that "Crimea isn't Russian; rather it is Ukrainian".

With regard to the 2014 presidential election, Yushchenko indicated his support for Vitali Klitschko, and described Tymoshenko as "the candidate of Moscow". Yushchenko himself did not stand as a candidate in these elections.

=== Russian invasion of Ukraine ===
In a 2024 interview, Yushchenko criticized the US Congress's delay in approving military aid to Ukraine, describing it as “a colossal waste of time” that allowed Russia to “attack, ruin infrastructure, rampage all over Ukraine”. He also supported President Volodymyr Zelenskyy's handling of the situation and opposed giving up territory to end the war, saying that it would give Vladimir Putin "five or seven years to get stronger and then start this misery again". In 2025, Yushchenko stated that even the liberation of Ukrainian territory in its internationally recognized borders would not guarantee Ukrainian security, which can only be achieved with the liquidation of Putin's regime in Moscow.

=== Other activities ===
On 4 August 2026 Yushchenko was elected head of the supervisory board of National Museum of the Holodomor-Genocide. Former Canadian ambassador to Ukraine Roman Waschuk became his deputy on that post.

== Political positions ==
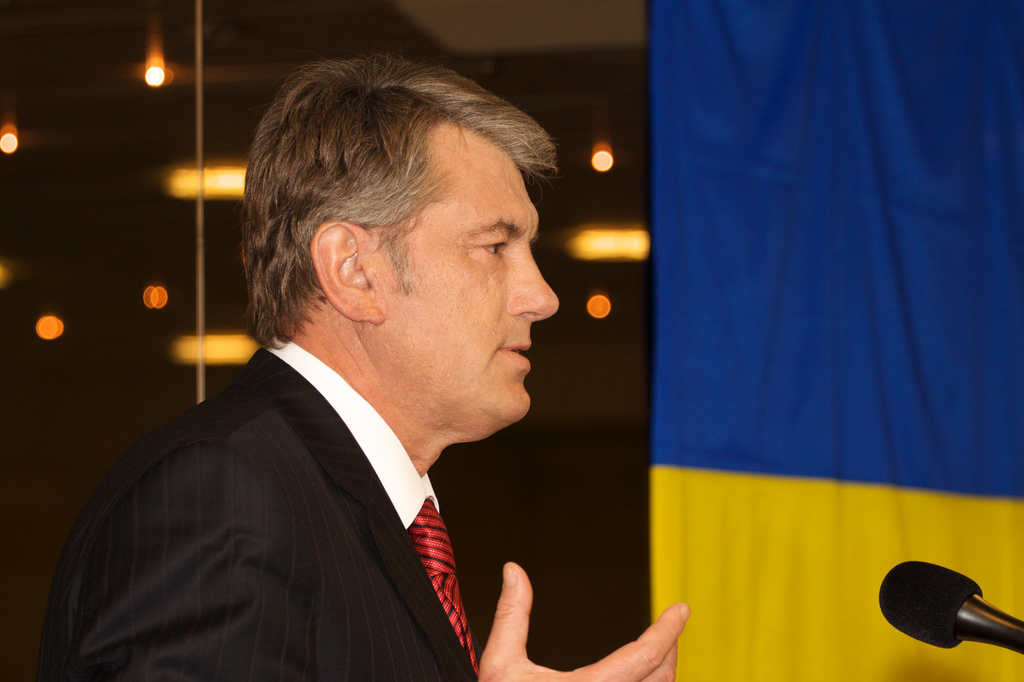
Yushchenko speaking at the University of Zurich in 2009

On 31 March 2009, in his address to the nation before Parliament, Yushchenko proposed sweeping government reform changes and an economic and social plan to ameliorate current economic conditions in Ukraine and apparently to respond to standing structural problems in Ukraine's political system.

The proposal, which Yushchenko called a 'next big step forward for fairness and prosperity in Ukraine' included the following proposals:

- Restore financial stability in the country by implementing the International Monetary Fund reforms and a balanced budget
- Abolish parliamentary immunity
- Fair pension system based on the number of years of work and salary received
- Pass a realistic state budget for 2009 that reduces inflation and stabilizes the hryvnia
- Have the state assume responsibility for struggling banks
- Rejuvenate rural areas by eliminating state interference in agriculture production
- Promote Ukrainian products abroad to increase sales for Ukraine's producers
- European Union membership and increased trade while simultaneously improving relations and trade with Russia
- Allow voters to elect members of parliament from the areas where they live
- Open up party lists for both parliamentary and local elections
- Create bicameral parliament to bring stability to the legislative branch
- Reduce the number of members of parliament

Yushchenko also advocates NATO membership for Ukraine and is against promoting Russian as the second state language in Ukraine.

According to Yushchenko, a good future for the country is impossible without national unity. Yushchenko also advocates the formation of a single Orthodox Church of Ukraine, thus unifying the current three branches of the Orthodox church in Ukraine (the Ukrainian Orthodox Church of Moscow Patriarchate, the Ukrainian Orthodox Church of Kyiv Patriarchate and the Ukrainian Autocephalous Orthodox Church).

Actions by the Ukrainian Insurgent Army have been praised by Yushchenko, and he has tried to give anti-Soviet partisans who fought in World War II the status of war veterans.

According to Yushchenko the difficulties of relations between Ukraine and Russia are because the countries follow different directions and have different system of values. Yushchenko thinks that "the Russia-Georgia war of August 2008 poses a threat that European leaders still haven't addressed". He has called for a demarcation of borders between Russia and Ukraine, which has been delayed by Russia since Ukraine won independence from the Soviet Union in 1991.

During the campaign for the Ukrainian presidential election, 2010 Yushchenko said Russia's influence was again a factor in the upcoming election and warned of "interference" from Moscow in the distribution of Russian passports to residents of Crimea. He stated (on 10 December 2009) "Russia is a friendly country and that it would be a great mistake for Ukraine to lose these relations or to slow down their development; I believe that there will appear politicians in Russia, who will respect the rights of all neighbors, including Ukraine".

Yushchenko's 2010 presidential election program promised visa-free travel with EU, the withdrawal of the Black Sea Fleet of the Russian Federation by 2017 and "an active dialogue with all of Ukraine's neighbours based on the principles of equal rights, good neighbourly relations and mutual trust", but did not mention NATO membership. Yushchenko also believed that the 2008–2009 Ukrainian financial crisis could be tackled with the help of reconstruction, including road reconstruction. The program banned tax collection in advance, would return non-reimbursed VAT, create equal tax rules for everybody and stop government interference in certain enterprises and whole sectors of the economy.

Yushchenko considers an open list of candidates for parliamentary elections as one of the conditions for eradicating corruption.

On 2 March 2022, Yushchenko described Russia after its invasion of Ukraine in February 2022 as "the Moscow junta and the Russian fascist regime".

== Family and personal life ==
In 1977, Yushchenko married Svitlana Ivanivna Kolesnyk, with whom he has two children and five grandchildren:

- Vitalina (b. 15 April 1980) currently married to Oleksiy Khakhlyov, director of a tar-paper factory in Slavuta, Khmelnytskyi Oblast. The couple has two children: Viktor (born 2005) and Andriana (born 2009). In addition, Vitalina has a daughter called Domenika (born 2000) from her previous husband Mykhailo Honchar.
- Andriy (b. 1985) has two daughters: one born in 2010 from his first marriage with the sister of Ukrainian TV presenter Masha Efrosinina, and another one born in 2022 from his current wife Olena.

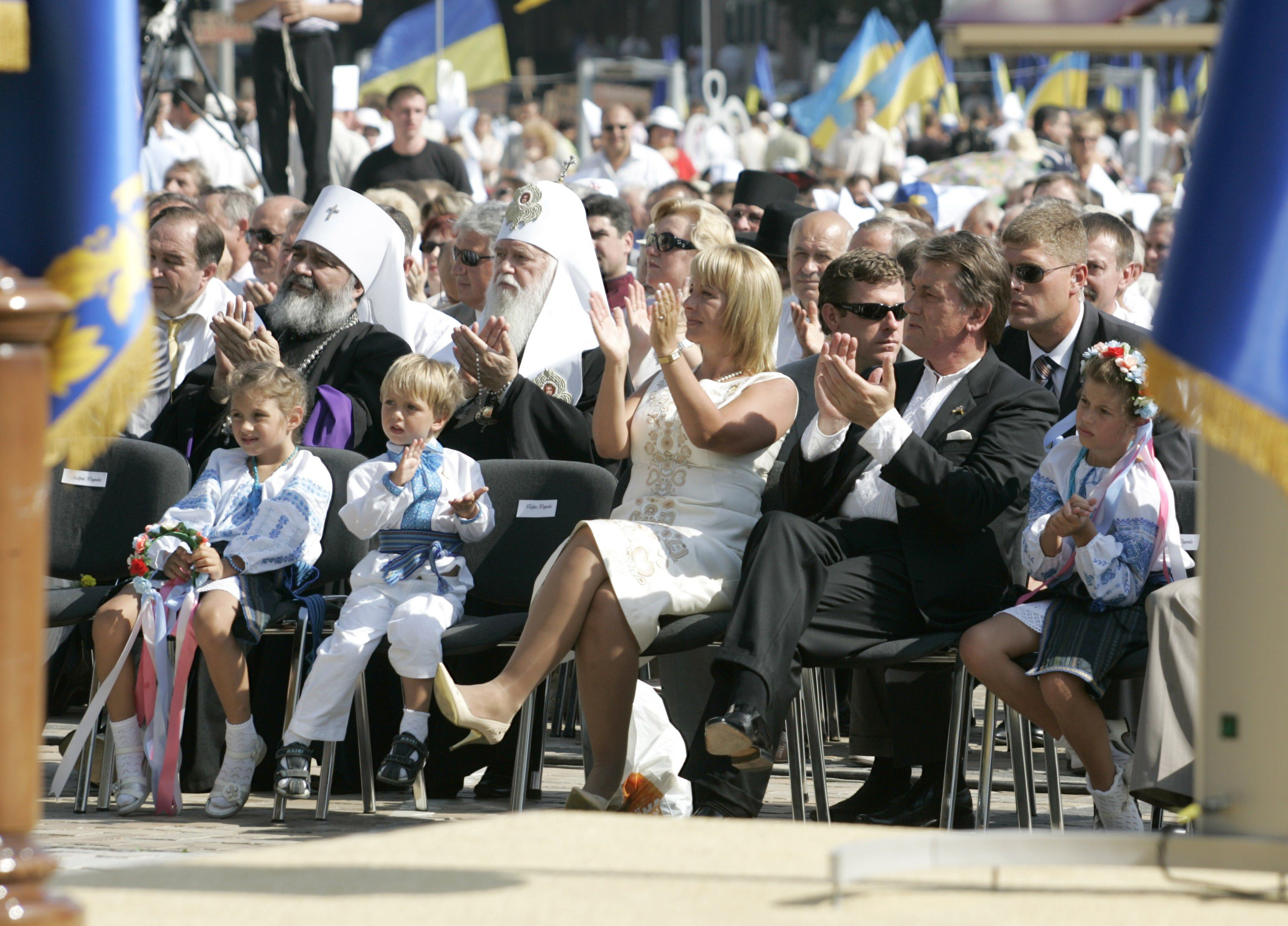
Viktor and Kateryna Yushchenko with their children, 2007

In 1998, he married Kateryna Chumachenko, with whom he has three children. She is a Ukrainian-American born in Chicago who received a degree in Economics from Georgetown University and an MBA from the University of Chicago. She also studied at the Harvard Ukrainian Research Institute.

A practicing member of the Ukrainian Orthodox Church, Yushchenko often emphasizes the important role of his religious convictions in his life and worldview.

Yushchenko has been criticized for using many words of Russian origin when speaking Ukrainian. His main hobbies are Ukrainian traditional culture (including art, ceramics, and archaeology), mountaineering, and beekeeping. He is keen on painting, collects antiques, folk artifacts, and Ukrainian national dress, and restores objects of Trypillya culture. Each year he climbs Hoverla, Ukraine's highest mountain. After receiving a checkup in which doctors determined he was healthy despite the previous year's dioxin poisoning, he successfully climbed the mountain again on 16 July 2005.

== Cultural and political image ==
As a politician, Yushchenko is widely perceived as a mixture of Western-oriented and Ukrainian nationalist. He advocates moving Ukraine in the direction of Europe and NATO, promoting free market reforms, preserving Ukraine's culture, rebuilding important historical monuments, and remembering Ukraine's history, including the famine of 1932–1933, commonly referred to as The Holodomor. His opponents (and allies) sometimes criticize him for indecision and secrecy, while his advocates argue that the same attributes indicate Yushchenko's commitment to teamwork, consensus, and negotiation. He is also often accused of being unable to form a unified team without infighting.

United States Ambassador to Ukraine John F. Tefft, described Yushchenko, in a document uncovered during the United States diplomatic cables leak, as discredited among the population because of his weakness of leadership, continuous conflicts with Tymoshenko, needless hostility towards Russia and his NATO ambitions.

Yushchenko's former Minister of Internal Affairs Yuriy Lutsenko, while awaiting trial on corruption charges for which he was subsequently convicted, accused Yushchenko of betraying the Orange Revolution by bringing Yanukovych to power.

In December 2011, Russian Prime Minister Putin claimed that the organizers of the 2011 Russian protests were former (Russian) advisors to Yushchenko during his presidency and were transferring the Orange Revolution to Russia.

=== Public opinion polls ===
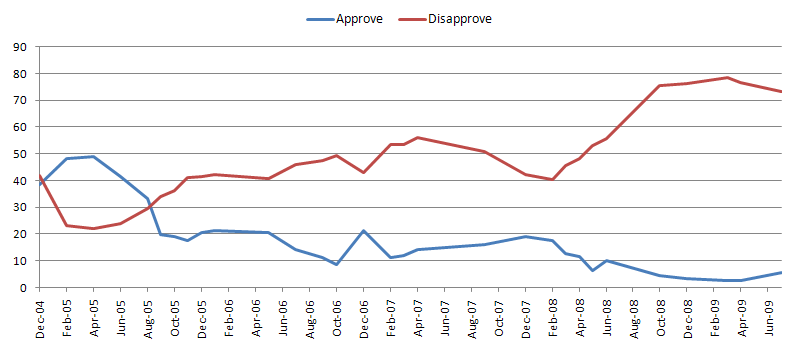
Yushchenko's approval rating stood at 7% as of October 2009 according to FOM-Ukraine polling results.

In March 2009, Yushchenko's popularity plunged to just 22%. According to a poll carried out by the Kyiv International Institute of Sociology between 29 January and 5 February 2009, nearly 70% of Ukrainian voters believed that Yushchenko should leave his post, whereas just over 30% believed he should stay. When asked if Yushchenko should be impeached, over 56% of those polled were in favor with 44% against.

According to a public opinion poll conducted by FOM-Ukraine in September/October 2009, 88.5% of those polled did not support the actions of Yushchenko as president, while 11.5% welcomed them. A Razumkov Center opinion poll conducted in October 2011 told that 80% of Ukrainians did not support his actions, while 20% of Ukrainians supported his actions; it was the highest negative rating of any Ukrainian politician.

== Honours and awards ==
- Latvia: Commander Grand Cross with Chain of the Order of Three Stars (2006)
- Lithuania: Grand Cross with Golden Chain of the Order of Vytautas the Great (2006)
- Croatia: Grand Cross of the Grand Order of King Tomislav (6 June 2007)
- Poland:
  - Order of the White Eagle (2005; renounced in 2026, see 2026 Poland–Ukraine diplomatic crisis)
  - Grand Cross of the Order of Polonia Restituta (2009)
- Ukraine: Order "For Merits" of Class III (1996)
- United States: The Liberty Medal (US Constitution Center, Philadelphia, PA) (2005)
- Azerbaijan: Order of Heydar Aliyev (2008)
- Finland: Order of the White Rose of Finland (2006)
- Georgia:
  - Order of the Golden Fleece (2009)
  - St. George's Order of Victory (2009)
  - Presidential Order of Excellence (2011)
- Sweden: Royal Order of the Seraphim (2008)
- Hungary: Order of Merit of the Republic of Hungary (2008)
- Germany: Quadriga (2006)

Yushchenko was named "Man of the Year 2004" by Wprost and included in the 2005 Time 100, an annual list of Time' 100 most influential people in the world.

Honorary doctorates from the National University of Kyiv-Mohyla Academy (1996), the University of Maria Curie-Sklodowska (2000) and the Catholic University of Lublin (2009), and honorary membership in the Academy of Sciences of Moldova.

On 21 June 2026, Viktor Yushchenko returned his Order of the White Eagle to Poland in protest against the decision of Polish President Karol Nawrocki to revoke this award from Volodymyr Zelenskyy.

== See also ==
- 2008 Ukrainian political crisis
- List of poisonings
- National Museum "Memorial to Holodomor victims"
- Politics of Ukraine
- Ukrainization
- Yushchenko Plan

== Notes ==
Government offices
Preceded by Vadym Hetman	Governor of the National Bank of Ukraine; 1993–1999	Succeeded by Volodymyr Stelmakh
Political offices
Preceded by Valeriy Pustovoitenko	Prime Minister of Ukraine; 1999–2001	Succeeded by Anatoliy Kinakh
Preceded by Leonid Kuchma	President of Ukraine; 2005–2010	Succeeded by Viktor Yanukovych
