= Yakiv Smolii =

Ukrainian economist and banker

- Яків Смолій
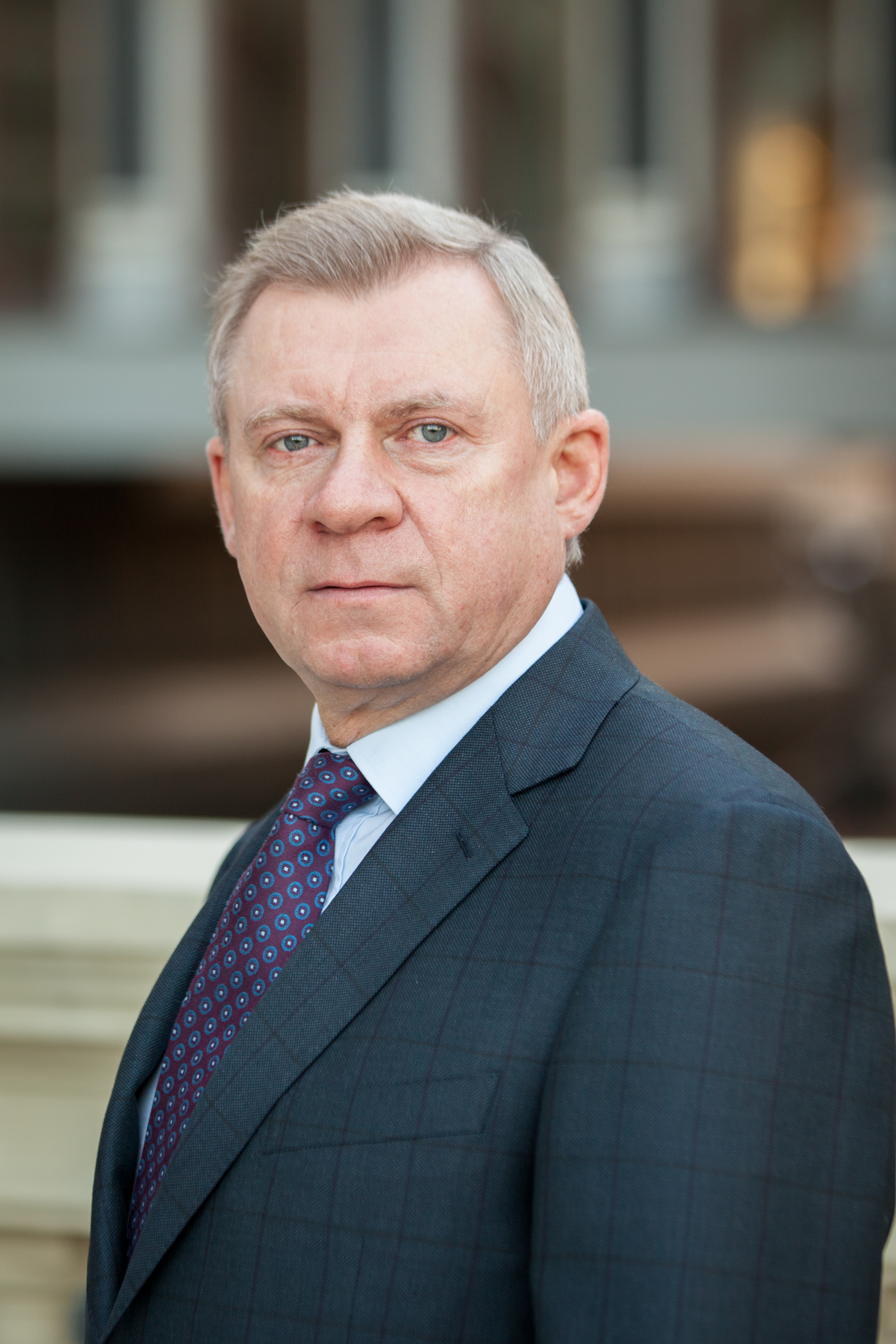

11th chairman of the National Bank of Ukraine
- In office 15 March 2018 – 3 July 2020
- Preceded by: Valeriia Hontareva
- Succeeded by: Kyrylo Shevchenko

Personal details
- Born: 1 February 1961 (age 65) Verbovets, Lanivtsi Raion, Ternopil Oblast, Ukrainian SSR
- Education: Lviv University
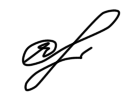
- Signature

Yakiv Vasyliovych Smolii (Ukrainian: Яків Васильович Смолій; born 1 February 1961) is a Ukrainian economist and banker and former chairman of the National Bank of Ukraine. He was acting governor of the National Bank from 11 May 2017 (when Valeriia Hontareva resigned) until the Ukrainian parliament elected him governor on 15 March 2018. Smolii was dismissed by the parliament on 3 July 2020 after he had tendered his resignation, he claimed he had done this as a result of long-standing political pressure.

== Early life and education ==
Smolii was born on February 1, 1961, in Verbovets, Lanivtsi Raion, Ternopil Oblast.

Smolii received his university education from Lviv University where he graduated with B.Sc. in mathematics in 1983. He majored in applied mathematics.

== Career ==
- Since 15 March 2018 — governor of the National Bank of Ukraine.
- Since 11 May 2017 — acting governor of the National Bank of Ukraine.
- Since 25 October 2016 — first deputy governor of the National Bank of Ukraine.
- Since 25 April 2014 — deputy governor of the National Bank of Ukraine.
- 2006 – 2014 — director on banking business, Prestige-Group.
- 2005 – 2006 — consultant at Office Stolychnyi CJSC and Prestige-Group.
- 1994 – 2005 — head of Automation Office, and later — deputy chairman of the board, Aval Joint Stock Post Pension Bank.
- Between 1987 and 1991 Smolii worked as software engineer in private firm Orion, from where he left to work as head if IT division of regional office of National Bank of Ukraine in Ternopil.

== National Bank of Ukraine ==
From March 15, 2018 he was appointed Chairman of the National Bank of Ukraine by the decision of the Verkhovna Rada of Ukraine. 247 deputies of the Verkhovna Rada of Ukraine voted for him, saying "The National Bank must continue to be independent of political spectrum. Political independence will allow the National Bank to fulfill its mandate effectively, to ensure price and financial stability."

Smolii promised to focus the regulator's attention on maintaining of price financial stability, promotion of economic growth, integration of the Ukrainian financial system into European, maintaining and deepening cooperation with international partners, continued growth of a modern, sustainable and transparent banking system that can effectively contribute to sustainable economic development, resume loan origination to the real economy as soon as possible, conduct a thorough monetary liberalization, work on ensuring a low and stable inflation rate within the period of 5 years in the range of 5 +/- 1%, integrate the Ukrainian financial system into all-European system in the medium run, implementing European directives and norms, in accordance with the EU-Ukraine Association Agreement, and financial inclusion, that is, the availability and security of banking services

On March 2, 2018, in the interview for Interfax portal Smolii noted that the NBU prepared a renewal of the development strategy of the financial sector of Ukraine (in particular, for the time period 2020–2025). In addition, for the first time, a strategy of the National Bank of Ukraine was developed. It sets goals for the regulator in the medium run. The NBU has set 7 target benchmarks: the NBU plans to focus on resuming loan origination and a smooth transition to free capital movement in addition to the mandate, determined by the law on the NBU, to support low and stable inflation and ensure the stability and efficiency of the banking system. New tasks were also defined: ensuring the effective regulation of the entire financial sector and the development of financial inclusion.

Smolii also noted that the NBU plans to join several modern trends of financial digitalization, among which were cashless economy — transfer of most payments to non-cash form, movement towards European standards, implementation of the Payment Services Directive 2 (PSD2): new forms of financial documents and transactions that can be realized in Ukrainian SEP3, introduction of Instant payments - fast transfers with a guarantee from the payer to the recipient 24/7/365, implementation of "electronic hryvnia" - cash in electronic form (equivalent of fiat currency, which will be exchanged at the rate of 1:1 for cash or cashless equivalent), instant transactions with mobile, reduction of resources for the production and maintenance of cash through transferring it to non-cash form, and transfer of cash for maintenance (storage) from the NBU to the commercial sector.

Smolii was dismissed by the Ukrainian parliament on 3 July 2020 after he had tendered his resignation two days earlier. He claimed he had tendered his resignation because of long-standing political pressure. Before the vote Smolii addressed parliament and stated that he had "made a difficult but necessary decision to resign" because according to him the National Bank had "been under systematic political pressure for a long time. Pressure to approve decisions that are not economically sound, that focus on short-term simple victories and can cost the Ukrainian economy and Ukraine in the longer term". Smolii claimed this pressure was "paid rallies, pressure through the courts, information attacks and unfounded political assessments." He didn't explicitly state pressure from individual politicians but claimed that "at all meetings where the president, people's deputies or the prime minister were present the National Bank was asked to flood the economy with money and to cancel sound principles of regulation."

Advisor to Ukrainian president Volodymyr Zelenskyy on Economics Oleh Ustenko denied that Smolii had been pressured but that the National Bank had an outdated communication policy "when it seems that you explain, but you explain only when you want to."

== National Security and Defense Council of Ukraine ==
On March 28, 2018, he was appointed a member of the National Security and Defense Council of Ukraine by a decree of the President of Ukraine.

Government offices
Preceded by Valeriia Hontareva	Governor of the National Bank of Ukraine; 2017–2020	Succeeded by Kateryna Rozhkova (acting)
