= National Bank of Ukraine =

Central bank of Ukraine

National Bank of Ukraine Національний банк України

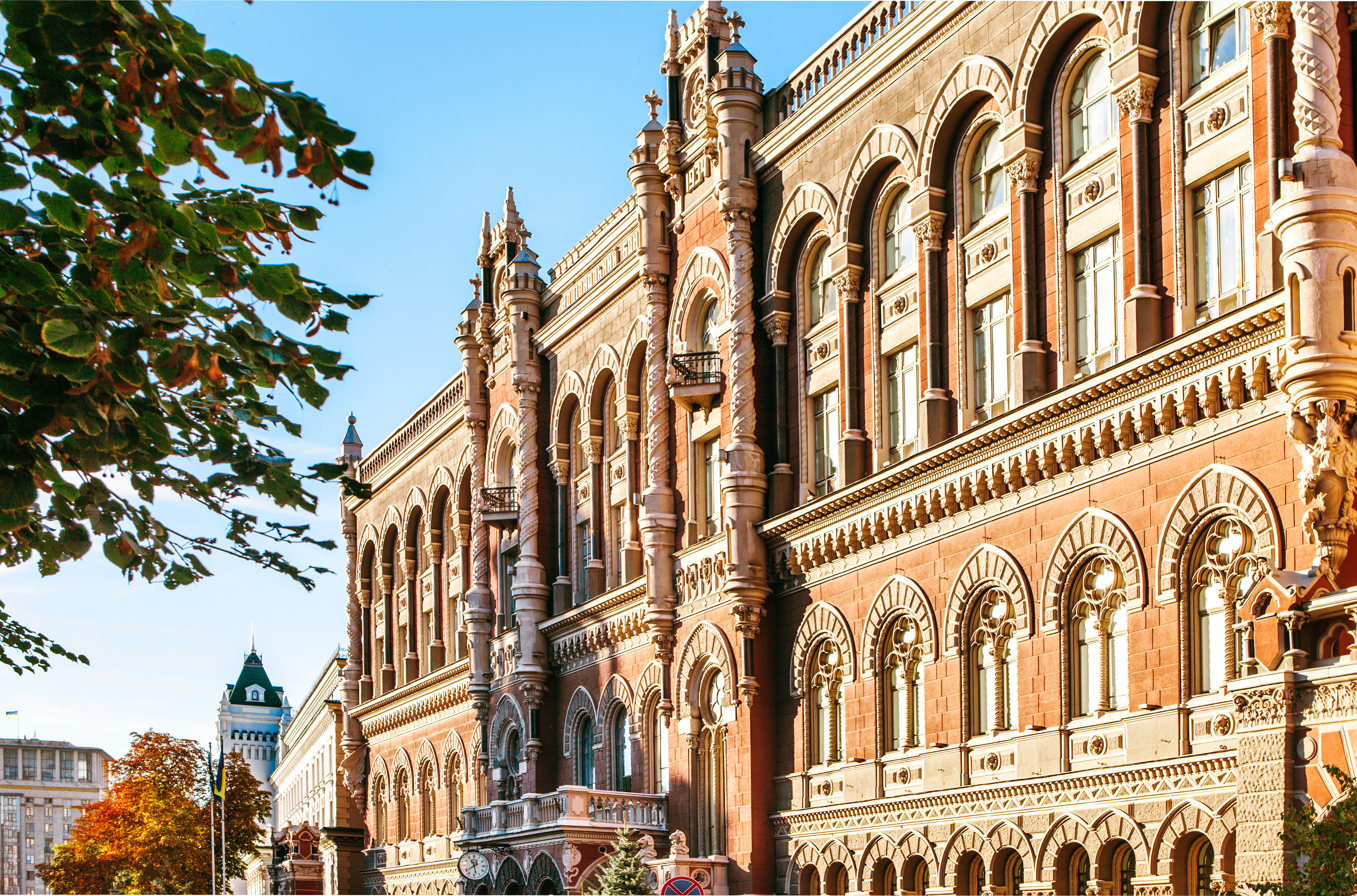
- National Bank of Ukraine Building in Kyiv
- Central bank of: Ukraine
- Headquarters: 9, Instytutska St., Kyiv, 01601
- Coordinates: 50°26′50″N 30°31′52″E
- Established: 1991
- Ownership: 100% state ownership
- Governor: Andriy Pyshnyi
- Currency: Ukrainian hryvnia UAH (ISO 4217)
- Reserves: $52.547 billion
- Bank rate: 25.0% (from June 03, 2022) UAH 20.20%, FE 4.80% (January 2019)
- Interest on reserves: UAH 13.0%, FE 2.60% (January 2019)
- Preceded by: Gosbank (in Ukrainian SSR territory)
- Website: bank.gov.ua/en/

The National Bank of Ukraine (Ukrainian: Національний банк України, romanized: Natsionalnyi bank Ukrainy [nɐts⁽ʲ⁾ioˈnɑlʲnɪj ˈbɑnk ʊkrɐˈjinɪ]; abbr. NBU [НБУ]) is the central bank of Ukraine. Created in 1991 from the Ukrainian operations of the Soviet Gosbank, the NBU employs over 12,000 people, making it one of the largest employers in the financial sector in Ukraine. It regulates and supervises activities, functions and the legal status of public and commercial banks based on the principles of the Constitution of Ukraine and the law of Ukraine.

== History ==
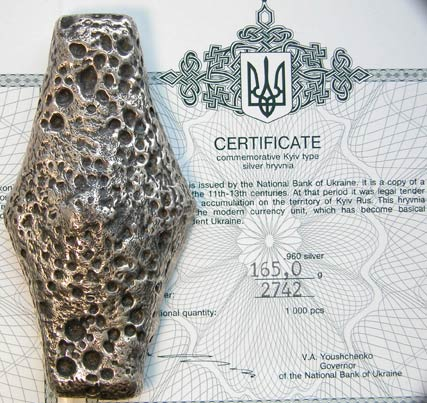
Silver hryvnia of the 11th-13th centuries

The State Bank of Ukraine (Український державний банк) was a predecessor of the NBU, founded on 22 December 1917 under a law passed by the Central Rada of the Ukrainian People's Republic on the basis of the Kyiv branch of the State Bank of the Russian Empire. It functioned under the UPR and Ukrainian State governments until it was liquidated by the Bolsheviks at the end of the Ukrainian War of Independence.

The Ukrainian branch of the Soviet Gosbank took on central banking functions in Ukraine in early 1991. Like institutions of many newly independent nations, it faced dire financial straits during the 1990s, leading to a prolonged period of hyperinflation. On 20 March 1991, the Verkhovna Rada (parliament) adopted the resolution "On Banks and Banking Activity", which became law on May 1. The resolution declared ownership by the Ukrainian SSR of the Ukrainian Republican branch of the Gosbank, which was subsequently renamed the National Bank. The same resolution simultaneously nationalized the Ukrainian Republic branch of the Soviet Promstroybank renamed Prominvestbank, the Ukrainian Republic branch of the Savings Bank of the USSR, and the Ukrainian Republic branch of the Foreign Trade Bank of the USSR as well as the Ukrainian Republic Department of cash settlement of the Soviet Gosbank.

Following the introduction of martial law on 24 February 2022, the National Bank of Ukraine took the extraordinary step of creating and promoting two separate accounts to receive donations (domestic and international) as a response to the Russian invasion of Ukraine: one account to support the Ukrainian military, and the other account to support the general populace with humanitarian assistance. On 5 March 2022, the NBU reported having raised "more than UAH 10 billion" (roughly US$350 million) for military and humanitarian aid.

== Legal status and structure ==
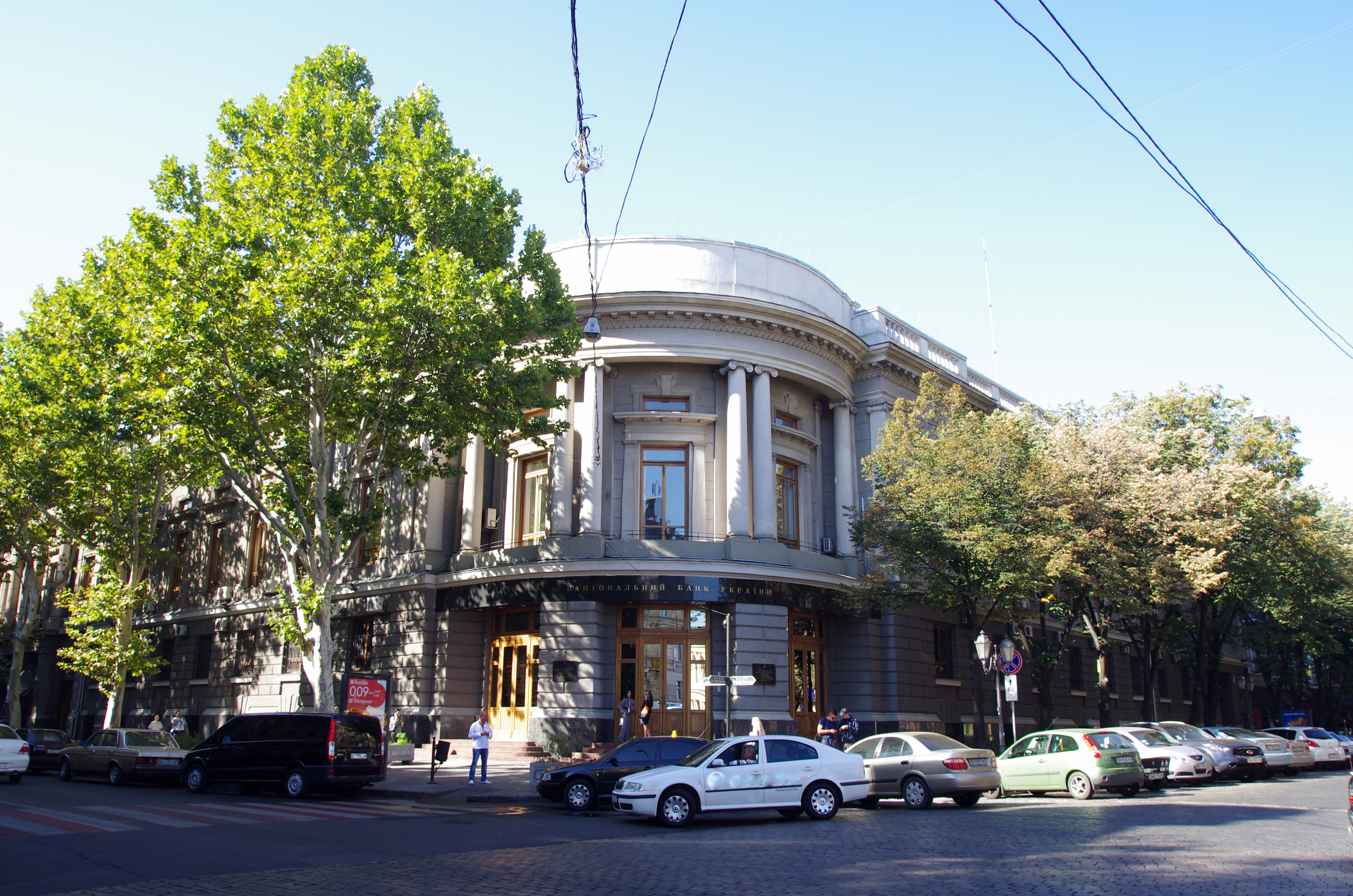
Regional branch in Odesa

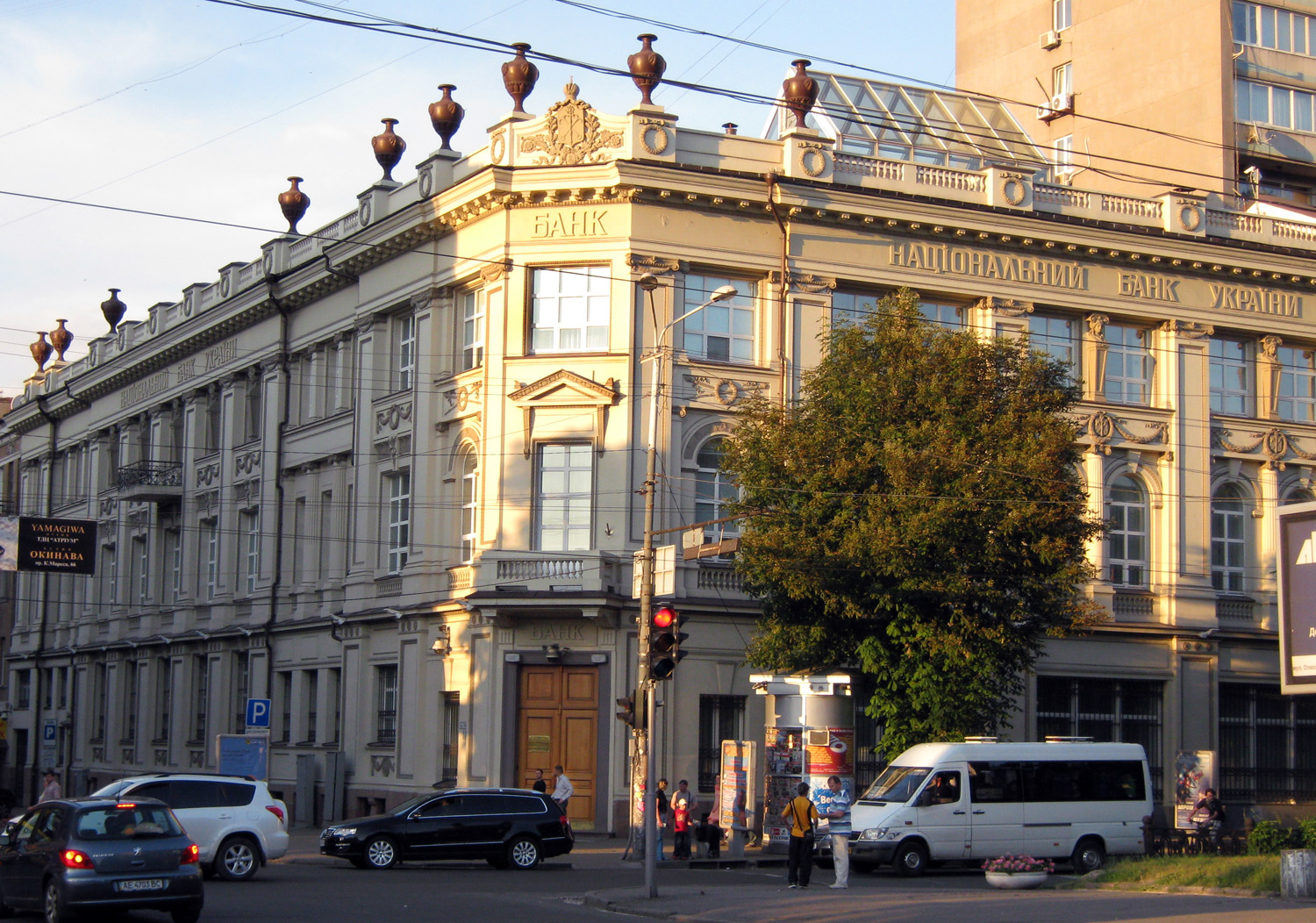
Regional branch in Dnipro

The legal status of the National Bank of Ukraine and the principles of its organization and activities are determined by the Constitution of Ukraine and the Law of Ukraine "On the National Bank of Ukraine".

The National Bank of Ukraine is a legal entity with separated property, which is the object of the state property. Its authorized capital amounts to UAH 100 million and is the state-owned property which is in the full economic competence of the National Bank.

According to Article 99 of the Constitution of Ukraine, adopted in 1996, the main function of the country's central bank is to ensure stability of monetary unit – the Hryvnia (Ukrainian's national currency). To carry out its main function, the National Bank shall foster the stability of the banking system and, within its competence, the price stability.

According to the Law of Ukraine "On the National Bank of Ukraine", the functions of the National Bank are:

- Ensuring the stability of Ukrainian currency;
- Development and implementation together with the government of an effective credit and monetary policy;
- Implementation of monetary emission and control over monetary circulation;
- Implementation of inter-bank settlements, including in international relations;
- Sale of credit resources to commercial banks and lending to the government;
- Regulation and control over the activities of commercial banks and other credit organizations;
- Implementation of currency regulation and ensuring the convertibility of the national currency;
- Storage and regulation of gold and currency reserves;
- State debt management;

The National Bank of Ukraine has the power to introduce legislation in the Verkhovna Rada. Resolutions of the NBU become enforceable when published on its website. Decisions of the NBU may be contested through the courts pursuant to Art.74 of the Law on the National Bank, however, courts may not suspend resolutions during the investigation of appeals.

The Governor of the National Bank of Ukraine is the chief executive, while its functions are coordinated by the Council of the National Bank of Ukraine. The council consists of 15 members including the Governor of the National Bank ex officio. Seven members are appointed by the President of Ukraine and the Verkhovna Rada. The quorum of the council is six members.

== Functions ==
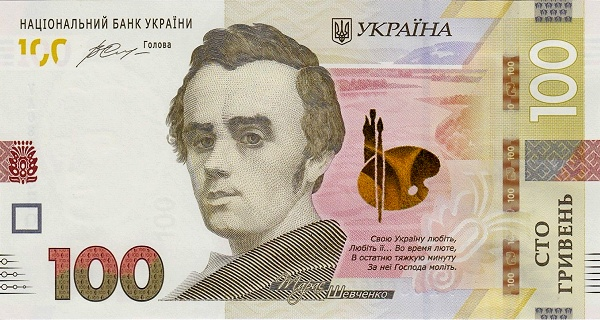
100 Ukrainian hryvnia bill

According to the Constitution of Ukraine, the main function of the National Bank of Ukraine (NBU) is to ensure the stability of Ukraine's monetary unit (the hryvnia). To carry this out, the National Bank fosters the stability of the banking system and, within its competence, price stability.

Due to Art.51 of the law on the National Bank of Ukraine, the NBU is accountable for its activities to the Verkhovna Rada (the parliament of Ukraine), the President of Ukraine and the Cabinet of Ministers of Ukraine.

=== Banking supervision ===
As part of its central banking functions, the National Bank bears responsibility for banking regulation and supervision in Ukraine.

All registered banks in Ukraine are member of the Deposit Guarantee Fund, which provides deposit insurance up to 200.000 UAH (approx. US$5000) per person and bank in case of insolvency. Until 2022, Oshadnybank was excluded from this fund because the Ukrainian state guaranteed its deposits directly. It joined the DGF in April 2022.

Banks are divided by the National Bank into four categories depending on their size (for intensity of banking supervision).

Since 2016, the Bank's Anti-Money Laundering and Tax-Evasion Policy has required the ownership structures of banks to published.

== Governors of the National Bank of Ukraine ==
The Governor of the National Bank of Ukraine is dismissed and appointed by the Verkhovna Rada (Ukraine's parliament). The President of Ukraine nominates a candidate before she/he can obtain a parliamentary approval. The President (also) submits to the Verkhovna Rada the draft resolution on the dismissal of the Governor.

The following people have served as the Governor of the National Bank since 1991:

No.	Portrait	Name	Took office	Left office
1		Volodymyr Matvienko	1991	1992
2		Vadym Hetman	1992	1992
3		Viktor Yushchenko	1993	2000
4		Volodymyr Stelmakh	2000	2002
5		Sergiy Tigipko	2002	2004
6		Volodymyr Stelmakh	2004	2010
7		Serhiy Arbuzov	2010	2012
8		Ihor Sorkin	2013	2014
9		Stepan Kubiv	2014	2014
10		Valeriya Hontareva	2014	2017 On 11 May 2017 the bank installed deputy governor Yakiv Smoliy as acting governor.
11		Yakiv Smoliy	2018	2020 On 3 July 2020 First Deputy Governor Kateryna Rozhkova temporarily assumed Smoliy's duties.
12		Kyrylo Shevchenko	2020	Asked for his resignation on 4 October 2022. Dismissed by parliament two days later.
13		Andriy Pyshnyi	2022	actual

== Commemorative coins ==
The national Bank of Ukraine offers a broad scale of commemorative and bullion coins and numismatic products, which are being sold primarily (2/3 of production) by the branches of NBU and 1/3 by state banks (Oschadbank and Ukrgasbank).

== See also ==
- National Bank of Ukraine building
- Ministry of Finance (Ukraine)
- Banking in Ukraine
- List of banks in Ukraine
- List of central banks
