= Jewish News One =

Jewish TV news channel

- JN1 Logo
- Broadcast area: North America, Eurasia
- Headquarters: Brussels, Belgium and Kyiv, Ukraine

Programming
- Languages: English, Russian

Ownership
- Owner: Igor Kolomoisky; Vadim Rabinovich; Alexander Zanzer

History
- Launched: 21 September 2011
- Closed: 22 April 2014

Links
- Website: JN1.TV

Jewish News One, or JN1, was an international news network covering world news with a focus on Judaism-related events. The channel was of Ukrainian - Belgian origin. Its primary mission was to report Jewish and Israeli current affairs without bias, and according to its co-founding producer, Alexander Zanzer, JN1 could accomplish this because it is an independent, non-profit organisation which does not depend on any nation, government, or political party. Their slogan was Informing Opinion, Expanding horizons. JN1 began broadcasting on 21 September 2011, and organisers called it the first global 24/7 Jewish news channel. JN1 was more commonly referred to as the "Jewish al Jazeera". It was closed in April 2014, being replaced by Ukraine News One. As of April 2015 JN1.tv has become part of JewishNews.com

== History ==
=== Background ===
JN1 was not affiliated with and receives no funding from the government of Israel. The network was owned by Ukrainian billionaires Igor Kolomoisky and Vadim Rabinovich, president and vice-president respectively of the European Jewish Union (EJU), a Brussels-based umbrella body of Jewish communities and organisations in Europe. They have reportedly invested $50 million USD in the channel. Both businessmen are prominent philanthropists in the international Jewish community, financing civil society events in Israel and Ukraine. They decided to launch a TV news network because, according to executive producer Alexander Zanzer, "they now want to do something that resonates on an international level."

=== Launch ===
Satellite broadcasting officially began in Europe on 21 September 2011. However, the network had been operating for some time before this date, with their first YouTube channel uploading video as early as 7 September 2011. Shortly after the 21st, satellite coverage was expanded to North America and Eurasia.

A channel presentation event, or launch party, was held in Brussels, Belgium on 21 September 2011. One of the owners, Vadim Rabinovitch, symbolically released dozens of balloons bearing the channel logo into the sky to mark what he called "an historic day".

=== Alleged deprivement of ownership ===
Co-owner Vadim Rabinovich wrote to the Prosecutor General's Office of Ukraine on 21 January 2012 ""A senior official from the current government visited Rabynovych on January 17 and, threatening harassment, including physical violence, demanded that the JN1 television channel be transferred to them within a week". Rabinovich did not believe that the visit by this official was authorized, and "believes that what is happening is the individual racketeering of a single representative of the system of government".

=== Closure and transformation into UN1, followed by becoming part of JewishNews.com ===
In April 2014, JN1 was shut down and replaced by a Ukrainian news network called Ukraine News One (styled UN^{1}) broadcasting on the channel previously used by JN1.

According to Variety, this new network was “a Ukrainian network with a propaganda slant”. UN^{1} closed in June 2014. Ten journalists of Jewish News 1 then moved over its successor, Ukraine Today. As of April 2015, the website JN1.tv has become part of JewishNews.com

== Objectives ==
Alexander Zanzer, the Brussels bureau chief, has said:

[JN1] will not necessarily be pro- or anti-Israel; we'll let the public hear the Israeli perspective, and it'll be up to the viewers to decide whether they're right. And on another occasion, If [Prime Minister] Benjamin Netanyahu or [Foreign Minister] Avigdor Lieberman do something which is perceived negatively, we will report it because we're a news network. On the other hand, of course, we'll seek to broadcast positive things about Israel and the Diaspora Jewry.

Peter Dickinson, the Kyiv-based editor-in-chief, was quoted saying:

We don't look at our channel as just being "news for Jews," it's a much wider enterprise than that, and I'm confident we'll get a lot of non-Jewish viewers coming by for the variety of our voice.

Jordana Miller, a former CNN reporter and former network’s Tel Aviv bureau chief, stated adamantly that JN1 will not become a "propaganda station." She added:

There's nothing about this network that will exclude, diminish, or cut off the Palestinian narrative when it comes to the conflict here.

And the European Jewish Union, of which JN1’s owners are the president and vice president, stated in a press release:

JN1's main objective is to create a world-class media platform dealing with important and relevant topics, alongside other international providers such as CNN, Al Jazeera, BBC World Service, France 24, and Russia Today.

== Organisation ==
=== Bureaus ===
JN1 had offices or studios in Brussels, Kyiv, and Tel Aviv, with its headquarters located in Brussels. The network had announced plans to open offices in other major world cities such as Washington D.C., London, Paris, Berlin, and Moscow; however, sources were not very consistent.

Bureau Chiefs:

- Alexander Zanzer (Brussels)
- Peter Dickinson (Kyiv)

=== Correspondents ===
- Sivan Raviv
- Ron Jacobsohn

JN1's Brussels-based spokesman said the network is in talks to hire additional correspondents, but did not elaborate.

=== Personnel ===
- Peter Dickinson (General Producer)
- Peter Dutczyn (Senior Editor)
- Valentyna Mala (General Director)

This information is sourced from the official website.

== Programming ==
=== Content ===
The JN1 broadcast was a 24-hour rolling news television network which was divided into Jewish-interest and world news loops. Content was continuously added and removed from these loops, and there is typically about one hour of footage at any given time. Each loop began with headlines, features news packages and interviews, and finished with a “global eye” video, which was news reported by images or video without narration. A yellow news ticker display at the bottom of the screen quickly reported major headlines for people who have just changed the channel or are not listening to the audio. There were no advertisements or commercial breaks in the broadcast.

=== Language ===
All programming was available in English and Russian.

== Availability ==
=== Cable ===
JN1 had plans to be available on cable television, and was viewable in the United States through cable outlets airing the JLTV cable channel.

=== Internet ===
The JN1 broadcast was available online via a live stream at JN1.TV. Some segments were also uploaded to their Jewish News One YouTube channel. There were also iPhone and Android apps available.

=== Satellite channels ===
Provider	Access	Available	Language	Package	Channel
Yes	(unconfirmed)	Israel	English		

It has been widely reported that JN1 would be available on Yes Satellite TV, but JN1 doesn't appear in their online channel listing.

=== Satellite coverage ===
Satellite	Coverage	Type	Language	Orbit	Beam	EIRP	C/N	Freq.	Pol.	TP	System	Encrypt	Comp.	Res.	SRate	FEC	SID	V_PID	A_PID
Astra 4A	Eurasia, Africa	FTA	English	4.8E	Ku, Europe BSS	51	5.5	11766	Hor.	B3	DVB-S	None	MPEG-2	SD	27500	3\4	6140	6141	6142
Galaxy 19	North America	FTA	English	97W	Ku	0		12053	Ver.	19	DVB-S	None			22000	3\4	1703	4022	4032
Hot Bird 6	Eurasia	FTA	English	13E	Ka, Ku	46-52	5.5	11034	Ver.	126	DVB-S	None	MPEG-2	SD	27500	3\4	1703	320	330

== Other coverage ==
As of Jan 1, 2013, a half an hour of JN1 would be broadcast on the MHz WorldView channel. MHZ Worldview is available in the United States via limited cable TV and over the air channels. It was also available via the web, Android/iPhone apps, as well as on Roku.

== Competitors ==
JN1’s most frequently discussed competitor was Al Jazeera English.

When contacted by The National, Al Jazeera's Ossama Saeed, head of international and media relations, had this to say about JN1:

We were the first on the scene 15 years ago and we have maintained our position as number one despite a lot of channels being launched since then. We'll continue what we're doing. We're not concerned about other [channels] popping up.

== See also ==
- i24news
