= Menorah Center, Dnipro =

Jewish center

Menorah Center
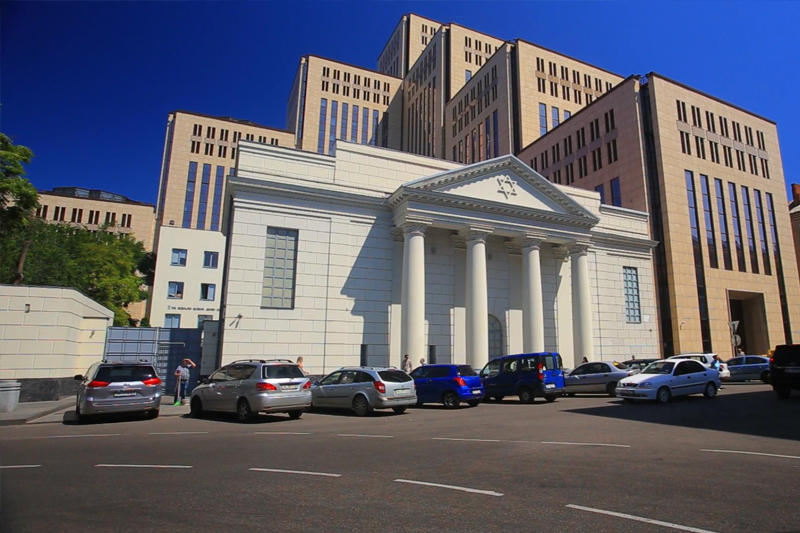
- "Menorah Center" general view with Golden Rose synagogue

Location
- Location: Sholom-Aleikhema St., 4/26, Dnipro, Dnipropetrovsk Oblast, Ukraine, 49000
- Interactive map of Menorah Center
- Coordinates: 48°27′50″N 35°03′12″E

Architecture
- Completed: 2012

The Menorah Center (Ukrainian: Центр "Менора") is a center of the Jewish community in Dnipro in the South-Eastern Ukraine. Some sources declare it to be the biggest multifunctional Jewish community center in Europe or in the world. The heart of the complex is the historic Golden Rose central synagogue, built in the 19th century.

== Conception ==
The idea to create the Menorah Center, as one of the biggest such centers in the world, was proposed by Rabbi Shmuel Kaminetsky and funded by the President of the Dnipropetrovsk Jewish community Gennadiy Bogolyubov and the President of the United Jewish Community of Ukraine (also the founder of European Jewish Union) Ihor Kolomoyskyi. They both provided full financial support for the project implementation. The supposed concept of the Menorah Center construction is to combine three functional elements (spirituality, culture and business) in one complex building. The Lubavitcher Rebbe, Menachem Mendel Schneerson, was born in Nikolayev, Ukraine, but raised in Dnipro (then known as Yekatrinoslav) where his father served as chief rabbi until his 1939 arrest by Soviet authorities.

== Dedication ==
The dedication ceremony of the Menorah Center took place on October 16, 2012, with guests that included Chief Rabbi of Ukraine Yaakov Bleich, Sephardic Chief Rabbi of Israel Shlomo Amar, Israel Minister of Information and Diaspora Yuli-Yoel Edelstein, Rabbi Moshe Kotlarsky, Rabbi Shmuel Rabinovitch, representatives of Jewish institutions (including Hillel, the Jewish Agency, the American Jewish Joint Distribution Committee), Ukrainian state and local authorities, and diplomatic corps.

== General description ==
The center is built in the shape of a seven-branched synagogue candelabrum (menorah). It consists of seven marble towers, the highest of which is 20 stories (77 m.) tall. The construction has a total floor area of about 50,000 sq.m. There are a synagogue, museums, office premises, shopping spaces, publishing house, art galleries, kosher restaurants and cafes, conference halls, banquet halls, a luxury hotel, youth hostel, classrooms, tourist information center, and visa center of Israel. The general project design was made by architect Alexander Sorin.

Signs and labels in Menorah are written in four languages - English, Ukrainian, Russian and Hebrew. The official address of the center is Sholom-Aleikhema St., 4/26, Dnipro, Dnipropetrovsk Oblast, 49000, Ukraine.

One of the center's declared priorities is to use business profits for funding charitable projects. The presumed purpose is to serve Jewish community of about 30,000 in Dnipro and its other population disregarding background.

== Opinions about the Menorah Center ==
- Rabbi Shmuel Kaminetsky — chief Rabbi of Dnipropetrovsk region:

The idea here is also to build a presence, a great beacon of light that tells the Jews of Ukraine: ‘We are here. Come join us. The time for hiding is over.

- Chaim Chesler — founder of Limmud in the former Soviet Union:

During my lifetime I have visited hundreds of Jewish sites throughout the world, but I have never seen such an extraordinary complex of buildings and I doubt if I will ever do so again.

- Beth Moskowitz — representative of Boston's Jewish Community Relation Council:

We all thought that there would be no Jews here today in 2012. And to see the amount of Jews that actually take part in the Menorah center and in the synagogue, in the Golden Rose synagogue, the activities here—it’s hard to believe. I actually think this is the center for Jewish community and the center for thriving and there has been an incredible revival.

== Activities ==
The business forum “Ukraine is a country of entrepreneurs” for young business people was hosted by the Menorah Center on November 24, 2016. More than 400 representatives of small and medium-size enterprises took part in that forum.

The Ukrainian Association of Patriots (UKROP Party) held there its conference and a general meeting of supporters from all over Ukraine in November, 2016.

Some Ukrainian Jewish refugees from armed conflict zone in Donetsk and Luhansk regions have used the Menorah Center facilities for resettlement and rehabilitation.

Following the 2022 Russian invasion of Ukraine, the Menorah Center has become a center for humanitarian aid to refugees who have fled the various battle zones. It was also said to have been sheltering its patron, Ihor Kolomoyskyi.

== Infrastructure ==
=== Synagogue ===
- Golden Rose central synagogue.

=== Museums ===
- Museum "Jewish Memory and Holocaust in Ukraine".

It is the largest Jewish complex in the former Soviet Union. It covers 3,000 sq.m. and use up-to-date technologies (multimedia installations, video and audio records broadcasts, hologram images). The museum has the information center, libraries, classrooms.

=== Research and Education Center ===
- Institute for the Study of Holocaust "Tkuma".

=== Hotels ===
- "Menorah Hotel" - 4-star international hotel.

The hotel is set up to enable guests to observe Shabbat, and says it is the only hotel in the former Soviet Union to do so.

- "7 Days City Hotel" - 16 rooms in minimalistic style.

=== Conference Halls ===
- "Sinai Hall".
- "Menorah Grand Hall".
- "Menorah Ballroom" .
- "Menorah Royal Club".
- "Conference Hall Small".
- "Pchelkine House".
- "Troitskaya Street Conference Hall".

=== Banquet Halls ===
- "Menorah Grand Hall".
- "Menorah Ballroom".
- "Menorah Grand Terrace".
- "Pchelkine House".
- "Menorah Cafe".

=== Art Gallery ===
- Gallery of modern and traditional art.

== Image gallery ==
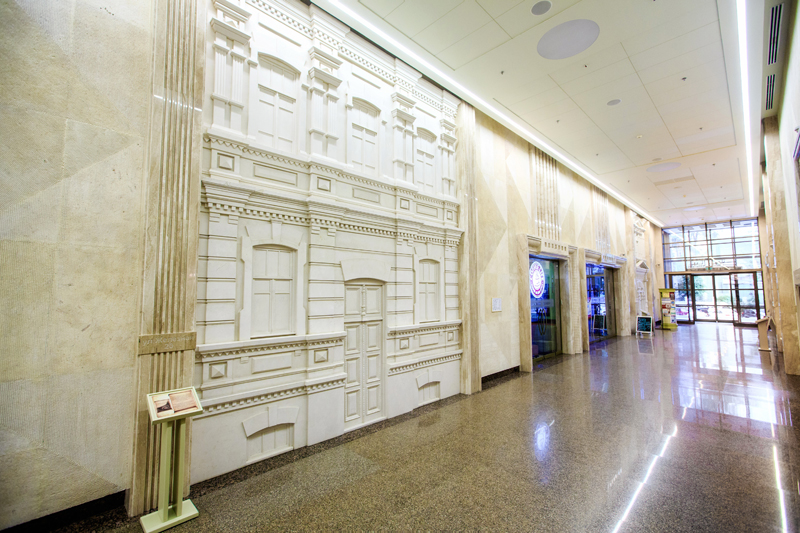
Gallery of "Menorah Center" (entrance from Uspenskaya square).

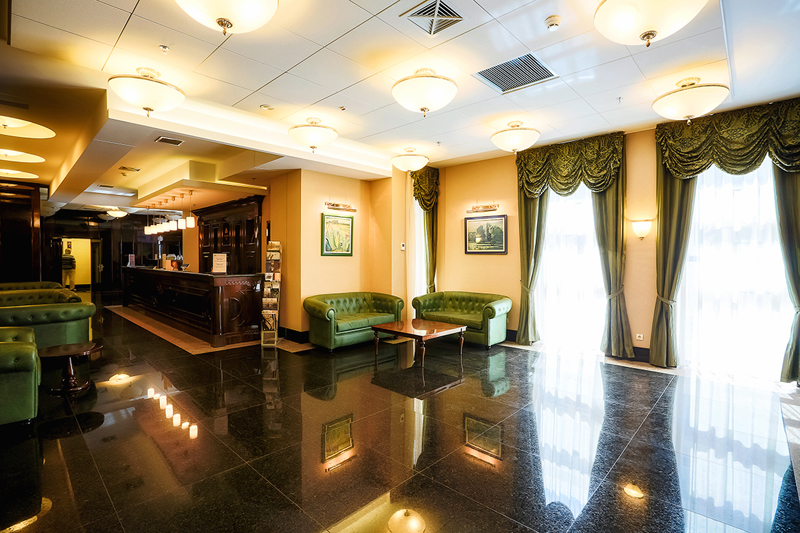
Reception of "Menorah Hotel".

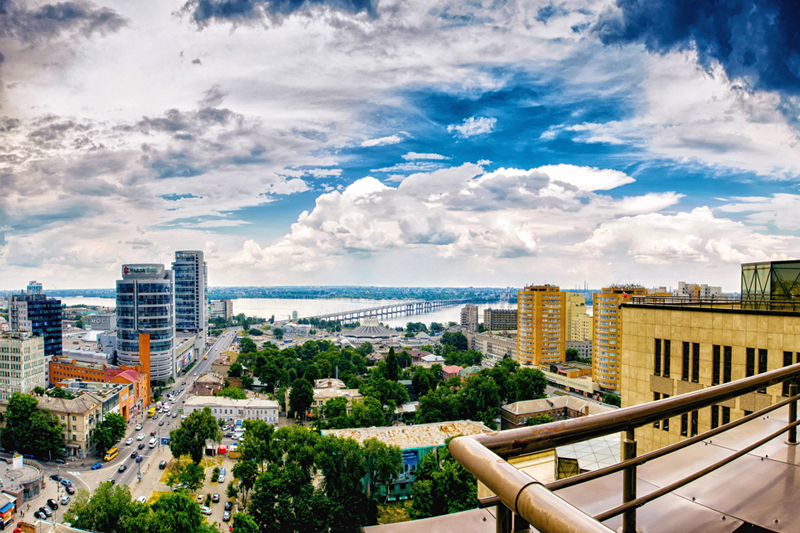
View from observation site of "Menorah Center".

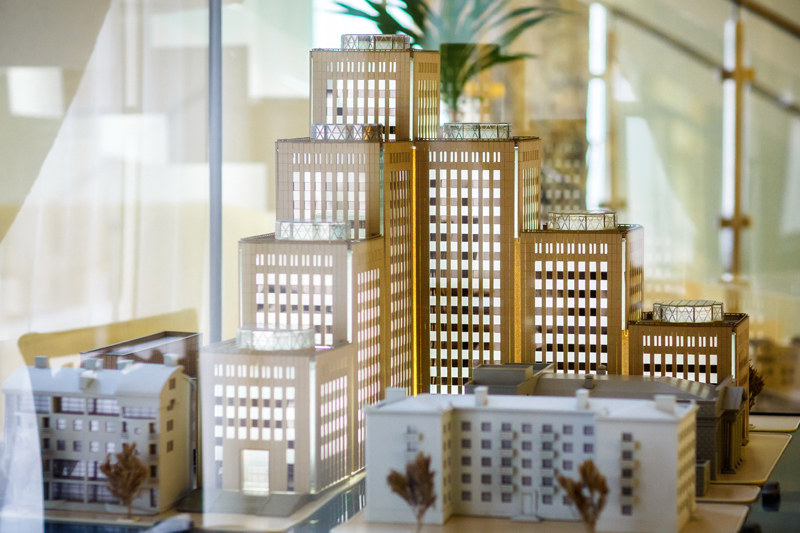
"Menorah Center" 3D model.

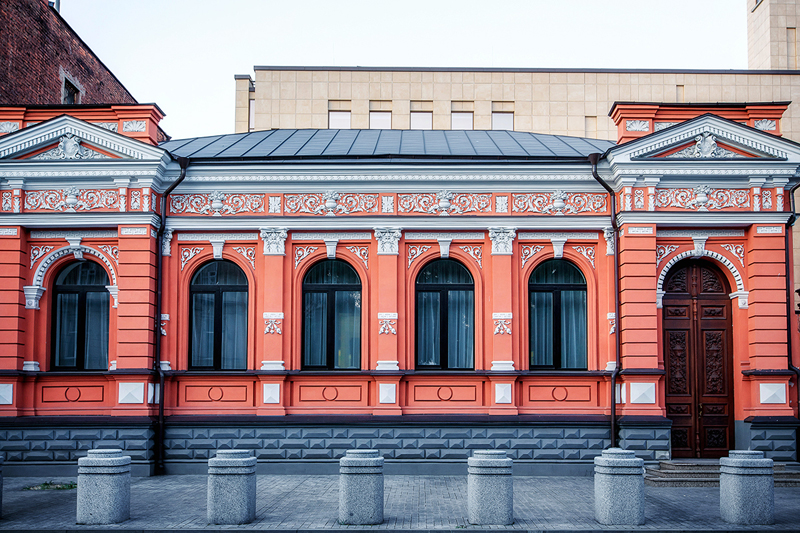
"Pchelkine House".
