= Nationalization of PrivatBank =

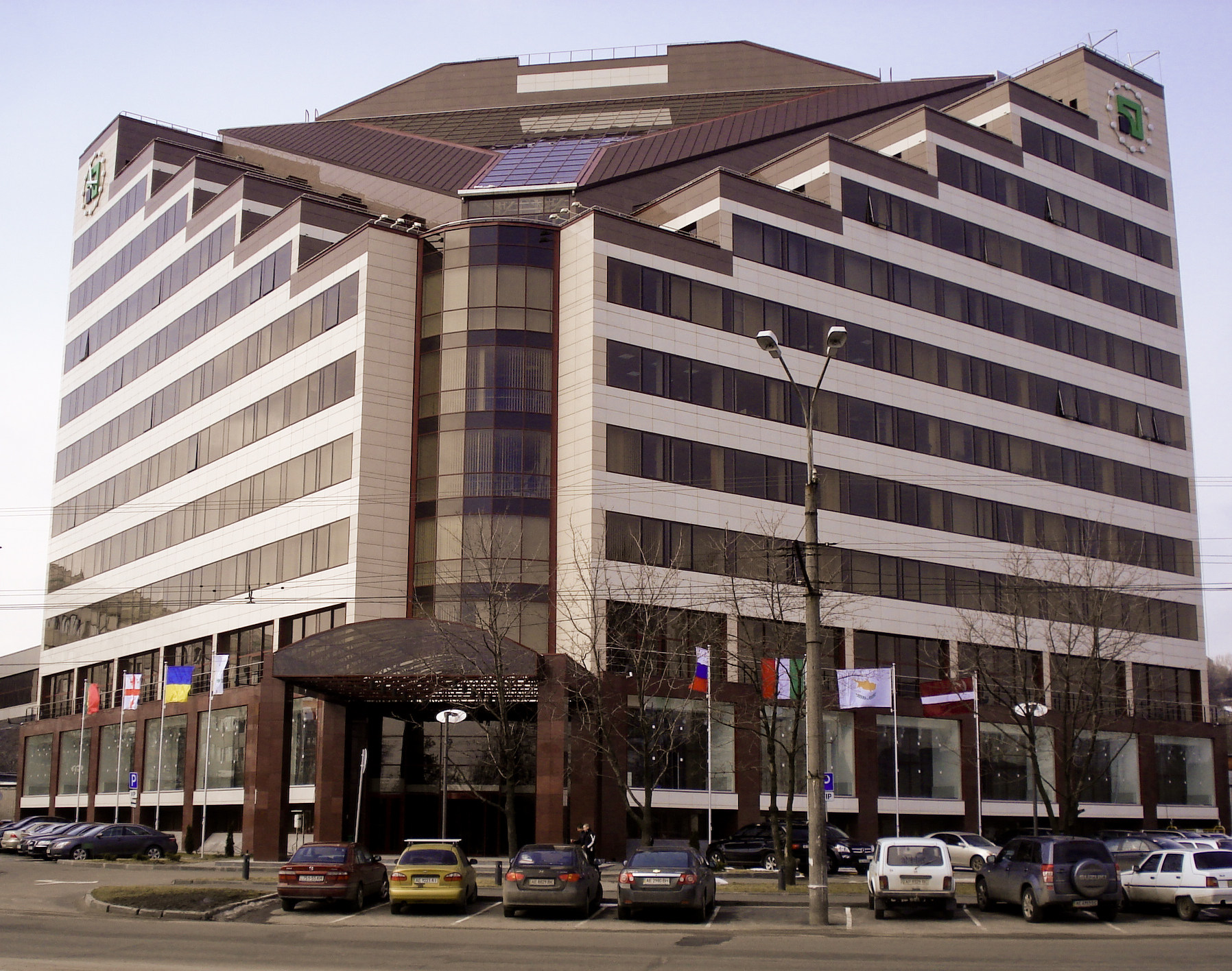
Head office of PrivatBank in Dnipro (2010)

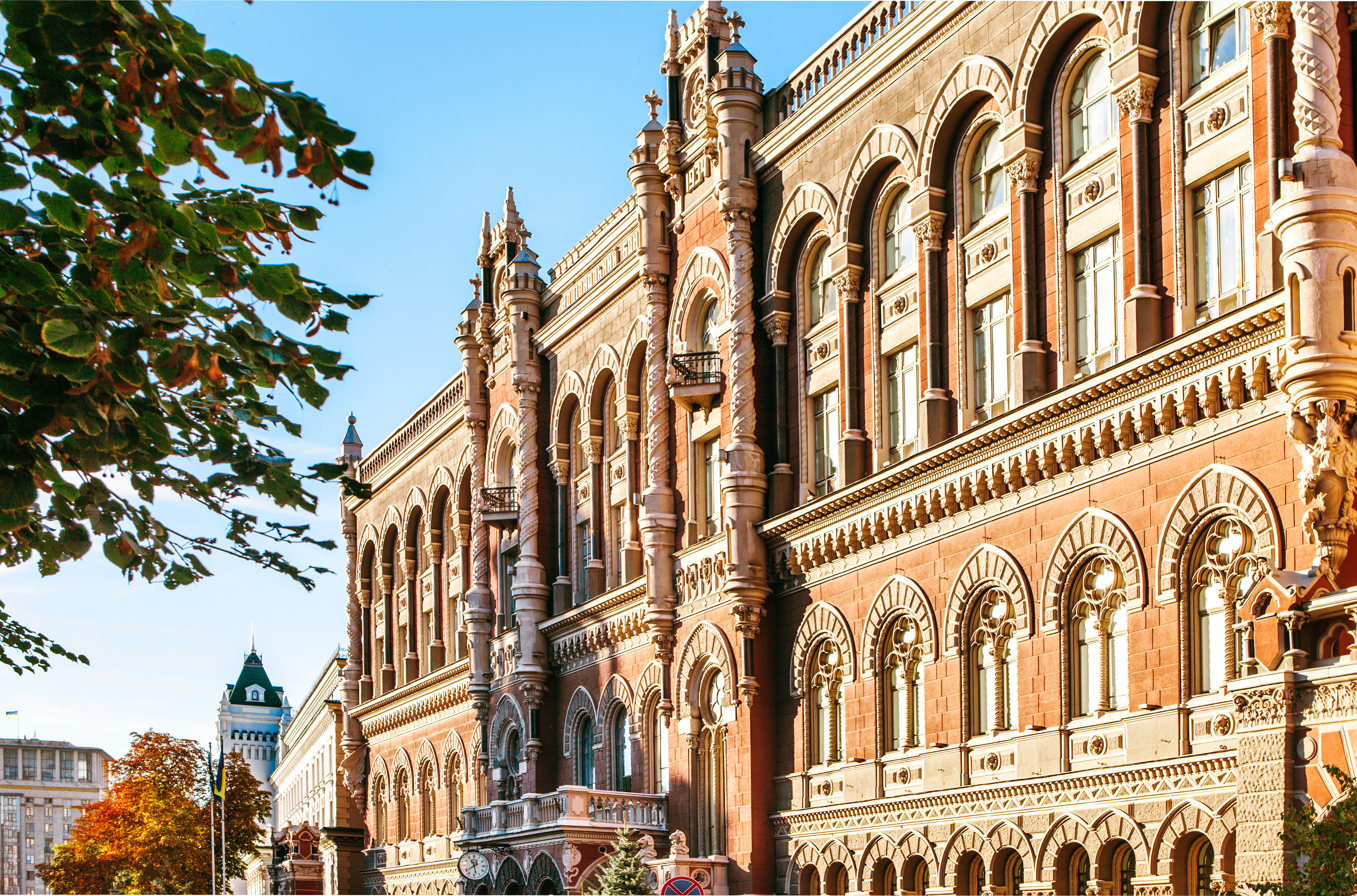
National Bank of Ukraine building in Kyiv (2016)

The nationalization of PrivatBank by the government of Ukraine, taking 100% ownership, occurred on 18 December 2016.

== History ==
PrivatBank was founded in 1992 by co-founders Ihor Kolomoiskyi who is also a co-founder of the financial and industrial Privat Group, and Hennadii Boholiubov, who both controlled 92% of the bank's shares before its nationalization by the state, while Serhii Tihipko was appointed as a manager. By the moment of bank's nationalization at the end of 2016 it had become the largest private bank in Ukraine. As of today, more than 22 million customers have opened their accounts in the bank; it serves about 60% of transactions and half of payment cards issued in Ukraine, and 40% of deposits of the entire banking system are concentrated in it.

Despite the dynamic growth of the retail banking sector, the National Bank of Ukraine recorded serious problems with the capital adequacy ratio, the loan portfolio, and the institution's compliance with the standards. After the bank's stress testing had been completed, the scale of problems that threatened the firmness of the entire banking system of Ukraine became obvious. In February 2016, the bank's shareholders agreed to transform the loan portfolio of the bank (transfer the debts to the bank to transparent, working businesses with real pledges, sufficient for servicing the loans) that would consequently reduce the bank's need for capital returning PrivatBank to the 5% framework of the capital adequacy. The ex-owners failed to meet the transformation deadline and to fully implement it. In February 2015, the National Council of Reforms identified eighteen priority reform areas, including a set of measures for reforming the financial sector of Ukraine (the Programme). The main goal of the Programme was to create a financial system able to redistribute efficiently financial resources in the economy based on the development of a full-fledged competitive environment according to the standards of the EU (including ensuring the firmness and reliability of the financial sector in the long run, making the standards of regulation of solvency and liquidity of banks comply with the recommendations of the Basel Committee)

== Effects of the financial crisis of 2014–2015 in Ukraine ==
In response to the crisis in the banking sector in 2014-2015, the NBU improved the legislative and monitoring tools and conducted the diagnostic exercises of the largest banks. By the end of November 2014, the NBU retooling had been completed to identify troubled banks at an early stage.

In April 2014, the Moody's Investors Service downgraded the ratings of PrivatBank and eleven other Ukrainian banks. In August 2014, the Standard & Poor's rating agency confirmed the long-term and short-term counterparty loan ratings of PrivatBank in the CCC/C scale. The Fitch downgraded the ratings of PrivatBank from CC/C to SD as a result of the debt (issued Eurobonds) restructuring agreement that had been signed.

Along with financial sustainability gaps in many Ukrainian banks, the NBU recorded serious problems with the PrivatBank's capital adequacy ratio, the loan portfolio, and the institution's compliance with the standards.

According to the financial statements of PrivatBank, which is quoted by the Fitch, the non-performing loans (NPL's) of the financial institution (overdue for more than ninety days) amounted to 8% of gross loans at the end of the first six months, which is significantly lower than the average for the banking system of Ukraine. It was said to be the result of regular write-offs and transfer of risks connected with the Crimea as well (in Q4 2014) into an unconsolidated structure controlled by the bank's shareholders. At the same time, the loans, devaluated on an individual basis and yet undue, remained at a noticeable level of 28% of all loans from the end of 2014 to the end of H1 2015. The coverage of the NPL's and devaluated on an individual basis with reserves was at a low level of 32% at the end of H1 2015.

‘Significant levels of concentration of borrowers and sectors (the largest segment in oil trade accounted for 19% of the loans) and a significant share of foreign currency lending (43%) to borrowers who mostly do not have currency income, are additional sources of repayment risk’, the Fitch analytical materials report. ‘The capital of the bank provides an insignificant ability to absorb losses, while the profit before deductions for impairment, adjusted for accrued income that is not paid in cash, is negative (for H1 2015, according to IFRS).

The bank's stress testing had shown that PrivatBank faced serious problems. The bank's systemic importance particularly complicated the situation. PrivatBank's potential liquidation as a result of the capital deficit and the risk of the bank's corporate debtors’ default would cause significant damage to the financial sector and the economy as a whole. The best option was a restructuring, and in February 2016, the NBU, the Board of PrivatBank, and its owners agreed on a Restructuring Plan (RP).

In February 2016, the bank's shareholders agreed to transform the loan portfolio of the bank (which was one of the issues of the RP) that would consequently reduce the bank's need for capital returning PrivatBank to the 5% framework of the capital adequacy.

Among different facts with capital inadequacy was that according to the ZN.ua journalists, the financial reports of the bank as of 1 January 2014 show that ₴102.6 billion (97.5%) of ₴105.5 billion of the bank's total corporate portfolio was provided to Dnipropetrovsk Oblast.

Another journalists (Skhemy) have analysed a draft business review of PrivatBank prepared by the Ernst & Young. According to the journalists’ investigation, the auditors have checked the biggest borrowers and found that as of 1 April 2015, the default risk amounted to over ₴82 billion, and as of 1 October 2016, the figure increased to more than ₴139 billion. According to the document, PrivatBank restructured its loan portfolio: the debt of 170 previous borrowers was transferred to more than 30 new ones making them owe the bank over ₴110 billion.

The concentration of the customer portfolio as of 31 December 2016:

The loan portfolio of PrivatBank, according to the balance sheet
Line	as of 16/12/2016, UAH billion	as of 1/1/2017, UAH billion	as of 1/7/2017, UAH billion
Loan portfolio, incl.:*	225	228	235
including loans to legal entities	192	196	196
including related parties	8 (4%)**	190 (97%)**	190 (97%)**
Loans to individuals	33	32	39
Provision for loan losses	-30	-184	-191

*Taking into account the accrued interest

**In accordance with the NBU's N9 ratio calculation method

Loans to related parties
Group	The number of borrowers	Total debt, UAH billion	including body, billion UAH	Including interest, billion UAH
Total	223	198.4*	187.2	11.2
Transformed loans	36	132.8	126.9	5.9
Leasing	41	14.7	14.5	0.2
Portfolio of the Cypriot branch	22	14.7	14.1	0.6
Corporate related loans	124	36.2	31.7	4.5

*Including ₴8.4 billion of devaluated interest rates to be charged

== The nationalization ==
In November 2016, the British specialized banking magazine bne IntelliNews conducted PrivatBank's loan portfolio analysis. Of all major borrowers of PrivatBank, journalists managed to identify only a few companies with real business. The well-known companies from the Privat Group account for about ₴10 billion, which is 5% of the bank's total loan portfolio. The rest of the bank's borrowers are offshore companies (8% of PrivatBank's loan portfolio, or ₴18 billion) and unknown LLCs, created in 2014–2016 and having strong connection with abroad and offshore businesses of ex-owners.

PrivatBank's press-service denied results of journalist investigations: ‘According to financial reports of PrivatBank for the Q1 2016, prepared in accordance with IFRS, the percentage of loans to related parties in the loan portfolio (before provisions) is 6.1%’, states the bank's response. At the same time, the violation of the norm N9, which, according to the press-service of PrivatBank, is 38.5%, was due to methodological changes in the ruling of the NBU. ‘The bank is working on making this indicator comply with the norm’, assured PrivatBank.

The bank management made up a RP and insider-loan contraction plan. A bank shareholder provided the personal guarantee for this programme, but it failed.

Valeriia Hontareva stated, ‘The audit of the NBU has found a capital shortage in PrivatBank. As of 1 April 2015, it amounted to ₴113 billion, as a result of the crisis in the Ukrainian economy and the improper lending policy of PrivatBank. Over 97% of the corporate portfolio, which amounted to ₴150 billion as of 1 April 2015 was loans to individuals related to the shareholders of the company.

The ex-owners sent letters to the Government and the NBU asking the government agencies to acquire a share in the bank's capital and undertake its sanation, while on their part, they guaranteed non-interference in the process and undertook to conduct the restructuring of the bank's loan portfolio to mid-2017 onwards. And by 18 December, the government had made a decision on the state's acquiring a share in the bank's capital.

PrivatBank's ex-owner Ihor Kolomoiskyi in his comments to TSN (which is the newsprogramme of his media group 1+1) confirmed his appealing to the government with a request for the bank's nationalisation, ‘...PrivatBank has become a victim of the NBU's tyranny. PrivatBank had a balanced secured loan portfolio, confirmed by the international audit. However, the NBU, by constantly changing its own standards, invented more and more ways to artificially reduce the bank's capitalisation. Then they began talking about a mythical ₴150 billion hole, 97% of related loans, and all the money having been stolen or siphoned offshore. Although they obtained all of those figures as a result of arbitrary changes in accounting policies. Sound central banks help banks in difficult times, such as economic crises, occupation, or war, whereas our regulator used all the possible tricks to pin PrivatBank down. And, unfortunately, he managed to do it...’

However, the ex-owners never implemented restructuring the bank's corporate portfolio as had been agreed, and in July 2017, the state resorted to the procedure of judicial recovery of pledges from the loan portfolio debtors. The General Prosecutor's Office of Ukraine, the National Anti-Corruption Bureau of Ukraine, and the Specialised Anti-Corruption Prosecutor's Office have started several investigations related to PrivatBank and ex-owners.

According to the financial statements of the bank verified by the Ernst & Young auditors, as of 31/12/2016, the provision for impairment of loans to legal entities was increased by ₴155.9 billion. The Ernst & Young independent auditor's report concluded that the auditor had confirmed the low quality of the loan portfolio of PrivatBank, however, had not confirmed the financial results and cash-flows of the bank due to the fact that he had not been able to obtain sufficient audit evidence for the period of devaluation of loans and advances to clients. Such a conclusion suggests that PrivatBank had started experiencing financial problems long before 2016.

Moreover, according to the regulator, the auditors determined the need for the creation of additional provisions of ₴10 billion, which eventually led to PrivatBank's negative balance sheet value of ₴882 million as of the end of 2016.

Moreover, in January 2018, the Kroll's (a company that provides consulting services and investigates cases of fraud, bribery, and corruption) investigation results were published, which confirmed that before the nationalisation, PrivatBank had been the subject of large-scale and coordinated fraudulent actions, resulting in losses of at least $5.5 billion. Findings of the investigation:

1. Siphoning off the funds to acquire assets and finance the businesses of the ex-shareholders and their affiliated persons.
2. Hiding the funds’ sources of origin by the ex-owners. Concealing the sources and the real purpose of loans, the lack of a substantiated link between the person who repays the loan and the original borrower, as well as the widespread use of offshore companies.
3. A bank within a bank. The ex-owners of the bank created a shadow banking structure within PrivatBank. It ensured conducting payments and contributed to the flow of funds in favour of parties related to the former shareholders. This secret scheme involved hundreds of employees of PrivatBank.
4. The structure and management of loans. The shadow banking structure managed the corporate loan portfolio of related parties. It controlled the provision of new loans that were commonly used to repay the principal and interest of related parties’ existing loans (cyclical re-lending). It provided transactions to hide the source and true purpose of loan funds, creating the impression of being a regular customer-oriented bank.
5. The balance. Before the December 2016 nationalisation, over 95% of the corporate loan portfolio was provided to parties related to former shareholders and groups of affiliated persons. At the end of 2016, 75% of the loan portfolio was consolidated in loans to thirty-six borrowers related to former shareholders and groups of affiliated persons. Most of them are not repaid and are overdue, resulting in the bank's losses amounting to at least $5.5 billion.

Oleksandr Danyliuk, ex-Minister of Finance of Ukraine: ‘To a certain moment, the money of PrivatBank was exclusively the money of its depositors... And these deposits were used to lend the business of the group, for the purposes of its owners. In the end, this resulted in certain problems, and the state was forced to intervene and protect the depositors...’

NBU also filed claim to court of Cyprus against PwC seeking $3 billion compensation.

Hennadii Boholiubov, former co-owner of the bank, sent the government of Ukraine a notice claiming compensation for the ‘illegal expropriation’ of his share of funds in PrivatBank. In his address, he described the circumstances under which PrivatBank worked during 2015–2016, indicating that it was the most capitalised bank by the end of 2015. Boholiubov noted that during October–December 2016, the National Bank of Ukraine drastically changed its requirements to the bank, putting it intentionally under pressure. In his opinion, Ukraine was waging a successful and coordinated media campaign to destabilise the situation with PrivatBank, followed by the nationalisation of the financial institution. However, he did not specify the total amount of claims, while clarifying that in case of refusal, he, as a citizen of the United Kingdom, would apply to an independent arbitral tribunal.

== Nationalisation results ==
Today, PrivatBank is a fully recapitalized state-owned bank. On 25 April 2017, the S&P reported an increase in credit ratings of PrivatBank from SD to CCC+/C and stated the bank's rating outlook as “a stable". The Moody's also raised ratings of PrivatBank—from Caa3 to Caa2.

Meanwhile, more than 400 lawsuits have been filed against the NBU in Ukraine.

State-owned PrivatBank in December 2017 filed a lawsuit to the High Court of Justice in England against Kolomoisky, Boholiubov, as well as the companies Teamtrend Ltd., Trade Point Agro Ltd., Collyer Ltd., Rossyan Investing Corp., Milbert Ventures Inc. and ZAO Ukrtransitservice Ltd., which allegedly belong to them or are under their control.

The court, as an interim measure, issued a ruling for the worldwide seizure of the assets of the former owners of the bank, Kolomoisky and Boholiubov and the said six companies, for more than $2.5 billion.

The court obliged Kolomoisky and Boholiubov to disclose information about all their assets to a limited circle of people who are taking part in the hearing of the lawsuit.

A new banking law approved by Ukraine's parliament in April 2020 was designed to prevent Kolomoisky and Boholiubov from regaining control of PrivatBank.

In July 2022, the Ukrainian national bank announced that the Supreme Court had ruled the nationalization was valid.
