= Ihor Kolomoyskyi =

Ukrainian-born businessman (born 1963)

- Ігор Коломойський
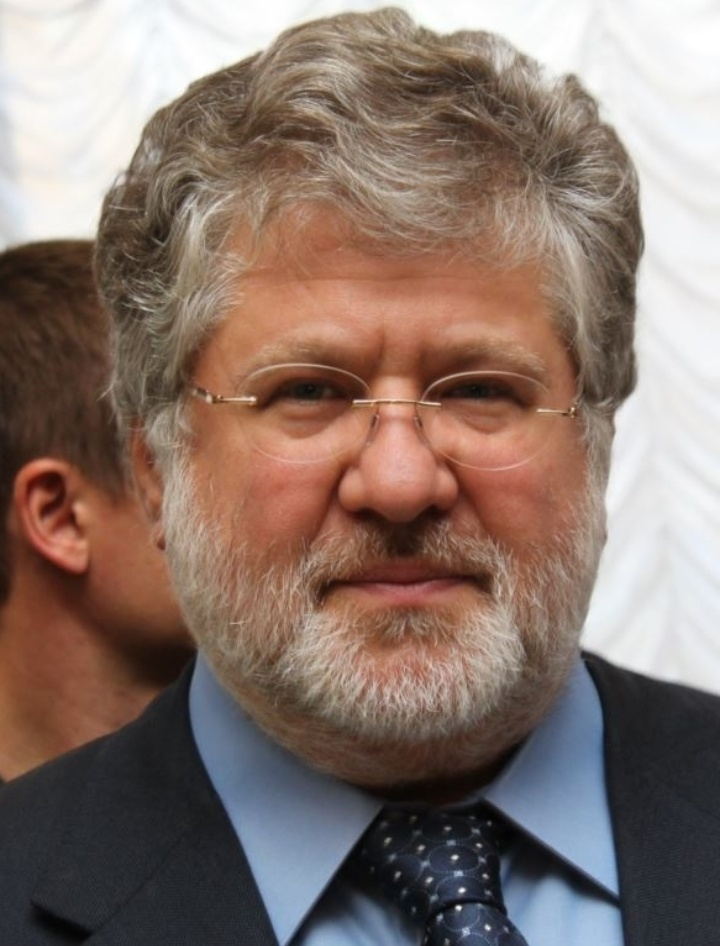
- Kolomoyskyi in 2014
- Born: 13 February 1963 (age 63); Dnipropetrovsk, Ukrainian SSR, Soviet Union (now Dnipro, Ukraine)
- Other name: Igor Kolomoisky
- Citizenship: Israel
- Education: Dnipropetrovsk Metallurgical Academy
- Occupations: Businessman, politician
- Known for: Former co-owner of PrivatBank; Former owner of former FC Dnipro
- Spouse: Irina Kolomoyskaya
- Children: 2

Governor of Dnipropetrovsk Oblast
- In office 2 March 2014 – 24 March 2015
- Preceded by: Dmytro Kolesnikov
- Succeeded by: Valentyn Reznichenko (acting)

Ihor Valeriyovych Kolomoyskyi (Ukrainian: Ігор Валерійович Коломойський; Hebrew: איגור קולומויסקי; born 13 February 1963) is a Ukrainian-born Israeli billionaire businessman, once considered the leading oligarch in Ukraine.

Already an entrepreneur in the last years of Soviet Ukraine, in 2010 Kolomoyskyi was rated as the second richest person in Ukraine, and as one of the country's most influential oligarchs. In 1992, he co-founded PrivatBank and its informal stable of companies, Privat Group. He subsequently acquired extensive media holdings. From 2014 till 2015, Kolomoyskyi served as Governor of Dnipropetrovsk Oblast until his dismissal by President Petro Poroshenko. In 2016, his undercapitalised bank was declared a threat to Ukraine's financial security and taken into state ownership. In 2019, Kolomoyskyi's media power and funding supported Volodymyr Zelenskyy's successful presidential campaign to unseat Poroshenko.

In 2020, he was indicted in the United States on charges related to large-scale bank fraud. In 2021, the U.S. banned Kolomoyskyi and his family from entering the country, accusing him of corruption and being a threat to the Ukrainian public's faith in democratic institutions. Zelenskyy reportedly stripped Kolomoyskyi of his Ukrainian citizenship in 2022. Later that same year, those of Kolomoyskyi's assets deemed to be of strategic value to the state in light of the Russian invasion were nationalised. These included Ukraine's largest gasoline companies. In 2023, Kolomoyskyi was arrested by the Security Service of Ukraine (SBU) on charges of money laundering and fraud, and placed under pre-trial arrest.

== Name ==
Kolomoyskyi uses the nickname Benya (Russian: Беня), an invocation of the infamous Ukrainian (and Jewish) criminal reprobate Benya Krik, popularly fictionalized in Isaac Babel's Odessa Stories. Occasionally, Kolomoyskyi is called Bonifatsiy (the eponymous star of the popular Soviet cartoon "Каникулы Бонифация" (Bonifacy's holidays by Soyuzmultfilm).

== Early life and education ==
Kolomoyskyi was born into a Jewish family in Dnipropetrovsk, Ukrainian SSR, Soviet Union. Both parents had graduated in engineering. His mother worked at the university and father in a metallurgical plant. Already in his childhood he was considered to be very determined, diligent and serious, was enthusiastic about sports, and liked to play chess. Professionally, he followed the example of his parents. After graduating from the Gymnasium 21 in Dnipro with the Komsomol badge "For outstanding school performance", in 1980 he took up graduate studies in engineering at the Leonid Brezhnev Dnipropetrovsk Metallurgical Institute (now the National Metallurgical Academy of Ukraine), graduating in 1985.

As a Komsomol activist, Kolomoyskyi was involved in the so-called "disco movement"—an attempt by the authorities to promote an ideological safe alternative to the growing, underground, rebroadcast and performance of "Anglo-American" rock music including, in the 80s, heavy metal and punk. Kolomoyskyi used his role in organising approved dance venues and concerts to begin his trading career, as did others in his position, several of whom would go on to play prominent roles in post-Soviet national politics, among them Yulia Tymoshenko, Victor Pinchuk, Serhiy Tihipko, and Oleksandr Turchynov.

== Business career ==
In 1986, Kolomoyskyi found work in the Fianit trading cooperative.

In 1990, with two other graduates from Dnipropetrovsk universities, Gennadiy Bogolyubov and Oleksiy Martynov, Kolomoyskyi created a joint enterprise marketing office equipment bought in Moscow. After the collapse of the USSR, the partners, joined by the son of a major Soviet entrepreneur, Leonid Miloslavsky, began to import foreign goods – from sneakers and sportswear to telephones. To pay for the imports, Kolomoyskyi arranged the export of steel products. Soon they realized the greater profits to be made in internationally trading the locally sourced ores and metal. Among other operations, their Privat group supplied fuel to the mining company Pokrov (Ordzhonikidze) mineral processing combine, receiving in return manganese ore for export.

In 1991, together with Leonid Miloslavsky, Oleksiy Martynov, and Hennadiy Boholyubov, he founded Sentosa Ltd, which transported and resold goods and equipment from Moscow to Dnipropetrovsk. Later, petroleum products were imported, they expanded into ferroalloy, supplied Ordzhonikidze GOK (later Pokrov Mining and Processing Plant GOK) with fuel, and received manganese ore for further export under barter agreements.

In March 1992, the four companies of the Privat Group established Privatbank CJSC. Unlike state-owned banks, Privat willingly served private entrepreneurs and in 1995 participated aggressively in the voucher scheme for the privatization of state assets. With the blessing of Prime Minister Leonid Kuchma (also from Dnipro, and whose successful presidential campaign in 1994 Kolomoyskyi and his partners later funded), PrivatBank was also the only Ukrainian lender to receive permission from the National Bank of Ukraine to open overseas branches. One branch in Latvia, established in 1992, was later implicated in the 2014 Moldovan bank fraud scandal. The operations of a second, opened in the late 1990s in Cyprus, helped precipitate the nationalization of PrivatBank in 2016.

Between 1999 and 2003, Kolomoyskyi gained control of Ukrnafta, Kalinin Coke and Chemical Plant, Ozerka market in Dnipropetrovsk, Nikopol Ferroalloy Plant, and other companies. Through Privat Group, whose board he chaired from 1997, Kolomoyskyi controlled, at various points in the early 2000s, three Ukrainian airlines: Aerosvit Airlines, Dniproavia, Donbassaero. All went bankrupt. Through the asset management company Mansvell Enterprises Limited, he controlled a further three Scandinavian airlines, Skyways Express, City Airline, and Cimber Sterling each of which again, within a few years, filed for bankruptcy and ceased operations.

As of 2008, other fields of activity in Ukraine as well as in Russia and Romania included: ferroalloys, finance, oil products, and mass media.

Kolomoyskyi's media assets were initially controlled by Glavred media holding, which owns Information Agency UNIAN, the weekly magazine Profile, and newspapers Novaya Gazeta and Gazeta po-Kievsky. In early September 2007, Ronald Lauder announced that Kolomoyskyi had acquired a 3% stake, and was on the board of directors of, Central European Media Enterprises. In April 2010, through his wholly owned Harley Trading Limited company, for around $300 million Kolomoyskyi secured control of one of Ukraine's largest media conglomerates, 1+1 Media Group, which operates eight Ukrainian TV channels.

In November 2019, The New York Times reported that Kolomoyskyi was behind plans to build a controversial ski resort in Svydovets, Ukraine, and quoted a professor at a local university describing Kolomoyskyi as "a leech who sucks our blood here and puts it in Switzerland."

== Wealth ==
As of 2007, Kolomoyskyi was a billionaire listed by Forbes as the 799th-richest man in the world with 3.8 billion dollars. In 2010 Kyiv Post estimated his wealth at $6.243 billion. In March 2012 Forbes placed him 377th with $3 billion. In 2010 Kyiv Post listed Kolomoyskyi as the second richest person in Ukraine; in 2012 Forbes rated him the third richest person in Ukraine (after Rinat Akhmetov and/or Viktor Pinchuk).

In March 2015, after the sharp decline in the value of the Ukrainian hryvnia, The Economist listed his net worth as $1.36 billion. In 2019, the Ukrainian magazine Focus placed Kolomoyskyi third on a list of the 100 most influential Ukrainians.

== Activities in the Jewish community ==
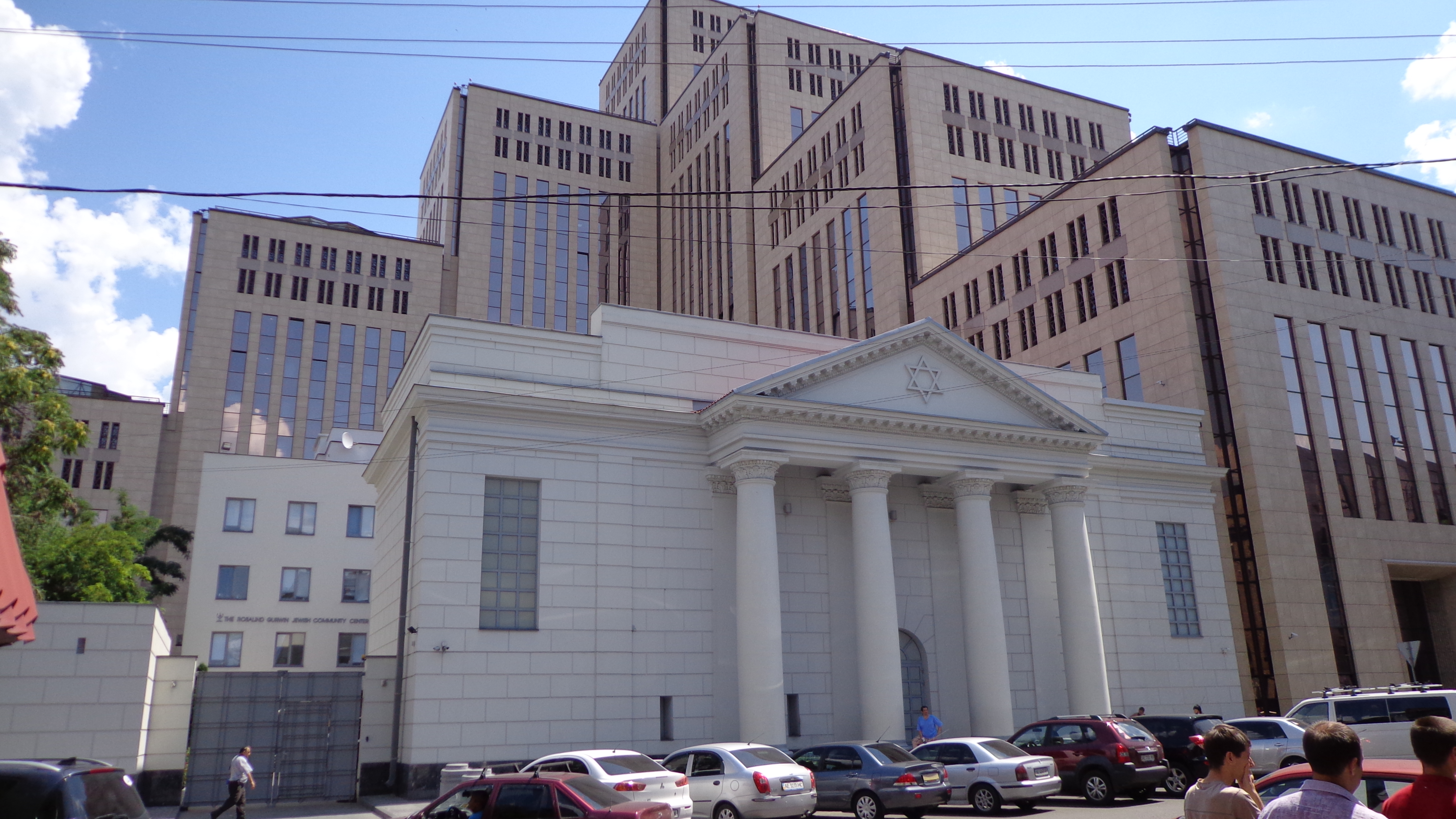
Synagogue and Menorah Center

Kolomoyskyi has been a prominent figure in Ukraine's organised Jewish community. In 2008, he was elected the President of "the United Jewish community of Ukraine" in Kyiv. He became a major funder in Ukraine of the Chabad movement, which has Ukrainian roots.

In 2012, with Gennady Bogolubov and Victor Pinchuk, he financed construction of what purports to be the largest multifunctional Jewish Community Center in Europe, the Menorah Centre, in downtown Dnipro. Comprising seven marble towers (of which the highest is 20 stories) arranged in the shape of a menorah, it houses a synagogue, two hotels, kosher restaurant and grocery store and Jewish Memory and Holocaust Museum.

In 2010 in Berlin, after promising the outgoing president he would donate $14 million, Kolomoyskyi was appointed as the president of the European Council of Jewish Communities (ECJC). Some western European ECJC board members described his elevation as a "putsch" and a "Soviet-style takeover". After several resigned in protest, Kolomoyskyi quit the ECJC and, together with fellow Ukrainian oligarch Vadim Rabinovich, founded the European Jewish Union in April 2011.

Launched by Kolomoyskyi and Rabinovich at Disneyland Paris, the EJU subsequently styled itself the European Jewish Parliament. Modelled on the Israeli Knesset with 120 members, its declared aim is to represent the concerns of the Jewish community to the European Union. The Brussels-based initiative, with which Kolomoyskyi no longer appears to be associated, has been opposed by much of the established Jewish community leadership.

== Allegations and charges of corruption ==
=== Nationalisation of PrivatBank ===
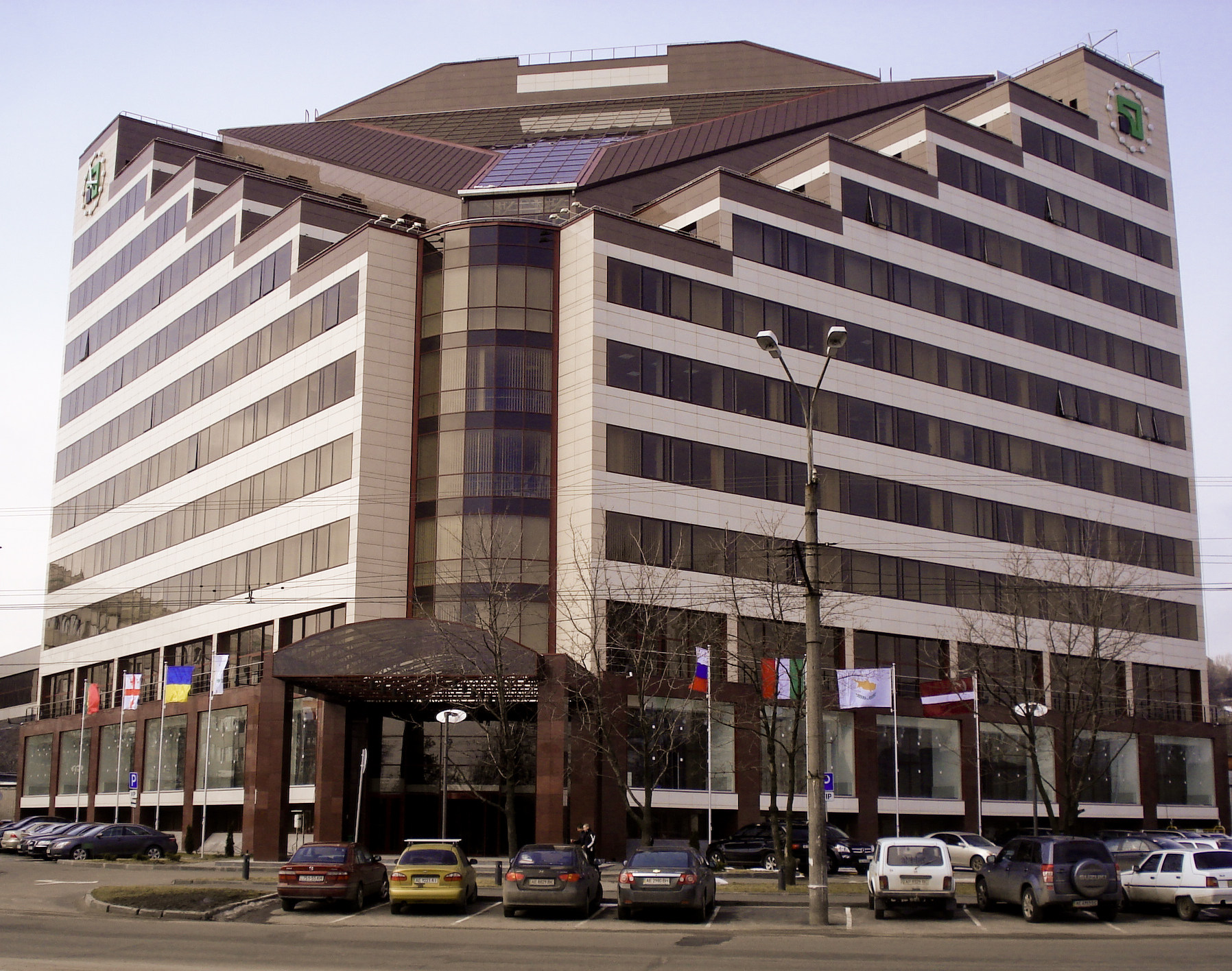
PrivatBank head office in Dnipro, 2010

Beginning in 2010, rumors circulated that Kolomoyskyi's assets were coming under pressure from the Ukrainian authorities and that he was spending increasingly more time in Switzerland.

In September 2013, Kolomoyskyi was criticized by Mr Justice Mann in a court case in London involving an attempted hostile takeover in October 2010 of Alexander Zhukov's JKX Oil and Gas Company, (Note: Zhukov has been dominate in JKX Oil and Gas since the 1980s when it held a monopoly on oil exports from the port of Odesa. In 2006, Zhukov owned a 25.88% stake in JKX Oil and Gas.) (Note: In 2008, Alexander Zhukov's daughter Daria Zhukova (Russian: Дарья Жукова) was Roman Abramovich's girlfriend.) The judge noted that Kolomoyskyi had "a reputation of having sought to take control of a company at gunpoint in Ukraine" and that a finance director considered she had "strong grounds for doubting the honesty of Mr Kolomoyskyi".

In 2015, Victor Pinchuk brought a $2 billion civil action against Kolomoyskyi and Gennadiy Bogolyubov in the High Court of Justice in London over the 2004 purchase of a Ukrainian mining company. Allegations made include murder and bribery. In January 2016 an undisclosed out-of-court settlement was reached just before the trial was due to start.

From 1 April 2016, "1+1" media group ceased all TV broadcasts. According to Ruslan Bortnik, director of the Ukrainian Institute of Analysis and Policy Management, unable to find external sponsors and faced with the determination of the Ukrainian government to secure own television presence, the TV project was proving unprofitable for Kolomoyskyi. Other projects, like Kolomoyskyi Football Club Dnipro where the players were not receiving their pay, were also in difficulty. Through Privat Group, Kolomoyskyi also had an interest in Budivelnyk Kyiv. In 2019, after being relegated FC Dnipro was dissolved.

In 2016, Kolomoyskyi and his business partner Gennadiy Bogolyubov were accused of defrauding Ukraine's largest bank PrivatBank of billions of dollars through large unsecured loans to shareholders. Between mid-2015 and mid-2016, the bank had handed out over US$1 billion in loans to firms owned by seven top managers and two subordinates of Kolomoyskyi. The Bank of Italy meanwhile shut down the Italian branch of Latvian lender AS PrivatBank after finding breaches of money-laundering regulations. Valeria Hontareva, the former chairwoman of Ukraine's central bank, characterised Kolomoyskyi and Boholiubov operation PrivatBank as one of the biggest financial scandals of the 21st century. "Large-scale coordinated fraudulent actions of the bank shareholders and management caused a loss to the state of at least $5.5 billion," Hontareva said in March 2018. "This is 33 percent of the population's deposits … [and] 40 percent of our country's monetary base". A key mechanism appears to have been the PrivatBank subsidiary in Cyprus which the Ukrainian regulator treated as if it was just another of the bank's domestic branches.

In December 2016, declaring that Kolomoyskyi's bank was severely undercapitalized and a threat to the country's financial system, the Ukrainian government nationalized the lender, then the largest in Ukraine. A $5.6 billion bailout was financed with IMF funds. In 2018, the now nationalized PrivatBank brought a lawsuit against Kolomoyskyi and Bogolyubov in the High Court in London and secured a worldwide freeze on their assets. The High Court ruled that it had no jurisdiction, but in 2019 the judgment was overturned on appeal, with the UK Supreme Court finding that the $3 billion claim against the former owners of the bank can be heard in a London court.

In April 2019, a Ukrainian court ruled that the nationalization of PrivatBank was illegal. Ukraine's central bank said it would not be possible to reverse the nationalisation and that it would appeal the decision. Kolomoyskyi stated that he has no interest in taking back control of the bank but sought $2bn in compensation for losses he insists were incurred during the nationalisation. On 14 February 2017 PrivatBank was liquidated.

In the summer of 2022, the Economic Court of Kyiv and the Supreme Court of Ukraine affirmed the legality of the National Bank of Ukraine's actions in taking PrivatBank into government control. In 2024, the Cassational Court also rejected final appeals of the case.

=== U.S. investigations and blacklisting ===
In April 2019 it was reported the FBI was investigating Kolomoyskyi over financial crimes involving Gennadiy Bogolyubov, the Kryvyi Rih businessman Vadim Shulman and Mordechai "Motti" Korf of Florida in relation to Kolomoyskyi steel holdings in West Virginia and northern Ohio in the United States and his mining interests in Ghana and Australia. Legal filings from American prosecutors in 2019 detailed how Kolomoyskyi used his control of Ukraine's largest retail bank, PrivatBank, to loot staggering sums from Ukrainian depositors, and via a series of shell companies and offshore accounts whisked the money out of the country and into the U.S.

In August 2020, the United States Department of Justice (DOJ) in the Southern District of Florida (Miami) alleged that Kolomoyskyi, Bogolyubov, Mordechai Korf, and Uriel Lader collectively obtained numerous properties as part of a $5.5 billion Ponzi scheme as "an international conspiracy to launder money embezzled and fraudulently obtained from PrivatBank," which was nationalized in 2016 to prevent a collapse of the Ukrainian equivalent to the United States' FDIC, while using PrivatBank's "Cyprus branch... as a washing machine for the stolen loan funds."

In April 2021, Kolomoyskyi and his wife and children were banned from entering the U.S. The United States Department of State accused him of corruptly using his time as Governor of Dnipropetrovsk to personally enrich himself. He was "involved in corrupt acts that undermined rule of law and the Ukrainian public's faith in their government's democratic institutions and public processes, including using his political influence and official power for his personal benefit." In his statement, Secretary of State Antony Blinken said:

While this designation is based on acts during his time in office, I also want to express concern about Kolomoyskyy's current and ongoing efforts to undermine Ukraine's democratic processes and institutions, which pose a serious threat to its future.

In January 2022, the DOJ announced that it had filed a civil forfeiture complaint against Kolomoyskyi in the U.S. District Court for the Southern District of Florida, alleging that "more than $6 million in proceeds from the sale of commercial real estate in Dallas, Texas . . . are subject to forfeiture based on violations of federal money laundering statutes". This was the fourth such action filed by the DOJ in connection with the same alleged criminal activity: the laundering of funds illegally obtained from PrivatBank through multimillion-dollar U.S. property investments.

== Political engagement in Ukraine ==
Kolomoyskyi opposed the presidential ambitions and government of Viktor Yanukovych and his broadly pro-Russian Party of Regions. He had been an ally of Yanukovych's predecessor as president, former central bank governor Viktor Yushchenko, helping to finance Yushchenko's Our Ukraine–People's Self-Defense Bloc. He also supported Yulia Tymoshenko and her bloc of political parties, Bloc Yulia Tymoshenko. In the 2012 Ukrainian parliamentary election Kolomoyskyi was seen by the Ukrainian Democratic Alliance for Reform's critics as standing behind the UDAR's Vitali Klitschko, although the party denied he was a sponsor.

=== Governor of Dnipropetrovsk ===
==== Confrontation with Putin ====
After the events of Euromaidan forced the resignation of Yanukovych in February 2014, acting President Oleksandr Turchynov appointed Kolomoyskyi Governor of Dnipropetrovsk Oblast. Kolomoyskyi responded to the then-beginning 2014 pro-Russian unrest in Ukraine by saying, "I don't understand how Ukrainians and Russians can fight," before blaming Yanukovych and President of Russia Vladimir Putin for the unrest, referring to the latter as a "schizophrenic of short stature," (Note: Alternatively translated as "schizophrenic dwarf.") and accused him of having a "messianic drive" to recreate the Russian Empire or the Soviet Union, which he said would plunge the world into catastrophe.

Two days later, Russian president Vladimir Putin described Kolomoyskyi as a "unique crook". According to Putin, Kolomoyskyi "even managed to cheat our Roman Abramovich two or three years ago. Scammed him, as our intellectuals like to say. They signed some deal, Abramovich transferred several billion dollars, while this guy never delivered and pocketed the money. When I asked him [Abramovich]: 'Why did you do it?' he said: 'I never thought this was possible'".

Kolomoyskyi initially dismissed suggestions of separatism in Dnipropetrovsk. However, his then-deputy, Borys Filatov argues that Kolomoyskyi, as governor, proceeded to do "a great deal to prevent the so-called Russian Spring taking over" in the region. In April, Kolomoyskyi offered a bounty for the capture of Russian-backed militants and incentives for the turning in of weapons. On 3 June 2014, Kolomoiskyi offered a $500,000 reward for the delivery of Oleg Tsaryov, a leader of the separatists, to the law enforcement agencies of Ukraine. He drafted thousands of Privat Group employees as auxiliary police officers. Kolomoyskyi is also believed to have spent $10 million to create the Dnipro Battalion, and to have provided funds for the Aidar, Azov, and Donbas volunteer battalions.

Filatov concedes that these extraordinary measures were in Kolomoyskyi's interest, since the Russians would have seized his assets. Following their 2014 annexation of Crimea, the Russian authorities nationalised Kolomoyskyi's Crimean properties, including a civil airport. According to the pro-Russian Crimean leader Sergey Aksyonov the move was "totally justified due to the fact that he [Kolomoyskyi] is one of the initiators and financiers of the special anti-terrorist operation in the Eastern Ukraine where Russian citizens are being killed". In response, in January 2016, Kolomoyskyi filed a complaint against Russia at the Permanent Court of Arbitration.

The Russians maintained that the intergovernmental court has no jurisdiction over the matter and refused to participate in proceedings. They responded with their own charges against Kolomoyskyi, accusing him, in his support for Ukrainian resistance to Russian-backed separatists in the Dontesk and Luhansk, of "organizing the killing of civilians". Russia asked for Kolomoyskyi to be put on Interpol's wanted list. On 2 July 2014, a Russian District Court called for his arrest.

As governor, Kolomoyskyi went to some lengths to maintain a reputation for ruthlessness: visitors to his office were unsettled by an enormous shark tank. Once he became mayor of Dnipro in November 2015, and after his boss's ouster as governor, Filatov found Kolomoyksyi's "oligarch mentality" unchanged: "he started calling to ask me favours".

==== Conflict with President Poroshenko ====
On 25 March 2015, Ukrainian president Petro Poroshenko signed a decree dismissing Kolomoyskyi from the post of Dnipropetrovsk RSA Head, saying "Dnipropetrovsk region must remain a bastion of Ukraine in the East and protect peace". Kolomoyskyi was replaced by Valentyn Reznichenko. This followed a struggle with Poroshenko for control of the state-owned oil pipeline operator. After Poroshenko's dismissal of Oleksandr Lazorko, who was a protégé of Kolomoyskyi, as a chief executive of UkrTransNafta, Kolomoyskyi dispatched his private security guards to seize control of the company's headquarters and expel the new government-appointed management. While Lazorko was in charge the state-owned pipelines had been delivering oil to a Kolomoyskyi-owned refinery in preference to competitors.

In a further move against Kolomoyskyi, Poroshenko replaced Kolomoysky's long-time business partner Ihor Palytsia as governor of neighboring Odesa Oblast with the former Georgian president, Mikheil Saakashvili. That appointment triggered a dramatic and public war of words between Kolomoyskyi and Saakashvili. Saakashvili told journalists Kolomoyskyi was a "gangster" and "smuggler." Kolomoyskyi told them Saakashvili was "a dog without a muzzle" and "a snotty-nosed addict."

Kolomoyskyi responded that the only difference between Poroshenko and Yanukovych is "a good education, good English and lack of a criminal record." Everything else is the same: "It's the same blood, the same flesh reincarnated. If Yanukovych was a lumpen dictator, Poroshenko is the educated usurper, slave to his absolute power, craven to absolute power."

==== Dnipro Guard ====
The Russian invasion of Ukraine that has begun on 24 February 2022 again has highlighted the presence in Dnipro of the volunteer "Dnipro Guard" (Варта Дніпра, Varta Dnipra), first formed in 2014 with Kolomoyskyi support in response to the war in Donbas. Mayor of Dnipro Borys Filatov dismissed suggestions that the group was Kolomoyskyi's "private army". Kolomoyskyi, according to Filatov, helped with some equipment purchases, but the volunteer guard performs (as of March 2022) defence and law and order functions under the leadership of the national police.

=== Relationship with Volodymyr Zelenskyy ===
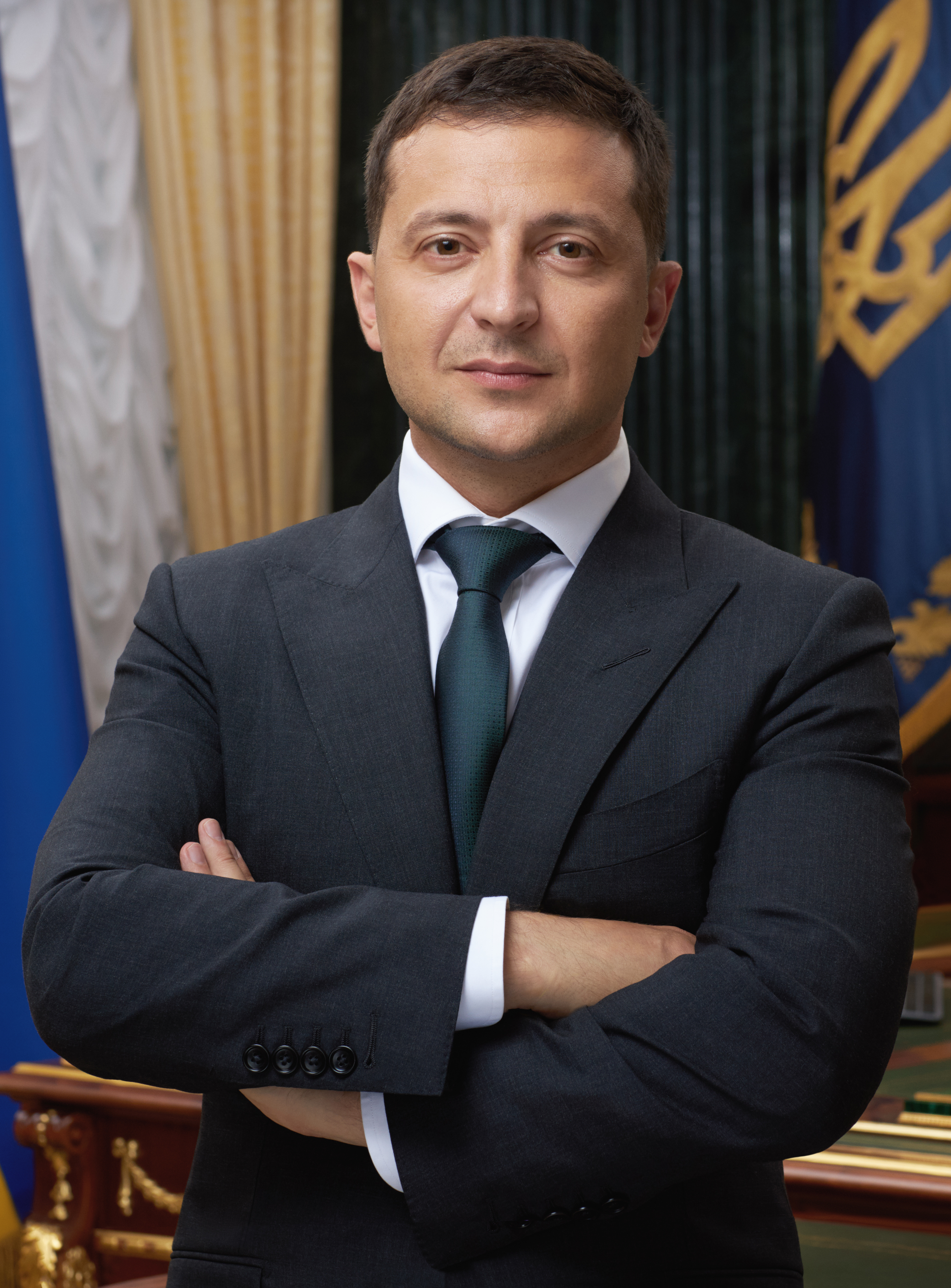
Official portrait of Volodymyr Zelenskyy, 2019

As of 2019, Kolomoyskyi owned 70% of the 1+1 Media Group whose TV channel 1+1 aired Servant of the People, a comedy series in which Volodymyr Zelenskyy plays a school teacher who, defying all expectations (including his own), becomes president of Ukraine on an anti-corruption platform. In March 2018, members of Zelenskyy's production company Kvartal 95 registered a new political party called "Servant of the People." Twelve months later, Zelenskyy won the first round of the presidential election, and then defeated President Poroshenko in the second round with 73 per cent of the vote.

Zelenskyy was viewed by opponents, and not least by the incumbent Poroshenko, as Kolomoyskyi's candidate. Zelenskyy appointed Kolomoyskyi's personal lawyer as a key campaign advisor; travelled to Geneva and Tel Aviv to confer with the then-exiled Kolomoyskyi on multiple occasions; and benefited from the endorsement of Kolomoyskyi's media empire. Once in office, Zelenskyy appeared to remove officials deemed a threat to Kolomoyskyi's interests, among them the prosecutor general, Ruslan Ryaboshapka, the governor of the National Bank of Ukraine (NBU), Yakiv Smolii, and Zelenskyy's first prime minister, Oleksiy Honcharuk, who tried to loosen Kolomoyskyi's control of a state-owned electricity company.

Following the opening of U.S. criminal investigations of Kolomoyskyi and his associates, the oligarch appeared to lose influence with Zelenskyy. In 2020, Zelenskyy sponsored a law that banned former owners from recovering nationalized assets. On 1 February 2021, Oleksandr Dubinsky, a former 1+1 journalist who had actively opposed this so-called "anti-Kolomoyskyi law", was expelled from Zelenskyy's Servant of the People parliamentary faction. Claiming he was part of a "Russia-linked foreign influence network" associated with fellow People's Deputy Andrii Derkach, the U.S. Department of the Treasury's Office of Foreign Assets Control had placed Dubinsky on its sanction list.

As had Rabinovich, as co-founder of the Opposition Platform, Kolomoyskyi had begun to call for a new partnership between Ukraine and Russia. When that happened, he proposed that NATO would be "soiling its pants and buying Pampers." Meanwhile, striking "a more assertive tone", Zelenskyy was pushing for membership of the European Union and the NATO alliance". In response to the announcement of US sanctions against Kolomoyskyi in April 2021, the Office of the Ukrainian President released a statement declaring "Ukraine must overcome a system dominated by oligarchs" and acknowledging that "Ukraine is grateful to each partner for its support along the way".

In October 2021, the Pandora Papers revealed that Zelenskyy and two of his Kvartal 95 associates operated a network of offshore companies in the British Virgin Islands, Cyprus, and Belize dating back to 2012. Zelenskyy's office sought to justify the network as having been a means of protecting him against the aggressive abuse of tax inspection powers by President Viktor Yanukovych. Potentially more damaging than the appearance of tax evasion was the charge by a political ally of Poroshenko, the journalist Volodymyr Ariev, that the network had laundered some $41 million in funds from Kolomoyskyi's Privatbank.

While investigative journalists suspected that channels of communication with the president remained open, Kolomoyskyi insisted that he no longer communicated with Zelenskyy. He explained that his former protégé "has chosen his path". As president Zelenskyy "has his own vision, program, plans" and as he, a businessman, no longer wants anything from the state, they have nothing to talk about. Kolomoyskyi had the reputation for being able to dictate the votes of deputies within Zelenskyy's parliamentary faction by phone but press reports before the Russian invasion suggested he had "disappeared", staying deliberately away from politics. Despite this, in January 2022, Zelenskyy's Justice Minister Denis Malyuska proposed that Kolomoyskyi's was an "obvious" name to be entered on the register of the new anti-oligarchic law that was to come into effect in May 2022.

In the wake of the Russian invasion, Zelenskyy was seen to be under increased pressure to counter Ukraine's reputation as a kleptocracy and respond to the ongoing investigation of Kolomoyskyi in the United States. In both Washington and European capitals, proponents of large-scale assistance to Ukraine contended with Transparency International's European ranking of Ukraine as second only to Russia in institutional corruption. Due to accountancy concerns, approved funds were not being released.

== Revocation of Ukrainian citizenship and subsequent sanctions ==
On 28 July 2022, Zelenskyy appeared to confirm the authenticity of an 18 July presidential decree published online by opposition MP Serhiy Vlasenko that strips Ukrainian citizenship from Kolomoyskyi and nine others, including Vadim Rabinovich and both Hennadiy Korban, former deputy governor of Dnipropetrovsk under Kolomoyskyi (and since 24 February 2022, head of the Dnipro Territorial Defence). Although dual citizenship is prohibited under Ukrainian law, all three held Israeli passports. Kolomoyskyi, who additionally holds a Cypriot passport, reportedly quipped that while Ukrainian law prohibits dual citizenship, it says nothing about triple citizenship.

Kolomoyskyi potentially had safe haven in Ukraine. Article 25 of the country's constitution states that "a citizen of Ukraine cannot be expelled from Ukraine or extradited to another state." But there may be grounds for appeal, as it also rules that "a citizen of Ukraine cannot be deprived of citizenship".

"There is no speculation", Zelenskyy said. "We grant or revoke citizenship of our state on a regular basis. This is a constant process. And all this happens all the time within the framework of the current legislation." Justice Minister Denys Maliuska refuted the suggestion that by this measure Zelenskyy shielded Kolomoyskyi from the proscriptions of the anti-oligarch law, and noted that for the purposes of the law foreigners could also be designated as oligarchs.

In July 2022, a member of Zelenskyy's team reportedly claimed that Kolomoyskyi was "holed up" in the Menorah Centre that he helped finance in Dnipro, hiding from Russian shelling, and that he had retired not only from business, but also from "socio-political life".

At the end of June 2022, the barrister representing Kolomoyskyi in the London High Court, Mark Howard KC, said his client was a "target" of the Russian president. "We know that President Putin has him within his sights," he told the court. The barrister for his co-defendant in the Privatbank fraud case made the same claim for Hennadiy Boholyubov, whom he also described as hiding from bombs in Ukraine. Clare Montgomery QC suggested to the court that the war has "rendered oligarchy a worthless concept in the Ukraine". Acknowledging the difficulties faced by the two billionaires in preparing their cases, Justice Trower, agreed to delay the trial until June 2023.

Under martial law, in November 2022 the Ukrainian authorities seized two oil companies, Ukrnafta and Ukrtatnafta, in which Kolomoyskyi is a major shareholder, after Ukraine's security service (SBU) said it had uncovered the embezzlement of more than $1bn. At the end of January 2023, they raided Kolomoyskyi's home in what a Zelenskyy ally described as a sweeping wartime clampdown on corruption that would change the country.

=== September 2023 arrest and charges ===
Kolomoyskyi was arrested by the Security Service of Ukraine (SBU) on 2 September 2023 on charges of money laundering and fraud, and placed under pre-trial arrest until 31 October with the option of posting 509 million hryvnia (US$14 million) in bail. Ukraine's Prosecutor General's Office accused Kolomoyskyi of laundering $13.5 million between 2013 and 2020 by transferring funds abroad. Kolomoyskyi's lawyers said he would not pay bail and would appeal the ruling.

President Zelenskyy thanked Ukrainian law enforcement in his 2 September nightly address, saying there would be "no more decades-long 'business as usual' for those who plundered Ukraine and put themselves above the law and any rules".

On 7 September, the National Anti-Corruption Bureau of Ukraine (NABU) placed additional charges against Kolomoyskyi for allegedly embezzling 9.2 billion hryvnia (US$250 million) from PrivatBank using an offshore company between January and March 2015, and seized his assets together with the Specialized Anti-Corruption Prosecutor's Office (SAPO).

On 15 September, the SBU announced that Kolomoyskyi had been served with a third notice of suspicion for the alleged embezzlement of UAH 5.8 billion (approximately US$155.6 million), also from PrivatBank. Serhiy Leshchenko, an advisor in Zelenskyy's office, reported on Telegram that the new allegations included "forging documents, illegal takeovers of property by an organised group, and property acquisition in questionable circumstances" (as summarised by Reuters), and were based on an investigation by the Ukrainian Bureau of Economic Security. Following the third set of charges, the court increased Kolomoyskyi's bail to 3.8 billion hryvnia (US$105 million).

On 8 May 2024, while still in detention pending trial for the previous charges, Kolomoyskyi was served with another notice of suspicion for allegedly ordering the contract killing of a law firm director in 2003.

On 13 February 2025, President Volodymyr Zelenskyy imposed sanctions on multiple oligarchs and individuals including Kolomoyskyi on suspicion of "high treason" and assisting a terrorist organization, particularly their role in compromising national security through unfavorable business agreements with Russia. The next day, the Ukrainian Prosecutor General's Office announced the opening of criminal investigations against him and other sanctioned individuals.

On 6 August 2026, NABU and SAPO submitted an indictment to the court against Kolomoyskyi and five other individuals regarding the alleged misappropriation of more than UAH 9.2 billion from PrivatBank.

== Personal life ==
Kolomoyskyi is currently a citizen of Israel. He also obtained Cypriot citizenship through a golden visa, which was revoked in 2024 after a review found that he had withheld information about his criminal charges in his application. He is married to fellow Dnipro native Iryna Mikhailivna Kolomoyska. They have a daughter, Angelika Kolomoyska, and a son, Israel Zvi Kolomoyskyi.

== Awards ==
- 2006 – Knight of the Order "For Merits" III degree (19 August)
- 2015 – "For sacrifice and love for Ukraine", from the UOC-KP and Patriarch Filaret

== See also ==
- Ukrainian oligarchs
