= Vadim Rabinovich =

Israeli and former Ukrainian oligarch and Jewish community leader

- Вадим Рабінович ודים רבינוביץ׳
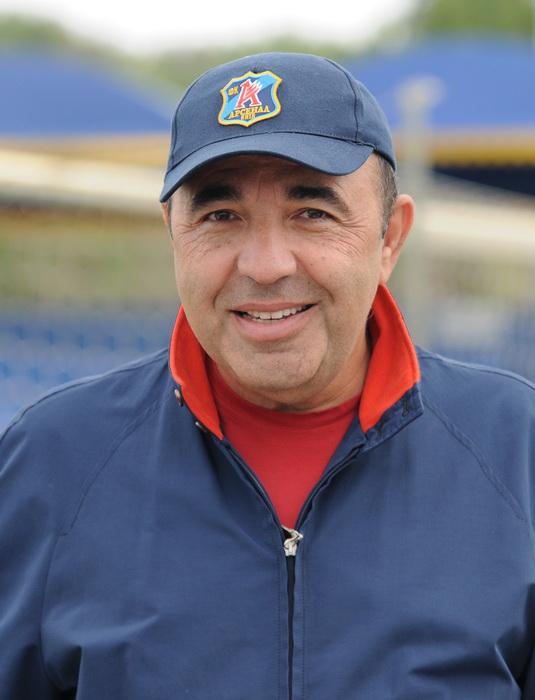
- Rabinovich in 2009

People's Deputy of Ukraine
- In office 27 November 2014 – 3 November 2022 (Note: Parliament terminated the powers of the People's Deputy Rabinovich because of his deprivement of Ukrainian citizenship.)
- Constituency: Opposition Bloc, No. 4 (2014–2019); Opposition Platform — For Life, No. 2 (2019–2022)

Personal details
- Born: 4 August 1953 (age 73) Kharkiv, Ukrainian SSR, Soviet Union (now Ukraine)
- Citizenship: Ukraine (formerly, revoked); Israel
- Party: Opposition Platform — For Life (2016–2022)
- Other political affiliations: Opposition Bloc (2014–2016)
- Children: 1 daughter, 2 sons
- Occupation: Natural gas exporter; Media proprietor
- Known for: European Jewish Parliament; Philanthropy; FC Arsenal Kyiv

Military service
- Allegiance: Soviet Union
- Branch/service: Soviet Army
- Years of service: 1973–1975

Vadim Zinovyevich Rabinovich (Note: Also transliterated as Vadym Zinoviyovych Rabinovych) (Note: Ukrainian: Вадим Зіновійович Рабінович Russian: Вади́м Зино́вьевич Рабино́вич Hebrew: ודים רבינוביץ׳) (born 4 August 1953) is an Israeli and formerly Ukrainian oligarch and Jewish community leader. He is a former leader of the banned Opposition Platform — For Life party, as well as an unsuccessful candidate in the 2014 Ukrainian presidential election and a People's Deputy of Ukraine from the 8th and 9th Verkhovna Rada convocations, serving as a member of the Opposition Bloc from 2014 to 2019 and as a member of Opposition Platform — For Life from 2019 until he was removed from office by the party for his support of Russia during the 2022 Russian invasion of Ukraine.

Born in Kharkiv, Rabinovich spent seven years in Soviet prisons for embezzlement and involvement with the black market, and made aliyah to Israel in the early 1990s, becoming an Israeli citizen in 1999. Rabinovich was a supporter of efforts to restore the Hurva Synagogue, for which a square was named after him after he was mistakenly believed to be deceased. In addition to his leadership of the Jewish community in Ukraine and philanthropic activities in Israel, Rabinovich is known for his support of pro-Russian politics in Ukraine, including his founding of the Opposition Platform — For Life political party and participation in the 2014 Ukrainian presidential and parliamentary elections.

In 2022, Rabinovich left Ukraine shortly after the beginning of the Russian invasion, beforehand blaming the possibility of the war on the west and Ukraine on his Facebook. In March 2022, his position as a People's Deputy of Ukraine was terminated by Opposition Platform — For Life. The next month, Ukraine's government placed Rabinovich on a list of 111 people labelled as traitors in the war with Russia, and in July 2022, his citizenship was revoked by President Volodymyr Zelenskyy, along with Ihor Kolomoyskyi and eight other Ukrainian oligarchs. On 3 November 2022 the parliament officially terminated the powers of the People's Deputy Rabinovich because of his deprivement of Ukrainian citizenship.

== Early life and career ==
In 1970, Rabinovich graduated from Kharkiv Secondary School 45 and entered the Kharkiv National Automobile and Highway University. From 1973 to 1975, he performed mandatory military service in the Soviet Army's Air Defense Army. After leaving the army, Rabinovich was a foreman in the repair and construction department of the Kharkiv City Council.

On 20 January 1980, he was arrested for "embezzlement of state funds in especially large amounts", but was released after a nine-month investigation. Between 1980 and 1982, he headed wooden door production workshops.

Early in 1982, he was again arrested for "embezzlement of state fund in especially large amounts". On 10 February 1984, he was sentenced to 14 years in forced labor camp by the Kharkiv Oblast court. His assets were confiscated, and professional activity was prohibited for 5 years. Rabinovich spent a total seven years in Soviet prisons, and has referred to the charges against him by Soviet prosecutors as "trumped up".

In early 1986, following an early release, he began operating a business. Rabinovich, along with Andrii Alioshyn, established the Pinta firm, engaged in trading metals.

== Activities in Israel ==
In the early 1990s, Rabinovich made aliyah to Israel, and acquired citizenship in 1999. A naturalized Israeli citizen, Rabinovich maintains homes in Ukraine and Israel.

Rabinovich has donated over NIS 10 million to the restoration of the Hurva Synagogue. As a result of his extensive funding of the Hurva Synagogue's restoration, the square where the synagogue resides was named after him. In 2012, councilwoman Rachel Azaria petitioned the Supreme Court of Israel to rescind the naming of the square, saying that Rabinovich was mistakenly thought to be deceased. The Supreme Court agreed, revoking the naming of the square; Israeli law forbids the naming of streets and public venues in Jerusalem after living people. Rabinovich has supported Jewish charitable organisations, and is a benefactor of the golden menorah in Jerusalem's Temple Institute.

Some Jewish leaders have accused Rabinovich of trying to buy positive publicity to make up for the negative publicity generated by his financial and political activities.

== Activities in Ukraine ==
In fall 1993, Rabinovich was appointed as the Ukrainian representative of the Austrian-based company Nordex. The reputation of Nordex president and Russian mafia leader Grigory Luchansky affected the image of Rabinovich. Rabinovich had his visa to the United States revoked in 1995, reportedly due to links to arms dealers.

In 1997, Rabinovich founded the 1+1 TV channel with Alexander Rodnyansky and Boris Fuksman. In 1996, he was appointed chairman of the Israeli-Ukrainian Chamber of Commerce. From 1997 to 2009, Rabinovich was president of the Stolichnye Novosti publishing company. Rabinovich also created the All-Ukrainian Jewish Congress, then dissolved the organization in April 1999 and created the United Jewish Community of Ukraine, which elected him as its leader. In 2008, Rabinovich acquired the NewsOne TV channel.

On 24 June 1999, the Security Service of Ukraine (SBU) banned Rabinovich from entering Ukraine for a period of 5 years, according to the SBU press service, because Rabinovich's activity caused considerable damage to the economy of Ukraine. Later media reports said the SBU decision was related to Rabinovich leaking information about the sale of ammunition by Ukraine to Yugoslavia despite the international embargo then in effect.

With help from Rabinovich, a monument to victims of terrorism was dedicated in Kyiv by Ukrainian President Viktor Yushchenko, U.S. ambassador John E. Herbst and Russian ambassador Viktor Chernomyrdin on 11 September 2005. Since 1997, he has been president of the All-Ukrainian Jewish Congress. In 2001, Rabinovich became head of the Step Towards Unity Forum of Christians and Jews. In 2011, with fellow Ukrainian oligarch Ihor Kolomoyskyi, he founded the European Jewish Union (now known as the European Jewish Parliament), and served as co-chair of the organisation. He was president of the Arsenal Kyiv football club from 2007 until the club's collapse in 2013.

In March 2013, Rabinovich survived an apparent attempt on his life in Kyiv after an explosive device was hurled into his car near the Klovska metro station.

=== 2014 Ukrainian presidential and parliamentary election ===
On 25 March 2014, Rabinovich registered with the Central Election Commission as a self-nominated candidate for the presidency of Ukraine. This was partly to counter the characterization of the new Ukrainian government as antisemitic. After registering, Rabinovich said: "I want to destroy the myth about an anti-semitic Ukraine which is spreading around the world. Probably I'm the most fortunate candidate. Today unification is needed, and I'm a unifying candidate. I have no maniacal thirst for power, I just want to help the country". In the election, he received 2.25% of the vote, with his best showing in the Dnipropetrovsk, Zaporizhzhia, Mykolaiv and Odesa oblasts. Rabinovich was elected to the Verkhovna Rada (Ukraine's parliament) the same year, placing fourth on the pro-Russian Opposition Bloc's electoral list.

In July 2016, Rabinovich suspended his membership of the party, and, together with ex-Opposition Bloc member Yevhen Murayev, created the Opposition Platform — For Life political party. However, Rabinovich did not leave the Opposition Bloc parliamentary faction, so as to maintain his status as a People's Deputy. On 15 November 2018, Rabinovich announced he would not take part in the 2019 Ukrainian presidential election, but that he would top the party list in the following 2019 Ukrainian parliamentary election.

In 2021, Rabinovich launched an unsuccessful attempt to impeach Ukrainian President Volodymyr Zelenskyy over the government's shuttering of three television stations deemed to be pro-Russian.

=== 2022 denunciation and revocation of citizenship ===
On 14 February 2022, Rabinovich published a post on Facebook, stating that "the war has started" and blaming the West and Ukraine for it. Following the start of the Russian invasion of Ukraine, he left Ukraine and fled abroad.

On 17 March 2022 his own party, Opposition Platform — For Life, terminated his term of office as a People's Deputy due to his support for Russia during the Russian invasion. On 6 September 2022 Rabinovich asked the Supreme Court of Ukraine to overturn this decision as an alleged violation of the established parliamentary procedure.

In April 2022, Chesno and the National Agency for Prevention of Corruption (NAPC) placed Rabinovich on a published list of people accused of treason, calling him a "collaborator, pro-Russian politician".

In July 2022, reports emerged that President Volodymyr Zelenskyy had signed a decree to revoke Rabinovich's Ukrainian citizenship. On 3 November 2022 the Ukrainian parliament officially ended Rabinovich's position as a People's Deputy, because of his loss of Ukrainian citizenship.

In July 2023, the State Bureau of Investigation announced that Rabinovich was wanted on suspicion on treason, claiming that he had "made manipulative statements that harmed the sovereignty, territorial integrity and inviolability, state, economic and information security of Ukraine. His propaganda activities helped the leadership of the Russian Federation to achieve its military and political goals".

== Political positions ==
Rabinovich stands for a non-aligned status of Ukraine, administrative reform and deep decentralization with maximum powers to the regional administrations. However, according to OPORA monitoring, he never voted for bills in support of decentralisation in Ukraine. Rabinovich stated that these bills do not correspond to the concept of decentralization, so he did not vote for them. Rabinovich instead proposed to hold a referendum on the issue of abolishing the office of President of Ukraine, a new Constitution, including federalization, which he does not want to be named federalization "because that word makes people nervous."

== Personal life ==
Vadim Rabinovich is married to Irina Rabinovich and has three children: son Oleh (born 1973), daughter Katerina (born 1994), and son Jacob (born 2008).

== Media holdings ==
Rabinovich founded Media International Group (MIG), which included the Stolichnye Novosti publishing company, the MIGnovosti and MIGnews newspapers in Ukraine and Israel, respectively, and the Delovaya Nedelya business weekly, in 2000. MIG later purchased Novoe Russkoe Slovo (New Russian Word, the oldest Russian newspaper in the US), the Narodnaia Volna radio station, the CN-Stolichnye Novosti political weekly and the Stolichka daily newspaper. Rabinovich co-owned Jewish News One from 2011 until its closure in 2014.
