= Golden Rose Synagogue (Dnipro) =

Synagogue in Dnipro, Ukraine

- Ukrainian: Дніпровська Хоральна Синагога «Золота Роза»
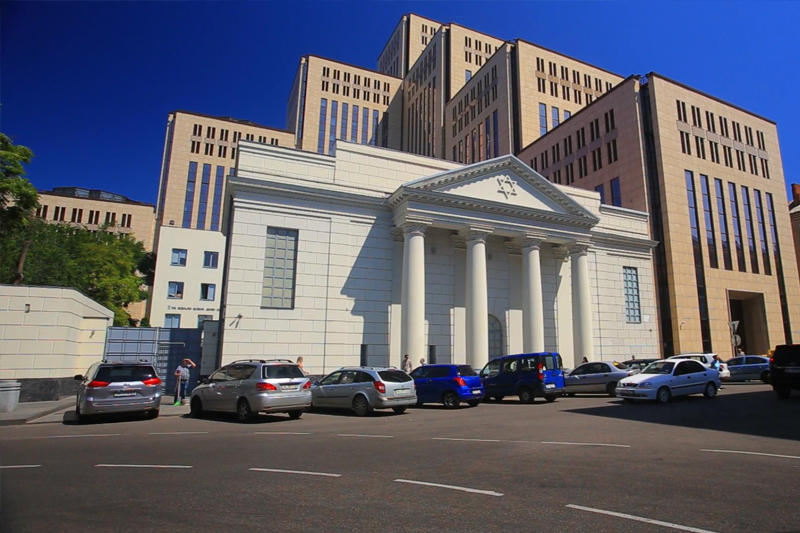
- The synagogue in 2023 with adjacent Jewish community center

- Location of the synagogue in Ukraine

Religion
- Affiliation: Orthodox Judaism
- Ecclesiastical or organizational status: Synagogue (1868–1924); Workers' club and warehouse (1924–1996); Synagogue (since 1999)
- Status: Active

Location
- Location: Sholem Aleichem Street, Dnipro
- Country: Ukraine
- Interactive map of Golden Rose Synagogue
- Coordinates: 48°27′50″N 35°03′11″E

Architecture
- Architects: unknown (1868); A. Dolnik and Frank Meisler (1999 restoration)
- Type: Synagogue architecture
- Completed: 1868

The Golden Rose Synagogue (Ukrainian: Дніпровська Хоральна Синагога «Золота Роза») is an Orthodox Jewish synagogue, located on Kotsyubinskiy Street/Sholom Aleichem Street, in Dnipro, Ukraine.

== History ==
The Golden Rose synagogue was built in 1868 (when Dnipro was named Yekaterinoslav). In 1924 the building was used as a workers' club and a warehouse and above the portice a seal of the Union of Soviet Socialist Republics was located in place of the Magen David. In 1996 the building was returned to the Jewish community. In 1999 the reconstruction began, following the design by a local Jewish architect, A. Dolnik. Frank Meisler, an Israeli artist, designed the foyer, the prayer hall and the Holy Ark.

Above the sanctuary entrance is a representation of golden roses, made by Meisler.

A small rotunda between the lobby and sanctuary is decorated with the first line of the Sh’ma Israel prayer. The first words of Sh'ma Israel in Hebrew are at left, but the first words in Russian are at right. The two versions continue around the rotunda until the last words in Russian and Hebrew meet on the opposite side. The doors to the Aaron haKodesh illustrate the Ten Commandments.

A Jewish community center, called the Menorah center, with a library, soup kitchen, classrooms, offices, and a museum called "Tkumah" (rebirth) was opened adjacent to the synagogue in October 2012.

The Director of the Jewish Community of Dnipro is Vyacheslav Brez. The Chief Rabbi of Dnipro is Shmuel Kaminetsky. The congregation is a leading member of the Federation of the Jewish Communities of Ukraine.

== Gallery ==
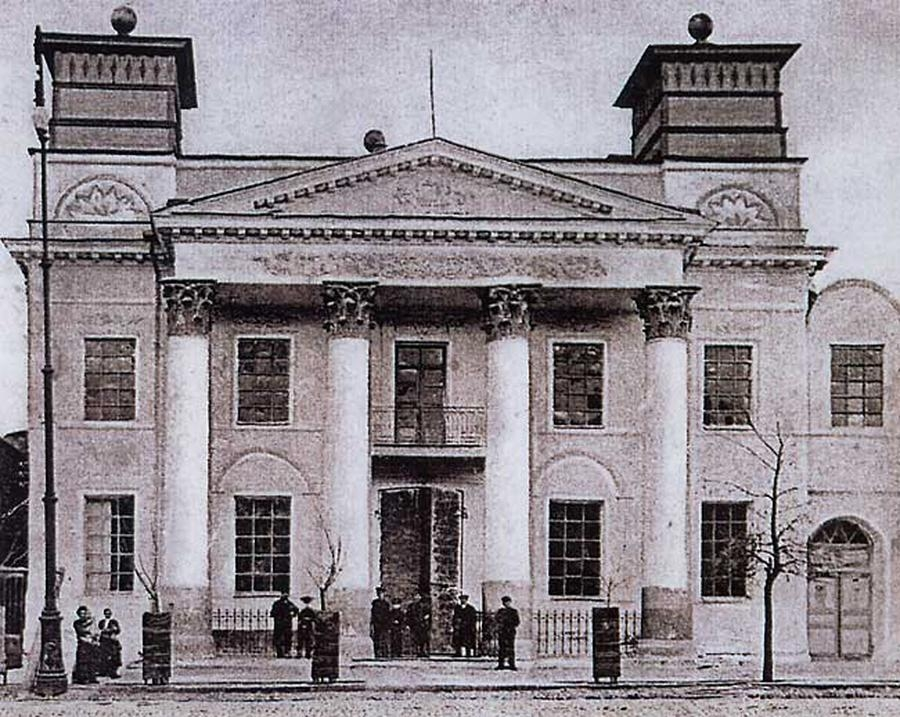
The synagogue in early 20th century

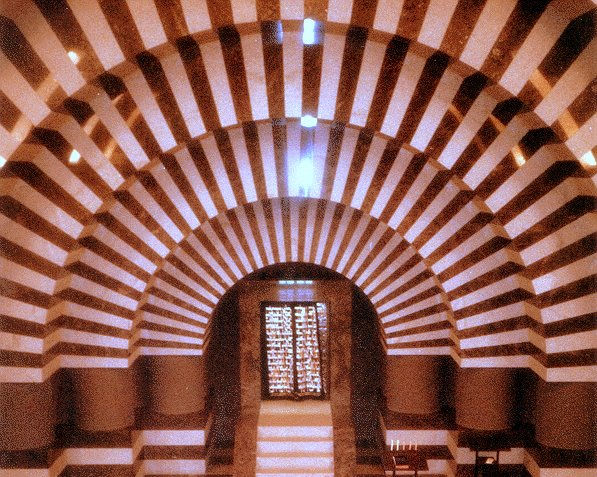
The Holy Ark

== See also ==
- History of the Jews in Ukraine
- List of synagogues in Ukraine
