= Gennadiy Bogolyubov =

Ukrainian businessman

- Геннадій Боголюбов
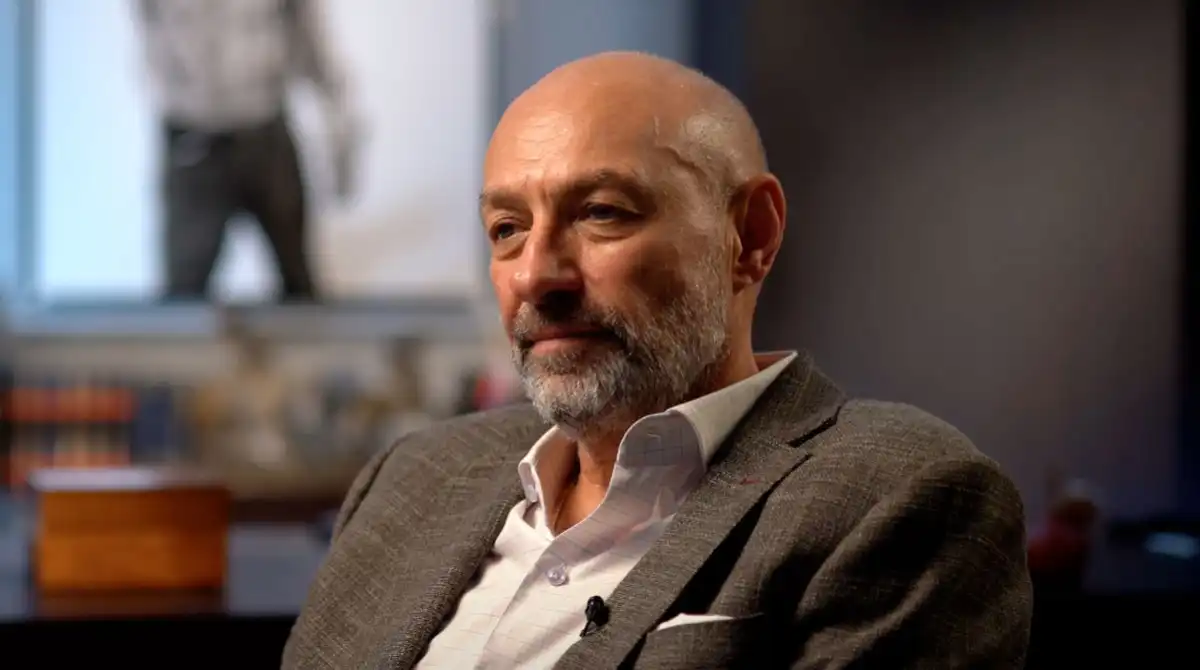
- Born: 20 January 1962 (age 64); Dniprodzerzhynsk, Ukraine SSR, Soviet Union (now Ukraine)
- Citizenship: Ukraine; United Kingdom; Israel; Cyprus
- Known for: Privat Group

Gennadiy (Zvi Hirsch) Bogolyubov (Ukrainian: Геннадій Борисович Боголюбов, romanized: Hennadiy Borysovych Boholiubov; (Note: In this name that follows East Slavic naming customs, the patronymic is Borysovych and the family name is Boholiubov.) Hebrew: גנאדי בוריסוביץ' בוגוליובוב; born 20 January 1962) is a Ukrainian-born oligarch based in the United Kingdom. He controlled Privat Group, along with Ihor Kolomoyskyi and Oleksiy Martynov.

== Early life ==
Gennadiy Bogolyubov is a native of Dniprodzerzhynsk, Dnipropetrovsk Oblast.

== Career ==
In 2010, Bogolyubov was reported as being the third richest Ukrainian, having a net worth of $5.429 billion.

He has interests in ferroalloys, petrochemicals, and finance, and owns the largest manganese miner in Australia, Consolidated Minerals.

In April 2015, it was reported that he had settled out of court with his rabbi, Yonah Pruss, who had sought over £20 million, over "two major London property deals".

Bogolyubov and fellow Ukrainian billionaire Igor Kolomoisky were being sued by another Ukrainian billionaire Viktor Pinchuk in the largest damages claim before London's High Court, for about US$2 billion, settling the case a few days before the trial was due to start.

In 2025, President Volodymyr Zelenskyy imposed sanctions on multiple oligarchs and individuals including Boholyubov on suspicion of "high treason" and assisting a terrorist organization, particularly their role in compromising national security through unfavorable business agreements with Russia. The next day, the Ukrainian Prosecutor General's Office announced the opening of criminal investigations against him and other sanctioned individuals.

== Philanthropy ==
Bogolyubov has established the Bogolyubov Foundation, "a charitable organisation rooted in authentic Torah values". In 2014, his foundation funded an educational center for Jewish history in a hall excavated under Jerusalem's Muslim Quarter, among mainly Mamluk remains connected by underground spaces to the Western Wall tunnel. Bogolyubov financed the excavation and refurbishing of the underground area with ca. $20 million out of his own wealth. Bogolyubov funded the Menorah Centre, a 56,000 square meter Jewish community center with attached synagogue in Dnipropetrovsk, Ukraine.

== Personal life ==
Bogolyubov was married and has six children. He separated from his wife in 2023. He resided on Belgrave Square in Belgravia, London, England, until 2023, paying his ex-wife £7m to move out of the country in an attempt to avoid legal action over alleged fraud at Privatbank by severing his ties to the United Kingdom, threatening to cut off child support to their children if she did not comply. He led a secular life until his mid-40s when he rediscovered Judaism and is a practicing Jew today.

It was reported in The Guardian that Bogolyubov had acquired Cypriot citizenship in 2016 through a "Golden visa" scheme, "as a result of him having made substantial investments in the country (via certain companies) and being fully compliant with the legal requirements at the time".

In November 2017 Bogolyubov officially declared that he was a citizen of Ukraine, United Kingdom, Israel, Cyprus. He also noted that he lived in Geneva, Switzerland.
