= Vadim Shulman =

Ukrainian businessman

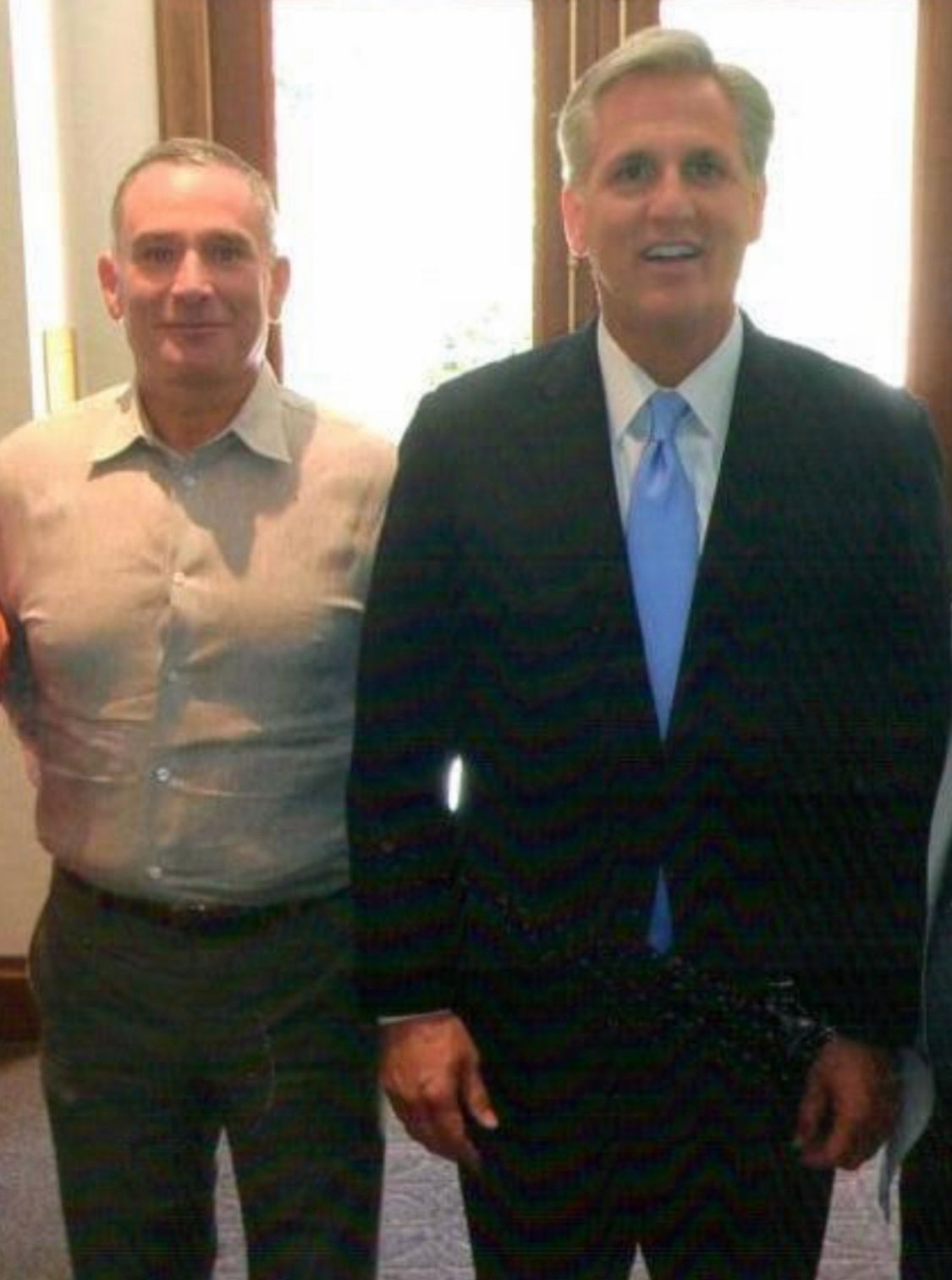
- Born: 1960 (age 65–66); Kryvyi Rih, Ukrainian Soviet Socialist Republic
- Occupations: Businessperson, investor, philanthropist
- Years active: 1980s–present
- Known for: Presidency of the Euro-Asian Jewish Congress and the Ukraine Tennis Federation

Vadim Shulman (born 1960) is a businessman, investor, and philanthropist. He has served as president of the Ukraine Tennis Federation and the Euro-Asian Jewish Congress (EAJC) and is based in Monaco.

== Early life and education ==
Vadim Shulman was born in 1960 in Kryvyi Rih, Ukrainian SSR. He trained as a mining engineer and worked in the local mining industry. In the late 1980s, he transitioned into business, trading and transporting coal from the Donbas region.

== Career ==
In the 1990s and 2000s, Shulman acquired stakes in coal processing and metallurgical enterprises in Ukraine. He was a shareholder in several steel mills and coal enrichment plants, was associated with the Privat Group, and headed the supervisory boards of multiple coking plants. He also co-founded an energy company named Eneko.

In 2006, Shulman entered the Telecommunications sector by acquiring Telesystemy Ukrainy, which launched Ukraine's first 3G mobile network under the brand PeopleNet. By 2007, his investment in the venture was approximately $50 million, with total planned investments of up to $180 million. He later acquired Pathway Genomics, a San Diego-based biotechnology company.

In 2006, Shulman was elected president of the Ukraine Tennis Federation (UTF). In late 2011, he became interim president of the Euro-Asian Jewish Congress (EAJC) and was formally elected to the post in June 2012. During his tenure, he sponsored and co-produced a documentary film series titled The Third World War Has Begun. He resigned from the presidency of the EAJC at the end of 2013.

== Philanthropy ==
Shulman has funded the reconstruction of the Brodsky Choral Synagogue in Kyiv and the construction of a new synagogue in Kryvyi Rih. He also established a boarding school in Jerusalem for children from the former Soviet Union and has served on the Board of Trustees of the Jewish community in the Dnipro region. His foundation, the Bracha Foundation, supports humanitarian projects. His philanthropy also includes support for sports development and medical initiatives.

== Awards and recognition ==
The documentary series The Third World War Has Begun, which Shulman co-produced, received several awards. In 2011, the series received an award presented by New York City Mayor Michael Bloomberg on behalf of the families of 9/11 victims. An installment of the series won a special jury prize at the DetectiveFest international film festival.
