= PrivatBank =

Largest Ukrainian commercial bank, state-owned since December 2016

JSC PrivatBank
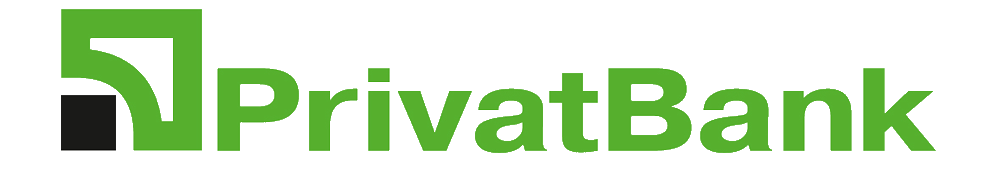

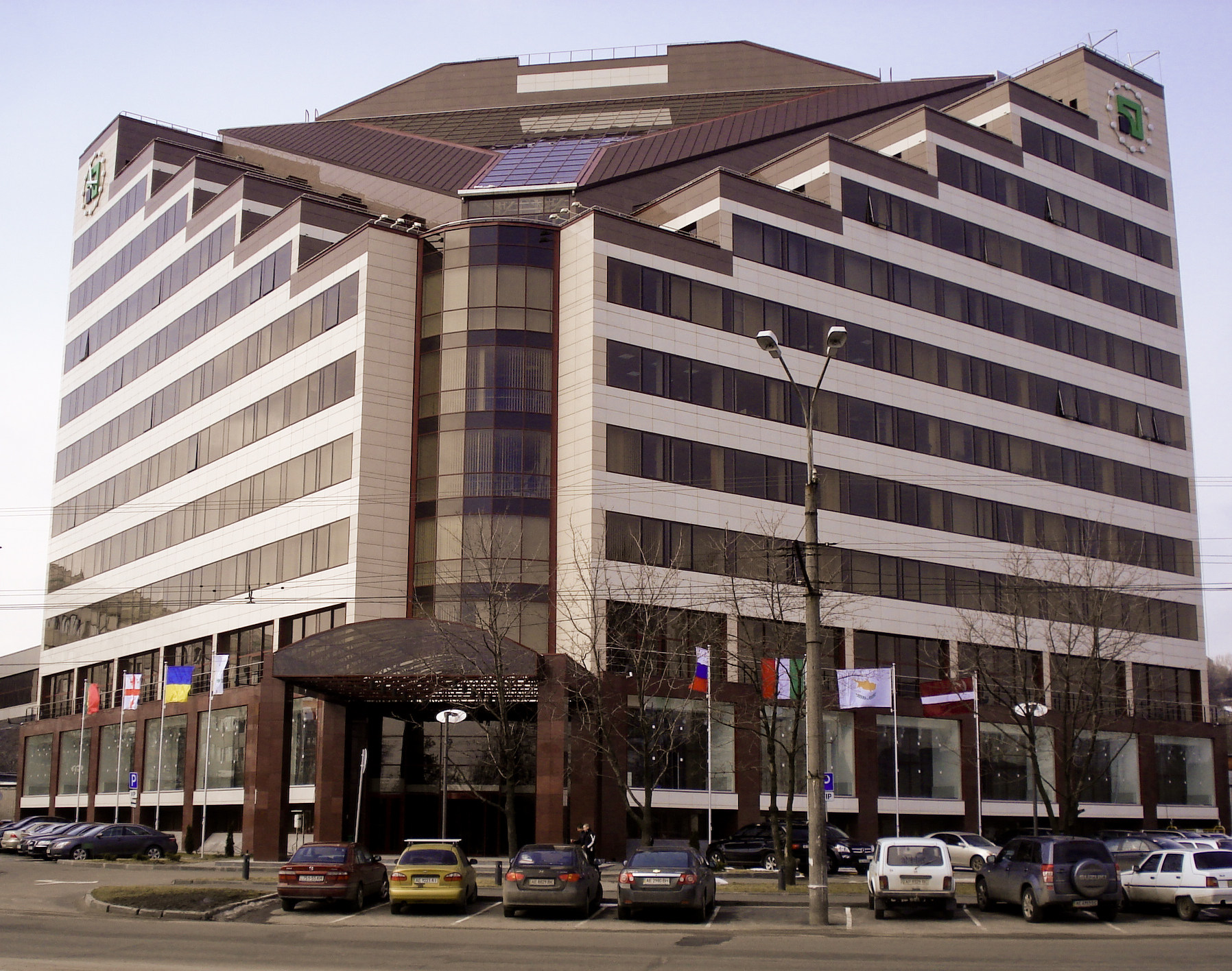
- Banks, head office in Dnipro, 2010
- Native name: Акціонерне товариство Комерційний банк «ПриватБанк»
- Type: Joint-stock company
- Industry: Banking, investment
- Founded: 1992
- Headquarters: Dnipro, Ukraine
- Area served: Ukraine
- Key people: Mikael Björknert
- Services: Financial services
- Net income: 16.9 billion UAH (01.04.2025)
- Owner: Government of Ukraine
- Number of employees: 17.1 thousand (1.01.2025)
- Website: privatbank.ua

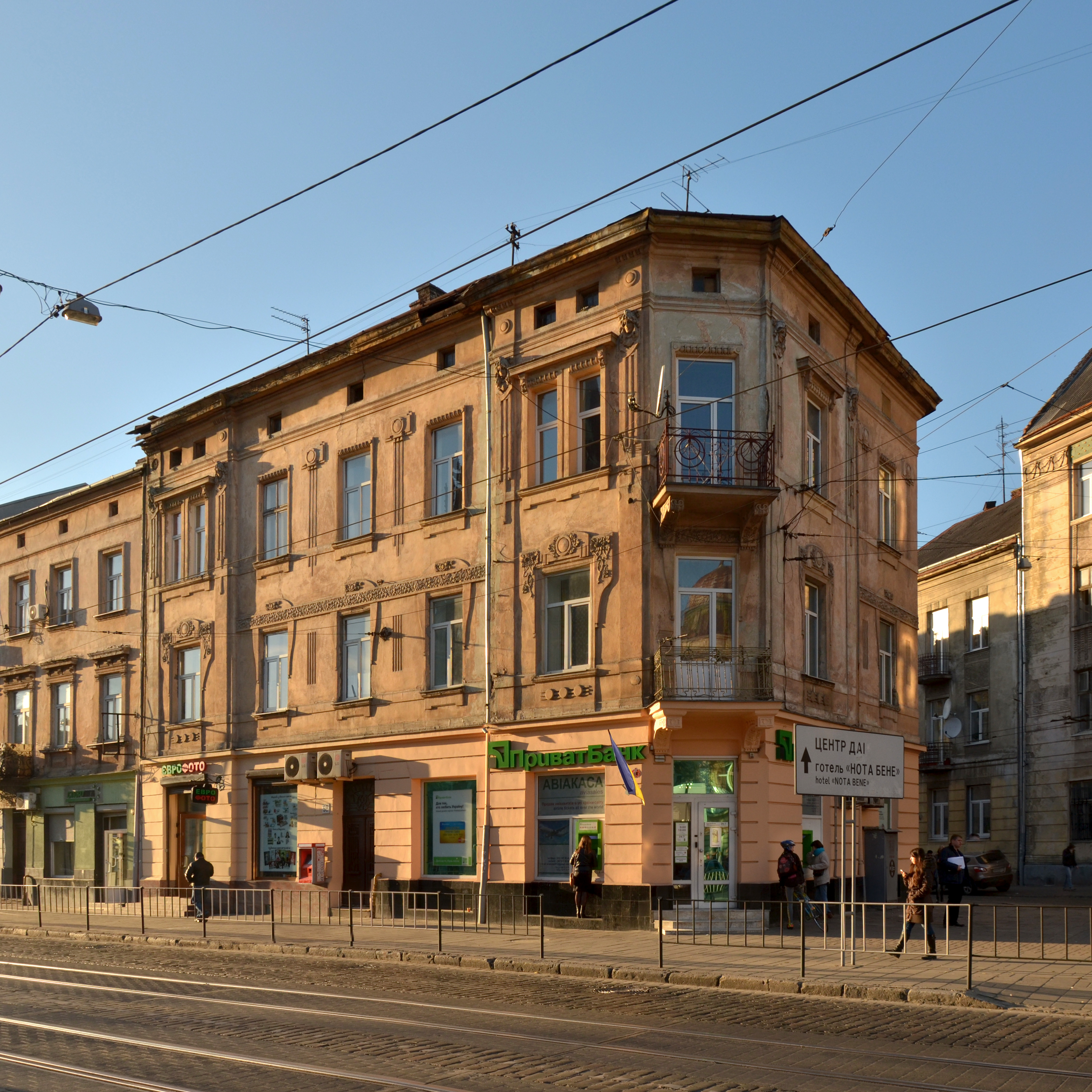
PrivatBank branch in Lviv, 2015

The JSC PrivatBank (Ukrainian: АТ КБ ПриватБанк) is the largest bank in Ukraine by assets. It was formed on 19 March 1992 and has been owned by the Government of Ukraine since 2016, after its nationalisation. In early 2024, it was confirmed by the National Bank of Ukraine as one of the country's systemically important banks.

PrivatBank has the second-largest network of branches and the largest network of ATMs and terminals among Ukrainian banks. As of July 2022, more than 7,000 ATMs, 11,000 payment terminals and more than 250,000 POS terminals are operating in the network. The national banking service network of PrivatBank includes approximately 1,200 branches. PrivatBank is the largest issuer and acquirer of electronic payment means in Ukraine. The bank operates several payment services including Privat24 and LiqPay.

According to the British magazine The Banker, in 2016 PrivatBank ranked 16th among the largest banks in Central and Eastern Europe and 627th among the top 1000 global banks.

As of 2024, the bank has more than 19 million active customers.

== History ==
PrivatBank is a private commercial banks established in Ukraine. Decision on PrivatBank establishment was taken at the meeting of its founders on 7 February 1992.

=== Nationalisation ===
On 18 December 2016 the Deposit Guarantee Fund (DGF) appointed a temporary administrator to manage the activities of PJSC CB "PrivatBank" in accordance with the decision of the National Bank of Ukraine to classify the Bank as insolvent.

On 19–21 December 2016, in accordance with the provisions of the Law of Ukraine “On the Deposit Guarantee System”, the DGF dismissed the Bank's Management and Supervisory Board and was solely responsible for managing the Bank's activities during these three days. The DGF recognized the impairment of loans and advances to customers in the amount of UAH 155,764 million and converted UAH 10,934 million of customer funds, UAH 10,721 million of issued Eurobonds and UAH 7,783 million of subordinated debt into authorized capital of the Bank (‘bail in’). On 21 December 2016, after the bail in, the Bank's shares were sold for UAH 1 to the Ministry of Finance of Ukraine. In December 2016, the Ministry of Finance decided to increase the authorized capital of the Bank by UAH 116,800 million and by further UAH 38,565 million in June 2017. Subsequently, the Ukrainian state has owned 100% of the shares of the authorized capital.

== Main financial indicators ==
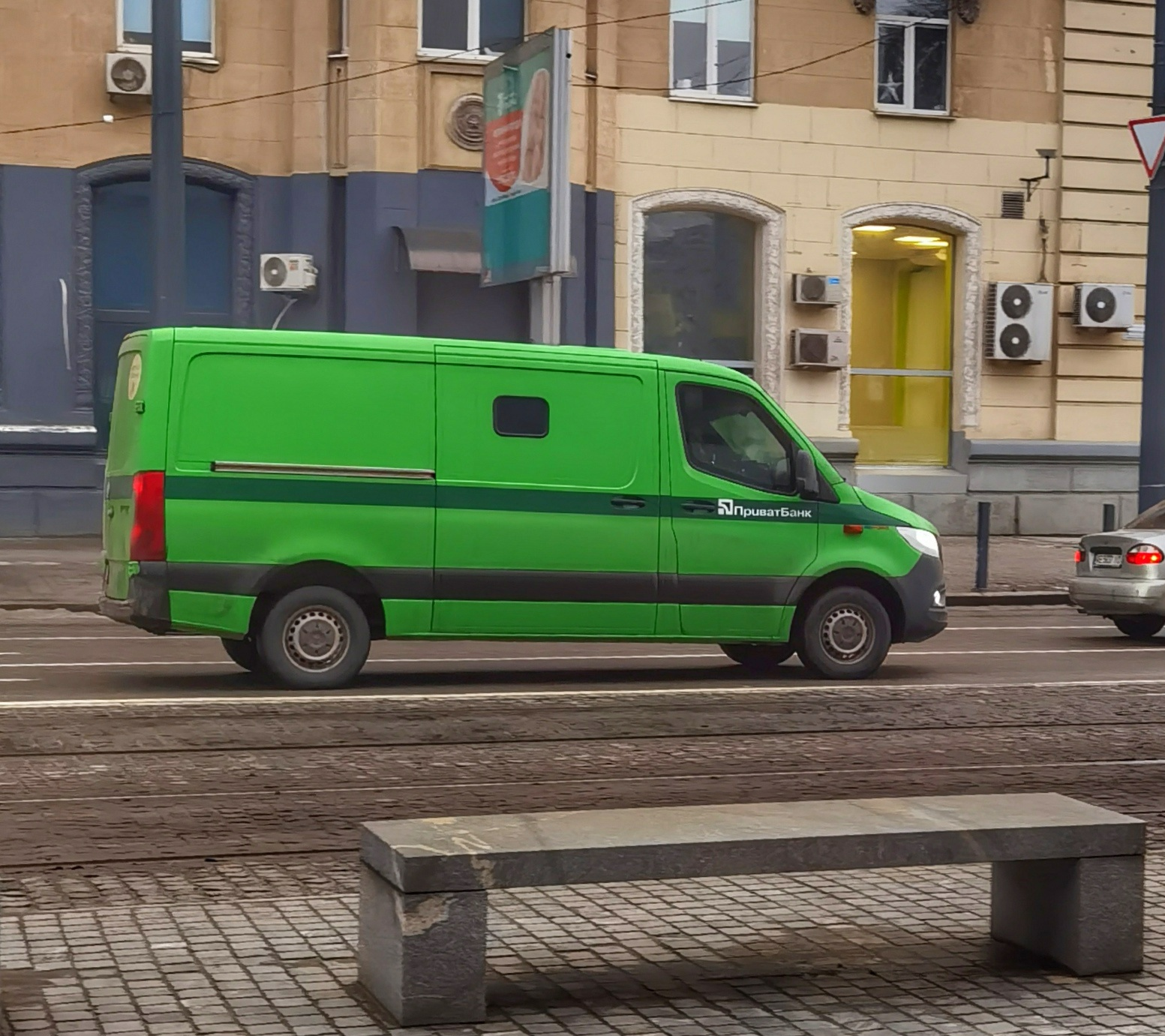
Armored van of Privatbank in Dnipro.

PrivatBank earned a profit of ₴35.050 billion according to the official data of the National Bank of Ukraine in 2021.

Below is information on the Bank's equity, assets, and net profit for the past 15 years. More detailed financial indicators of the Bank can be found on the Bank's website in the section About the Bank – Financial reporting.

| Year | Own capital, UAH billion (at the year-end) | Total assets, UAH billion (at the year-end) | Net profit, UAH million (in a year) |
| 2024 | 99 144 | 761 461 | 40100 |
| 2023 | 84 846 | 680 008 | 37800 |
| 2022 | 57 589 | 540 596 | 30 250 |
| 2021 | 66 615 | 376,577 | 35 050 |
| 2020 | 53 057 | 334,570 | 24 302,000 |
| 2019 | 54 625 | 281,637 | 32 609,000 |
| 2018 | 31 574 | 256,100 | 12 520,000 |
| 2017 | 23 707 | 259,061 | 22 965,913 |
| 2016 | 12,664 | 220,017 | 135 928,838 |
| 2015 | 27,487 | 264,886 | 216,121 |
| 2014 | 22,696 | 204,585 | 749,036 |
| 2013 | 20,311 | 214,490 | 1 873,391 |
| 2012 | 18,300 | 172,428 | 1 532,760 |
| 2011 | 16,746 | 145,118 | 1 425,816 |
| 2010 | 11,879 | 113,437 | 1 370,179 |
| 2009 | 10,270 | 86,066 | 1 050,489 |
| 2008 | 8,195 | 80,165 | 1 291,776 |
| 2007 | 5,388 | 56,211 | 1 534,162 |
| 2006 | 3,288 | 33,777 | 506,208 |
| 2005 | 2,272 | 22,058 | 475,654 |
| 2004 | 1,465 | 14,713 | 164,842 |
| 2003 | 0,955 | 9,842 | 60,549 |
| 2002 | 0,549 | 6,811 | 150,879 |

== See also ==
- List of banks in Ukraine
- Banks in Lviv
