= Shmuel Kaminetsky =

Ukrainian rabbi

Rabbi Shmuel Kaminetsky
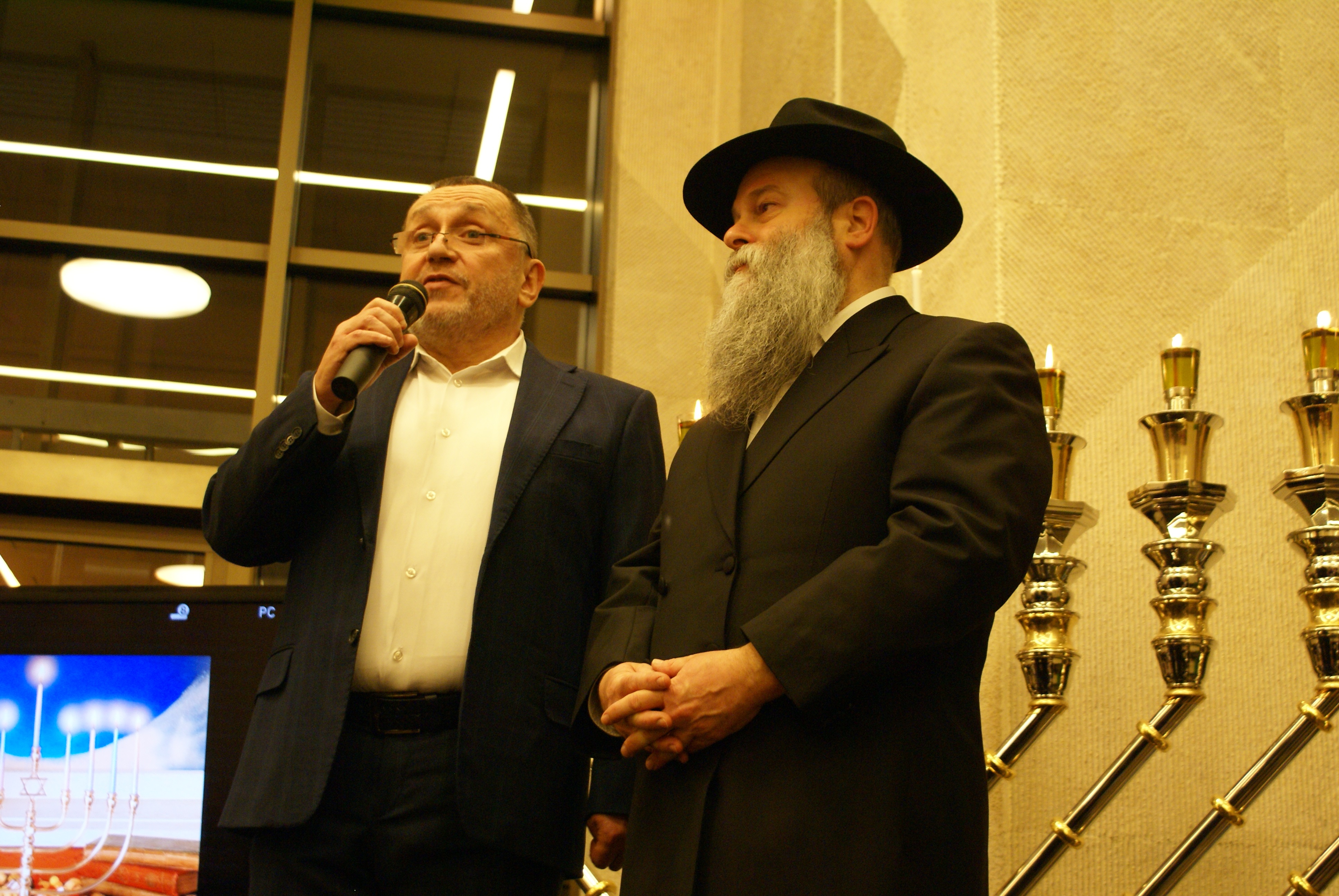

Personal life
- Born: 1965 (age 60–61) Kfar Chabad, Israel

Religious life
- Religion: Judaism
- Position: Chief rabbi of Dnipro and Dnipropetrovsk Oblast
- Organisation: Federation of Jewish Communities of Ukraine and Dnipro Oblast

Shmuel Kaminetsky (born 1965) is an Israel-born rabbi and has been the rabbi of Dnipro and Dnipropetrovsk Oblast since 1990.

== Biography ==
Shmuel Kaminetsky's parents emigrated from the USSR to Israel due to Soviet religious persecution in 1946. Kaminetsky was born in Kfar Chabad, Israel, in 1965.

From 1978 to 1981 he studied at the yeshiva of the city of Lod. In 1981 he went to the United States where he graduated from the Lubavitcher hassidic Rabbinical College of America in New Jersey.

In 1989, he married Hanna Lipsker; they had six daughters and three sons.
