= European Jewish Parliament =

Non-governmental organization

European Jewish Parliament (EJP)
- Founded: 2011
- Founder: Vadim Rabinovich
- Type: Jewish organisation
- Location: Brussels, Belgium
- Region served: European Union
- Key people: Cefi Jozef Kamhi, Vadim Rabinovich, Tomer orni
- Website: www.ejp.eu

The European Jewish Parliament or EJP (formerly known as European Jewish Union or EJU) is a non-governmental organization (NGO) based in Brussels whose stated aim is to be "a uniting structure for all Jewish communities and organizations throughout Western, Eastern and Central Europe as well as establish a permanent relationship with the European Parliament as well as national parliaments."

The EJU-backed EJP is the brainchild of Ukrainian billionaire Vadim Rabinovich.

== European Jewish Union ==
The EJU group was founded in the Spring of 2011 by Ihor Kolomoyskyi and Vadim Rabinovich.

The EJU hoped to establish a European Jewish Parliament, comprising 120 members modeled on the Israeli Knesset. This group would then represent the concerns of the Jewish community to the European Union.

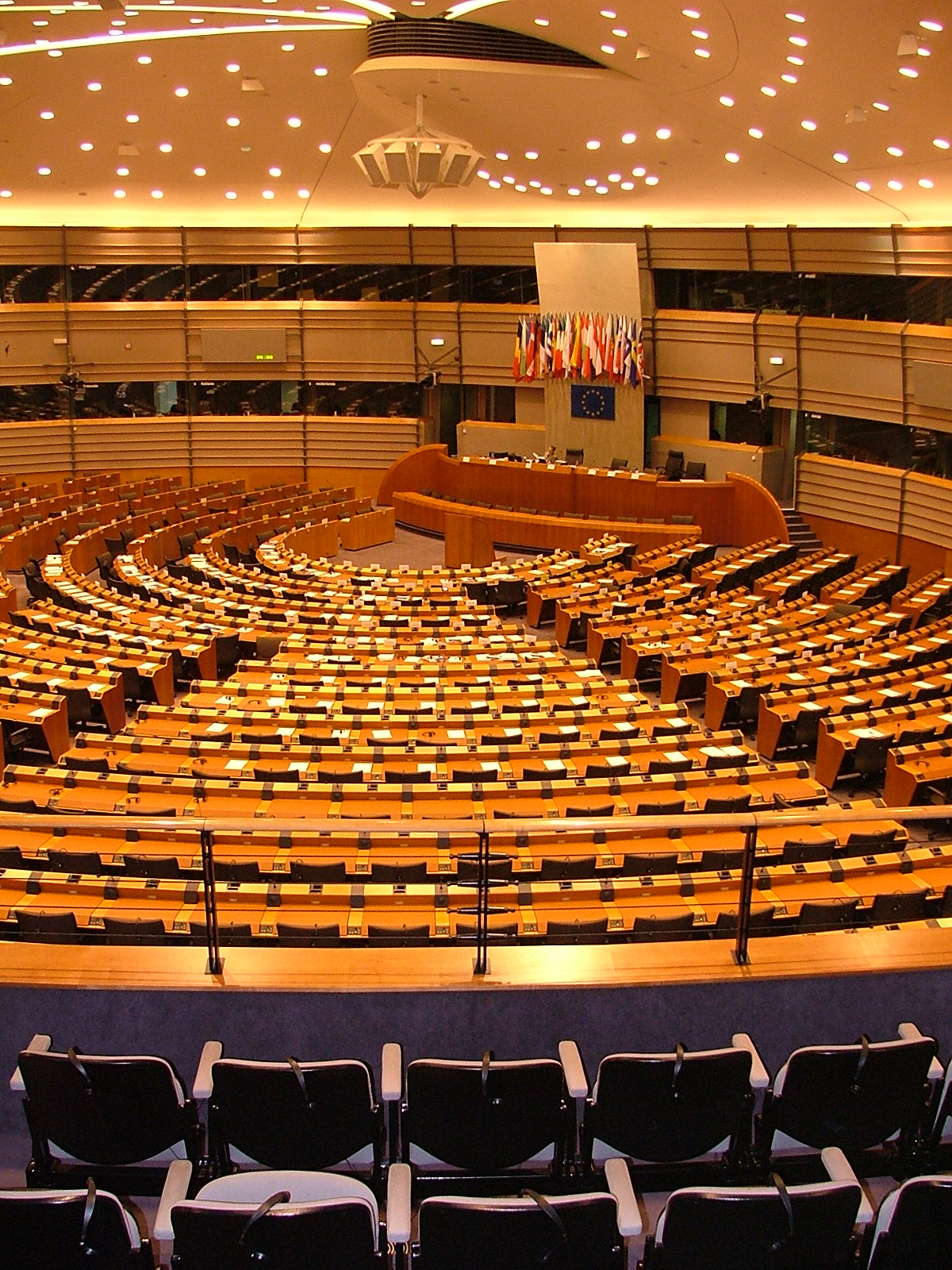
European Parliament building where the EJP assembly meets.

The European Jewish Parliament was inaugurated on February 16, 2012.

The first EJP annual general assembly was held in Brussels on 15-16 May 2012.

== EJP logo ==
Flag of Europe.

The European Jewish Parliament logo is modeled on the flag of Europe's crown of 12 golden stars with 5 rays on a blue background.

Instead, the EJP logo uses a crown of 11 golden stars with a 12th star being a white Star of David, stylized as on the flag of Israel, on a blue background.

== See also ==
- European Parliament
- European Jewish Association
