= Oleksandr Mykolayovych Kovalenko =

Ukrainian economist and politician

Oleksandr Kovalenko
- Олександр Коваленко

1st Minister of Finance
- In office 24 August 1990 – 29 October 1991
- President: Leonid Kravchuk
- Prime Minister: Vitold Fokin
- Preceded by: Office established
- Succeeded by: Hryhoriy Piatachenko

Personal details
- Born: 9 May 1935 Novoliubymivka, Tokmak Raion, Zaporizhzhia Oblast, Ukrainian SSR, Soviet Union
- Died: 29 June 2021 (aged 86) Kyiv, Kyiv Oblast, Ukraine
- Education: Odesa National Economics University
- Profession: Economist politician

Military service
- Allegiance: Soviet Union
- Branch/service: Soviet Army
- Years of service: 1953–1958

Oleksandr Mykolayovych Kovalenko (Ukrainian: Олександр Миколайович Коваленко; 9 May 1935 – 29 June 2021) was a Ukrainian economist and politician who became the first Minister of Finance from 1990 to 1991.

== Biography ==
=== Early life and education ===
Kovalenko was born on 22 March 1932 in the village of Novolyubimivka, Ukraine SSR, and graduated from the Odesa Institute of National Economy in 1964. After completing the military aviation school and serving in the Soviet Army's aviation units from 1953 to 1958.

Prior to Kovalenko's ministerial role, he had held several early positions such as part of the Tokmak Raion Executive Committee of the Zaporizhia Oblast as their inspector and senior inspector of state revenues since 1958; the Vice Chairman of the Primorye Krai Executive Committee and head of the financial division in 1965; the 2nd Secretary of the Primorye Krai Committee of the Communist Party of Ukraine, deputy head of the Zaporizhzhia Regional Finance Department in 1969; an instructor of the Department of Planning and Financial Bodies of the Central Committee of the Communist Party of Ukraine in 1974; the head of the financial department of the Cherkasy Raion Executive Committee in 1976; the 1st Deputy Minister of Finance of the Ukrainian SSR in 1986.

=== Career ===
Kovalenko was appointed as the Minister of Finance of Ukraine on 2 August 1990. He was relieved of his duties as minister on 29 October 1991 because of a decline in his health. The Badge of Honor and two medals were given to him in recognition of his accomplishments throughout many years of financial activity. He would go on to become the 1st Deputy Chairman of the Joint Stock Company (JSC) bank named Ukraine from October 1991 to April 1992. From April 1992 to May 1996, he was promoted to the position of chairman of the bank. lastly, he was the deputy chairman of the board and Head of Affairs of JSC bank Ukraine.

=== Death ===
Kovalenko died at the age of 85 in Kyiv on 29 June 2021. The Ukrainian Cabinet of Ministers extended its deepest sympathies to his family and friends.

== Honours ==
Throughout his career, he has been awarded the following honours;

- Order of the Badge of Honour (1981)
- Merited Economist of Ukraine

Political offices
| Preceded by Office established | 1st Minister of Finance; 24 August 1990 – 29 October 1991 | Succeeded by Hryhoriy Piatachenko |
