= Olena Sibiriakova =

Ukrainian political scientist

- Born: September 21, 1972 (age 53); Kiev, Ukrainian SSR, USSR
- Citizenship: Ukraine
- Occupations: Consultant in public relations, writer
- Employer: Rost Group company (Co-owner)
- Website: Rost Group company, Foundation for Good Politics

Olena Sibiriakova (Ukrainian: Олена Сибірякова, born September 21, 1972) is a Ukrainian expert in public relations (PR), communication program development, business, and political project management. She has a PhD in History and is a co-owner of the Rost Group company.

== Bio ==
Olena Sibiriakova was born in Kyiv, Ukraine, graduating from high school #135 in Kyiv.

Education:

- 1994 – National University of Theatre, Film and TV in Kyiv, Kyiv, Ukraine.
- 2010 – Chartered Institute of Public Relations, London, UK.

Ms. Sibiriakova has a PhD in History (PhD thesis: “Video Communication in the Structure of Modern Culture: the Evolution of Its Impact on the Person”).

== Professional Career and Business ==
In the mid-90s, Sibiriakova worked for Ukrainian TV (1+1 TV channel).

Since 1996, Olena Sibiriakova has been working in consulting and public relations, specialising inbusiness and politics. She has managed more than 20 election campaigns in Ukraine, Russia, Kyrgyzstan for leading national politicians (including Viktor Yushchenko, Valeriy Khoroshkovskyi).

In 1998, she founded the Rost Group company, a company of Ukrainian origin with a range of businesses devoted to development of pharmaceutical operations of the multinational companies in Ukraine. Also, the portfolio of RostBrand includes projects conducted for IT, pharmaceutical, and photo- and video equipment industries. RostGroup has also operated as an outsourcing company.

Since 2010, she has served as Programs Manager for the Foundation for Good Politics.

Sibiriakova is currently a professor at the Kyiv National University of Culture and Arts.

She is also a member of Aspen Ukraine Initiative by Victor Pinchuk Foundation.

== Innovative Platform ==
Since 2008, she has been the project chief of SINCE (affiliated patent by WIPO, 2013), a program solution for the integration of web, TV and new media to create, exchange and drive information to a new level.

Sibiriakova comments: "There's no news in the fact that online streaming has become a routine nowadays. New TV formats and new generation interactive platforms for social activity, uniting people and being born due to new means of internet communication – that's important."

The launch of SINCE marketing and investment exposure was planned for the beginning of 2014. In 2013, the platform was tested by a team of specialists from the Kyiv Polytechnic Institute which included such experts as Timur Shemsedinov and Andrii Hubskyi. The test confirmed the result of SINCE on the ability to hold more than 60,000 connections while using a single server.

== Public Activities and Books ==
In 2007, Sibiriakova published her first book, "Course of Events".

In 2012, Sibiriakova presented to the public her novel "Ukraine. G-Spot". The later book traces the personal narrative of a woman spin doctor concerning 'elections, about how to make a million and about the profession, which doesn't exist". Documentary evidence of modern Ukrainian history is interwoven in the book with a symbolic line of flash G – innovation, alternative Internet, which begin hunting for the strongest world powers, Russia, China, USA and the Arab world.

In 2010, she made an analytical presentation, "Local Elections in Ukraine: in Search of a Democratic Model” at Ukrainian Research Institute, Harvard University.

Since 2014, Sibiriakova has been a member of the International Academy of Television Arts and Sciences

Olena Sibiriakova, as an expert in mass communications, comments for Ukrainian and foreign media.
