= 2010 government formation =

2010 government formation may refer to:

- 2010–2011 Belgian government formation
- 2010–2012 Bosnia and Herzegovina government formation
- 2010 Iraqi government formation
- 2010 Ukrainian government formation
- 2010 United Kingdom government formation
