= Petro Hermanchuk =

Ukrainian economist and politician

- Петро Германчук
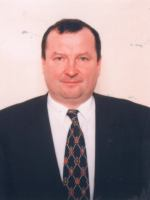

3rd Minister of Finance
- In office 6 July 1994 – 18 June 1996
- President: Leonid Kuchma
- Prime Minister: Vitaliy Masol
- Preceded by: Hryhoriy Piatachenko
- Succeeded by: Valentyn Koronevsky

Personal details
- Born: 14 March 1952 Andriivka, Makariv Raion, Ukrainian SSR, Soviet Union
- Died: 29 June 2012 (aged 60) Kyiv, Kyiv Oblast, Ukraine
- Education: Kyiv National Economic University
- Profession: Economist politician

Military service
- Allegiance: Soviet Union
- Branch/service: Soviet Army

Petro Kuzmovich Hermanchuk (Ukrainian: Петро Кузьмович Германчук; 14 March 1952 – 29 June 2012) was a Ukrainian economist and politician who was formerly the Minister of Finance from 1994 to 1996.

== Biography ==
=== Early life and education ===
Hermanchuk was born on 14 March 1952 in the village of Andriivka, Ukraine SSR, and educated from the Kyiv Institute of National Economy, Faculty of Finance and Economics from 1972 to 1977.

=== Career ===
Prior to Hermanchuk's ministerial role, he had held several early positions such as a fitter at the Tochelektroprylad plant, Kyiv in August 1969; service in the Soviet Army in May 1970; fitter-assembler of the Chervonyy ekskavator plant, Kyiv in June 1972; an economist of the personnel department in January 1979; the senior inspector for the implementation of best practices since September 1979; the senior economist of the state revenue department in January 1982; the senior economist in August 1982; the head of the agricultural financing department of the Kyiv Regional Council of People's Deputies in May 1985; the deputy head of management, head of the budget department, and financial management of the executive committee of the Kyiv Regional Council of People's Deputies in November 1985.

Additionally, Hermanchuk later went on to become the head of the consolidated department of finance and money circulation of the Ministry of Finance of the Ukrainian SSR in February 1990; head of the money circulation and securities department in July 1991; the Deputy Minister of Finance of Ukraine, in February 1992; the 1st Deputy Minister of Finance of Ukraine in July 1993. Finally, he was named Minister of Finance of Ukraine, representative of Ukraine in the European Bank for Reconstruction and Development (EBRD) from 6 July 1994 to 18 June 1996. From November 1997 to July 2001, Petro was appointed as the 1st Deputy Minister of Finance of Ukraine; Advisor to the Prime Minister of Ukraine from June 1996 to January 1997; the Head of the Main Control and Audit Department of Ukraine from 26 July 2001 to 22 February 2005.

=== Other appointments ===
Other appointments or memberships included being a member of the National Security Council under the President of Ukraine; member of the Council on Economic Reforms under the President of Ukraine since December 1994; member of the Labor Council under the President of Ukraine from July 1995 to February 1997; member of the Currency and Credit Council of the Cabinet of Ministers of Ukraine since September 1995; member of the Information Security Commission from February 1998 to July 2000; member of the supervisory boards of Open Joint Stock Company (JSC) Ukrainian Polymetals since October 2000, JSC State Savings Bank of Ukraine since October 2000, JSC Ukrnafta since April 1999.

Hermanchuk was also a member of the supervisory board of the Ukrainian Social Investment Fund in May 2000; member of the Ukrainian part of the Committee on Cooperation between Ukraine and the European Union (EU) since August 2000; member of the Commission on Housing Policy from April 1999 to November 2001; member of the Coordination Committee for Combating Corruption and Organized Crime under the President of Ukraine from September 2001 to February 2005; Chairman of the Exchange Committee of the Ukrainian Interbank Currency Exchange since September 1998; member of the State Commission for Administrative Reform in Ukraine since July 2001; adviser to the Prime Minister of Ukraine on public grounds from November 2006 to December 2007.

=== Death ===
Due to his participant in the liquidation of the consequences of the accident at the Chernobyl Nuclear Power Plant, he died in Kyiv on 29 June 2012. Prime Minister Mykola Azarov quoted, "Hermanchuk Petro Kuzmych, a distinguished specialist and engaged statesman, significantly contributed to securing the growth of Ukraine. His life will serve as an inspiration for many people, and those who knew him will always remember him for his bright memory."

== Honours ==
During his career, he was awarded the following honours;

=== National ===
- Order of Merit First Class (August 2011)
- Order of Merit Second Class (June 2008)
- Merited Economist of Ukraine (August 1999)

=== Foreign ===
- Poland:
  - International Order of Saint Stanislaus

Political offices
Preceded by Hryhoriy Piatachenko	3rd Minister of Finance; 6 July 1994 – 18 June 1996	Succeeded by Valentyn Koronevsky
