= Valentyn Koronevsky =

Ukrainian economist and politician

- Валентин Короневський

4th Minister of Finance
- In office 18 June 1996 – 25 February 1997
- President: Leonid Kuchma
- Prime Minister: Pavlo Lazarenko
- Preceded by: Petro Hermanchuk
- Succeeded by: Ihor Mityukov

Personal details
- Born: 19 April 1950 (age 76) Izmail, Odesa Oblast, Ukrainian SSR, Soviet Union
- Spouse: Alla Oleksiivna
- Children: Dmytro
- Parent: Vera Yevdokymovna (mother)
- Education: Odesa National Economics University
- Profession: Economist politician

Valentyn Maksymovich Koronevsky (Ukrainian: Валентин Максимович Короневський; born 19 April 1950) is a Ukrainian economist and politician who was formerly the Minister of Finance from 1996 to 1997, and the deputy chairman of the State Savings Bank of Ukraine from 1997 to 1999.

== Biography ==
=== Early life and education ===
Koronevsky is born on 19 April 1950 in the city of Izmail, Ukraine SSR, and he received his diplomas from the Odesa College of Finance and Economics in 1968, and Odesa National Economics University in 1973, majoring in accounting.

=== Career ===
Prior to Koronevsky's ministerial role, he had held several early positions such as an economist of the financial department from August 1968 to March 1972; a senior economist from March 1972 to November 1975; the head of the local economy financing department from November 1975 to August 1985; the deputy head of the financial department and head of the budget department from August 1985 to May 1987; the deputy head of the financial department from May 1987 to October 1990; the head of the financial department of the executive committee of the Zaporizhzhia Regional Council of People's Deputies from October 1990 to December 1995; the head of the financial department of the Zaporizhzhia Regional State Administration from December 1995 to June 1996.

Koronevsky was named Minister of Finance of Ukraine, representative of Ukraine in the European Bank for Reconstruction and Development (EBRD) from 18 June 1996 to 25 February 1997. Later from August 1996 to 1997, he became a member of the National Security and Defense Council of Ukraine. Followed by being appointed as the deputy chairman of the Board of the State Savings Bank of Ukraine from April 1997 to 1999. From September 1999 to 22 August 2011, he became the deputy chairman of the Board of the Pension Fund of Ukraine. He made a business trip to the Mykolaiv Oblast from 19 to 20 November 2008, to familiarize with the operations of the Fund's offices in the Novoodeske neighborhood and the cities of Yuzhnoukrainsk and Voznesensk on 19 November 2008, moreover to particular attention to the concerns of filling the Fund's budget and the situation with financing the payment of pensions and cash assistance during the visit to the sub-departmental offices. On 14 July 2010, he was one of the representatives of Ukraine in the National Tripartite Socio-Economic Council.

== Personal life ==
Koronevsky is married to Alla Oleksiivna, and had a son named Dmytro in 1974.

== Honours ==
He has received the following honours:

- Honorary Diploma of the Cabinet of Ministers of Ukraine (April 2000)
- Honorary Diploma of the Verkhovna Rada of Ukraine (2005)
- Merited Economist of Ukraine (November 2006)

Political offices
Preceded by Petro Hermanchuk	4th Minister of Finance; 18 June 1996 – 25 February 1997	Succeeded by Ihor Mityukov
