= Oksana Markarova =

Ukrainian politician and economist (born 1976)

Her Excellency Oksana Markarova
- Оксана Маркарова
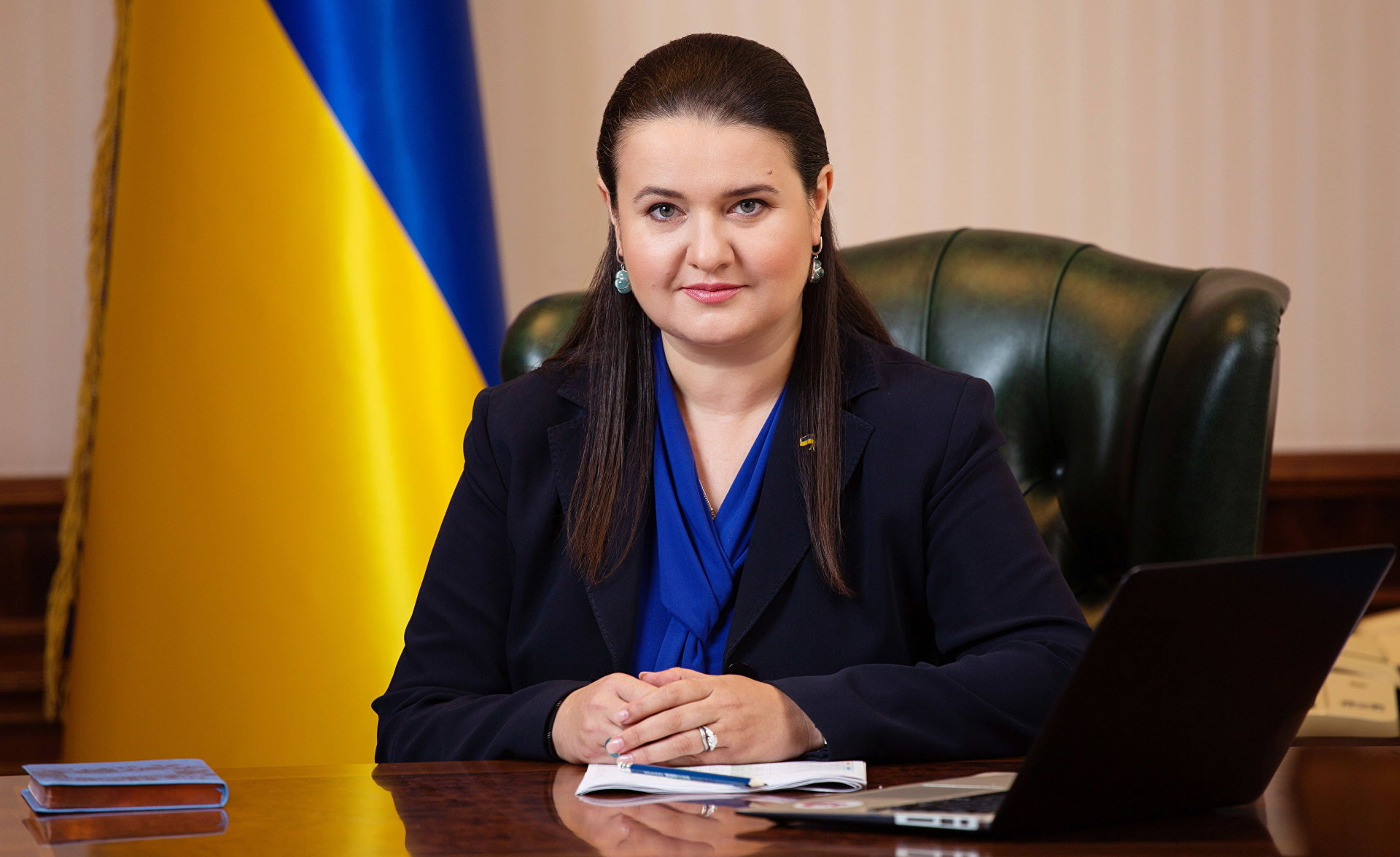
- Markarova in 2023

Ambassador of Ukraine to the United States
- In office 25 February 2021 – 27 August 2025
- Prime Minister: Volodymyr Groysman; Oleksiy Honcharuk
- Preceded by: Volodymyr Yelchenko
- Succeeded by: Olha Stefanishyna

Minister of Finance
- In office 8 June 2018 – 4 March 2020 (acting until 22 November 2018)
- Preceded by: Oleksandr Danylyuk
- Succeeded by: Ihor Umansky

Personal details
- Born: 28 October 1976 (age 50) Rovno, Ukrainian SSR, Soviet Union (now Rivne, Ukraine)
- Party: Independent
- Spouse: Danylo Volynets
- Children: 4
- Education: National University of Kyiv-Mohyla Academy; Indiana University School of Public and Environmental Affairs
- Awards: French National Order of Merit

Oksana Serhiyivna Markarova (Ukrainian: Оксана Сергіївна Маркарова; born 28 October 1976) is a Ukrainian politician and a former Ambassador of Ukraine to the United States serving February 2021 through August 2025. Markarova is also a former Minister of Finance in the government of Volodymyr Groysman and Oleksiy Honcharuk.

On 30 November 2025, Zelenskyy announced that Markarova would become his advisor on Ukraine's reconstruction and investments.

== Early life and education ==
Markarova was born on October 28, 1976, in the city of Rivne. Her father is an Armenian-Ukrainian. In 1999, Markarova received a master's degree in ecology at the Kyiv-Mohyla Academy. In 2001, she completed a master's degree in public finance and trade at the Indiana University School of Public and Environmental Affairs.

== Career ==
During 1998 and 1999 and from 2001 to 2003, Markarova worked as an economic policy advisor and a manager for external and corporate communications at the US direct investment fund Western NIS Enterprise Fund.

In 2000 Markarova interned in the US at the World Bank at the group in charge for banking and financial markets in Europe and Middle Asia.

She later became the Head of Board (President) of ITT-Invest company, and later the head of board of the Investment Group ITT. At ITT, she worked with Serhiy Mishchenko, who was the head of the supervisory board.

=== In Ukrainian government ===
Since March 2015 Markarova served as a Deputy Minister of Finance under successive ministers Natalie Jaresko and Oleksandr Danylyuk. In April 2016, she was appointed First Deputy Minister of Finance.

In 2015, Markarova initiated the creation of E-data (e-data.gov.ua), the largest open data portal in the public finance sector, which now includes modules spending.gov.ua, openbudget.gov.ua and proifi.gov.ua.

In addition to her duties as First Deputy Minister of Finance, she was also appointed the Commissioner for Investment on 8 August 2016, a position she held until her dismissal from the role on 10 January 2019. During that time, she managed the creation and operation of the UkraineInvest Investment Attraction and Support Office and initiated the creation of the Ukrainian Startup Fund.

After Oleksandr Danylyuk was dismissed on 7 June 2018 following a conflict with Prime Minister Volodymyr Groysman Markarova was appointed acting Minister of Finance on 8 June 2018. On 22 November 2018 the Ukrainian parliament appointed her as Minister of Finance. The beginning of the Shmyhal Government on 4 March 2020 was the end of her tenure as Minister of Finance.

After her dismissal Markarova returned to the private sector and her work on the supervisory board of the Kyiv-Mohyla Academy.

=== As Ambassador to the US ===
On 25 February 2021, Ukrainian president Volodymyr Zelenskyy appointed Markarova Ambassador of Ukraine to the United States.

Immediately after her appointment, Markarova said that her main priorities for the new position were expanding "cooperation with the Joseph Biden administration and political dialogue based on their broad bipartisan support" and "maximum assistance to the development of Ukrainian companies in the United States and attracting American companies to Ukraine".

On July 5, 2023, she was appointed Ambassador Extraordinary and Plenipotentiary of Ukraine to Antigua and Barbuda by the President of Ukraine.

On September 25, 2024, the Speaker of the U.S. House of Representatives, Mike Johnson, demanded that Ukraine remove Markarova as Ambassador to the United States after Zelenskyy visited an ammunition plant in Scranton, Pennsylvania, and appeared with several notable Democrats. In a letter from Johnson to Zelenskyy calling for her firing, Johnson claimed that the visit represented election interference in favor of the Democratic Party.

On July 7, 2025, The Kyiv Independent reported that Zelenskyy and Trump had discussed replacing Markarova with a different ambassador.

Markarova's tenure as Ambassador ended on August 27, 2025, when President Volodymyr Zelenskyy signed a decree appointing Olha Stefanishyna as her replacement. Her departure was part of a broader diplomatic reshuffle announced by Foreign Minister Andrii Sybiha in July 2025, who described her as "extremely effective, charismatic and one of our most successful ambassadors" while noting that "every diplomat has a rotation cycle."

=== Presidential advisor ===
On 30 November 2025, Zelenskyy announced that Markarova would become his advisor on Ukraine's reconstruction and investments.

== Awards ==
In 2018, Markarova received the Open Data Leader Award.

On 16 December 2020, Oksana Markarova received the French National Order of Merit.

On 28 December 2022, Markarova received the Order of Princess Olga, 3rd Class.

== Other activities ==
- European Bank for Reconstruction and Development (EBRD), Ex-Officio Member of the Board of Governors (since 2018)

== Personal life ==
Markarova is married to banker and businessman Danylo Volynets. The family has four children.

== See also ==
- Hroysman Government – Government of Ukraine
- Honcharuk Government – Government of Ukraine

Political offices
Preceded by Oleksandr Danylyuk	Minister of Finance; 2018–2020	Succeeded by Ihor Umansky
