= Oleksandr Korotko =

Ukrainian writer

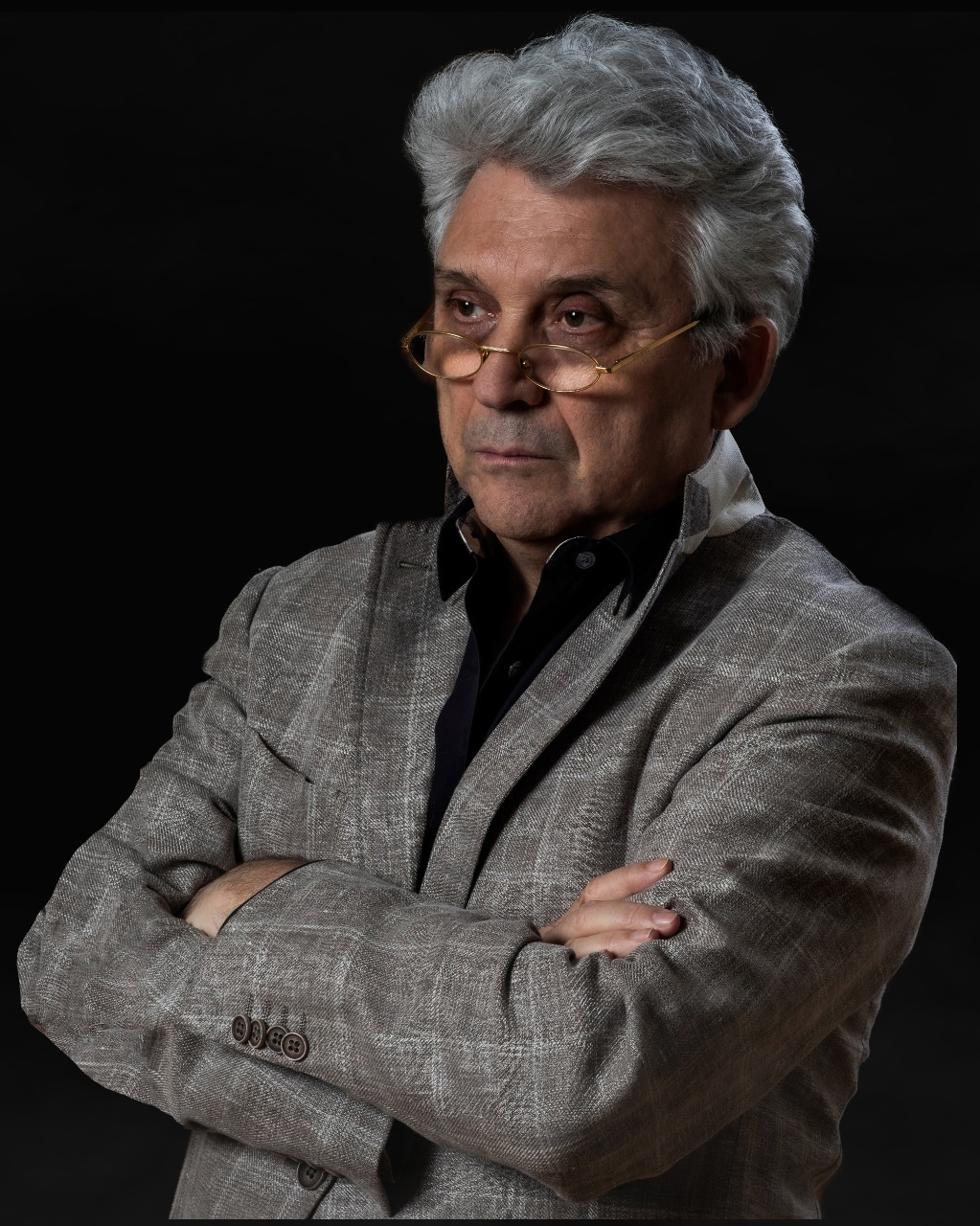
- Born: August 29, 1952 (age 74); Korosten, USSR
- Education: Odesa National University of Economics
- Occupations: Рoet, writer, essayist
- Writing career
- Genres: essays, philosophical poetry

Oleksandr Korotko (born August 29, 1952 Korosten, USSR) is a Ukrainian poet, writer, essayist. Member of the Belgian PEN Club, an honorary member of the British PEN Club (English PEN).

Academician of the European Academy of Sciences, Arts and Literature, member of the Writers' Union of Israel. The representative of the modern avant-garde trend in philosophical poetry.

== Biography ==
He was born on August 29, 1952, in the small Ukrainian town of Korosten. Father Shimon Korotko was a participant in the World War II. For many years he was the Chairman of the Jewish religious community of Simferopol (Autonomous Republic of Crimea). A Jewish cultural centre is named after him «Hesed Shimon». Mother Maria Korotko is a textile industry technologist.

Olexander Korotko graduated from high school in Odesa № 21, then graduated from the Odesa National Economics University. Lives in Kyiv.

== Literary career ==
The beginning of «official» literary activity dates back to the second half of the ‘80s when Alexander Korotko began publishing in the «Literary Newspaper». The first collection of poems «Window» was published by «Youth» in 1989. Echoes of the Silver Age, traditions of classical poetry, and a pronounced modernist orientation were intertwined in the works.

Olexander Korotko is the author of more than thirty books of poetry and prose; works are included in poetic anthologies, almanacks, magazines, as well as online publications of different countries. Many of his works have been translated into Hebrew, English, French, German, Polish, Greek, Croatian and Ukrainian.

Poetry is represented by poems in one stanza and larger in form, rhyming and non-rhyming poetic works. In different years the poems «Abraham and Yitzhak», «Joseph and Jacob», «Jerusalem», «Venice», «Paris», «Bakhchisarai», «Beloved by the Sun», «Dawn Towards», «Stus», «Dream Embankment», great poetic cycles, treatises, parales and others were written.

He is also the author of poetic books: «Night Well», «Everyday Mind», «Applause of the Dead Hands», «Decoclorized Dreams» translated by Boris Chip, an album of single-line poems «Transcription of Thought» with illustrations by Karaite artist Mikhail Kazas, whose work belongs to the Silver Age, collections «There are birds of parting love», «Favorites. Poetics».

The list of publications also includes nine books translated into other languages. Poetic books: «On Both Sides of Love» translated into English by Richard McKenna, «The Anthill of Silent» translated into French by Alexander Karvovsky, «Intervention of the Sun» translated into Ukrainian by Lyudmila Brendak; book-poem «Abraham and Yitzhak» translated into Hebrew by Hawa Korzakova was published in Israel. Translated editions: «La Grenouille rouge» («Red Frog») a collection of poems translated into French by Nicole Laurent-Katris and Dmitry Chistyak published in Paris, «Irrazionalismo» («Irrational») poems translated into English by Anatoly Kudryavitsky – in Dublin. The book of prose «Moon Boy» translated into Ukrainian by Volodymyr Danylenko was published in Kyiv and «Ragazzo di luna»(«Moon Boy»), which was translated into Italian by Annarita Tavani, – in Milan.

In 2001, based on Oleksandr Korotko's early poetry, the People's Artist of Ukraine Vitaliy Malakhov staged the play «Celestial's Quarter» at the avant-garde Kyiv Theater on Podil, which was part of the theatre's repertoire for several years. It was later shown at the Ivan Franko National Drama Theater in Kyiv.

In 2010, the book «Abraham and Yitzchak» was presented to readers again, this time the plot took the form of a play, which was published in Israel (Jerusalem, «Philobiblon», 2012).

Оlexander Korotko took part in the 3rd International Biennial of Poets in Moscow.

The last large-scale project «Poetic Evening for Two», which involved Bella Akhmadulina and Olexander Korotko, ended the era of «big halls» in 2000 in Kyiv, on the stage of the National Drama Theater named after Ivan Franko.

Olexander Korotko was a participant in a series of programs on Israeli radios «Kol Israel» and «River». One of the meetings on the air was recorded and released as an audio album «Abraham and Isaac» – the poem sounded in the author's reading.

From 2014 to 2020 he worked in the field of poetry and prose, gave several major interviews for online and print publications.

== Family ==
His wife, Liudmyla, is an economist by education and a former classmate of Oleksandr Korotko. Married since 1973. They have two daughters: the eldest Hanna graduated from the Medical University, Candidate of Medical Sciences, works as a doctor, the youngest daughter Yevheniia was educated at the Kyiv Institute of International Relations. Alexander has three grandchildren. The Korotko couple and the eldest daughter's family live in Kyiv; the youngest daughter with husband and two children – in the USA.

== Awards and prizes ==
- Laureate of the Literary Prize of the Academy. Mihai Eminescu (Romania, 2017).
- Winner of the Grand Literary Prize «The Love of Freedom» (Paris 2017).
- Laureate of the Literary Prize. Maximilian Kiriyenko-Voloshin (Kyiv, 2018).
- Laureate of the Premio Milano International literary award, "Special Prize for Creativity" (Milan, 2021).
