= Hryhoriy Piatachenko =

Ukrainian economist and politician (1932–2022)

- Григорій П'ятаченко
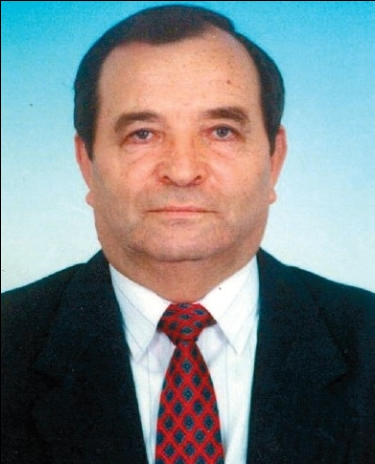

2nd Minister of Finance
- In office 29 October 1991 – 6 July 1994
- President: Leonid Kuchma
- Prime Minister: Vitaliy Masol; Yukhym Zvyahilsky
- Preceded by: Oleksandr Kovalenko
- Succeeded by: Petro Hermanchuk

Personal details
- Born: 22 March 1932 Velykyi Step, Vinnytsia Oblast, Ukrainian SSR, Soviet Union
- Died: 27 March 2022 (aged 90) Kyiv, Kyiv Oblast, Ukraine
- Education: Lviv University of Trade and Economics (PhD)
- Profession: Economist politician

Hryhoriy Oleksandrovich Piatachenko (Ukrainian: Григорій Олександрович П'ятаченко; 22 March 1932 – 27 March 2022) was a Ukrainian economist and politician who was formerly the Minister of Finance from 1991 to 1994.

== Biography ==
=== Early life and education ===
Piatachenko was born on 22 March 1932 in the village of Velykyi Step, Ukraine SSR. He was 11 years old during the onset of the Second World War. Tragically, famine, oppression, war, and the challenging post-war rehabilitation of the nation marked his early years. In 1949, he completed his education and enrolled at Mukachiv Cooperative Technical College, earning an honors degree from the technical college. He obtained his PhD in economics from the Lviv University of Trade and Economics in 1956. In 1970, he successfully defended his thesis and was awarded a candidate of economic sciences diploma.

Prior to Piatachenko's ministerial role, he had held several early positions such as the deputy chief accountant of Rybnytskyi Developments Sakhkamin of the Ministry of Food Industry of the Ukrainian SSR from 1956 to1958; the deputy chief accountant for financial issues of the Sakhkamin trust of the Vinnytsia state farm from 1958 to 1960; the deputy chief accountant of the Vinnytsia Councilor Farm from 1960 to 1965; the deputy head of the financial department of the Ministry of Food Industry from 1966 to 1972; the head of the financial department of the Ministry of Food Industry of the Ukrainian SSR from 1972 to 1984; the head of the finance department of the State Planning from 1984 to 1991.

=== Ministerial career ===
From July to October 1991, Piatachenko was appointed as the Deputy Minister of Economy, only to be later promoted to Minister of Finance of Ukraine from 29 October 1991 to 6 July 1994. At that time, Ukraine was incorporated into the network of international financial organizations. The Law of Ukraine was enacted by the Verkhovna Rada in June 1992. On Ukraine's Admission to the Multilateral Investment Guarantee Agency, the International Finance Corporation, the International Development Association, and the International Bank for Reconstruction and Development (IBRD). The Agreement between Piatachenko and the International Monetary Fund (IMF) was signed on 3 September 1992, in Washington. It was made possible for Ukraine to join the IBRD and the European Bank for Reconstruction and Development (EBRD) after it became the 168th member of the Fund.

Creating the framework for a national financial policy and its own financial system was one of the key goals of the Ukrainian state-building process. The necessity of setting up a Scientific Research Financial Institute (NDFI) within the Ukrainian Ministry of Finance was brought up by Piatachenko in 1993. The Research Financial Institute, a part of the Ministry of Finance, was formed by Decision No. 424 of the Ukrainian Cabinet of Ministers dated 7 July 1993. It became the first scientific institution in the nation to study state financial policy and a facility for training scientists in the subject of "Finance, Money Circulation and Credit" for the financial system.

=== Later life ===
With other positions held by Piatachenko were member of the editorial board of the magazine Finance of Ukraine; Honorary Director of the Research Financial Institute of the Academy of Financial Management of the Ministry of Finance of Ukraine. He received an invitation to lead NDFI in 1994. The laborious process of establishing the organizational framework, establishing an academic council, and choosing the academic staff got under way.

Piatachenko personally contributed to the organization of the International Conference on the study of the world experience of implementing monetary reforms in Kyiv while serving as director of the Research Financial Institute under the Ministry of Finance, to which representatives of the relevant professional structures of the United States, Canada, Germany, and other countries were invited to participate. The Ukrainian President, the Cabinet of Ministers, and the Verkhovna Rada all presented appropriate suggestions for consideration. Beginning in early September 1996, Ukraine implemented the monetary reform.

=== Death ===
Piatachenko died at the age of 90 in Kyiv on 27 March 2022. According to the Ministry of Finance, "Hryhoriy Oleksandrovych actively contributed to the formulation and execution of financial policy as well as structural alterations in Ukraine's financial sector. He worked hard to have Ukraine accepted into international financial organizations while serving as the country's finance minister, especially the International Monetary Fund, the International Bank for Reconstruction and Development, the International Finance Corporation, and others."

== Honours ==
Throughout his career, he has been awarded the following honours;

- Honorary Diploma of the Cabinet of Ministers of Ukraine (July 2003)

Political offices
Preceded by Oleksandr Kovalenko	2nd Minister of Finance; 29 October 1991 – 6 July 1994	Succeeded by Petro Hermanchuk
