= Liberal Democratic Party of Ukraine =

Liberal Democratic Party of Ukraine Ліберально-демократична партія України
- Founded: 17 July 1992
- Ideology: Liberalism
- Political position: Centre-right
- Colours: Orange
- Verkhovna Rada: 0 / 450

Website
- https://www.ldpu.org.ua/eng/

The Liberal Democratic Party of Ukraine (Ukrainian: Ліберально-демократична партія України, romanized: Liberalno-demokratychna partiya Ukrayiny) is a political party in Ukraine registered in July 1992.

As an organization, the party traces its history to 1989 as the Ukrainian branch of Liberal Democratic Party of the Soviet Union and was based on the People's Union in Support of Reforms (Perestroika). In late 1990, it split, and its Kiev branch (Kiev Liberal Democratic Union) later joined the Party of Democratic Revival of Ukraine. Their logo is nearly identical to the logo of the Liberal Democrats of the United Kingdom.

At the parliamentary elections 1998, the party was part of the European choice of Ukraine alliance. At the parliamentary elections 2002 the party was part of the Team of Winter Generation alliance. Both alliances won a marginal number of votes and no seats. On 3 March 2006, the party announced at its website that it will not take part in the parliamentary elections on 26 March 2006 because of "regional egoism". The party did not participate in the Ukrainian parliamentary elections of 2006 and 2007. In the 2012 Ukrainian parliamentary election, the party competed for 1 constituency (seat), but it did not win this constituency and thus missed parliamentary representation. The party did not participate in the 2014 Ukrainian parliamentary election.

== See also ==
- Contributions to liberal theory
- Liberal democracy
- Liberalism in Ukraine
- Liberal Democratic Party of Russia, Russian branch of the former Liberal Democratic Party of the Soviet Union
