= Serhiy Marchenko =

Ukrainian economist and politician (born 1981)

Sergii Marchenko
- Сергій Марченко
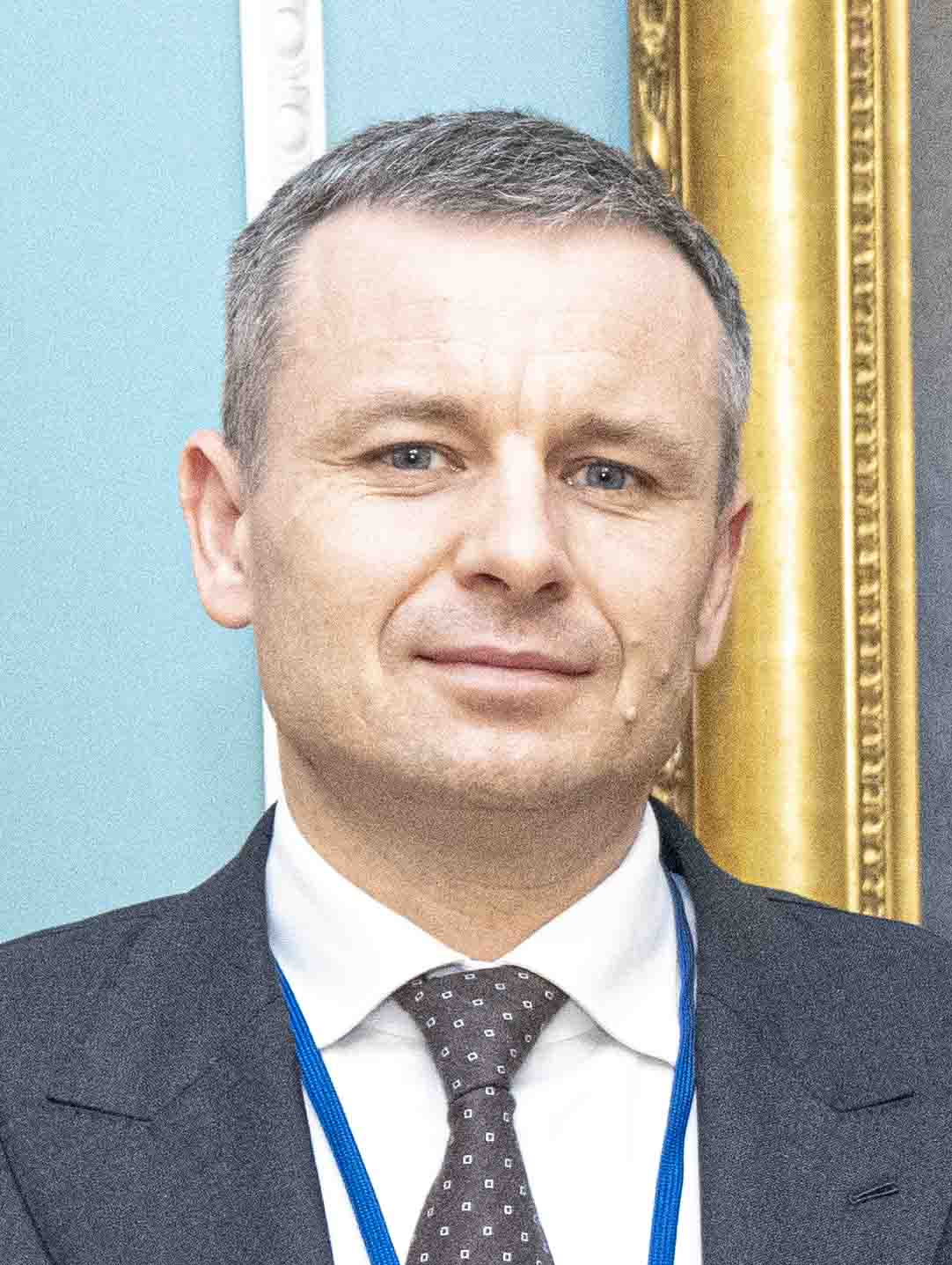
- Marchenko in 2024

Minister of Finance
- Incumbent
- Assumed office 30 March 2020
- President: Volodymyr Zelenskyy
- Prime Minister: Denys Shmyhal; Yulia Svyrydenko; Serhii Koretskyi
- Preceded by: Ihor Umansky

Personal details
- Born: 24 January 1981 (age 45) Makariv, Ukrainian SSR, Soviet Union
- Party: Independent
- Education: Academy of the State Tax Service of Ukraine
- Occupation: Economist; Politician

Sergii Mykhailovych Marchenko (Ukrainian: Сергій Михайлович Марченко; born 24 January 1981) is a Ukrainian economist and politician currently serving as Minister of Finance of Ukraine since 30 March 2020. Previously, he has served as Deputy Minister of Finance of Ukraine from 2016 to 2018 and as Deputy Head of the Presidential Administration of Ukraine from 2018 to 2019.

Honorary Professor of Practice at the Kyiv School of Economics (2024). Chair of the Board of Governors of the International Monetary Fund and the World Bank (2023).

== Early life and education ==
In 2002 Marchenko graduated from the State Tax Service Academy with the master's degree in Public Finance Management (diploma with honours, the President of Ukraine scholar in 2001–2002).

In 2009 Marchenko obtained a PhD degree in economics (Candidate of Economic Sciences).

Starting from 2002 Marchenko worked on several positions in the Ministry of Finance, State Tax Administration, Finance and Banking Committee and the Secretariat of Cabinet of Ministers.

=== Career of an Economist ===
He studied at the Academy of International Cooperation in Germany in a program for senior executives, at the Harvard Kennedy School in the United States, at the University of Warsaw in Poland, and at the Korea International Cooperation Agency (KOICA) in the Republic of Korea.

In 2011 Marchenko participated in the Management and Leadership Program at Harvard Kennedy School, and he began his work at the Presidential Coordination Center of Reforms Implementation. He participated in Budget Code development. The Code was adopted in 2014. This Code is important particularly because of fiscal decentralization reform. Mr. Marchenko coordinated the preparation of a package of legislative bills aimed at changing the budgeting and improvement of autonomy of healthcare institutions.

Starting 2014, he worked as an expert for Bendukidze Free Market Center, one of the largest Ukrainian think tanks developing modern policy options and engagement strategies with decision-makers in government, business, and society and developed a concept of the Program of Leadership in Public Finance and then implemented it with Kyiv school of economics in 2015–2016.

=== Political career before heading the Ministry of Finance of Ukraine ===
From 2016 to 2018 he worked as Deputy Minister of Finance, leading the social and humanitarian sector.

From 2018 to 2019 Marchenko held the position of Deputy Head of the Presidential Administration.

In the 2019 Ukrainian parliamentary election Marchenko was number 7 on the election list of the party Ukrainian Strategy of Groysman. The party failed to win any seats.

Member of the NSDC since 7 April 2020.

=== Leadership of the Ministry of Finance of Ukraine ===
On 30th Match 2020 year on the second attempt was appointed a Minister of Finance of Ukraine.

In July 2020 as a Minister of Finance he was ranked No. 4 in Top-40 most influential young politicians in Ukraine according to Correspondent magazine.

In 2023, he chaired the Board of Governors of the World Bank and the International Monetary Fund. The decision on his appointment was unanimously approved by all member countries during the annual autumn joint session of the IMF and the World Bank in Washington.

In a statement regarding his appointment, Serhiy Marchenko noted:

[...] This happened for the first time in 30 years of Ukraine's membership in the World Bank and the IMF. [...] It is a great honor to represent Ukraine on the international financial stage. The new status will enhance the effectiveness of cooperation with international financial organizations and the member countries of the World Bank and the IMF.

Since 26 January 2023, Marchenko is co-chairman of the Multi-Agency Donor Coordination Platform for Ukraine.

In November 2023, he was recognized as one of the 15 leaders in the "Public Administration" category of the "UP-100 List of Ukraine's Leaders" ranking by the publication Ukrainian Pravda.

The Minister of Finance of Ukraine has several deputies: Denys Uliutin, Oleksandr Kava, Roman Yermolychev, Svitlana Vorobei, Olha Zykova, Yuriy Draghanchuk, and Oleksandr Hrubiyan.

== Other activities ==
- World Bank, Ex-Officio Member of the Board of Governors (since 2020)

== Personal life ==
Married to Marina Marchenko. The couple has three children: Aurora, Leonid, and Demyan.

Sergii Marchenko is passionate about triathlon, having participated in three Ironman 70.3 or "Half Ironman" races (1.9 km swimming, 90 km cycling, and 21 km running). He successfully finished two of them in Turkey and Finland. In Portugal, he got injured during the cycling portion and could not complete the race.

== See also ==
- Shmygal Government

Political offices
Preceded by Ihor Umansky	Minister of Finance; 2020–present	Incumbent
