= Oleksandr Danylyuk =

Ukrainian politician

- Олександр Данилюк
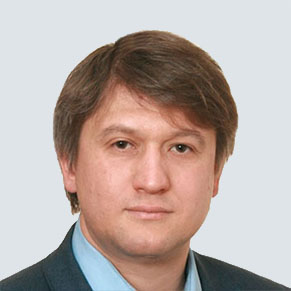

Secretary of the National Security and Defense Council
- In office 28 May 2019 – 30 September 2019
- President: Volodymyr Zelenskyy
- Preceded by: Oleksandr Turchynov
- Succeeded by: Oleksiy Danilov

Minister of Finance of Ukraine
- In office 14 April 2016 – 7 June 2018
- Prime Minister: Volodymyr Groysman
- Preceded by: Natalie Jaresko
- Succeeded by: Oksana Markarova

Personal details
- Born: 22 July 1975 (age 51) Grigoriopol, Moldavian SSR, Soviet Union (now Moldova)
- Party: Independent
- Education: Kyiv Polytechnic Institute; Indiana University, Bloomington
- Occupation: Politician / Investment Banker

Oleksandr Oleksandrovych Danylyuk (Ukrainian: Олександр Олександрович Данилюк, born 22 July 1975) is a Ukrainian politician and military serviceman who served as the Secretary of the National Security and Defense Council (2019), the Minister of Finance of Ukraine (2016-2018). Danylyuk is a co-founder and the Head of the Center for National Resilience and Development.

== Early life and education ==
Oleksandr Danylyuk was born in a family of scientists. His father, Oleksandr Danylyuk, is a member of the National Academy of Sciences of Ukraine, while the mother, Lyudmila Danyliuk, taught cybernetics at the Igor Sikorsky Kyiv Polytechnic Institute.

Oleksandr Danylyuk graduated from the National Technical University of Ukraine with a degree in electric engineering in 1998. He also studied at the Kyiv Institute of Investment Management (1995) and obtained MBA from the Indiana University Kelley School of Business in 2001.

== Career ==
=== Work in the Private Sector ===
Oleksandr Danylyuk worked in the private sector as a consultant and investment manager in a number of companies, including TEKT, Alfa Capital and Western NIS Enterprise Fund (WNISEF) in Ukraine.

Later Danylyuk worked at McKinsey & Company London and Moscow offices for three years. His project portfolio included reform of the UK tax system as well as strategy development and operations optimization in energy and telecom projects.

Between 2006 and 2010, Danylyuk chaired the Rurik Investment fund that operated in London and Luxembourg.

=== Public Service ===
Oleksandr Danylyuk first joined public service in 2005 as economic advisor to the Ukrainian Prime Minister Yuriy Yekhanurov. In his team Danylyuk worked on energy reform and carried out privatization of state-owned enterprises, including Kryvorizhstal, Ukraine's largest integrated steel company, which became part of the global steel producer Mittal Steel Company N.V.

Ukrainian President Viktor Yanukovych appointed Danylyuk his adviser (out of state). In 2010–2015, Danylyuk chaired the Economic Reforms Coordination Center – an apolitical think tank under the aegis of the Presidential Administration of Ukraine. McKinsey & Company drafted the initial strategy of the center. He won the competition for the position. The Economic Reforms Coordination Center focused on drafting bills and introducing practices designed to improve investment climate in Ukraine, uphold the rule of law and intensify cooperation with the International Monetary Fund.

Danylyuk actively supported signing of the EU-Ukraine association agreement, despite active opposition within the Government of the pro-Russian lobbyists. The Coordination center developed the holistic reform agenda which acts as a foundation of the transformations following Revolution of Dignity.

President Yanukovych largely ignored this Coordination Centre. Danylyuk was dismissed as advisor by acting President Oleksandr Turchynov on 24 February 2014. March 2014 –July 2014 Oleksandr Danylyuk headed group of advisors to the Vice-Prime minister Volodymyr Groysman.

On 17 July 2014 he worked as a permanent representative of the President of Ukraine in the Cabinet of Ministers of Ukraine.

From September 2015 he worked as a deputy head of Presidential Administration of Ukraine.

=== Minister of Finance ===
In 2016, Oleksandr Danylyuk was appointed a Minister of Finance. He declared his key objectives at the position – better investment climate in Ukraine, transparent rules of doing business for Ukrainian entrepreneurs and foreign investors and public finance reform.

The government's mid-term priority action plan for 2020 outlines key milestones that the Ministry of Finance has to achieve. Danyliuk's team also designed the Public Finance Administration Strategy 2017–2021 which enables effective planning and better quality of public services with taxpayers' money.

Ministry of Finance priorities under the leadership of Danylyuk was:State Fiscal Service reform and its transformation from a punitive agency in a service-oriented agency, Financial Investigation Service to replace tax police, Customs reform, Improving tax legislation, Introduction of mid-term budget planning, Implementation of the State Banks Development Strategy, E-Data project development for public spending, Audit reform, Internal reform to drive reforms in other areas.

On 7 June 2018, Ukraine's parliament voted in support of Prime Minister Volodymyr Groysman's motion to dismiss Finance Minister Danylyuk.

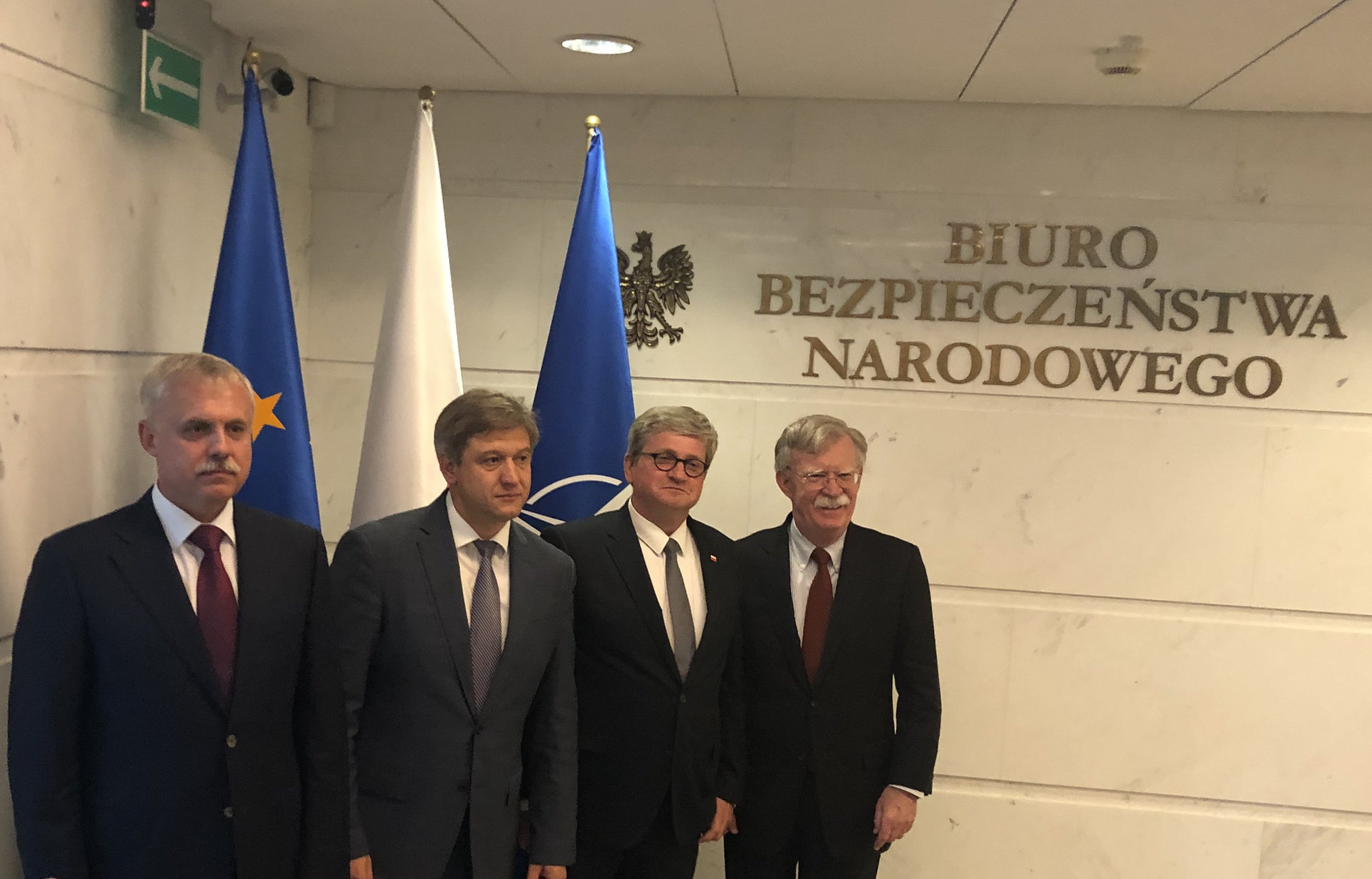
Danylyuk with John Bolton (far right), Paweł Soloch (center right), and Stanislav Zas (far left) in Warsaw.

Groysman had asked for Danylyuk's dismissal in response to Danylyuk's May 2018 letter to the ambassadors of the G-7 top industrial nations saying that Groysman was stalling vital reforms of the State Fiscal Service that are needed to combat corruption. Groysman said Danylyuk's actions may have hurt Ukraine's negotiations with the European Union about economic aid. Danylyuk stated that he had been asked to use government money to fund particular politicians favoured projects, effectively to back political corruption. Danylyuk stated that Groysman seek his dismissal to prevent reform of State Fiscal Service notoriously known for its corruption and headed by the Groysman old ally Prodan.

Danylyuk initiated dismissal of Roman Nasirov, Head of State Fiscal Service, whom he accused of corruption and sabotaging reforms in tax administration. He filed the respective cases with the National Anti-Corruption Bureau of Ukraine (NABU). Nasirov, who enjoyed support of many influential people in power, was later investigated and formally accused by NABU of corruption. Danylyuk used this as formal pretext to remove him from his position in Feb 2017, and later 2018 despite significant push back from the prime-minister succeeded in firing him permanently.

==== Cooperation with IMF and return to markets ====
Shortly after appointment Danylyuk renewed cooperation with IMF after long pause which allowed to unlock funding. Danylyuk leveraged trusted relationship with IMF.

==== Nationalization of Privatbank ====
In December 2016 the largest bank in the country PrivatBank was nationalized. Ministry of Finance became the sole shareholder. The preparatory work lasted for more than a year with National Bank and Ministry of Finance taking leading role. The bank was owned by two influential businessmen Ihor Kolomoyskyi and Gennadiy Bogolyubov.

PrivatBank was a systemic bank with more than 22 mln customers. As a part of amicable agreement on nationalisation Kolomoyskyi and Bogolyubov agreed to compensate losses of State related to nationalisation within 6 months following completion of the nationalisation. After failing of delivering on this commitment Government initiated criminal proceedings against former shareholders of Privatbank.

==== Freezing of Assets of Kolomoyskyi ====
In December 2017 London Court imposed worldwide freeze of assets of former shareholders of PrivatBank. Danylyuk played an instrumental role in this process overcoming resistance of Prosecutor general and other high level officials who attempted to prevent decision of assets freezing. To prevent it several criminal proceeding were opened against advisors hired by the National Bank of Ukraine, Ministry of Finance and Privatbank. Court banned any decision related to initiating legal proceedings outside Ukraine, etc. Despite all the opposing efforts, the WWFA was imposed and stays by now.

==== State fiscal service reform ====
Oleksandr Danylyuk has repeatedly stressed that reformation of State Fiscal Service is one of the key anti-corruption initiatives, as it will help to improve the business climate in Ukraine. "The State Fiscal Service needs to continue the modernization of its approach to work. Working with the State Fiscal Service should be more convenient for every taxpayer." Danylyuk integrated State Fiscal Service reform into the program of cooperation with the IMF, additionally creating a project supervisory board, which included G7 ambassadors, an IMF representative and a business ombudsman.

Later, this escalated into a conflict between, back then, the head of the Finance Ministry and Prime Minister Volodymyr Groysman, when during negotiations with the МВФ, the PM overturned decisions that launched the reform.

==== Creation of anti-corruption bodies ====
Prior to Danylyuk's appointment as the Minister of Finance, he played an active role in implementation of anticorruption reforms in Ukraine.

He was in charge of the development of the Law on National Anticorruption Bureau (NABU) in cooperation with experts and civil society activists, and lobbied its adoption. The law provided good framework for establishing NABU and protecting its independence.

Introduced a system of electronic declarations and recruitment to the National Agency on Corruption Prevention (NACP).

Supported adoption of the law for launching the High Anti-corruption court. In June 2018, he sent a personal letter to every PM, explaining the importance of adopting the law and urged them to do so.

==== Abolition of corrupted Tax Police ====
Danylyuk actively promoted the reform of the law enforcement institutions. He took actions at abolition of the Tax Police, a highly corrupt institution that harassed Ukrainian business.

Despite strong resistance of the President, Prime-minister and the Parliament the law that de facto removed any powers from Tax Police was passed. Realizing the mistake, coalition attempted to fix the problem by adopting the law returning the powers to the Tax Police.

Danylyuk addressed the Parliament with pledged not to restore tax police. It was first time in history when Minister publicly opposed the parliamentary coalition and the President in the parliament. In the confusion parliament took the position of the minister refusing adopting the changes. Position to restore the Tax police was promoted by President Poroshenko's ally Nina Yuzhanina.

=== Secretary of the National Security and Defense Council (2019) ===
On 28 May 2019, Danylyuk was appointed Secretary of the National Security and Defense Council of Ukraine – the main organizational body for national security and defense under the President of Ukraine. From June 2019 onwards, he became a head of the National Cyber Security Coordination Center. In July, he joined the National Council for Anti-Corruption Policy. On 27 September 2019, Danylyuk wrote a resignation letter from the post of Secretary of the National Security and Defense Council. He explained his decision by disagreeing with the policy of "carpet games" in the new government. "Many of those who came lack professionalism. This is a systemic problem that carries a risk. I hope that conclusions will be made and the President will make some adjustments," he told reporters.

=== Chairman of the Supervisory Board of the National Depository ===
On 25 September 2020, Danylyuk was elected chairman of the supervisory board of the National Depository. On 28 April 2021 the shareholders of the National Depository of Ukraine terminated his powers. Danylyuk claimed this was done "to appoint a person convenient for the Presidential Administration."

=== Disqualification in the competition for the head of the Bureau of Economic Security ===
In 2021 Danylyuk applied as head for the new Bureau of Economic Security. The (then) new law enforcement body of investigating economic crimes. On 29 July 2021 Danylyuk was rejected to take part in the competition of selection because he could not provide a diploma of higher education in a specialty that did meet the requirements of the competition.

== Center for National Resilience and Development ==
In December 2020, Oleksandr Danylyuk alongside Minister of Foreign Affairs of Ukraine (2014-2019) Pavlo Klimkin and Prosecutor General of Ukraine (2019-2020) Ruslan Riaboshapka founded Center for National Resilience and Development.

== Earnings ==
According to an electronic declaration, in 2019 Danylyuk received a salary of ₴297,395 (US$11,015) as Secretary of the National Security and Defense Council of Ukraine, and ₴1,692,125 (US$62,671) as royalties. On bank accounts, Danylyuk had US$3,130, €45,895 and ₴1,635. He also declared US$36,000 in cash. Additionally, Danylyuk declared a cottage (total area of 290 m^{2}) and a plot of land (total area of 984 m^{2}), both in joint ownership. Danylyuk also declared a 2017 Volvo xx60 car and an antique (Sector Watch – gourmet Swiss, silver, the beginning of the 20th century).

== Family ==
Oleksandr Danyliuk is married and has three children. His wife, Lilia Litkovska, born in Kyiv, is an established Ukrainian designer and the founder of LITKOVSKA brand. The brand is sold in multiple countries including France, Japan, and the UK. LITKOVSKA has been in the official program of Paris Fashion Week since 2016.

Danyliuk has two sons: Richard (born in 2001) and Volodymyr (born in 2008). Danyliuk's elder son Richard, studies chemistry at the Cambridge University. The younger son goes to the Millfield School.

The couple also raises the daughter Radomyra (born in 2019).

Danylyuk speaks five languages: Ukrainian, Russian, English, Spanish and French.

Political offices
Preceded by Natalie Jaresko	Minister of Finance; 2016–2018	Succeeded by Oksana Markarova
Preceded by Oleksandr Turchynov	Secretary of the National Security and Defense Council; 2019	Succeeded by Oleksiy Danilov
