= Fedir Yaroshenko =

Ukrainian politician and economist (born 1949)

- Федір Ярошенко
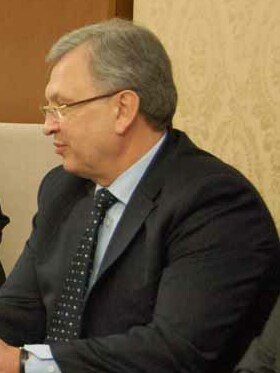
- Yaroshenko in 2011

11th Minister of Finance
- In office 11 March 2010 – 18 January 2012
- President: Viktor Yanukovych
- Prime Minister: Mykola Azarov
- Preceded by: Ihor Umanskyi (acting)
- Succeeded by: Valeriy Khoroshkovskyi

Personal details
- Born: 5 December 1949 (age 76) Khartsyzk, Donetsk Oblast, Ukrainian SSR, Soviet Union
- Spouse: Nina Hryhorivna
- Children: Oleksii; Yurii
- Education: Luhansk National Agrarian University
- Profession: Economist; Politician

Military service
- Allegiance: Soviet Union
- Branch/service: Soviet Army

Fedir Oleksiiovych Yaroshenko (Ukrainian: Федір Олексійович Ярошенко; born 5 December 1949) is a Ukrainian economist and politician who was Head of the State Tax Administration of Ukraine from 2004 to 2005, and Minister of Finance from 2010 to 2012.

== Early life and education ==
Yaroshenko was born on 5 December 1949 in the city of Khartsyzk, Ukraine SSR, and his major at the Voroshilovgrad Agricultural Institute was Economics and Organization of Agriculture, and he earned his diploma there in 1976.

== Career ==
Prior to Yaroshenko's ministerial role, he had held several early positions such as a machinist at the Zuhres Energy and Mechanical Plant from 1967 to 1968, a laboratory assistant at the Chemistry Department of the Voroshilovgrad Agricultural Institute from 1970 to 1971 after serving in the army, a chief accountant at the Zuhres Plemptycer State Farm from 1976 to 1979, the director at the Novoselydivska poultry farm in Tsukuryne from 1979 to 1984, the director at the Yenakiivska poultry farm in Yenakieve from 1984 to 1994, and the general director at the Donetskptakhoprom production association in Yenakieve from 1994 to 1997. His work with the government began as the first deputy head of the State Tax Administration of Ukraine (STAU) Mykola Azarov from 1997 to 2002, the first deputy to the Minister of Finance from 2002 to 2004, the head of the State Tax Administration of Ukraine from 2004 to 2005, and the head of the group of advisers of the VBF Garant in Kyiv from 2007 to 2008.

=== Minister of Finance ===
On 11 March 2010, he has been appointed as the Minister of Finance in Mykola Azarov's government. Later that year, he added in a conversation with the governors, improvements will be made, giving them the chance to fix any bottlenecks in the new budget. He would take part in the organizational committee for the preparation and holding of the high-level meeting "Kyiv Summit on Safe and Innovative Use of Nuclear Energy" on 22 February 2011. On 18 January 2012, he resigned by decree of President Viktor Yanukovych, therefore replaced by Valeriy Khoroshkovski. No reason for his resignation was given and only expressed his wish for his successor to operate efficiently and without many blunders in broadcast remarks.

=== Resignation ===
According to Yaroshenko, following the meeting with the president, he requested the president's unilateral dismissal from his position as Minister of Finance. The Head of State agreed with his suggestion and he decided to write a statement on his own. Under criticism for a $15 billion IMF loan that had been rejected, Yaroshenko resigned. The IMF stopped an aid package last spring because Kyiv refused to raise home gas prices and reduce government spending as a result. This has put pressure on Ukraine's budget. To maintain the hryvna, the central bank had to use its reserves. He urged Moscow for cheaper gas as he was hesitant to take the hard step of hiking household gas prices before the parliamentary elections later that year. Moreover, in an effort to divert criticism of his administration ahead of that fall's legislative elections, he has regularly lambasted Prime Minister Mykola Azarov over economic and other issues.

== Personal life ==
Yaroshenko is married to Nina Hryhorivna, and had two children together; Oleksiya and Yuriya.

== Honours ==
Throughout his career, he has been awarded the following honours;

- Order of Merit First Class
- Order of Merit Second Class (October 2000)
- Order of Merit Third Class (August 1998)
- Merited Economist of Ukraine
- Honorary Diploma of the Cabinet of Ministers of Ukraine (June 2004)
- State Prize of Ukraine in Science and Technology (2004)

Political offices
Preceded by Ihor Umanskyi (acting)	11th Minister of Finance; 11 March 2010 – 18 January 2012	Succeeded by Valeriy Khoroshkovskyi
