= Ihor Umanskyi =

Ukrainian economist and civil servant (born 1975)

Ihor Umansky
- Ігор Уманський
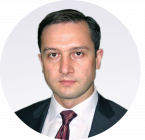

Minister of Finance
- In office 4 March 2020 – 30 March 2020
- President: Volodymyr Zelenskyy
- Prime Minister: Denys Shmyhal
- Preceded by: Oksana Markarova
- Succeeded by: Serhiy Marchenko
- In office 8 April 2009 – 11 March 2010
- President: Viktor Yushchenko
- Prime Minister: Yulia Tymoshenko
- Preceded by: Viktor Pynzenyk
- Succeeded by: Fedir Yaroshenko

Personal details
- Born: 9 January 1975 (age 51) Pripyat, Ukrainian SSR, Soviet Union (now Ukraine)
- Party: Independent
- Education: Kyiv National Economic University

Ihor Ivanovych Umansky (Ukrainian: Ігор Іванович Уманський; born 9 January 1975) is a Ukrainian economist and civil servant. On 4 March 2020, he was appointed as the Minister of Finance of Ukraine. He was dismissed on 30 March 2020. Umansky claims he never received a formal reason for his dismissal and that he first heard of it through news reports.

== Biography ==
Umanskyi was born on 9 January 1975 in the city of Pripyat, which was then part of the Ukrainian SSR in the Soviet Union. In 1997, Umansky graduated from Kyiv National Economic University. He also later became a Candidate of Economic Sciences in 2012.

After graduating in 1997, he began working within the Department of Infrastructure of Investment Activities and International Investment Cooperation for the National Agency of Ukraine for Development and European Integration. He then transferred to being an expert for the Office of the Deputy Prime Minister regarding economic issues for two years. He was then Deputy Head of the Group of Advisers to the Minister of Economy and Head of the Department of Structural Policy for the Ministry of Economy, and Deputy State Secretary for the Ministry of Economy.

In 2004, he left the ministry in order to become Director of the Department for Work with Troubled Banks with the National Bank, and then in 2005 was appointed Deputy Chairman of the Board of UkrTransNafta. Until 2008 he was also Deputy Head of the State Agency for Investments and Innovations. In 2008, he rejoined the Ministry of Finance, serving as First Deputy Minister of Finance until 2010. After his dismissal, he became a postgraduate student and senior lecturer at the Odesa National Academy of Communications.

From 2014 to 2015, he again worked as First Deputy Minister of Finance.

From 2016 to 2019, Umansky was an adviser to the President of Ukraine.

After his term as Minister of Finance, he alleged there was massive VAT fraud in Ukraine, to which a Temporary Investigative Commission of the Verkhovna Rada was launched. The commission concluded that Ukraine was losing about 2.5 billion UAH every month due to fraudulent VAT-credit scenes. He was briefly appointed as an Adviser to the Head of the Office of the President of Ukraine, Andriy Yermak, during this time, but he resigned early in November 2020 claiming that the schemes had fully resumed. He also later in 2021 alleged that a "road of construction cartel" was stealing billion from Ukraine's COVID-19 fund through manipulated road-building contracts.

== See also ==
- Second Tymoshenko government
- Shmyhal Government

Political offices
Preceded by Oksana Markarova	Minister of Finance; 2020	Succeeded by Serhiy Marchenko
