= 2010 Ukrainian government formation =

The first Azarov government was Ukraine's cabinet from March 2010 until December 2012, when the second Azarov government was appointed by president Viktor Yanukovych.

== Background ==
On March 9, 2010 the Verkhovna Rada amended its regulations to define a parliamentary coalition as an alliance of parliamentary factions and individual parliamentary deputies constituting the majority of the parliament’s constitutional composition while the Constitutional Court of Ukraine in September 2008 had defined a parliamentary coalition as an alliance of parliamentary factions that consists of at least 226 parliamentary deputies. The reason for that was a hardship of creating a coalition out of the three parliamentary factions Bloc Lytvyn, Communist Party of Ukraine, and Party of regions, combining only 219 and few members short of the necessary number. For that purpose it was decided to form a coalition with several individual members of other factions (NUNS and BYuT). This form of coalition was nicknamed "coalition of tushki" (Cyrillic: тушки, plural of тушка, "body of a small animal"). One of the leader of the Party of Regions and the head of the parliamentary procedural committee, Oleksandr Yefremov stated that party will request the Constitutional Court to elucidate the clauses of this law unless the Yulia Tymoshenko Bloc faction does it.

Ukrainian lawmakers formed a new coalition on March 11, 2010 which included Bloc Lytvyn, Communist Party of Ukraine and Party of regions. 235 deputies from the 450-member parliament had signed the coalition agreement. The same day the Our Ukraine- People's Self Defense faction officially announces that would be in opposition to the new coalition. On March 3, 2010 Bloc Yulia Tymoshenko had already moved into opposition. According to Bloc Yulia Tymoshenko the forming of the coalition was a coup d'etat.

On March 11, 2010 Bloc Yulia Tymoshenko appealed to the Central Election Commission of Ukraine to terminate the parliamentary mandates of its six parliamentarians who had joined the new parliamentary coalition.

The Verkhovna Rada appointed Mykola Azarov Prime Minister of Ukraine on March 11, 2010. At its morning plenary session the parliament adopted two declarations: to appoint Azarov as the Prime-minister and to dismiss Tymoshenko as the Prime-minister. 242 out of 343 lawmakers registered in the session hall voted for this decision. The coalition is called "Stability and Reforms".

Faction	Number of deputies	For	Against	Abstained	Didn't vote	Absent
Party of Regions Faction	172	172	0	0	0	0
Yulia Tymoshenko Bloc	155	8	3	0	56	88
Our Ukraine–People's Self-Defense Bloc	72	11	1	1	40	19
Communist Party of Ukraine Faction	27	27	0	0	0	0
Lytvyn Bloc	20	20	0	0	0	0
No faction affiliated	4	4	0	0	0	0
All factions	450	242	4	1	96	107

Following that the parliament also confirmed:

- the position of Valeriy Khoroshkovsky as the head of the Security Service of Ukraine (SBU),
- the new Cabinet of Ministers of Ukraine including one Primer, six Vice-Premiers, and 21 other ministers,
- early discontinuation of deputy duties of those who were appointed to the new cabinet.

Additional decisions

Proposals	For	Against	Abstained	Didn't vote	Total
Valeriy Khoroshkovsky as the head of the Security Service of Ukraine (SBU)	238	1	1	114	354
The composition of the Cabinet of Ministers of Ukraine	240	4	1	108	353
The appointment of M.Yezhel as the Minister of Defense and K.Hryshchenko as the Minister of Foreign Affairs	239	0	0	132	371

From coalition to majority

The parliamentary coalition was officially formed on March 16, 2010 when a list of 235 members of the coalition was published on in the official newspaper of the Ukrainian parliament, Holos Ukrayiny. The list included the Party of Regions faction in all its entirety (172 members), all 27 members of the Communist Party faction, all 20 members of the Lytvyn Bloc, six members of the faction of the Yulia Tymoshenko Bloc (BYuT), another six from the Our Ukraine-People's Self-Defense faction, and four independent deputies. Among the non-fractional parliamentary members and parliamentary defectors are politicians Oleksandr Omelchenko, Ivan Pliushch, Inna Bohoslovska, Taras Chornovil, and others.

Chairman of the Verkhovna Rada Volodymyr Lytvyn stated on April 2, 2010 that the coalition could expand to 260 members "by the middle of the next month". On April 30, 2010 he expected the coalition to grow to 252 lawmakers after May 11, 2010.

On March 30, 2010 the coalition was expanded to 238 parliamentarians, and on March 31, 2010 and April 1, 2010 to 240. On April 13, 2010 the tenth representative of BYuT joined the coalition as an independent MP, making the coalition 241 parliamentarians strong. On May 11, 2010 another five lawmakers of BYuT joined the coalition. And on May 14, 2010 another BYuT lawmakers joined the coalition. On June 1, 2010 two more BYuT members joined the coalition. The Stability and Reforms coalition now includes 249 lawmakers. On June 18, 2010 another six lawmakers of Our Ukraine-People's Self-Defense joined the coalition. On June 29, 2010 and on July 2, 2010 another two member of the Bloc of Yulia Tymoshenko faction joined the coalition, making the coalition 260 deputies strong. On July 9, 2010 the coalition included 265 MPs out of the 450 in parliament.

After the constitutional amendments of 2004 where reverted in October 2010 the parliamentary majority (instead of coalition) was announced by the chairman of the Verkhovna Rada, Volodymyr Lytvyn consisting of 227 MPs.

In February 2011 the new faction Reforms for the Future became part of the coalition.

According to ex-premier Yulia Tymoshenko (in April 2010) lawmakers had been offered a bribe of $5 million each in order to join the coalition. In June 2010 Yuriy Lutsenko and Tymoshenko claimed that opposition deputies have been offered up to 1.5 million dollars and 25,000 dollars monthly payment if they join the coalition.
