= State Treasury Service of Ukraine =

Government agency of Ukraine

Coordinates: 50.4179565°N 30.5519259°E

- Державна казначейська служба України
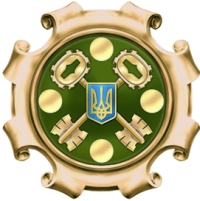

Agency overview
- Formed: 28 March 2011
- Preceding agency: State Treasury of Ukraine
- Jurisdiction: Government of Ukraine
- Headquarters: Kyiv, Ukraine
- Employees: 43
- Annual budget: ₴2,825,657,800
- Agency executive: Tetyana Sluz
- Parent agency: Ministry of Finance
- Website: www.treasury.gov.ua

The State Treasury Service of Ukraine (Ukrainian: Державна казначейська служба України, romanized: Derzhavna Kaznacheiska Sluzhba Ukrainy), formerly State Treasury of Ukraine, is a government agency under the Ministry of Finance which is the central body of the executive power of Ukraine, which implements the state policy in the field of treasury service of budget funds. It is a member of the electronic payment system of the National Bank of Ukraine. Through the Ministry of Finance, the Cabinet of ministers of Ukraine directs and coordinates the agency's operation. The Treasury of Ukraine was established to carry out state policy in the treasury service of budget funds. It is a part of the system of executive authorities.

== Tasks ==
The State Treasury of Ukraine coordinates the execution of the Ukrainian State Budget, exercises supervision over it, and administers budget monies, including foreign funding. money, as well as extrabudgetary resources. distributes general government deductions and revenues. of government budget and budgets for taxes, fees, and other necessary payments by the rules authorized by the Verkhovna Rada of Ukraine. The Autonomous Republic of Crimea, oblasts, the cities of Kyiv and Sevastopol; funds the State's expenditures; records the budget's cash execution; and creates a report on the State's and the Consolidated Budget's condition of execution. The State Treasury of Ukraine has accumulated all budgetary cash in its accounts with various banking institutions.

== History ==
The State Treasury of Ukraine was established by Presidential Decree No.335, dated 27 April 1995, as amended by Presidential Decrees Nos.70/99 and 173/99, dated 27 January 1999, and 15 February 1999, to ensure effective management of funds of the State Budget of Ukraine and increase efficiency in financing expenditures within the limits of available financial resources in the State Budget of Ukraine. The State Treasury of Ukraine was abolished by Decision No.346 of the Cabinet of Ministers of Ukraine on 28 March 2011 on the liquidation of government bodies. Therefore, the State Treasury Service of Ukraine was established as the legal successor to the rights and obligations of the State Treasury of Ukraine, a governmental body of state administration that operated in the system of the Ministry of Finance of Ukraine, and the relevant regulation was approved by the Decree of the President of Ukraine dated 13 April 2011 No.460/2011 "On the Regulation on the State Treasury Service of Ukraine."

Budget payments were significantly delayed as a result of a hacking attack on government websites which included the State Treasury of Ukraine, Pension Fund, Ministry of Finance, and others, and internal networks of state organizations on 6 December 2016. The Ministerial Cabinet of Ukraine committed 80 million hryvnias on 7 December for hacker defense. 40 million for the State Treasury and an additional 40 million for the Ministry of Finance's network equipment purchases.

== Structure ==
- First Deputy Chairman of the State Treasury of Ukraine — Volodymyr Petrovych
- Deputy Head of the State Treasury of Ukraine — Lyubov Volodymyrivna Starodubtseva
- Deputy Chairman of the State Treasury of Ukraine — Volodymyr Serhiyovych Kuznetsov
- Department of administrative and economic support
- Department of public procurement
- Department for ensuring the activities of the Chairman
- Department of network and summary budget indicators
- Department of Accounting for State Budget Operations
- Department of State Budget Expenditure
- Department of Information Technologies
- Department of consolidated financial reporting
- Department of methodology for servicing budgets, accounting and reporting
- Department of Interbudgetary Relations
- Department of service of estimates of the leading managers of funds and other clients
- Planning and financial management
- Sector of regime-secret work
- Department of budget revenues
- Department of Internal Financial Control and Audit
- Information Protection Office
- Department of state debt servicing
- Office of the organization of record keeping and control of executive discipline
- Personnel management
- Management of the payment system
- Management of financial resources
- Legal management

== Leadership ==
The former and current heads of the State Treasury Service of Ukraine are as follows:

- Tentyuk Victor Petrovych (October 1995–August 1997)
- Petrashko Petro Genadiyovych (November 1997–February 2000)
- Oleksandr Ivanovich Kireev (February 2000–June 2001)
- Petrashko Petro Genadiyovych (June 2001–May 2005)
- Oleksandr Vitaliyovych Shlapak (May 2005–August 2006)
- Sluz Tetyana Yaroslavivna (August 2006–March 2010)
- Serhii Ivanovich Kharchenko (December 2010–March 2014)
- Sluz Tetyana Yaroslavivna (since 16 April 2014)

== See also ==
- Tourism in Ukraine
