= Honored Economist of Ukraine =

Honorary title of Ukraine

Merited Economist of Ukraine Заслужений економіст України
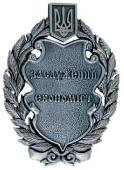
- Merited Economist of Ukraine badge

Awarded by President of Ukraine
- Type: Order of merit
- Country: Ukraine
- Eligibility: Specialists in economic specialties of enterprises, organizations, financial, banking institutions and other organizations
- Criteria: Significant contribution to the improvement of the efficiency of social production, the development of economic science and the implementation of its achievements
- Status: Currently constituted

The Honored Economist (also translated as The Merited Economist of Ukraine, Ukrainian: Заслужений економіст України) is an honorary title of Ukraine, awarded for personal merits to the Ukrainian state to citizens who worked in a relevant branch of the economy or socio-cultural sphere, as a rule, for at least ten years, have high work achievements and professional skill.

== Prerequisites ==
The honorary title is awarded to specialists in economic specialties of enterprises, organizations, financial, banking institutions and other organizations for a significant contribution to increasing the efficiency of social production, the development of economic science and the implementation of its achievements and on the occasion of the 30th anniversary of Ukraine's independence. The Law of Ukraine Regarding the State Awards of Ukraine is as follows:

- The awarding of the honorary title is carried out by decree of the President of Ukraine.
- Honorary titles can be awarded to citizens of Ukraine, foreigners and stateless persons.
- The honorary title is not awarded posthumously.
- The order of submission to the awarding of the honorary title is determined by the Decree of the President of Ukraine Regarding Honorary Titles of Ukraine.
- Persons who are nominated for the award of the honorary title must have a higher education at the specialist or master's degree.

== Procedure ==
In a setting of seriousness and widespread attention, the badge and certificate for the honorary title are presented. The President of Ukraine's proclamation granting the honorary title is announced prior to the presentation. A badge and a certificate of an honorary title of the established model are given to the recipient of an honorary title. The President of Ukraine, the Chairman of the Verkhovna Rada, the Prime Minister of Ukraine, or any person authorized by the President of Ukraine's relevant proclamation may act on his behalf to present badges and certificates for honorary titles. A protocol on the granting of badges and certificates for honorary titles must be created in accordance with the prescribed format, be signed by the recipient, and bear the organization's seal. The presentation protocol is forwarded to the Secretariat of the President of Ukraine's Office of State Awards and Heraldry.

== Description ==
Badges of honorary titles were given a standard shape and size. The emblem for the badge is shaped like an oval wreath made of two laurel leaf branches. At the bottom, tape is applied to the branch ends. A figured cartouche bearing the name of Ukraine's honorary title is inscribed in the center of the wreath. The little Ukrainian Coat of Arms is crowned with the cartouche. The breastplate's front side is convex. All graphics and text are embossed. A fastening for pinning the emblem to garments is located on the back. The breastplate measures 40 mm in height and 30 mm in breadth. Silver makes up the insignia for the honorific title.

== Notable recipients ==
- Anatolii Brezvin
- Petro Hermanchuk
- Valentyn Koronevskyk
- Oleksandr Kovalenkok
- Liudmyla Suprun
- Fedir Yaroshenko
- Ihor Yushko

== See also ==
- Merited Artist of Ukraine
- Honorary titles of Ukraine
- Economy of Ukraine

== Literature cited ==
- Ukaz Prezidenta Ukraїni: Pro vіdznachennja derzhavnimi nagorodami Ukraїni pracіvnikіv zasobіv masovoї іnformacії Указ Президента України: Про відзначення державними нагородами України працівників засобів масової інформації [Decree of the President of Ukraine: On awarding the state awards to media workers], Kyiv: Office of the President of Ukraine, 4 June 2003
- Davidenko, Boris, ed. (18 November 2014), "Abdullin Aleksandr" Абдуллин Александр [Abdullin Alexander], uk:Ligamedia (in Russian), Kyiv: uk:Група Компаній «ЛІГА»
- Ukaz №1870-X: Pro zatverdzhennja Polozhennja pro derzhavnі nagorodi Ukraїns'koї RSR Указ №1870-X: Про затвердження Положення про державні нагороди Української РСР [Decree 1870-X: On adoption of the Regulation on State Awards of the Ukrainian SSR], Kyiv: Ukrainian parliament, 7 May 1981
- Zakon Ukraїni: Pro derzhavnі nagorodi Ukraїni Закон України: Про державні нагороди України [Law of Ukraine Regarding the State Awards of Ukraine], Kyiv: Ukrainian parliament, 5 June 2017
- Ukaz Prezidenta Ukraїni: Pro pochesnі zvannja Ukraїni Указ Президента України: Про почесні звання України [President's Decree: Regarding honorary titles of Ukraine], Kyiv: Office of the President of Ukraine, 5 July 2016
- Zhaleiko, Boris (1972), Prokhorov, Aleksandr (ed.), "Zvanija pochjotnye" Звания почётные [Honorary titles], Bolshaya Sovetskaya Entsiklopediya Большая советская энциклопедия [Great Soviet Encyclopedia], vol. 9 (3rd ed.), Moscow: Советская энциклопедия, LCCN 71485835, OCLC 810278
- Stolbetsov, Oleg (20 July 2018), "V Rossii uchrezhdeno zvanie "Zasluzhennyj zhurnalist"" В России учреждено звание «Заслуженный журналист» [The title of Merited Journalist established in Russia], kursktv.ru, Kursk: Alekhin and Co
- Buzalo, Viktor (2011), "Pochesnі zvannja Ukraїni" Почесні звання України [Honorary titles of Ukraine], Enciklopedіja іstorії Ukraїni Енциклопедія історії України [Encyclopedia of Ukrainian History], vol. 8, Kyiv: Naukova Dumka, pp. 472–473, ISBN 9789660011427, OCLC 1110099116
- Ukaz Prezidenta Ukraїni: Pro vіdznachennja derzhavnimi nagorodami Ukraїni Указ Президента України: Про відзначення державними нагородами України [Decree of the President of Ukraine: On the awarding of state awards], Kyiv: Office of the President of Ukraine, 15 August 2012
- "Bezljudnaja Anna Vital'evna" Безлюдная Анна Витальевна [Bezlyudnaya Anna Vitalievna], uk:UBR (in Russian), Kyiv: Мультимедіа-інвест Груп, 25 November 2019
- Ukaz Prezidenta Ukraїni: Pro vіdznachennja derzhavnimi nagorodami Ukraїni z nagodi Dnja Konstitucії Ukraїni Указ Президента України: Про відзначення державними нагородами України з нагоди Дня Конституції України [President's Decree: On awarding the state awards of Ukraine on the occasion of the Constitution Day of Ukraine], Kyiv: Office of the President of Ukraine, 27 June 2015
