= Viktor Pynzenyk =

Ukrainian politician and economist (born 1954)

- Віктор Пинзеник
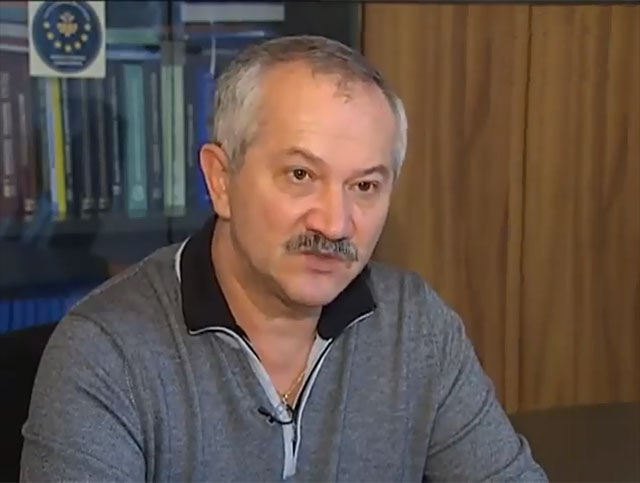
- Pynzenyk in 2013

Minister of Finance of Ukraine
- In office 18 December 2007 – 17 February 2009
- Preceded by: Mykola Azarov
- Succeeded by: Ihor Umansky (Acting)
- In office 4 February 2005 – 28 September 2005; 28 September 2005 – August 2006
- Preceded by: Mykola Azarov
- Succeeded by: Mykola Azarov

5th First Vice Prime Minister of Ukraine
- In office 31 October 1994 – 5 September 1995
- Preceded by: Yevhen Marchuk
- Succeeded by: Pavlo Lazarenko

Vice Prime Minister of Ukraine
- In office 3 August 1995 – 21 September 1996; 21 September 1996 – 7 April 1997

Personal details
- Born: 15 April 1954 (age 72) Smolohovytsia, Ukrainian SSR, Soviet Union
- Party: Independent (since 2010, before 2002)
- Other political affiliations: Reforms and Order Party (1997–2010)
- Spouse: Maria Romanivna (1969)
- Children: Olga (1981), Yulia (1989), and Volodymyr (1993)
- Occupation: Politician, economist and professor

Viktor Mykhailovych Pynzenyk (Ukrainian: Віктор Михайлович Пинзеник; born 15 April 1954) is a Ukrainian politician, economist, and former Minister of Finance. He is the former leader of the Reforms and Order Party.

Pynzenyk has been credited with economic reform in post-Soviet Ukraine, helping to transform the country into a market economy and introducing Ukraine's new currency, the hryvnia in September 1996, with the help of Viktor Yushchenko, at the time Chairman of the National Bank of Ukraine.

== Early life ==
Viktor Pynzenyk was born on 15 April 1954, in Smolohovytsia, in the westernmost Zakarpattia Oblast (province) of the Ukrainian SSR (now Ukraine) to Mykhailo and Mariya Pynzenyk. After completing his secondary education, Pynzenyk studied at the Lviv State University, from which he graduated in 1975 as an economist. He stayed on in the same university until 1979 for the post-graduate work on his dissertation in Economics which he defended in 1980 receiving the degree of Candidate of Science (roughly Ph.D. equivalent). He continued his scientific work in the Moscow State University where he received his Doktor of Science degree in 1989. A year later, Pynzenyk became a professor of economics at his alma mater—the Lviv University.

In 1996, he received an honorary doctorate from the National University of Kyiv-Mohyla Academy.

== Political and economic career ==
Pynzenyk was sworn into Ukrainian parliament on 4 January 1992, and soon afterwards became a member of the economic reforms working group. Later that year, he became the Vice-Prime Minister of Ukraine as well as the Minister of Economy. As minister, Pynzenyk introduced the first economic reforms in the newly independent Ukraine, helping transform the country into a market economy.

In March 1992, Pynzenyk was elected to the second convocation of the parliament as part of the "Reforms" faction, serving his mandate until April 1998. As an MP, he participated in the finance and banking work group. From 31 October 1994 until 5 September 1995, he served as the country's First Vice Prime Minister of Ukraine, and from 3 August 1995 to 7 April 1997—as the Vice Prime Minister of Ukraine.

Viktor was elected to Verkhovna Rada for the third time in the 1998 Ukrainian parliamentary election serving from March 1998 until the next election in 2002. In 2002, Pynzenyk was elected as part of the "Our Ukraine" electoral bloc. Three years later, after the Orange Revolution, Pynzenyk was chosen as the Minister of Economy on 4 February 2005, and served his post until August 2006. Then on 3 November 2007, he became a deputy of the Verkhovna Rada of the sixth convocation as a member of the Reforms and Order Party, which participated in the elections as part of the Yulia Tymoshenko Bloc.

Viktor Pynzenyk served as the Minister of Finance of Ukraine in the Prime Minister Yulia Tymoshenko's Cabinet, elected on 18 December 2007. He offered his resignation on 12 February 2008 because he could not abandon the principles of a balanced budget with a minimum deficit, realistic revenue sources and limits on government borrowing. The Ukrainian Parliament still has to support this resignation. Tymoshenko's reaction to his resignation was: "Not all officials can withstand the challenges of a global economic crisis, not all of them can work under pressure, and respond adequately to challenges. The weakest leave their combat posts and turn to other activities", Tymoshenko also stated: "He was in hospital and was not working for health reasons". President Viktor Yushchenko's reaction to Pynzenyk's resignation was of a different nature: "It is a pity that such people – professional, honest and devoted to state interests are unable to realize their potential being members of the Government, losing such voice is a great misunderstanding and unprofessional policy of the Government. I am assured that the whole range of negative processes in budgetary policy will follow". Pynzenyk, in conversation with United States Ambassador to Ukraine John F. Tefft at a meeting on 22 February 2010 showed "frustration at his inability to convince Tymosehnko to take advantage of the opportunity presented by the 2008–2009 Ukrainian financial crisis to reform" (according to Tefft) and called Tymoshenko's decisions "normally guided by ‘adventurous populism,’" which she saw as a tool to "consolidate power in her own hands."

On 17 February 2009, the Verkhovna Rada officially dismissed Pynzenyk. Pynzenyk was absent from the voting as he was in hospital.

Pynzenyk withdrew from the Reforms and Order Party in April 2010.

Pynzenyk was appointed deputy chairman of the supervisory council of UkrSibbank in February 2011.

Pynzenyk returned to national politics as number 7 on the party list of UDAR of Vitaliy Klychko for the 2012 Ukrainian parliamentary election. He was (re-)elected into parliament.

In the 2014 Ukrainian parliamentary election he was again re-elected into parliament; this time after placing 17th on the electoral list of Petro Poroshenko Bloc.

== Personal life ==
Despite his career in politics, Viktor Pynzenyk remains a professor at the Lviv University. He has been named an honorary professor of the Kyiv-Mohyla Academy, and the Economics Institute of Ternopil. Additionally, he has been named an "Honored Economist of Ukraine" (as of 2004).

Viktor Pynzenyk is married to Mariya Romanivna (b. 1969), and they have two children: sons Volodymyr (b. 1993) and Vitaliy (b. 2007). He also has two daughters from the previous marriage Olga (b. 1981) and Yulia (b. 1989). Pynzenyk's hobbies include tourism, an interest in music, as well as playing the preferans game. His income declaration for 2006 constituted 265,200 hryvnias ($53,000). He drives a Toyota RAV4 and a Toyota 4Runner.

== See also ==
- Ukrainian Christian Democratic Party

== References and footnotes ==
Political offices
| Preceded by Mykola Azarov | Minister of Finance of Ukraine; 2007–2009 | Succeeded by Ihor Umansky (Acting) |
| Preceded by Yevhen Marchuk | First Vice Prime Minister of Ukraine; 1994–1995 | Succeeded by Pavlo Lazarenko |
Party political offices
| Preceded by None | Leader of the Reforms and Order Party; 1997–2010 | Succeeded by Serhiy Sobolev |
