= Team of Winter Generation =

Team of Winter Generation Команда озимого покоління
- Leader: Valeriy Khoroshkovskyi
- Founded: 2002
- International affiliation: None
- Colours: Green / Yellow

Website
- www.zbirna.org.ua (archived)

The Team of Winter Generation (Ukrainian: Команда озимого покоління, romanized: Komanda ozymoho pokolinnya) was an electoral alliance in Ukraine. At the parliamentary elections on 30 March 2002, the alliance won 2.0% of the popular vote and no seats.

The alliance had the following members:

- Constitutional Democratic Party (Konstitucijno-Demokratyčna Partija)
- Liberal Democratic Party of Ukraine (Liberal'no Demokratuyčna Partija Ukrajiny)
- Party of Private Property (Partija Privatnoi Vlasnosti)
- Ukrainian Peasant Democratic Party (Ukrajins'ka Selkans'ka Demokratyčna Partija)

Team of Winter Generation strongly resembled the successful 1999 electoral campaign of the Russian Union of Right Forces. The total expenditure of the campaign was estimated at $15 million. The party focused on creating a liberal, youthful image. Non-members could win a place on the party list by winning a TV-show on ICTV. The party score was not better in its target group then in other age groups.

== Top 10 members ==
- Valeriy Khoroshkovsky, member of parliament, unaffiliated
- Inna Bohoslovska, member of parliament, Constitutional Democratic Party
- Mykola Sytnyk (Veresen), unemployed, unaffiliated
- Ostap Protsyk, director of Agency for the European integration, unaffiliated
- Valeriy Voshchevsky, leader of Ukrainian Peasant Democratic Party
- Iryna Horina, commerce director of "Faktor-5", Liberal Democratic Party of Ukraine
- Vadym Hurzhos, chairman of supervising council for "Galakton", Party of Private Property
- Lev Khlyavych, deputy chairman of "Ukrinmedstrakh", Liberal Democratic Party of Ukraine
- Bohdan Shevchuk, general director (acting) of Agro-Industrial Complex "Pivdennyi", unaffiliated
- Yevhen Podosyonov, vice-president of LAZ, unaffiliated
