= Ministry of Finance (Ukraine) =

Government ministry of Ukraine

Ministry of Finance of Ukraine
- Міністерство фінансів України

Agency overview
- Jurisdiction: Government of Ukraine
- Headquarters: 12/2 Mykhailo Hrushevsky Street, Kyiv
- Minister responsible: Serhiy Marchenko, Minister of Finance of Ukraine
- Child agencies: State Treasury Service; State Customs Service; State Tax Service; State Service for Financial Monitoring
- Website: minfin.gov.ua

The Ministry of Finance of Ukraine (Ukrainian: Міністерство фінансів України) is the ministry of the Government of Ukraine charged with developing and implementing national financial and budget policies, and with defining national policies in customs and taxation. The ministry is responsible for ensuring that the state has enough resources to perform its functions and that financial policies promote economic growth. As of 2026Serhiy Marchenko is the Minister of Finance of Ukraine.

== Role ==
Specific responsibilities of the ministry include:

- regulating customs fees and tax collection;
- regulating administration of Ukraine's single social insurance tax;
- defining state policy for combating violations of tax and customs law;
- defining state policy for combating proceeds from crime and financing of terrorism; cooperating with the inter-governmental Financial Action Task Force (FATF) and other anti–money laundering international organisations;
- regulating issues related to financial control of public funds; monitoring compliance with accounting standards; administering lotteries; regulating securities issuances and certain precious metals and gemstone transactions;
- analysing and forecasting public revenue, drafting mid-term Budget Declarations and annual Budget Laws;
- coordinating implementation of the State Budget;
- setting guidelines for budget planning; enhancing effectiveness of public financial management;
- managing public and state-guaranteed debt;
- regulating intergovernmental fiscal relations; approving within-country regional borrowing and provision of debt guarantees by local governments;
- informing the general public about economic and fiscal policies of the state, as well as the results of implementing the state's budget;
- assessing financial viability of regional development projects;
- development and management of state-owned banks;
- defining and implementing national policy on development of financial services and non-bank financial institutions (e.g. insurers);
- cooperating with the International Monetary Fund and other international financial organisations.

== Senior leadership ==
Incumbent	Position	Portfolio
Serhiy Marchenko	Minister of Finance	Management of the Ministry
Denys Uliutin	First Deputy Minister of Finance	Inter-budgetary relations (state and local budgets), financing of security and defense, procuratorial authorities and separate law enforcement, implementation of national programs of Ukraine-NATO cooperation
Yuriy Butsa	State Commissioner for public debt management	Commercial borrowing, EU macro-fiscal support and World Bank guaranteed loans
Alexander Kava	Deputy Minister of Finance	Financing of infrastructure projects
Roman Yermolychev	Deputy Minister of Finance	Expenditures of the budget of the humanitarian sphere, expenditures of the social sphere and authorities
Svitlana Vorobei	Deputy Minister of Finance	Ensuring the activities of the Ministry in the field of tax and customs policy, verification of government payments
Olga Zykova	Deputy Minister of Finance	Development and implementation of unified state financial policy in the field of cooperation with foreign governments, foreign financial institutions, and international financial organizations.
Yuriy Draganchuk	Deputy minister of finance of Ukraine for European integration	Financial and customs policies, international cooperation and strategic planning in European integration, fuel and energy complex finance, property relations
Oleksandr Hrubiian	Deputy Minister of Finance of Ukraine for Digital Development, Digital Transformations and Digitalization	Development of digital transformations and digitalization
Dmytro Samonenko	State Secretary	Organisational development, HR management, information systems and technologies, administrative management

== Ministry agencies ==
There are several central executive agencies in Ukraine which report to the Cabinet of Ministers through the Minister of Finance. These include:

1. State Treasury Service;
2. State Tax Service;
3. State Customs Service;
4. State Financial Monitoring Service of Ukraine;
5. State Audit Service of Ukraine.

Note: Prior to 10 September 2014, the list of executive agencies under the Ministry of Finance also included the State Assay Service. This agency was closed down as part of the Government's initiative to streamline the structure of executive agencies. Functions in assay control were split between the Ministry of Finance (implementing state assay control policy) and the State Service for Food Safety and Consumer Protection (protecting the rights of consumers of precious metals and gems).

== Supporting establishments ==
- State gemological center of Ukraine
- State repository of precious metals and stones
- Museum of decorative and precious stones
- Kyiv Offset Factory
- Main planning and service center of computer financial technologies
- Administration in exploitation of assets complex
- Recreation site Koncha-Zaspa
- Administration Office in International Financial Cooperation projects
- Assay Control State Offices (Dnipro, Donetsk, Western, Crimean, Southern, Eastern, Central)
- Scientific-researching financial institute

The Ukrainian Startup Fund was established in 2018 by the Cabinet of Ministers on the initiative of the Minister of Finance of Ukraine. From 2023, it has been managed by the Ministry of Digital Transformation.

== List of ministers of finance of Ukraine ==
Name of parent agency	Name of minister	Term of office	
Name of parent agency	Name of minister	Start	End
General Secretariat of Ukraine	Khrystofor Baranovsky	June 15, 1917	January 30, 1918
Council of People's Ministers	Stepan Perepelytsya	January 30, 1918	February 1918
Council of People's Ministers	Petro Klymovych	February 1918	April 29, 1918
Council of Ministers (1918)	Anton Rzhepitskiy	April 30, 1918	December 14, 1918
Council of People's Ministers	Vasyl Mazurenko	December 26, 1918	January 1919
Council of People's Ministers	Borys Martos	January 1919	February 13, 1919
Council of People's Ministers	Mykhailo Kryvetsky	February 13, 1919	April 9, 1919
Council of People's Ministers	Borys Martos	April 9, 1919	May 25, 1920
Council of People's Ministers	Khrystofor Baranovsky	May 28, 1920	November 21, 1920
People's Secretariat	Stanislav Kosior	March 1918	April 1918
People's Secretariat	Joachim Vatsetis	1918	September 1918
People's Secretariat	Mikhail Bogolyepov	November 28, 1918	1918
Temporary Government of Peasants and Workers	Fridrikh Zemit	1918	1919
Council of People's Commissars	Yuda Novakovskyi	1919	1919
Council of People's Commissars	Mykola Lytvynenko	1919	1923
Council of People's Commissars	Stepan Kuznyetsov	1923	1925
Council of People's Commissars	Mykhailo Poloz	1925	1931
Council of People's Commissars	Ksenofont Koval	1931	1932
Council of People's Commissars	Oleksandr Rekis	1932	1937
Council of People's Commissars	Marko Vasylenko	1937	1937
Council of People's Commissars	Mykola Kurach	1937	1944
Council of People's Commissars	Heorhiy Sakhnovsky	1944	1946
Cabinet of Ministers of Ukrainian SSR	Heorhiy Sakhnovsky	1946	1951
Cabinet of Ministers of Ukrainian SSR	Mykola Shchetinin	1951	1961
Cabinet of Ministers of Ukrainian SSR	Anatoliy Baranovsky	1961	August 22, 1979
Cabinet of Ministers of Ukrainian SSR	Vasyl Kozeruk	August 22, 1979	March 6, 1987
Cabinet of Ministers of Ukrainian SSR	Ivan Zabrodin	March 6, 1987	1990
Cabinet of Ministers of Ukrainian SSR	Ivan Zaichuk	1990	1990
Cabinet of Ministers of Ukrainian SSR	Oleksandr Kovalenko	August 2, 1990	August 24, 1990
Cabinet of Ministers of Ukraine	Oleksandr Kovalenko	August 24, 1990	October 29, 1991
Cabinet of Ministers of Ukraine	Hryhoriy Piatachenko	October 29, 1991	July 6, 1994
Cabinet of Ministers of Ukraine	Petro Hermanchuk	July 6, 1994	June 18, 1996
Cabinet of Ministers of Ukraine	Valentyn Koronevsky	June 18, 1996	February 25, 1997
Cabinet of Ministers of Ukraine	Ihor Mityukov	February 26, 1997	December 27, 2001
Cabinet of Ministers of Ukraine	Ihor Yushko	December 27, 2001	November 26, 2002
Cabinet of Ministers of Ukraine	Mykola Azarov	November 26, 2002	February 3, 2005
Cabinet of Ministers of Ukraine	Viktor Pynzenyk	February 4, 2005	August 4, 2006
Cabinet of Ministers of Ukraine	Mykola Azarov	August 4, 2006	December 18, 2007
Cabinet of Ministers of Ukraine	Viktor Pynzenyk	December 18, 2007	February 17, 2009
Cabinet of Ministers of Ukraine	Ihor Umansky (acting)	April 8, 2009	March 11, 2010
Cabinet of Ministers of Ukraine	Fedir Yaroshenko	March 11, 2010	January 18, 2012
Cabinet of Ministers of Ukraine	Valeriy Khoroshkovsky	January 18, 2012	February 22, 2012
Cabinet of Ministers of Ukraine	Yuriy Kolobov	February 28, 2012	27 February 2014
Cabinet of Ministers of Ukraine	Oleksandr Shlapak	27 February 2014	2 December 2014
Cabinet of Ministers of Ukraine	Natalie Jaresko	2 December 2014	14 April 2016
Cabinet of Ministers of Ukraine	Oleksandr Danylyuk	14 April 2016	7 June 2018
Cabinet of Ministers of Ukraine	Oksana Markarova	22 November 2018	4 March 2020
Cabinet of Ministers of Ukraine	Ihor Umansky	4 March 2020	30 March 2020
Cabinet of Ministers of Ukraine	Serhiy Marchenko	30 March 2020	Incumbent

== See also ==
- National Bank of Ukraine
