= State Audit Service of Ukraine =

- Державна аудиторська служба України
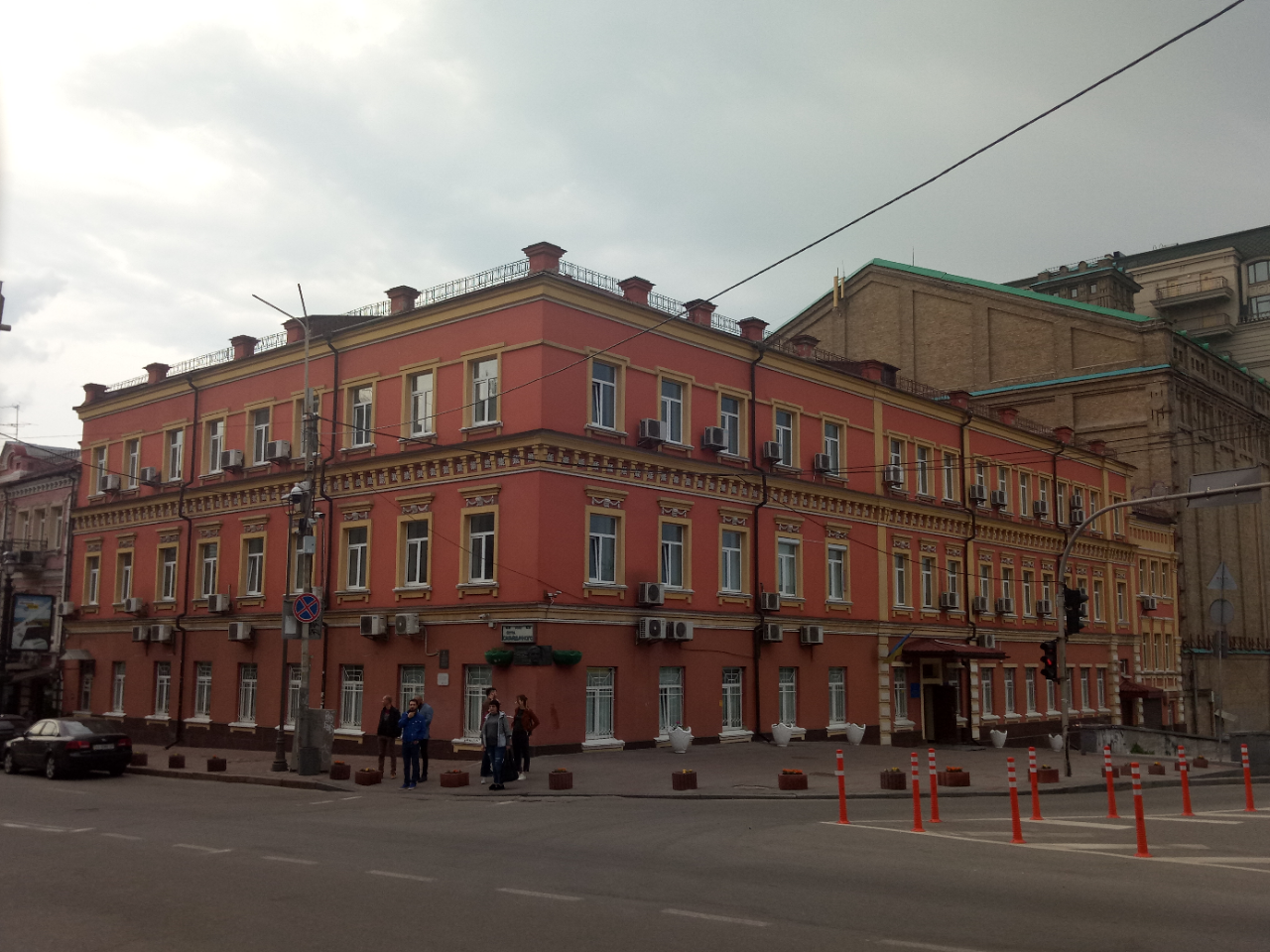
- SAS

Agency overview
- Formed: October 28, 2015
- Jurisdiction: Ukraine Ministry of Finance (Ukraine)
- Headquarters: 4 Sahaydachnogo str., Kyiv, Ukraine, 04070
- Employees: all – 2708, head office – 594
- Annual budget: ₴664.94 million (2019), ₴562 million (2020)
- Agency executive: Alla Basalaeva, Chairman of the SAS
- Parent agency: Government of Ukraine
- Child agencies: Northern office of the SAS; North-Eastern office of the SAS; Southern office of the SAS; Western office of the SAS; Eastern office of the SAS
- Website: https://www.dasu.gov.ua/en

The State Audit Service of Ukraine (SAS) is central executive authority, the activity of which is directed and coordinated by the Cabinet of Ministers of Ukraine through the Minister of Finance of Ukraine and which implements the state policy in the sphere of the public financial control.

== General Information, Composition and Appointment ==
The SAS bodies include the SAS and its interregional territorial bodies: the Northern office of the SAS (Kyiv), the North-Eastern office of the SAS (Kharkiv), the Southern office of the SAS (Odesa), the Western office of the SAS (Lviv), the Eastern office of the SAS (Dnipro).

The SAS and its interregional territorial bodies are legal persons of the public law; they have seals with the image of the State Emblem of Ukraine and with its name, its own letterheads and accounts at the authorities of the State Treasury Service of Ukraine.

The legal acts that are regulated the SAS bodies activity are the Budget Code of Ukraine, the Law of Ukraine of 26 January 1993 No 2939-XII “On the Main Principles of Carrying out the Public Financial Control in Ukraine” the Decree of the Cabinet of Ministers of Ukraine of 3 February 2016 No 43 “On Approving of the Procedure of the State Audit Service of Ukraine”, etc.

== History ==
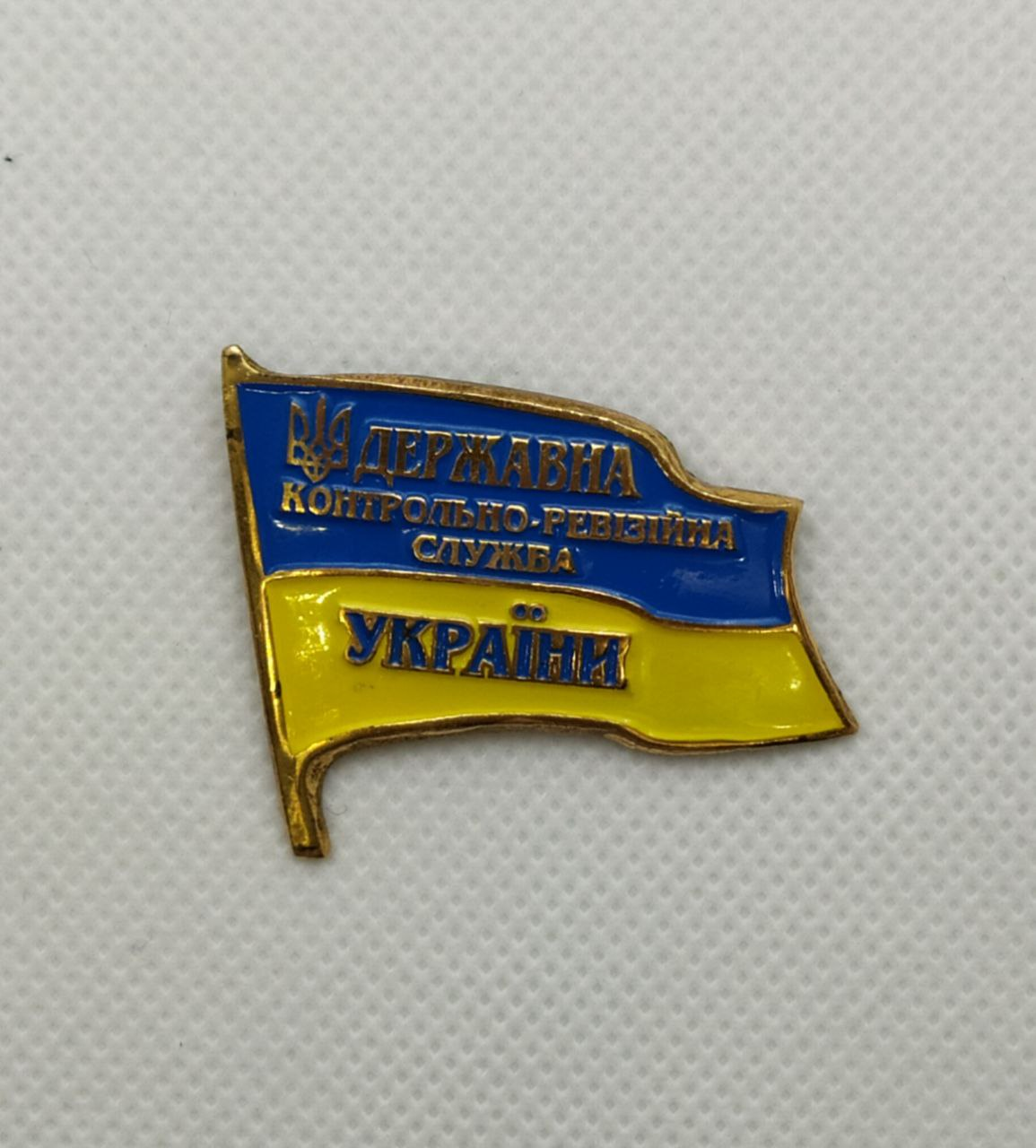
DKRS icon

As a part of the Russian Empire, Ukraine had not its own bodies of financial control. Control functions throughout Russia were carried out in accordance with the Regulation On Local Controlling Institutions at the Empire from 3 January 1866 the Office of Public Control, which worked at the Ministry of Finance. In such a way this body of financial control existed till 1919.

The leaders of the young Ukrainian state are very aware of the important role of the control functions of the Ministry of Finance, the Treasury and banks. Therefore, during the Directory, a special unit of the State Controller with extraordinary powers and authority was established.

From that time till 1937 the bodies of financial control was reorganized, but functions of financial control did not change. From 1937 to 1956 the Control and Revision Office of the National Commissariat carried out the financial control in Ukraine, later the Ministry of Finance of the USSR carried out it. In 1956 the Control and Revision Office was created as a part of the Ministry of Finance of Ukraine.

After independence of Ukraine the role of the public financial control increased, and in 1993 the Law of Ukraine “On State Control and Revision Service of Ukraine”.

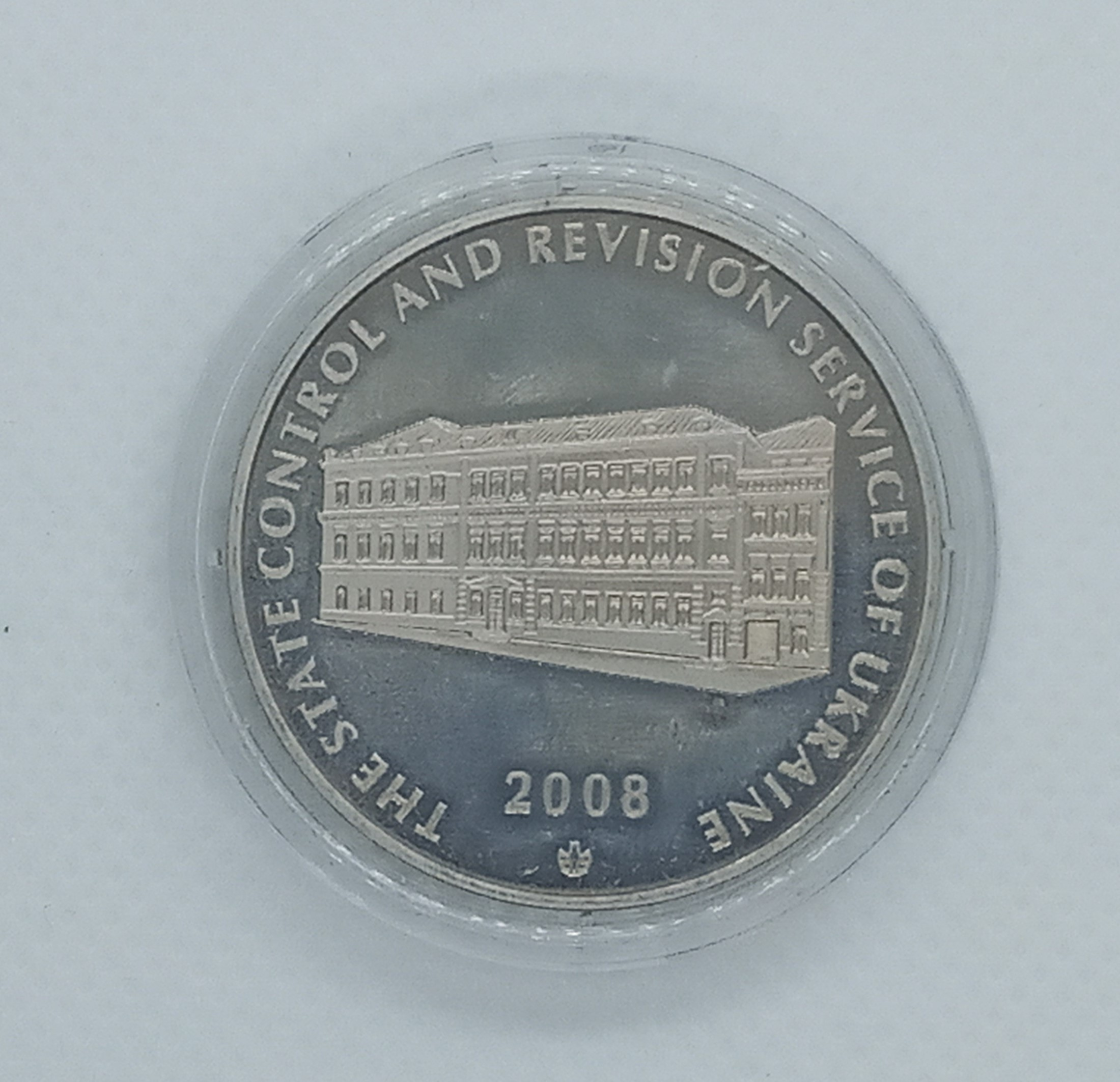
DKRS medal

The Order of the President of Ukraine of 27 August 2000 No 1031 “On measures to improve the efficiency of control and revision work the Main Control and Revision Office of Ukraine” was given the status of a central executive body.

According to the Order of the President of Ukraine of 9 December 2010 No 1085/2010 “On optimization of central executive bodies the Main Control and Revision Office of Ukraine” was reorganized into the State Financial Inspection of Ukraine (the DFI).

According to the Decree of the Cabinet of the Ministers of Ukraine of 28 October 2015 No 868 “On establishment of the State Audit Service of Ukraine” the DFI was reorganized into the State Audit Service of Ukraine.

In 2020, the reform of the State Audit Service of Ukraine into an office began, but it was not completed.

== Management ==
Chairman of the State Audit Service of Ukraine - Alla Basalaeva

Deputy Chairman of the State Audit Service of Ukraine - Oleksandr SHKUROPAТ
Deputy Chairman of the State Audit Service of Ukraine -Yuliia SOLIANIК
Deputy Chairman of the State Audit Service of Ukraine for Digital Development, Digital Transformation and Digitalization - Dmytro Shevchuk

== Main tasks of the SAS ==
The main tasks of the SAS are:

1) implementation of the state policy in the sphere of the public financial control;
2) carrying out of the public financial control which is aimed at the assessment of effective, legal, targeted, resulted use and conservation of public financial resources, fixed other assets, achieving the economy of the budget assets;
3) administrative services provision in cases established by law.

== Measures of state financial control ==
According to the Law of Ukraine “On State Control and Revision Service of Ukraine” SAS carries out the public financial control through performance of:

- the public financial audit,
- the checks of public procurements;
- the inspections (the revisions);
- the monitoring of the procurements

=== Public financial audit ===
A public financial audit shall be a type of public financial control. It shall consist in examination and analysis of the actual state of affairs concerning legal and efficient use of public or municipal funds and property, other assets, accounting accuracy and financial reporting credibility, internal control system operation. It shall be carried out by the body of the public financial control. Results of public financial audits and their assessment shall be formulized in a report.

=== Checks of public procurements ===
The procurement check at the contracting authorities is conducted at the location of a controlled legal entity or at the location of the ownership item which is checked and constitutes the documentary and factual analysis of compliance with the procurement legislation by the contracting authority. Procurement check's results shall be recorded in the Act.

=== Inspection ===
Inspection shall be carried out by the body of the state financial control in a form of revision and shall consist in documentary and factual examination of a certain set or separate issues concerning financial and economic activity of a controlled institution. It shall ensure detection of any facts of violation of law and ascertainment of officials or materially liable persons guilty of having committed them. Results of revision shall be formulized in an act.

The main document regulating this measure of state financial control is the Procedure for Inspection by the State Audit Service of Ukraine and its Interregional Territorial Bodies by the Resolution of the Cabinet of Ministers of Ukraine No. 550 of April 20, 2006.

=== Monitoring of the procurements ===
According to the Law of Ukraine "On Public Procurement" monitoring of the procurement - analysis of customer compliance with public procurement legislation at all stages of procurement in order to prevent violations of public procurement legislation.
