= Valeriy Khoroshkovskyi =

Ukrainian businessman and politician (born 1969)

- Валерій Хорошковський
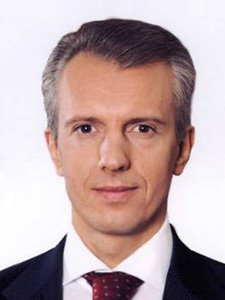
- Khoroshkovskyi in 2012

First Deputy Prime Minister of Ukraine
- In office 22 February 2012 – 14 December 2012
- President: Viktor Yanukovych
- Prime Minister: Mykola Azarov
- Preceded by: Andriy Klyuyev
- Succeeded by: Serhiy Arbuzov

Minister of Finance of Ukraine
- In office 18 January 2012 – 22 February 2012
- President: Viktor Yanukovych
- Prime Minister: Mykola Azarov
- Preceded by: Fedir Yaroshenko
- Succeeded by: Yuriy Kolobov

Head of the Security Service of Ukraine
- In office 11 March 2010 – 18 January 2012
- President: Viktor Yushchenko; Viktor Yanukovych
- Prime Minister: Yulia Tymoshenko; Mykola Azarov
- Preceded by: Valentyn Nalyvaichenko
- Succeeded by: Ihor Kalinin

Head of the State Customs Service of Ukraine
- In office 24 December 2007 – 28 January 2009
- President: Viktor Yushchenko
- Prime Minister: Yulia Tymoshenko

Ministry of Economy and European Integration
- In office December 2002 – January 2004
- President: Leonid Kuchma
- Prime Minister: Viktor Yanukovych
- Preceded by: Oleksandr Shlapak
- Succeeded by: Mykola Derkach

People's Deputy of Ukraine
- In office 29 March 1998 – 31 March 2002

Personal details
- Born: 1 January 1969 (age 57) Kyiv, Ukrainian SSR, Soviet Union (now Ukraine)
- Party: Party of Regions
- Other political affiliations: People's Democratic Party (1998–2002); Ukrainian Peasant Democratic Party (2002); Labour Ukraine (2002); Strong Ukraine (2014)
- Spouse: Olena
- Children: Two sons, one daughter
- Education: Kyiv State University

Valeriy Ivanovych Khoroshkovskyi (Ukrainian: Валерій Іванович Хорошковський; born 1 January 1969) is a Ukrainian businessman and politician who served as head of the Security Service of Ukraine from 2010 to 2012 and as Minister of Finance and First Deputy Prime Minister of Ukraine briefly in 2012. According to Ukrainian and East European media Khoroshkovskyi is one of Ukraine's richest people.

While being in public office Khoroshkovskyi had large stakes in various Ukrainian media and metallurgy industries. In 2006 Khoroshkovskyi stated: "I owned mid-sized businesses that had no kind of political influence. I cannot say I gained something for my business thanks to politics or that I had any political advantages thanks to business".

== Early life and career ==
Valeriy Khoroshkovskyi was born on 1 January 1969 in the Ukrainian capital of Kyiv, then part of the Soviet Union. Khoroshkovskyi completed a postgraduate economics study at Taras Shevchenko Kyiv State University in 1993.

== Business career ==
In 1994, Khoroshkovskyi started a metal trading business in partnership with Vadym Gurzhos which he disbanded in 1995 to become active in banking. Since then Khoroshkovskyi has been active in the furniture retail and trading business and has had stakes in dairy, soda, machinery and bus factories. In 2004 Khoroshkovskyi sold his stake in Ukrsotsbank to Ukraine's second-richest businessman Viktor Pinchuk for an estimated $200 million.

After Khoroshkovsky's resignation as Economics Minister in January 2004 he was appointed vice president of steel giant Evraz, becoming its head in April 2006 either because of his connections or his 13-year friendship with Alexander Abramov. In December 2006 Khoroshkovskyi resigned as chief executive officer of Evraz because of his appointment as the First Deputy Secretary of the National Security and Defense Council of Ukraine.

In 2005, Khoroshkovskyi paid about $250 million for a 61% stake in Inter TV, one of Ukraine's biggest television channels. In June 2007 he expanded his U.A. Inter Media Group Ltd with various other channels bought from Dmytro Firtash. After Khoroshkovskyi was appointed as Head of the State Customs Service of Ukraine in December 2007 his wife became head of U.A. Inter Media Group.

In June 2010, both Kanal 5 and TVi accused Khoroshkovskyi of abusing his power and influence to preserve monopoly control of Ukraine's media airwaves and limit objective news reporting. Khoroshkovskyi replied (early June 2010) that he was ready to sell his media business to a willing buyer.

Khoroshkovskyi sold 100% of Inter Media Group Limited (back) to Firtash on 1 February 2013.

== Political career ==
Khoroshkovskyi was a member of the Verkhovna Rada (Ukrainian parliament) from 1998 until 2002 after winning a seat in the Krasnoperekopsk constituency, representing the People's Democratic Party. As a lawmaker he voted for the removal of Prime Minister Viktor Yushchenko from his office in May 2001 which resulted in the end of Yushchenko's prime ministership.

During the 2002 Ukrainian parliamentary election Khoroshkovskyi represented the Team of Winter Generation, which won no seats; he was a member of the Ukrainian Peasant Democratic Party at the time.

In August 2002, Khoroshkovskyi was appointed deputy head in the Presidential Administration of President Leonid Kuchma. Khoroshkovskyi was appointed minister of economy in December 2002 in the new Viktor Yanukovych government on recommendation of Labour Ukraine. In 2003 he criticized Ukraine's economic policy and threatened to resign if Ukraine entered the common economic space with Russia, Belarus and Kazakhstan. Labour Ukraine immediately warned the minister that any minister who opposed the entry of Ukraine to this common economic space would be fired from the government. Khoroshkovskyi resigned in January 2004, complaining that the Finance Ministry was preventing his Economic Ministry from drawing up long-term economic plans.

In December 2006, President Viktor Yushchenko appointed Khoroshkovskyi as First Deputy Secretary of the National Security and Defense Council, from which Khoroshkovskyi resigned in May 2007. On 24 December 2007 Khoroshkovskyi was appointed as Head of the State Customs Service of Ukraine. He was relieved of this post on 28 January 2009. The same day, Khoroshkovskyi was appointed First Deputy Chief of the Security Service of Ukraine (SBU). On 11 March 2010 Khoroshkovskyi was appointed head of the SBU by the Verkhovna Rada. On 19 April 2010 Khoroshkovskyi was appointed a staff member of the National Bank of Ukraine by President Viktor Yanukovych. In 2010 he was also member of the Higher Council of Justice, that appoints and fires judges, from 31 May to 16 December.

The SBU opened its Soviet Ukrainian archives in January 2009. Khoroshkovskyi believes that the SBU should reduce public access to its archives and concentrate on its main task of being a secret service.

According to Member of the European Parliament Elmar Brok (who met Khoroshkovskyi when Khoroshkovskyi hosted a luxurious dinner for MEPs in Brussels in November 2010) "he doesn't seem to understand that threatening the independence of the judiciary is one of biggest mistakes you can make when you are trying to build a new state, he doesn't seem to understand what are the proper limits of his mandate."

President Yanukovych conferred a rank of general to Khoroshkovskyi in August 2011.

When Minister of Finance Fedir Yaroshenko resigned on 18 January 2012 he was replaced by Khoroshkovskyi as the new Minister of Finance the same day; Khoroshkovskyi was then dismissed as head of the Security Service of Ukraine. After Andriy Klyuyev had left the post mid-February 2012 Khoroshkovskyi was tipped as the new First Vice Prime Minister of Ukraine. On 22 February 2012 he was appointed First Vice Prime Minister and dismissed as finance minister. Relations with the European Union is among his responsibilities. He speaks good English.

In a 2012 interview to Deutsche Welle, Khoroshkovskyi claimed that Viktor Yanukovych was not being allowed to the European Union due to selective justice.

Khoroshkovskyi resigned from the interim Azarov Government on 14 December 2012 (the day after the re-appointment of Prime Minister Mykola Azarov) because he "considered Azarov incapable of carrying out economic reforms and defending our country's strategic course for European integration".

In the 2014 Ukrainian parliamentary election Khoroshkovskyi tried to return to national politics when he was second on the party list of Strong Ukraine (after party leader Serhiy Tihipko). But in the election the party failed to clear the 5% election threshold (it got 3.11% of the votes) and thus Khoroshkovskyi was not elected into parliament.
