= Ukrainian Peasant Democratic Party =

Ukrainian Peasant Democratic Party Українська селянська демократична партія
- Leader: Dmytro Yosypovych Andriyevskyi
- Founded: January 1991
- Dissolved: December 2011
- Merged into: United Left and Peasants
- Headquarters: Kyiv
- Colours: white

Website
- www.useldp.org

The Ukrainian Peasant Democratic Party (Ukrainian: Українська селянська демократична партія, romanized: Ukrainska selianska demokratychna partiia) is a former political party in Ukraine. It was registered with the Ministry of Justice on 15 January 1991. The party merged into the (then) new party United Left and Peasants in December 2011.

== History ==
The party ran for the parliamentary election 1998 as the part of "European Choice of Ukraine" block winning 0,13% of the votes and no seats. At the parliamentary elections on 30 March 2002, the party was part of the Team of Winter Generation alliance, which won 2.0% of the popular vote and no seats. At the parliamentary elections on 26 March 2006 the party was part of the electoral Lytvyn's People's Bloc, which won 2.44% of the popular vote and no seats.

In the 30 September 2007 elections, the party was a part of the Peasants' Bloc "Agrarian Ukraine" which again failed to win parliamentary representation.
