= Natalie Jaresko =

American economist (born 1965)

- Наталія Яресько
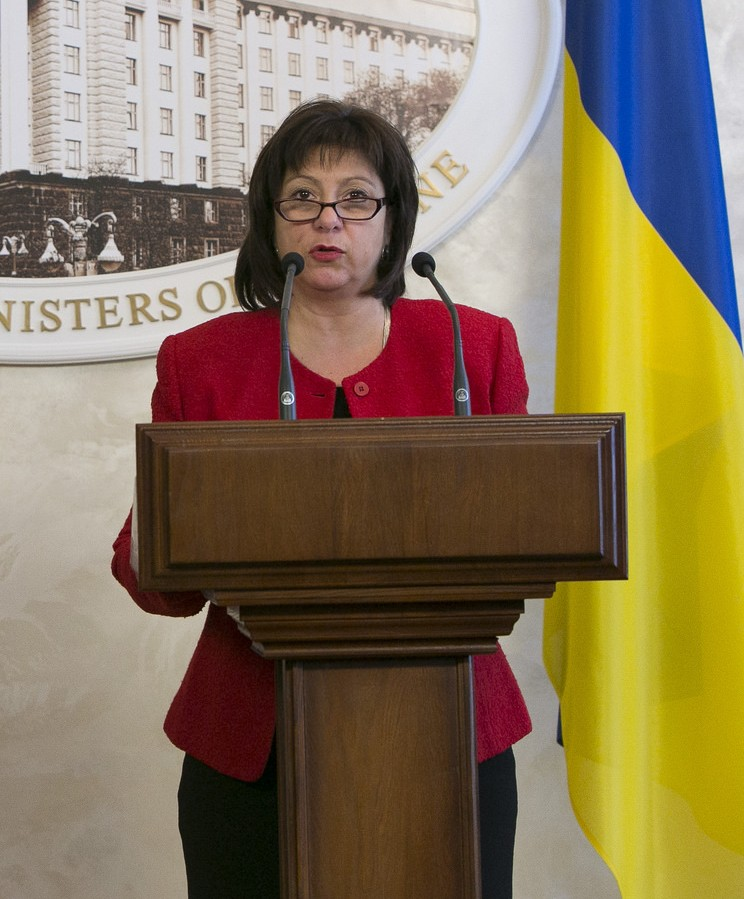
- Jaresko in 2015

Executive Director of the United States Congress's Financial Oversight and Management Board for Puerto Rico
- In office 20 March 2017 – 1 April 2022
- Preceded by: Office established
- Succeeded by: Robert F. Mujica Jr.

Minister of Finance of Ukraine
- In office 2 December 2014 – 14 April 2016
- Prime Minister: Arseniy Yatsenyuk
- Preceded by: Oleksandr Shlapak
- Succeeded by: Oleksandr Danylyuk

Personal details
- Born: 24 April 1965 (age 61) Elmhurst, Illinois, U.S.
- Party: Independent
- Education: DePaul University (BS); Harvard University (MPP)

Natalie Ann Jaresko (Note: Ukrainian: Наталія Енн Яресько, romanized: Nataliia Enn Yaresko) (born April 24, 1965, also known as Natalia Ivanivna Yaresko) (Note: Ukrainian: Наталія Іванівна Яресько, romanized: Nataliia Ivanivna Yaresko) is an American-born former U.S. State Department official and Ukrainian investment banker who served as Ukraine's Minister of Finance from December 2014 until April 2016. On 20 March 2017, she was appointed as executive director of the Financial Oversight & Management Board for Puerto Rico. Jaresko announced her resignation from the PROMESA board effective April 1, 2022. Since April 2022, she has been working as chairman of the Aspen Institute Kyiv and advisor for the non-profit Stronger Than Ever.

== Early life and education ==
Jaresko was born on 24 April 1965 in Elmhurst, Illinois, the daughter of Mary (Maria), née Budziak, and John (Ivan) Jaresko, both Ukrainian immigrants to the United States. Her father was born in Poltava Oblast during the Soviet famine of 1930–1933, during which her kulak great-grandparents, Feofan and Natalia Brazhnyk, starved to death.

Jaresko was raised with two siblings, Katherine and John, in Wood Dale, Illinois. Although her family spoke mainly English, she attended Ukrainian school on Saturdays and the Ukrainian Orthodox church on Sundays. She is bilingual in English and Ukrainian. Residing in Ukrainian Village, Chicago, she studied accounting at DePaul University, earning a B.Sc. degree in 1987. She received a master's degree in public policy from Harvard Kennedy School in 1989.

In 2011, she and her husband, Ihor Figlus, divorced. She has two daughters who live in Ukraine.

== Citizenship ==
Jaresko lived in Ukraine from 1992 to 2000, and returned in 2004. She received Ukrainian citizenship on 2 December 2014, the day of her appointment as Minister of Finance of Ukraine. She remains a U.S. citizen. Although the U.S. does not prohibit dual citizenship, Ukrainian law states that she would have to renounce her non-Ukrainian citizenship(s) within two years.

== Career ==
Starting in 1989, Jaresko held several economics-related positions at the US Department of State in Washington, D.C., and eventually coordinated activities of the State Department, the Departments of Commerce, Treasury, the United States Trade Representative, and Overseas Private Investment Corporation (OPIC) in their economic relations with the Soviet Union and its successors. As part of her work, she interacted with the International Monetary Fund, World Bank, and the European Bank for Reconstruction and Development. Later, from 1992 to 1995, she worked in the Economic Section of the U.S. Embassy in Ukraine, responsible for strengthening economic cooperation between the two countries. She has been a governor of the European Bank for Reconstruction and Development. In 2003, she was awarded the Ukrainian Order of Princess Olga for her contributions to the Ukrainian economy.

Jaresko also held several key positions in the private business sector. In February 2001, she became president and chief executive officer of Western NIS Enterprise Fund (WNISEF), which had been disbursing United States Agency for International Development (USAID) funds to small and medium-sized businesses in Ukraine and Moldova since 1995.

In 2006, she co-founded Horizon Capital, where she served as a managing partner and chief executive officer, which took over the management of WNISEF. In those positions, she established and strengthened economic ties with Ukraine and Moldova. Horizon Capital managed two funds, the Emerging Europe Growth Fund aimed at institutional and individual investors in the west, and the USAID funded Western NIS Enterprise Fund which preceded Horizon Capital. When Jaresko left Horizon Capital in December 2014, it had about $600 million of Ukrainian investments under management.

Between 2005 and 2010, Jaresko was a member of President Viktor Yushchenko's Foreign Investors Advisory Council and the advisory board of the Ukrainian Center for Promotion of Foreign Investment under the auspices of the Cabinet of Ministers of Ukraine.

Commenting on the fiscal effects of the 2022 Russian invasion of Ukraine, she characterized the economic ramifications as an "economic strangulation of the country". She said that any company that continued to do business with Russia was "indirectly financing the war".

== Ukrainian Minister of Finance ==
Nine months after the 2014 Ukrainian revolution, Jaresko was approached by headhunters for the new Ukrainian government, and within days offered the post of minister of finance.

Early in Jaresko's term, she made an outline agreement for a $40 billion four-year loan from the International Monetary Fund and Western countries.

In August 2015, Jaresko was instrumental to restructuring Ukraine's debts, including a partial write-off with a 20% haircut on Ukraine's $18 billion privately held government debt.

On 24 March 2016, shortly before she left office, she argued that the economy had to be depoliticized, and Ukraine needed a technocratic government and that she was willing to lead such a technocratic government.

Ukraine Today and the Financial Times reported speculation that Jaresko could become Ukraine's new prime minister, which was also suggested by former United States Ambassador to Ukraine Steven Pifer and President of Ukraine Petro Poroshenko. The Ukrainian Weekly reported that Jaresko had started forming a provisional technocratic Cabinet of Ministers the previous month.

Jaresko was rejected as a prime ministerial candidate by the governing coalition. When speaker of the Ukrainian parliament, Volodymyr Groysman, was elected as Ukraine's new prime minister on 14 April 2016, he did not retain Jaresko in his new Cabinet.

After she left office, Jaresko said she believed the Ukraine macroeconomic situation had stabilized, and that Ukraine needed a further $25 billion of investment beyond the agreed IMF loans to "win over the hearts and minds of Ukrainian society" as the "immediate effects [of reform] on the population have been painful."

== Later career ==
In May 2016, Jaresko became chair of the board of trustees of the Aspen Institute unit in Kyiv, a U.S. headquartered educational and policy studies NGO.

On 20 March 2017, Jaresko became the executive director of the Financial Oversight Board of Puerto Rico, as part of the PROMESA bill. Her chairmanship was accompanied by multiple protests against the FOMBPR in Puerto Rico, the largest being a protest of 100,000 people in San Juan in the summer of 2019, before announcing her resignation in February 2022 effective on 1 April 2022.

In April 2022, Jaresko became an advisor for Stronger Than Ever, a registered non-profit organization aiming to collect $5 million in support of the people of Ukraine. The non-profit was founded by Red Ventures CEO Ric Elias.

Jaresko was put on the Russian state list of "500 Americans" that was banned from entering the country following US sanctions related to the Russian invasion of Ukraine. Jaresko was ranked at 500 on the list.

== Other activities ==
- Transatlantic Commission on Election Integrity (TCEI), member (since 2018)
- Aspen Institute Kyiv, chair of the board of trustees (since 2016)
- Aspen Institute, member of the board of trustees

== Notes ==
Political offices
Preceded by Oleksandr Shlapak	Minister of Finance; 2014–2016	Succeeded by Oleksandr Danylyuk
