= Odesa National Economics University =

Public university in Odesa, Ukraine

Coordinates: 46.4784°N 30.7418°E

Odesa University of Economics
- Одеський Національний Економічний Університет
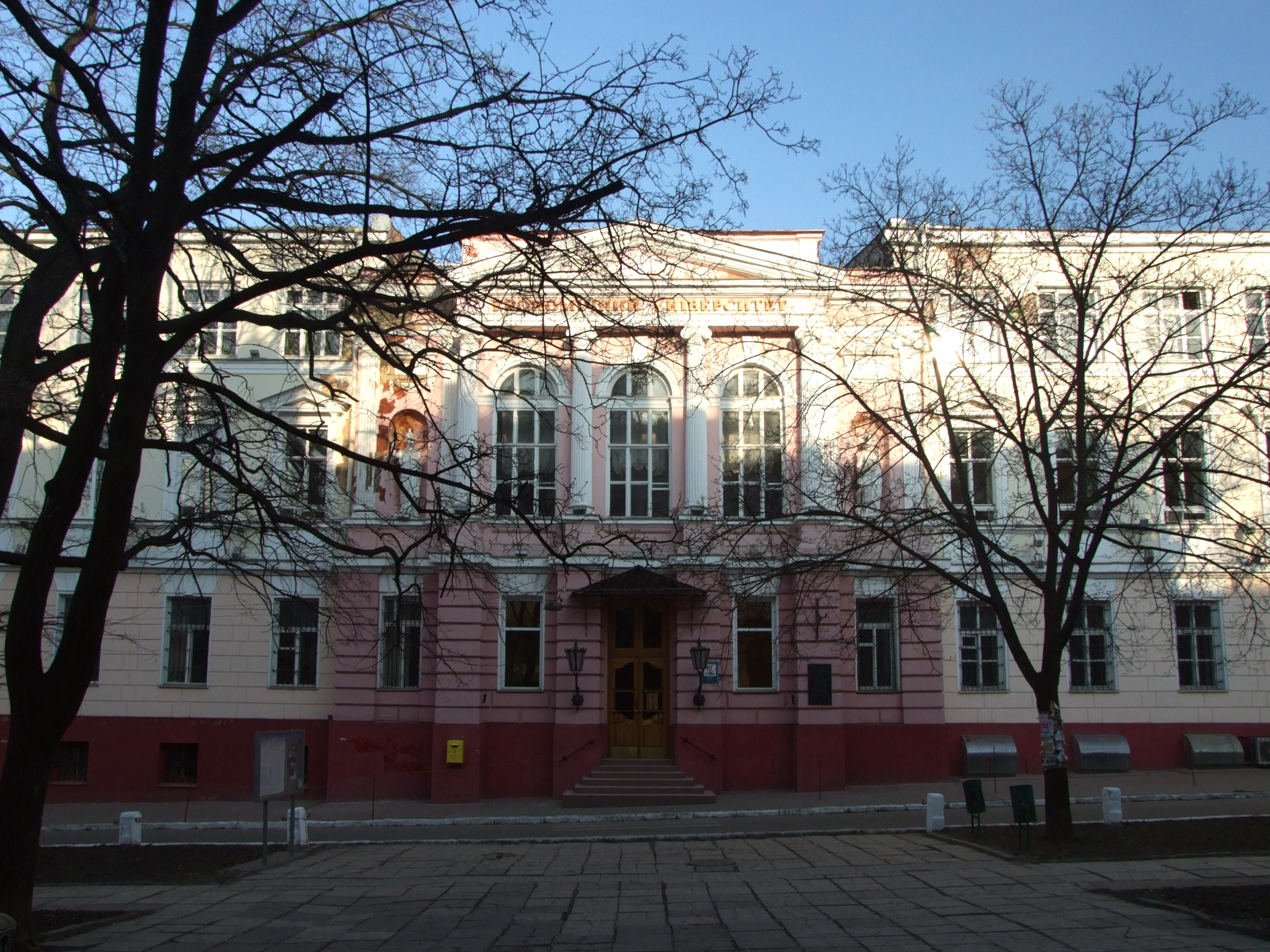
- Former names: Odesa Institute of National Economy; Odesa State University of Economics; Odesa State Economics University (OSEU)
- Type: Public
- Established: 1921
- Rector: Mikhail Ivanovich Zveryakov
- Students: 10,000
- Address: 8, Preobrazhenska str., Odesa, Ukraine
- Affiliations: Ministry of Education and Science of Ukraine
- Website: www.oseu.edu.ua

The Odesa National University of Economics (abbr. ONEU, Ukrainian: Одеський національний економічний університет, ОНЕУ, romanized: Odeskyi natsionalnyi ekonomichnyi universytet) is a public university in Ukraine, founded in 1921 for training qualified specialists in economics and conducting research over a spectrum of economic problems.

== History ==
On May 16, 1921, the Odesa Provincial Executive Committee issued an order to establish the Odesa Institute of National Economy. The founders of the university's scientific school were such outstanding scientists such as: Victor Moritzovich Shtein, Alexei Yakovlevich Shpakov, Anton Samoilovich Borinevich, Grigory Isakovich Titikin, Sergei Ivanovich Solntsev, and Gavrilo Ivanovich Tanfiliev.

Recognition of Odesa National Economic University:

- 1971 – The Odesa Institute of National Economy was awarded with the Certificate of Honor of the Presidium of the Supreme Council of the Ukrainian SSR for its success in training highly skilled professionals for the national economy and in connection with the 50th anniversary of the university's foundation.
- 1993 – The Cabinet of Ministers of Ukraine appreciated the achievements and merits of the Odesa Institute of National Economy and established the Odesa State Economic University on its basis.
- 1997 – Odesa State University of Economics was admitted to the European Association of Universities.
- 2001, 2006 – The staff of the Odesa State Economic University was awarded twice with the Certificate of Honor by the Ukraine Cabinet of Ministers for the training of highly skilled professionals.
- 2010 – The Odesa State Economic University joined the Grand Charter of the Universities of the World with headquarters in Bologna.
- 2011 – By the order of the President of Ukraine No. 1041/2011 of November 11, 2011, the university was granted a national status.

Today, the university consists of 6 campuses and 3 hostels located in the downtown of Odesa.

== Academics ==
The scientific staff of the university makes up roughly 500 members of the faculty, 55% of them holding a scientific degree, including 36 professors, doctors of science. The university employs 9 academicians, 4 honored workers of education, scientists and engineers. This allows them to carry out successfully fundamental and applied scientific research on the priority directions of science and technological development.

Integration of the Odesa State Economic University into the world educational space is confirmed by the membership in the European Association of Universities. The high international rating of the university team allows them to cooperate with 49 educational and scientific institutions of the CIS, Germany, Mexico, Israel, Austria, Holland, Italy, Romania, the Czech Republic, Bulgaria, Poland, France, etc.

Teachers and students take part in various international programs and projects such as EU DAAD, USAID, SIFE, TEMPUS-TACIS, AISEC and others. On September 14, 2010, rector of the University M.I. Zveriakov signed the Grand Charter of Universities in Bologna University, one of the oldest universities in Europe. This provides recognition of the university in Europe. The European Union Ambassador in Ukraine, Jose Pinto Teixeira, opened the Information Center of the European Union at the university. The university is included in the register of European universities operating in the context of the Bologna system on the principles of openness and mobility. The International Department of the university is successfully working on the programs of double bachelor diplomas and student exchange. Agreements have been concluded with the universities of Strasbourg (France) and Mittwayde (Germany).

Altogether 10,000 students, postgraduates, doctoral students and applicants study at the university and its departments including citizens from Vietnam, Ecuador, Israel, China, Cyprus, Congo, Moldova, Mongolia, Turkmenistan, etc.

== Departments ==
The university is structured into 5 day-time departments:

- Faculty of Economics and Enterprise Management
- Finance and economics faculty
- Accounting and economics faculty
- Credit and economics faculty
- Faculty of international economy

== See also ==
- Open access in Ukraine
- List of universities in Ukraine
