= Rasna =

Rasna can refer to:

- Rasna, the syncopated endonym, or native name of the Etruscan civilization
- Battle of Rasna, a 1st World War Eastern Front combat fought in August 1915 near Rasna (Brest Region, Belarus)
- Rasna, Brest Region, an agrotown in Brest Region (Belarus)
- Rasna, Mogilev Region, an agrotown in Mogilev Region (Belarus)
- Rasna, Vitebsk Region, a village in Vitebsk Region (Belarus)
- Rasna, Croatia, a village near Brestovac (Croatia)
- Řásná, a Czech village
- Räsna, a village in eastern Estonia
- Räsna, Lääne-Viru County, a village in northeastern Estonia
- Rasna, Požega, a village in Serbia
- Rasna (drink), an Indian soft drink brand
- Pluchea lanceolata, a medicinal herb used in Ayurveda commonly known as rasna or rasana
