= Vadym Kolesnichenko =

Russian-Ukrainian politician (born 1958)

- Вадим Колесніченко
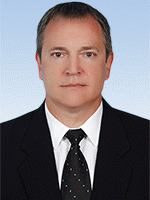
- Official Verkhovna Rada portrait, 2012

People's Deputy of Ukraine
- In office 26 March 2006 – 15 April 2014

Personal details
- Born: 21 March 1958 (age 68) Uman, Ukrainian SSR, Soviet Union
- Party: Rodina (since 2014)
- Other political affiliations: Party of Regions (2001–2014)
- Education: Uman National University; Yaroslav Mudryi National Law University

Vadym Vasylovych Kolesnichenko (Ukrainian: Вадим Васильович Колесніченко; Russian: Вадим Васильевич Колесниченко, romanized: Vadim Vasilyevich Kolesnichenko; born 21 March 1958) is a Russian and formerly Ukrainian politician who served as a People's Deputy of Ukraine from 2006 to 2014, representing the 5th, 6th, and 7th convocations as a member of the Party of Regions. In 2014, during the Russian annexation of Crimea, Kolesnichenko sided with the Russian authorities and renounced his parliamentary mandate and Ukrainian citizenship. He later joined the Russian party Rodina.

Kolesnichenko first began entering regional politics during the Soviet era, when he was appointed First Secretary of the Volodymyr-Volynskyi (now Volodymyr) City Committee of the Komsomol of Ukraine in 1981. After moving to Crimea in 1984, he became Chairman of the Commission of Control of the Yalta City Committee shortly before the collapse of the Soviet Union. While working as a political campaign manager and lawyer, in the early 1990s he became a member of the newly created Verkhovna Rada of Crimea. During his early years there, he was known for his pro-Ukrainian views, and opposed the 1992 Crimean constitution which granted Crimea the status of an autonomous republic, and also spoke out against Crimean independence. However, his political views would gradually change, and in 2001 he joined the newly formed pro-Russian Party of Regions, and helped expand its support in Crimea until he joined the Verkhovna Rada in 2006.

Over the following eight years in the parliament, he would become one of its more recognisable parliamentarians, as he co-authored a number of controversial bills. He mainly stood for the promotion of the Russian language in Ukraine, which led him to author the On the Principles of State Language Policy law passed in 2012, and was heavily against both Ukrainian ultranationalism, such as the honouring of the OUN-UPA, and was also against the promotion of the LGBTQ+ community. In the case of the latter, he co-authored bill No. 1155, which was widely condemned by European bodies. In 2014, during Euromaidan protests, he also became an Anti-Maidan member and drafted the so-called "laws on dictatorship", which was also condemned and led to widespread protests, including the 2014 Hrushevsky Street protests. After the success of Euromaidan, Kolesnichenko resigned his parliamentary mandate early after calling the events a "coup", and supported the 2014 Russian annexation of Crimea. In the now Russian Crimea, he became an adviser to the de facto Governor of Sevastopol, Sergey Menyaylo, in 2016 and attempted to run for the post of governor himself in 2017 with Rodina and later the Great Fatherland Party, but did not pass the theresholds. After his failure to enter politics multiple times again, in the 2020s he left politics to become a political pundit with 1st Sevastopol TV.

== Early life and education ==
The centre of Uman, Ukraine, in 2010. Kolesnichenko was born in Uman in 1958, although he would relocate to Crimea in 1984 after his military service there.

Kolesnichenko was born on 21 March 1958 in the city of Uman, which was located in the Ukrainian SSR of the Soviet Union at the time of his birth. His father, Vasyl, was born in 1935. According to Vadym in a parliamentary transcript, he initially stated his father died in a tank in the Belorussian SSR during the Eastern Front of World War II. He later clarified in response to media scrutiny in 2012 that it was his grandfather, Korney, who had actually died, and said the mistake was due to the stenographers of the parliament. In statements, Vadym said that Korney was a tank operator who had died in July 1944 near the village of Pelishche (Kamyenyets district) in the Belorussian SSR and was later reburied in a mass grave near Kamyenyets in the 1960s, while Vadym's father, Vasyl, worked at a tank factory during the war and lived through it. During his childhood, Vadym's parents worked at a military plant in Uman, and he spent a lot of time in Grozny. Vadym was also an athlete, specifically in hammer throwing, where he became a member of the national youth team of the Ukrainian SSR for it and the junior national team of the USSR before facing vision impairment and a back injury before the 1980 Moscow Olympics, ending his career in sports.

After graduating from secondary school, Kolesnichenko enrolled at the Uman Agricultural Institute in his hometown in 1975. While attending the school, he briefly worked as a stadium worker in Uman until 1976, when he focused full-time on his studies. Upon his graduation from the institute in 1980 with a specialisation as an agronomist, he began working as the chief agronomist of the collective farm "Slava" within the Volodymyr Raion of Volyn Oblast in March 1981. Simultaneously, while working there, he was appointed First Secretary of the Volodymyr-Volynskyi (now Volodymyr) City Committee of the Komsomol of Ukraine. He left both of these positions in 1982 to do his mandatory military service in the Soviet Army, specifically within a Strategic Rocket Forces unit in Yevpatoria, until 1984. After remaining in Yevpatoria after 1984, he was appointed foreman of the contract work for the Department of Repair and Construction of the Department of Green Space Management for Yevpatoria. In June 1985, he left this position to become an investigator for the Department for Combating Theft within the Department of Internal Affairs of the city of Yalta. According to an interview with Kolesnichenko in a Russian outlet, during this time, he was deployed to Uzbek SSR where he dealt with a case regarding cotton, and then later to the Armenian SSR where he investigated embezzlement. He said he was recalled from the role in 1989 due to the latter case by the Communist Party of Ukraine, in which he allegedly discovered that translators were misinterpreting interviews to solicit bribes in Armenia, and reassigned to strictly party roles. Regardless, after this and until the collapse of the Soviet Union, he worked as an instructor, then chairman of the Commission of Control of the Yalta City Committee.

Upon the collapse, Kolesnichenko, in March 1992, became a lawyer for the Yalta branch of "Interkontbank". He transitioned to this career after graduating from the Yaroslav Mudryi National Law University earlier that year with a specialisation as a lawyer. He only stayed there for a year until he then became a lawyer for the sanatorium "Uzbekistan" in Yalta until 1996, when he then became a lawyer for "Ulybka". Starting in 1997, he also started working in campaign management, such as for Vladimir Voronin, who became President of Moldova in 2001. Kolesnichenko remained at "Ulybka" for another three years until 1999, when he was appointed as an attorney to the local Crimean Bar Association. Upon becoming an attorney, he permanently relocated to Sevastopol from Yalta.

== Early political career in Ukraine (1991-2006) ==
According to Leonid Pilunsky, Kolesnichenko, early in his career, positioned himself as a Ukrainian patriot and was a member of the Verkhovna Rada of Crimea during its early years in the 1990s in its first convocation following independence. He was a member of the "Democratic Crimea" faction upon joining the Rada, although he was earlier registered with the Rukh, which was opposed by the ruling party of the chairman Mykola Bahrov. He also led the "For Civil Peace and Interethnic Concord" group. In May 1992, according to Pilunsky, he fiercely opposed the 1992 Crimean constitution which granted Crimea the status of an autonomous republic and said he was against politicians trying to arrange a "separatist shabash". In a statement to the Russian newspaper Nezavisimaya Gazeta that month, he also said that he would demand Bahrov's resignation for his decision to promote independence and that if the parliament had failed to cancel the independence act of 1992 he and his faction would demand self-dissolution.

In April 2001, shortly after the formation of the pro-Russian Party of Regions, Kolesnichenko joined it. Although still a lawyer, he worked as a volunteer in the early 2000s to promote the party at the regional branches in Crimea, including in Yalta and Sevastopol. He also started managing campaigns again, helping to elect one deputy to the Verkhovna Rada, Viktor Zaichko, and campaigning for around sixteen candidates on the Sevastopol City Council in 2000. Three years later, in 2003, he was appointed Deputy Chair for Ideology and Local Self-Government for the Sevastopol branch of the Party of Regions. The following year, during the 2004 Ukrainian presidential elections, he worked with and helped promote the Party of Regions candidate, Viktor Yanukovych, within Crimea, although he ultimately did not become president.

== Verkhovna Rada (2006-2014) ==
=== 2006 elections (5th convocation) ===
During the 2006 Ukrainian parliamentary elections, he initially was placed 198th, then 197th after a candidate's death on the electoral list of the Party of Regions to the Verkhovna Rada. (Note: According to other sources, he was 180th on the electoral list, contrary to 197th to he claims he was.) According to Kolesnichenko, he did not personally expect the Party of Regions to win that many seats, so he ran for and won a seat in the Sevastopol City Council at the same time, expecting he would not be elected to the Rada. In the few months he was in the council, he drafted a proposal to grant special municipal status to Sevastopol. However, the party would end up winning that many seats during the elections, which meant he was elected to the Rada. Kolesnichenko said that he initially wanted to remain in Sevastopol to work on local projects and his faction in the council, and he then attempted to withdraw his documents from the Central Election Commission of Ukraine (CEC). He said that after this the party leader, Yanukovych, then personally summoned him throughout the months of April to May in an attempt to persuade him to enter the Rada, eventually telling him to work until September and leave the Rada for Sevastopol if he did not like it. After this, Kolesnichenko allegedly agreed, withdrawing his paperwork with CEC and entering the Rada in May 2006. Upon joining the Rada, he became a member of the Committee on Justice until the early dissolution of the parliament in November 2007.

=== 2007 elections (6th convocation) ===
During the snap 2007 Ukrainian parliamentary elections, Kolesnichenko once again ran on the party list of the Party of Regions, and this time was placed slightly higher at No. 175. He was thus successfully elected, and upon rejoining the Rada, he retained his membership on the Committee on Justice he had held in the 5th convocation. This time, though, he also became Chairman of the Subcommittee on the Dismissal of Judges, which was created to respond to alleged violations of legislation. He served his full mandate until December 2012.

=== 2012 elections (7th convocation) ===
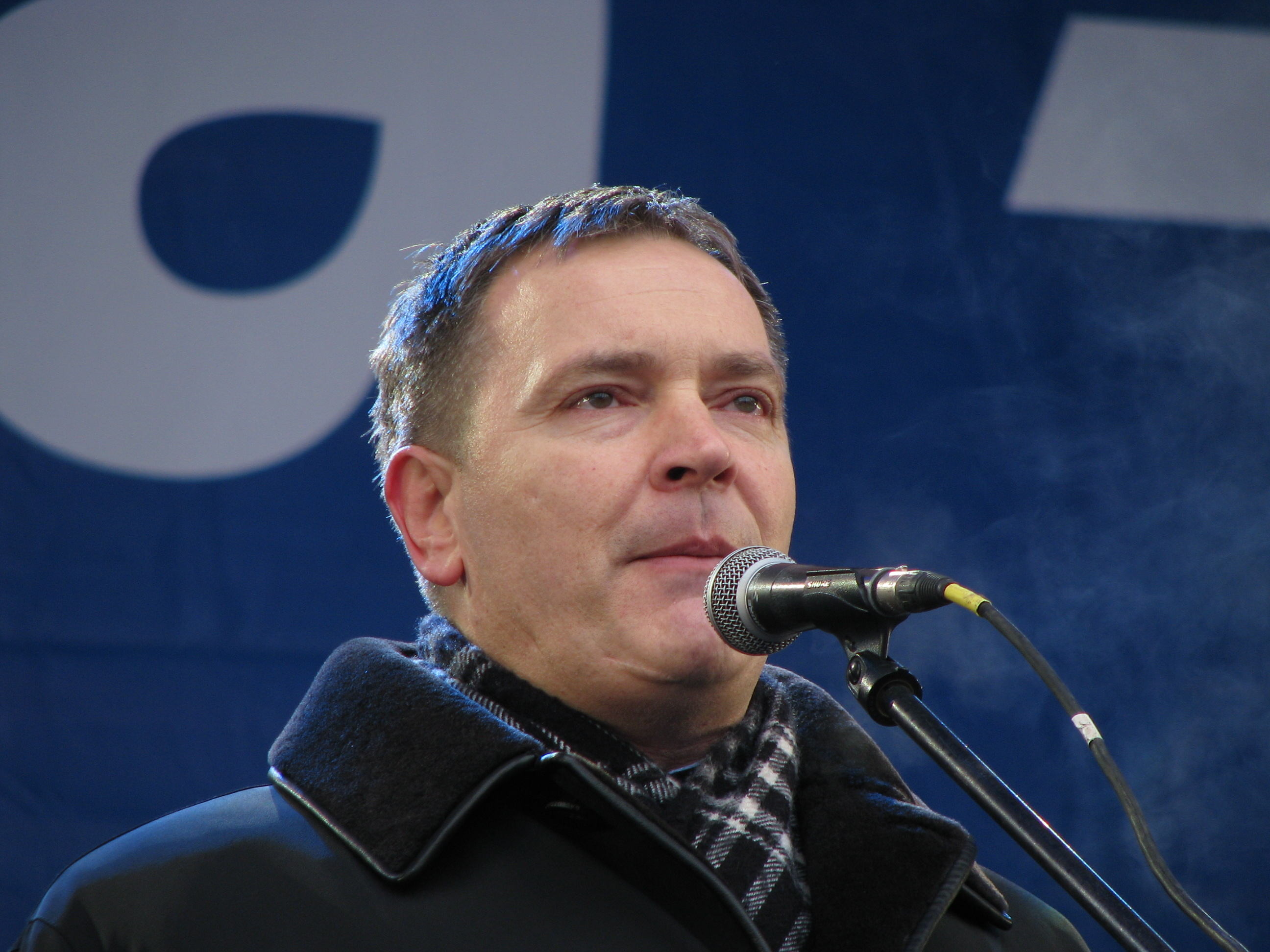
Kolesnichenko speaking in 2010 at a rally in support of Yanukovych being declared the victor of the 2010 Ukrainian presidential election.

Kolesnichenko once again re-ran during the 2012 Ukrainian parliamentary elections, although this time he opted out of the party list and instead ran in the single-member constituency No. 225. No. 225 is a district that represents parts of Sevastopol, and not the Autonomous Republic of Crimea, because it is a city with special status and is one of two in that regard alongside Kyiv. The constituency includes all of the Nakhimov District of Sevastopol and parts of the Lenin District of the city. In the end, 17 candidates would ran in the constituency for the election season, including, besides Kolesnichenko, Vasyl Parkhomenko, the former first secretary of the city committee of Sevastopol during the Soviet era, Vasyl Zelenchuk, a self-nominated candidate, and Mykola Pomohalov, a director of a children's town known as "Lukomorye". Polling done before the elections in late September put Kolesnichenko in a slight lead at 20.7%, although Parkhomenko tailed closely behind him with 20% and Pomohalov with 19%. The same poll found that Kolesnichenko's support had fallen by more than 3.5% over a few months. After the elections took place, initial reporting that same night put Kolesnichenko at the lead with 42.67%, Parkhomenko at 19.14%, and Zelenchuk at 12.23%. After nearly all the votes were counted, Kolesnichenko won the constituency with 43.01% of the vote, thus giving the Party of Regions a sweep in the two constituencies specifically for Sevastopol (alongside Pavlo Lebedyev, although Lebedyev would resign early to become Minister of Defense, triggering a by-election which Vadym Novynskyi won).

However, his win would not come without legal challenges. In interviews, although self-reported, Kolesnichenko said that more than 1,200 complaints had been filed since the results in the constituency. In November 2013, one of the previous candidates for the constituency, Viktor Neganov, and the chairman of the NGO "People's Control", attempted to have the election ruled invalid. He also cited past attempts that had been successful in this regard to the Higher Administrative Court of Ukraine, like the rulings that had stripped Ihor Markov and Oleksandr Dombrovskyi of their mandates, respectively. He officially filed the claim with the CEC on 14 November 2013, and asked for a repeat election. However, the Higher Administrative Court ultimately declined to rule in the case because it had been filed more than six months after the election results were announced, and thus was not within the legal timeframe.

== Political career in Russia ==
Kolesnichenko on a TV station in Sevastopol in 2014 discussing the Russian annexation of Crimea.

On 18 March 2014, the day of the Russian annexation of Crimea, he said he would not work in the Rada despite his mandate because of a "state coup" and that he intended to retire from politics and spend time at his dacha. A few days later, he said that although he was still a deputy and had not resigned, he had done this because of some matters that were still unresolved, but that he would soon because Ukraine had become a "puppet republic". In the same interview, he said that he was not a traitor to Ukraine, and that he had achieved and done what Crimeans in his constituency wanted, although he said by this point he had left the Party of Regions because they had blocked his bills. On 4 April 2014, he confirmed he resigned his mandate early, which was approved by the Rada on 15 April 2014. Despite his earlier statements in March, on 24 April 2014 he formally joined Rodina, a nationalist Russian party. According to the branch coordinator of Rodina, Kolesnichenko was allowed to join the party because of his important contributions to the reunification of Crimea with Russia.

More than two years later, in April 2016, he was named as an adviser to Sergey Menyaylo, the de facto Russian Governor of Sevastopol. His duties focused on public organisations and sports, and he was also president of the Sevastopol hockey federation at the time. He was also appointed leader of the Russian Crimean Football Union earlier that year. A year later, on 29 June 2017, the Sevastopol branch of Rodina nominated Kolesnichenko for the post of Governor of Sevastopol after Menyailo resigned early, with 25 of 27 delegates voting in favour. However, his nomination was struck down by the leader of Rodina, Aleksey Zhuravlyov, who said he had never approved Kolesnichenko running for the post. After this, he was instead nominated by the relatively minor Russian nationalist Great Fatherland Party on 5 July. During the early race, Kolesnichenko accused the authorities of Sevastopol to attempting to block him from running, including the eventual Governor Dmitry Ovsyannikov, and of creating fake decoy parties. However, analysts during the election said Kolesnichenko would likely not even pass the municipal filter before he could run in the main election, as this would require the signature of 12 deputies. He did in fact not get the required signatures, and although Kolesnichenko attempted to appeal to both the city court and election commission, he was rejected in both regards.

Over the following years, Kolesnichenko attempted to enter the de facto Legislative Assembly of Sevastopol multiple times with Rodina, but was barred due to not meeting the thresholds. In the 2020s, he eventually left politics due to this, and instead began to host his own program on the channel 1st Sevastopol TV, which covered political analysis of events in Russia. He also became chairman of the presidium of the International Council of Russian Compatriots, and appeared occasionally on other Russian news outlets like NewsFront, a news agency in Crimea that has been accused of disinformation.

== Political positions ==
=== Social issues ===
==== Ukrainian nationalism ====
Kolesnichenko was prominently against Ukrainian nationalism, and starting in April 2009, published statements against the Lviv branch of Svoboda and their commemoration of the 14th Waffen Grenadier Division of the SS (1st Galician). A year later, he took part in a campaign entitled "WWII participants against Bandera" due to Stepan Bandera being awarded the title of a Hero of Ukraine and held an event for the Volhynia massacre, which was perpetrated by the OUN-UPA, in Kyiv. The latter events generated controversy, as Kolesnichenko instructed Berkut to detain any protester, leading to the arrest of multiple ultranationalist politicians, including Levko Lukyanenko, who was hurt. More than six years later, the Prosecutor General's Office of Ukraine said they had found evidence about unlawful acts committed by Berkut during the campaign. Regardless, later that year, he also called Bandera "a scoundrel", saying he preferred Joseph Stalin and that the ideology of "Banderism and Nazism" was being artificially imposed on Ukraine by "Orange figures". Two years later, in 2012, he published a collection of works by scholars on the OUN and UPA, which was criticised as propaganda by some Ukrainian historians, including Volodymyr Viatrovych. He also later released a special collection, together with Nestor Shufrych, of 500 documents relating to Ukrainian nationalist organisation during the war in Dnipro, in which he claimed that the documents showed the OUN never fought the Nazis and said that the OUN's goal was to destroy the Soviet Union rather than fight for an independent Ukraine. That same year, he became co-chair of the International Antifascist Front and presented more materials in Sevastopol on the OUN.

In 2013, Kolesnichenko called for the OUNN and UPA to be recognised as criminal organisations after the draft resolution on Volhynia. He also registered a bill a few days later that brought criminal liability for "heroising" or "rehabilitating" persons or organisations that had fought against the "anti-Hitler coalition", which he listed, among other things, as the OUN, UPA, Nachtigall Battalion, and the 14th Waffen Grenadier Division. Later that year he republished Wiktor Poliszczuk's "Bitter Truth" book in Ukraine, which alleged that the OUN and UPA were criminals, and also led a print run of "Kresy Book of the Righteous" together with the Polish Institute of National Remembrance.

==== Russian language ====
Soon after joining the Rada in 2006, Kolesnichenko said that Ukraine needed to implement new laws in line with the European Charter for Regional or Minority Languages, and said that Ukraine needed to protect Russian speakers. The following year, he published a rebuttal to the Ministry of Justice of Ukraine, in which he said Russian was not an "ordinary minority language", and said that Russian should not be treated the same as all other minority languages in Ukraine, as it would give it a minimal level of protection. In April 2008, he wrote a bill, No. 1072, called "On regional languages and minority languages", which let local councils recognise a language as widespread, granted a population threshold, but it was rejected shortly thereafter by the Rada as being against the Constitution of Ukraine. Despite this, just a few months later, he said he was co-authoring a constitutional draft with the Party of Regions that would include Russian as the second state language, alongside Ukrainian. He also stated that forcing universities to lecture in Ukrainian was "ethno-cultural genocide", and said that the then Minister of Education, Ivan Vakarchuk, should be dismissed over the matter. A few years later, either in 2009 or 2010, he became chairman of the movement "Russian-speaking Ukraine", which advocated for the Russian language in the country. Despite contrary actions earlier, soon after taking the post, he said that a referendum would be the only way that Russian would become a state language and that it would be imposed on society or divide it. Instead, he said he advocated for a gradual approach that would add points about Russian in education and the media, and pass a law on local councils and their right to use minority languages like Russian.

Later that year, he was part of a group of deputies that campaigned against mandatory dubbing of Ukrainian in films under the slogan "We want to watch moves in Russian". Instead, Kolesnichenko proposed just doing this at the discretion of the theatre, and said that Hanna Chmil should be dismissed over the use of it. He also made the claim that over a "hundred laws" banned the use of Russian and that Russian was not available at all in cinemas, although this was quickly disputed by Ukrainian media outlets.

===== On the Principles of State Language Policy (2012) =====
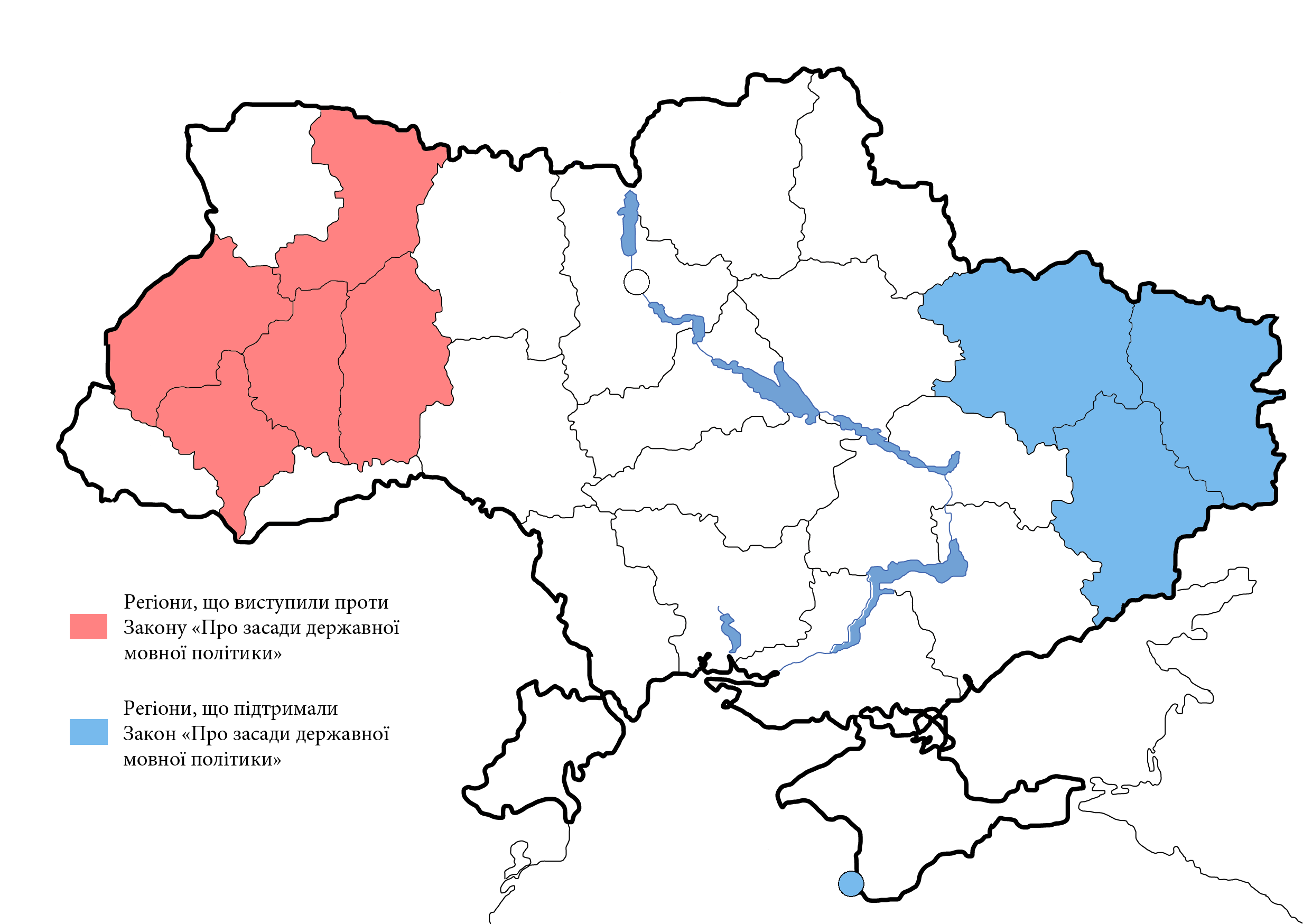
Reactions of regional committees to the "On the Principles of State Language Policy" in 2012. Sevastopol, where he represented, as a special city, voted in favour of it.

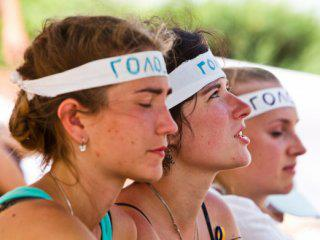
Three people hunger striking against the law in 2012.

On 29 August 2011, he registered and wrote Bill No. 9073 with Serhii Kivalov. No. 9073 was a proposal to allow regional languages to be used alongside Ukrainian virtually everywhere in Ukraine, including in passports, documents, courts, education, and media, if the language passed a threshold of 10% of a territory's population, although with some exceptions. In the note accompanying the bill, Kolesnichenko wrote that existing laws were "unsystematic" and contradictory. Although covering multiple regional languages, the main effect would be on Russian, which Kivalov and Kolesnichenko said should be declared legal in most Russian-speaking oblasts and the special status cities of Kyiv and Sevastopol. Kolesnichenko officially presented No. 9073, colloquially called the On the Principles of State Language Policy law, or the "Kivalov-Kolesnichenko Law", to the Rada on 7 February 2012, and it was taken into proposal in May 2012 under Oleksandr Yefremov. Yefremov justified the law by saying that it had included research and remarks by the Venice Commission, although shortly thereafter a number of European institutions, including the Venice Commission, opposed or criticised the law.

It was passed in its first reading on 5 June 2012, which led to rallies both in support of and against the law, which led Kolesnichenko to make public statements that the bill was in line with the programme the Party of Regions had already said and that the costs of it (which were estimated to be up to $1.5 billion to $2.1 billion) were a "hoax". The Rada passed it in the second reading as a whole on 3 July 2012. After the second reading, riots began in Kyiv, which led the Chairman of the Verkhovna Rada, Volodymyr Lytvyn, to temporarily resign, although he later turned around and signed the bill on 31 July, with Yanukovych completing its implementation on 8 August. Years later, in 2026, an investigation by OCCRP accused Kolesnichenko of receiving 1.2 million rubles from the Russian Pravfond for reports that supported the law, and that Pravfond's head, Igor Panevkin, gave specific instructions on the law.

==== Euromaidan ====
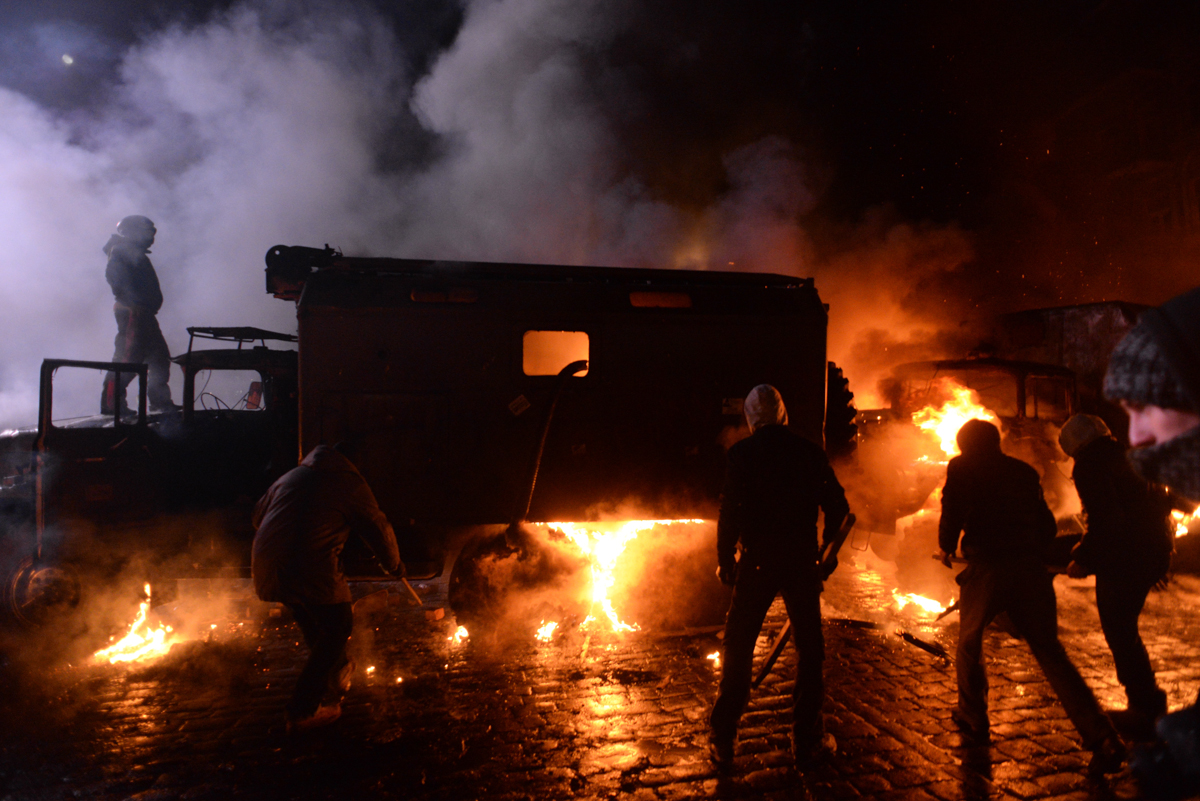
Hrushevsky Street protests in January 2014, which started due to the so-called "laws on dictatorship", which he co-authored earlier that month.

Kolesnichenko was also heavily against Euromaidan, and during its early start in December, he spoke at a rally of supporters of the Party of Regions where he reportedly called Euromaidan protestors "scum seeking to seize power", and said that they were receiving support from foreign states. A month later, in January, as the protests grew, he accused Euromaidan of being dominated by nationalism, xenophobia, and Nazism and called the figures supporting it as united around a "fascist ideology" in response to a march on Bandera's birthday. Days later, on 16 January, he helped draft the so-called "laws on dictatorship" together with Volodymyr Oliinyk. Kolesnichenko said the laws were meant to protect citizens' security, although he was also accused of significantly curbing the rights to protest and free speech in response to Euromaidan. The laws would spark heavy clashes around Kyiv, leading to a compromise on 28 January, when the Rada repealed nine of the laws. With the outbreak of the 2014 Hrushevsky Street protests in Kyiv in response to the "laws on dictatorship", Kolesnichenko accused Euromaidan of having split, with one side being militants trained by Western special services, and said the opposition was deliberately using people as cannon fodder while having no demands. In a follow-up interview, he repeated his claims that foreign special services were directing the opposition in Euromaidan, and said that there were "foreign experts" in Kyiv posing as journalists who had recruited militants. He also said the project by these so-called special services was to destroy Ukraine like Yugoslavia in the Yugoslav Wars. Kolesnichenko eventually left the Rada early, and with a security detail, moved to Sevastopol while affirming that he was proud of the "laws on dictatorship" he had helped co-author.

==== LGBTQ rights ====
On 30 March 2012, he registered a bill that banned "propaganda of homosexuality" towards minors, which he defined as rallies, parades, lessons, media reports, and school materials that viewed LGBTQ+ positively. He proposed fining 1,700 hryvnias for individuals and more for entities or demonstrations, with repeated offences leading to arrests of up to three to five years. That same year, he and Yana Salmin registered a new bill, No. 1155, which was recommended to the Rada in April 2013. The bill allegedly called homosexuality a "congenital hormonal disorder" and said that Ukraine needed to respect traditional families and traditions. This bill would receive international condemnation from human rights groups, with some US legislators sending letters to Volodymyr Rybak not to adopt it and the Human Rights Watch urging the bill to be voted down, especially as they said it could interfere with relations with the European Parliament. Later, bodies of the United Nations and European Union urged the bill not to be adopted, with the Netherlands threatening to veto any visa liberalisation with Ukraine if it was. The bill was eventually removed from circulation after Euromaidan in April 2014.

=== Foreign policy ===
==== Russia ====
In a September 2008 interview, Kolesnichenko said he saw the Black Sea Fleet's presence as a security guarantee from Russia. He also said an image was being created of Russia as the enemy, so that Ukraine would join NATO. Two years later, he again defended the Black Sea Fleet being stationed in Crimea, despite the fleet not having a separate lease agreement at the time. He said that the agreement was already settled because Ukraine had previously been in debt for gas, and this had been resolved. He also defended the agreements in Kharkiv that extended the Black Sea Fleet in Crimea, and said that regardless Ukraine controlled everything of the activity of the fleet. In February 2014, during an emergency congress of deputies in Kharkiv, he addressed the Congress by saying, "we are for friendship with Russia!" and led a chant of "Russia!" to the deputies.

==== European Union ====
Kolesnichenko largely objected to Ukraine being in the European Union, first saying in 2011 that Ukraine had spent the last five years pursuing integration with the European Union while only receiving demands. For example, he said that Ukraine had joined the World Trade Organisation because of the EU (which occurred in 2008), although he said it could have a negative effect on the agricultural sector of Ukraine. In August 2013, he registered a bill that would remove the stated foreign policy of Ukraine to obtain accession to the European Union, and he advocated canceling the European Union–Ukraine Association Agreement before it was signed. He argued that Ukrainians were split about the EU, and that Ukraine should not focus on it if they were not in a majority, and that integration would give a loss of sovereignty to Ukraine. However, in October, he said that the association agreement would likely be signed because Europe "needed Ukraine" because of politics against Russia. Later that year, in October, he signed the "Sofia Club" declaration in Sofia, Bulgaria, which said the country would not be a "Berlin Wall" for the European Union, and instead proposed a "New United Europe" that would include the EU, Eastern European countries, including Russia and Ukraine, and Turkey. However, with Euromaidan protests raging, in February 2014 he accused Western leaders of provoking the situation, namely listing Angela Merkel of Germany.

==== Customs Union ====
In 2011, he said that he preferred the Customs Union membership over the EU. In 2013, he said that Ukraine would negotiate with the Customs Union on more than 70 protocols.

==== United States ====
In an interview in 2011, he dismissed an annual human rights report from the State Department of the United States, and said the country did not need "lectures from the US". In March 2013, in response to an assessment by the US that Ukraine was drifting towards authoritarianism, he said that the US was a country of "world authoritarianism". That same year, he proposed an investigative committee to assess the threat to national security due to programs by US companies in Ukraine, and that the microchips that the US delivered were being used to track Ukrainians' personal data and given to US security services.

== Personal life ==
He is married to Lilia Petrovna Makedon. Together, they have one son, Vsevolod, who was born in 2006. However, in April 2017, Lilia petitioned the Darnytskyi District Court of Kyiv to deprive Vadym of his parental rights over Vsevolod. In response, Kolesnichenko said that Lilia had allegedly tried to "kidnap" their son in a scheme with the Security Service of Ukraine and take him to a foreign country from Crimea to be raised there, but said this was initially prevented by the watch of the Federal Border Service of Russia. However, he said that she apparently succeeded later in moving him.

Prior to 2014, when he was in the Rada, he was registered at and lived in Apartment 244 at 24 Sribnokilska Street in Kyiv. He also maintained a residence in the city of Sevastopol, where he had been living since 1999. After 2014, he permanently moved back to Sevastopol in the now Russian Crimea. He received Russian citizenship shortly thereafter on 31 March 2014. In connection with this, in April, the acting President of Ukraine, Oleksandr Turchynov said he intended to deprive him of his Ukrainian citizenship because Ukraine prohibited dual citizenship at the time.

=== Legal issues in Ukraine ===
On 16 September 2015, the Security Service of Ukraine summoned Kolesnichenko for questioning in Kyiv for alleged attempts to violate the territorial integrity of Ukraine (Article 110, Part 2 and Article 161, Part 3). The SBU had previously issued a warrant for his arrest in January 2015. Later that month, on 22 September, the Shevchenkivskyi District Court of Kyiv allowed pre-trial investigations in absentia against him by the Prosecutor General's Office of Ukraine. In connection with this, he was summoned the following day by the SBU. Nearly a decade later, in November 2024, he was sentenced in a separate case by a court for inciting national hatred for his actions in April 2010 when Berkut police under his direction attacked protestors at an exhibition about the OUN-UPA. In regard to this case, he was sentenced to five years in prison in absentia. The following month, he was notified in a third case, this time for suspicion of high treason and glorification of Russia. These charges he faced would have given him life imprisonment.

=== Copyright infringement accusations ===
In May 2012, Timothy Snyder, a professor at Yale University specialising in the history of Eastern Europe and the Holocaust, accused Kolesnichenko of copyright infringement. He said that an excerpt that he had published in the "New York Review of Books" was reprinted without his permission in the collection "The OUN and UPA: A Study on the Creation of "Historical" Myths", which was authored and published by the International Antifascist Front, which Kolesnichenko co-led. He said that the front had attempted to ask for permission prior, but he had declined. Snyder then said that the article was still published regardless. Later, Kolesnichenko admitted the text was republished without permission, although Snyder said he wished for the collection books to be destroyed. After this, two other authors who were featured in the book, Grzegorz Rossolinski-Liebe and Per Rudling, also responded and accused him of infringement. In a joint statement, Rudling and Rossolinski-Liebe said they considered the approach unethical and also said that they opposed their works being used for "political instrumentalisation by the Party of Regions". A year later, in 2013, another author, John-Paul Himka, also came forward and accused him of infringement in another book he had recently published. In an op-ed for Istorychna Pravda, Himka said that he had infringed on both him and Rudling, although he also said that Kolesnichenko had indeed contacted him before the publication of the book for permission. However, Himka said he had declined to be included in the book, even though he was, because he said that Kolesnichenko was deliberately politicising the issue and that it was a cheap instrumentalisation.

== Honours and awards ==
Kolesnichenko has been awarded the following honours and awards:

- Russia:
  - Order of Friendship (2008)
  - Pushkin Medal (2013)
  - Medal "For the Liberation of Crimea and Sevastopol" (2014)
- By the UOC-MP:
  - Medal of the Holy Equal-to-the-Apostles Prince Vladimir (2007)
  - Order of the Pochaev Icon of the Most Holy Theotokos (2009)

In addition, Kolesnichenko was formerly honoured with the following awards. However, on 22 November 2024, in accordance with Presidential Decree No. 779, all of his awards awarded by Ukraine were revoked and declared null by Ukrainian President Volodymyr Zelenskyy as a person under sanctions by the state.

- Ukraine:
  - Commemorative Award "For Merit to Sevastopol" (2008)
  - Honoured Lawyer of Ukraine (2010)
  - Diploma and Badge of Distinction "Public Recognition" (2010)
  - Gold Star – Honour and Dignity (2010)
  - Honorary Distinction of the National University Odesa Law Academy
