= Machulishcha =

Machulishcha or Machulishche may refer to:

- Machulishcha, Brest region, Belarus
- Machulishcha, Minsk district, Belarus
- Machulishcha, Lahoysk district, Belarus

== See also ==
- Machulishchy
