= Makarava, Brest region =

Makarava Макарава (Belarusian)
- Agrotown
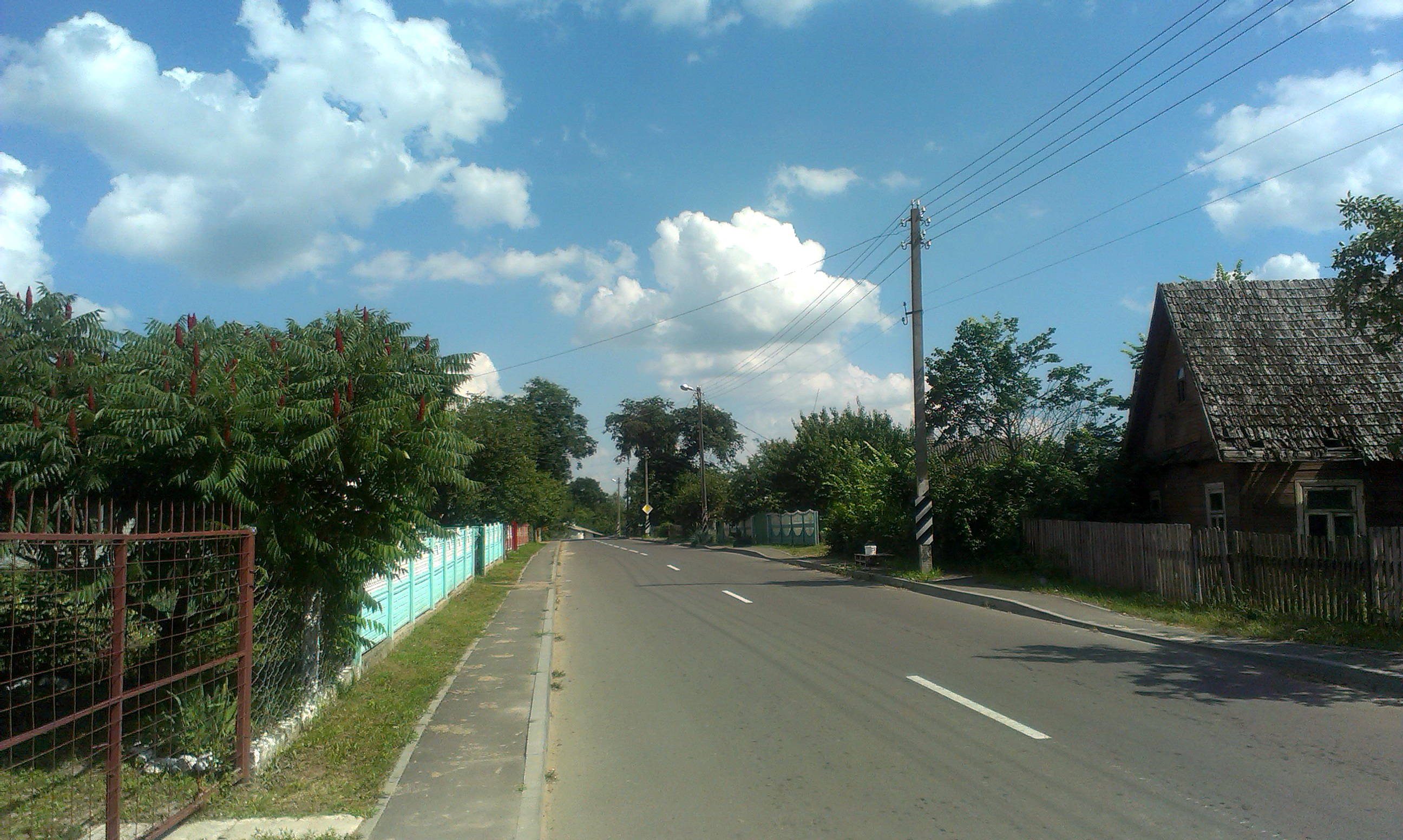

- Location within Belarus
- Coordinates: 52°21′0″N 23°19′0″E
- County: Belarus
- Region: Brest Region
- District: Kamyenyets District
- Time zone: UTC+3 (MSK)

Makarava (Belarusian: Макарава; Russian: Макарово; Polish: Makarowo) is an agrotown in Kamyenyets District, Brest Region, Belarus. It is part of Aharodniki selsoviet. It is located 334 kilometres (208 mi) south of the capital Minsk.
