= Battle of Rasna =

- Part of the Eastern Front of the World War I
Location	Rasna, Russian Empire (now located in Belarus)
Result	Austro-Hungarian victory

Belligerents
Austria-Hungary	Russian Empire

Units involved
1st Brigade of the Polish Legions	6th Infantry Division

The battle of Rasna was a battle of the Eastern Front of the World War I, fought from 21 to 24 August 1915. The combat took place near the village of Rasna, Russian Empire (now located in Belarus), near the Pulwa river. It was fought by the 6th Infantry Division of the Russian Empire, defending themselves in the fortifications, against the 1st Brigade of the Polish Legions of the Austria-Hungary. The battle was won by the Austro-Hungarian forces. Following the battle, the retreating Russian forces were chased by the group commanded by major Leon Berbecki.
