= Pyaski, Kamyenyets district =

Pyaski Пяскі (Belarusian)
- Village
- Location within Belarus
- Coordinates: 52°19′0″N 23°22′0″E
- Country: Belarus
- Region: Brest Region
- District: Kamyenyets District
- Time zone: UTC+3 (MSK)

Pyaski (Belarusian: Пяскі, romanized: Piaski; Russian: Пяски) is a village in Kamyenyets District, Brest Region, Belarus. It is part of Aharodniki selsoviet. It is located 338 kilometres (210 mi) south-west of the capital Minsk and near the border with Poland.
