= Pulwa =

Pulwa Пульва
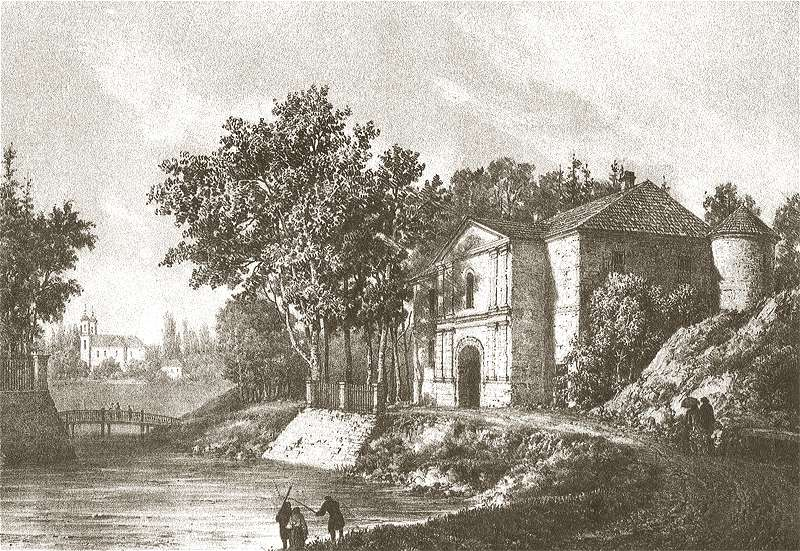

Location
- Country: Poland, Belarus

Physical characteristics
- Mouth
  - location: Bug
  - coordinates: 52.2111°N 23.3528°E

Basin features
- Progression: Bug→ Narew→ Vistula→ Baltic Sea

Pulwa (Belarusian: Пульва - Pul'va) is a river of Poland and Belarus, a tributary of the Bug River. Its source is near the village Werpol, eastern Poland. It crosses the Belarusian border, flows through the towns Vysokaye, Aharodniki and Voŭčyn, and joins the Bug near Stavy, on the border with Poland.
