= Aharodniki rural council =

Aharodniki rural council (Belarusian: Агародніцкі сельсавет; Russian: Огородникский сельсовет) is a lower-level subdivision (selsoviet) of Kamyenyets District, Brest Region, Belarus. Its administrative center is the agrotown of Aharodniki.

It includes the following populated places:

- Aharodniki (agrotown)
- Bulka (village)
- Kavaliki (village)
- Khmyali (village)
- Koladna (village)
- Machulishcha (village)
- Makarava (agrotown)
- Plyanta (village)
- Pyaski (village)
- Svitsichy (village)
- Takary (village)
- Vryaba (village)
- Vyalikiya Kamarniki (village)
- Zalyessye (village)
- Zarechcha (village)
