= Khmyali =

Village in Brest Region, Belarus

Khmyali Хмялі (Belarusian)
- Village
- Location within Belarus
- Coordinates: 52°19′0″N 23°20′0″E
- Country: Belarus
- Region: Brest Region
- District: Kamyenyets District
- Time zone: UTC+3 (MSK)

Khmyali (Belarusian: Хмялі, romanized: Chmiali; Russian: Хмели, romanized: Khmeli; Polish: Chmiele) is a village in Kamyenyets District, Brest Region, Belarus. It is part of Aharodniki selsoviet. It is located 318 kilometres (198 mi) south-west of the capital Minsk and near the border with Poland.
