= Koladna =

Koladna (Belarusian: Коладна) or Kolodno (Russian: Колодно) may refer to the following places in Belarus:

- Koladna, Brest District, a former village in Brest District, Brest Region
- Koladna, Kamyenyets District, a village in Kamyenyets District, Brest Region
