= Katera =

Katera may refer to:

- Katera, Belarus, a village in Belarus
- Katera of Toro, omukama of the Kingdom of Toro, from 1876 until 1877

== See also ==
- Kathera, town in Uttar Pradesh, India
