= Mykola Azarov =

Prime Minister of Ukraine from 2010 to 2014

- Микола Азаров; Николай Азаров
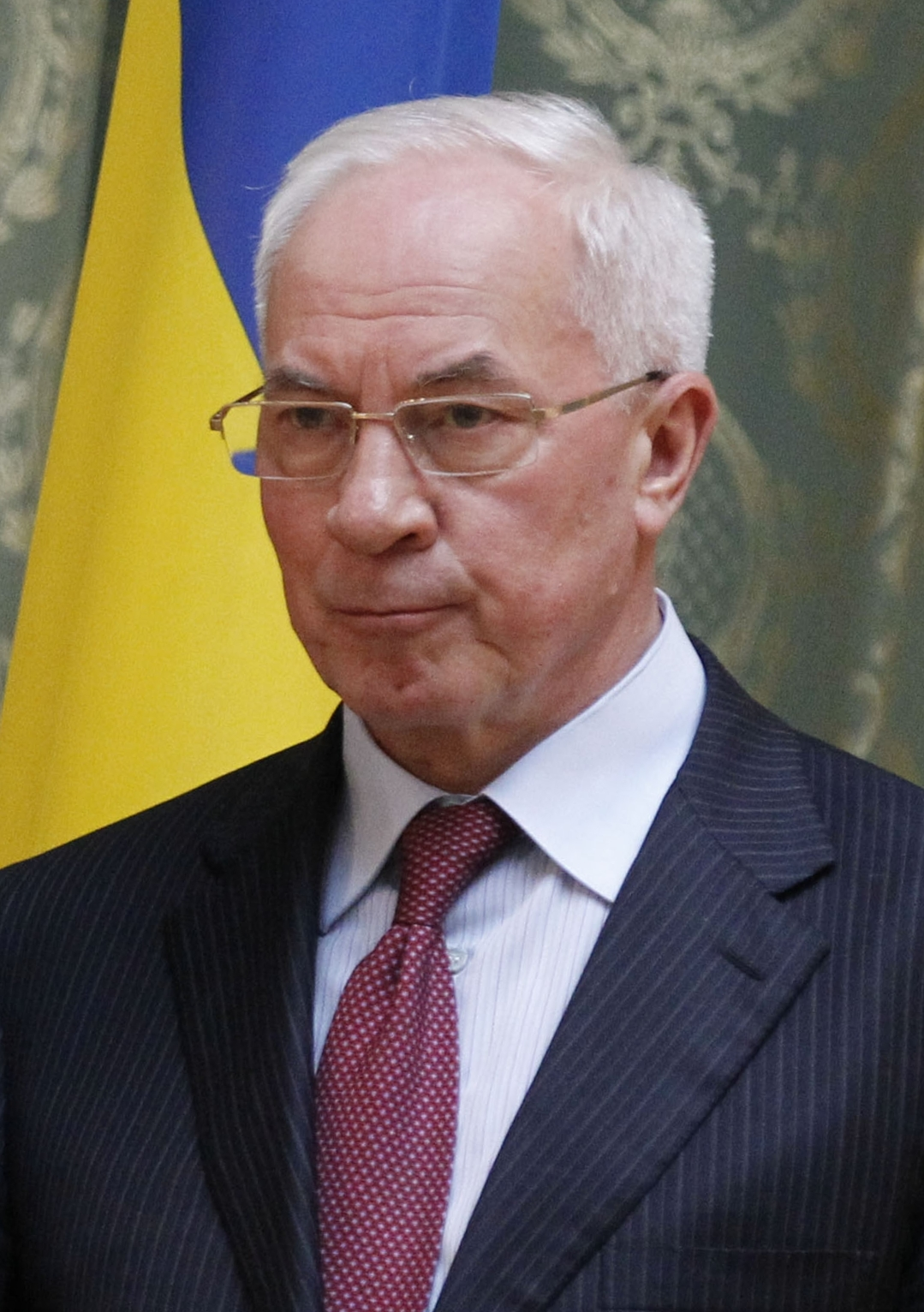
- Azarov in 2012

14th Prime Minister of Ukraine
- In office 11 March 2010 – 28 January 2014
- President: Viktor Yanukovych
- Deputy: Andriy Klyuyev (2010–12); Valeriy Khoroshkovskyi (2012); Serhiy Arbuzov (2012–14)
- Preceded by: Oleksandr Turchynov (acting)
- Succeeded by: Serhiy Arbuzov (acting)
- In office 5 January 2005 – 24 January 2005; Acting
- President: Leonid Kuchma; Viktor Yushchenko
- Preceded by: Viktor Yanukovych
- Succeeded by: Yulia Tymoshenko
- In office 7 December 2004 – 28 December 2004; Acting
- President: Leonid Kuchma
- Preceded by: Viktor Yanukovych
- Succeeded by: Viktor Yanukovych

Deputy Prime Minister of Ukraine
- In office 4 August 2006 – 18 December 2007
- Prime Minister: Viktor Yanukovych
- Preceded by: Stanislav Stashevsky
- Succeeded by: Oleksandr Turchynov
- In office 26 November 2002 – 3 February 2005
- Prime Minister: Viktor Yanukovych; Yulia Tymoshenko
- Preceded by: Oleh Dubyna
- Succeeded by: Anatoliy Kinakh

Minister of Finance
- In office 4 August 2006 – 18 December 2007
- Prime Minister: Viktor Yanukovych
- Preceded by: Viktor Pynzenyk
- Succeeded by: Viktor Pynzenyk
- In office 26 November 2002 – 3 February 2005
- Prime Minister: Viktor Yanukovych; Yulia Tymoshenko
- Preceded by: Ihor Yushko
- Succeeded by: Viktor Pynzenyk

Personal details
- Born: Nikolai Yanovich Pakhlo; 17 December 1947 (age 78) Kaluga, Russian SFSR, Soviet Union (now Russia)
- Citizenship: Ukrainian
- Party: Party of Regions (2001–2014)
- Other political affiliations: Civil Congress of Ukraine (1992); Party of Labor (1992–2001)
- Spouse: Lyudmyla Azarova
- Children: Oleksiy
- Education: Moscow State University

Mykola Yanovych Azarov (Note: Ukrainian: Микола Янович Азаров, Ukrainian pronunciation: [mɪˈkɔlɐ ˈjanowɪt͡ʃ ɐˈzarou̯]; Russian: Николай Янович Азаров, romanized: Nikolay Yanovich Azarov, Russian pronunciation: [nʲikɐˈlaj‿janɐvʲit͡ɕ ɐˈzarɐf]) (né Pakhlo, Cyrillic: Пахло; born 17 December 1947) is a Russo-Ukrainian politician who was the Prime Minister of Ukraine from 11 March 2010 to 27 January 2014. He was the First Vice Prime Minister and Finance Minister from 2002 to 2005 and again from 2006 to 2007. Azarov also served ex officio as an acting prime minister in the First Yanukovych Government when Viktor Yanukovych ran for president at first and then upon the resignation of his government.

Following the victory of Viktor Yanukovych in the 2010 presidential election, Azarov succeeded Yanukovych as leader of the Party of Regions and was appointed as prime minister in March 2010. In January 2014, after weeks of Euromaidan protests and the 2014 Hrushevskoho Street riots, (Note: The Ministry of Internal Affairs of Ukraine claimed on 25 January 2014 that a policemen who was walking home in civilian clothing had been killed by a shot in his head.) Azarov offered his letter of resignation. After the Revolution of Dignity, Azarov fled to Russia and according to Azarov himself, was allegedly offered "political refugee status on the personal instructions of Vladimir Putin". Since then he has been reportedly living in the vicinity of the Russian village of Petrovo-Dalneye, near Moscow.

Since July 2014, Azarov has been on the international wanted list for alleged abuse of power. On 19 January 2015 Kyiv District Court of Pechersk Raion issued an arrest warrant as a preventive measure to allow for the extradition of Azarov from the Russian Federation. Azarov is currently the subject of international sanctions from the U.S., European Union, Norway, Canada, and Switzerland due to his role in the Euromaidan. In 2015, he set up the Ukraine Salvation Committee, a government in exile that was widely seen as a pro-Russian puppet.

== Early life, education and career ==
Azarov was born in Kaluga on 17 December 1947 in the Russian SFSR, Soviet Union, to a half-Russian and half-Estonian father, Jaan Pahlo, and a Russian mother, Yekaterina Pavlovna Kvasnikova, as Nikolay Pakhlo. When he married his wife, Lyudmila Azarova, he took her name. Azarov attended the Moscow State University where he earned his doctorate in geology and mineralogy in 1973. He worked at the Tulaugol coal enterprise until 1976. Azarov moved to Donetsk permanently in 1984 to become deputy director of the Ukrainian State Geological Institute, that he went on to head. In 1984–1995 he was a deputy director and director of Ukraine's State Research and Design Institute of Mining Geology and Geomechanics. In 1991 he was hired as a professor at Donetsk National Technical University.

== Political career ==
=== Parliamentary career ===
In 1994 Azarov was elected member of the Verkhovna Rada (the Ukrainian parliament) for the first time, representing the Petroskiy electoral district, located in the city of Donetsk. In 1995–1997 he served as head of the parliament's Committee on Budgets while also sitting on the Verkhovna Rada's presidium. In parliament, he belonged to an inter-regional group of MPs supporting then-President of Ukraine Leonid Kuchma. In 1995, while carrying on as an MP, Azarov was appointed an adviser to the currency council of the Cabinet of Ministers of Ukraine. In 1996 he became Chairman of the State Tax Administration of Ukraine.

=== Head of State Tax Administration ===
Azarov was a long-term (1996–2002) head of the State Tax Administration. During this period tax inspections were used to limit the freedom of the press in Ukraine. On tapes made during the Cassette Scandal Azarov is heard speaking on recordings, secretly recorded in Kuchma's office by Kuchma's bodyguard Mykola Melnychenko, about using his position as the head of the tax authority to pressure officials to ensure Kuchma's reelection in 1999. Critics also stated that the recordings implicated Azarov in other corrupt schemes, including allegedly covering up graft at the state natural gas company Naftogaz, aiding the demise of the Slaviansk Bank (which was connected to Yulia Tymoshenko's natural gas company United Energy Systems of Ukraine) and illegal funding of Kuchma's 1999 election campaign. Azarov has vehemently refuted all these allegations. In 2002, he accused Slavyansk Bank president Borys Feldman of being behind the Cassette Scandal recordings.

=== First Vice Prime Minister and Finance Minister ===
In 2001 he became the head of the Party of Regions but resigned from the post in less than a year. In 2003 Azarov was elected chairman of the Party of Regions political council. In 2002, the European Choice parliamentary group nominated him for the prime minister's post. Still, he declined, standing aside for Viktor Yanukovych, who assumed both the leadership of the Party of Regions and the Prime Minister's job. Azarov was appointed First Vice Prime Minister and Finance Minister in late November 2002, when the first Yanukovych Government took office. During the first Yanukovych Government governing the set of economic reforms was implemented including fiscal, tax, pensionary, regulatory reforms. During Azarov's first term as Finance Minister, the annual GDP growth was 9.6% in 2003 and 12.1% in 2004 (cf. 2.7% in 2005) in Ukraine, with capital investments of 31.3% and 28.0% (cf. 1.9% in 2005).

Azarov first served as acting prime minister from 7 December 2004 to 28 December 2004, after Yanukovych was put on vacation leave by President Kuchma in the midst of the Orange Revolution. After the runoff, Yanukovych attempted to resume his duties as prime minister, but effectively unable to do so, announced his resignation on 31 December 2004, and Azarov was named acting prime minister again. The Yanukovych Cabinet was officially dismissed on 5 January 2005. Azarov continued as acting prime minister until shortly after the inauguration of Viktor Yushchenko, when Yulia Tymoshenko was appointed prime minister on 24 January 2005. Azarov remained a strong political ally of Yanukovych, and again became a member of parliament for the Party of Regions after the 2006 Parliamentary elections. When Yanukovych became prime minister again on 4 August 2006, Azarov was elected the First Vice Prime Minister and Finance Minister in the second Yanukovych Government.

=== Prime minister ===
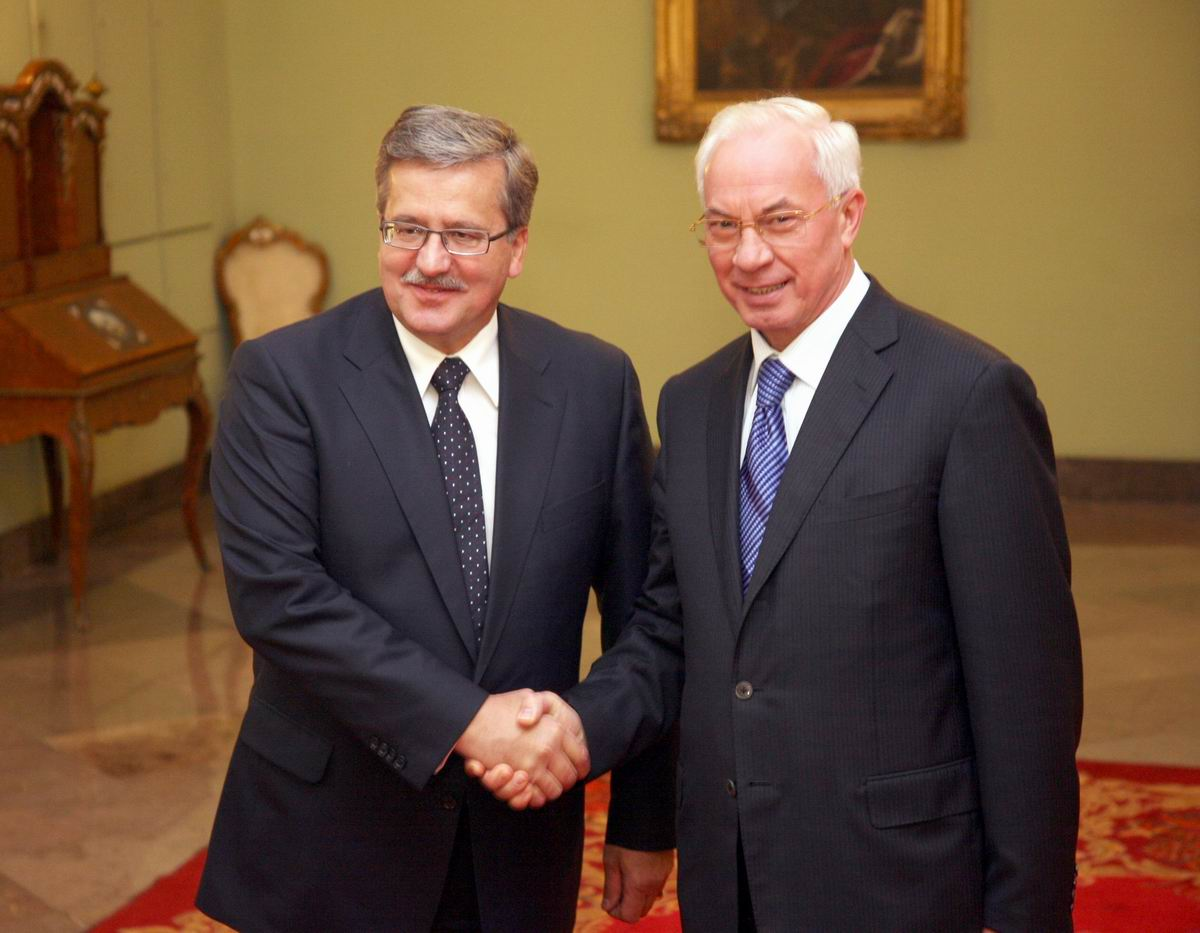
Polish President Bronisław Komorowski and Azarov (30 September 2010)

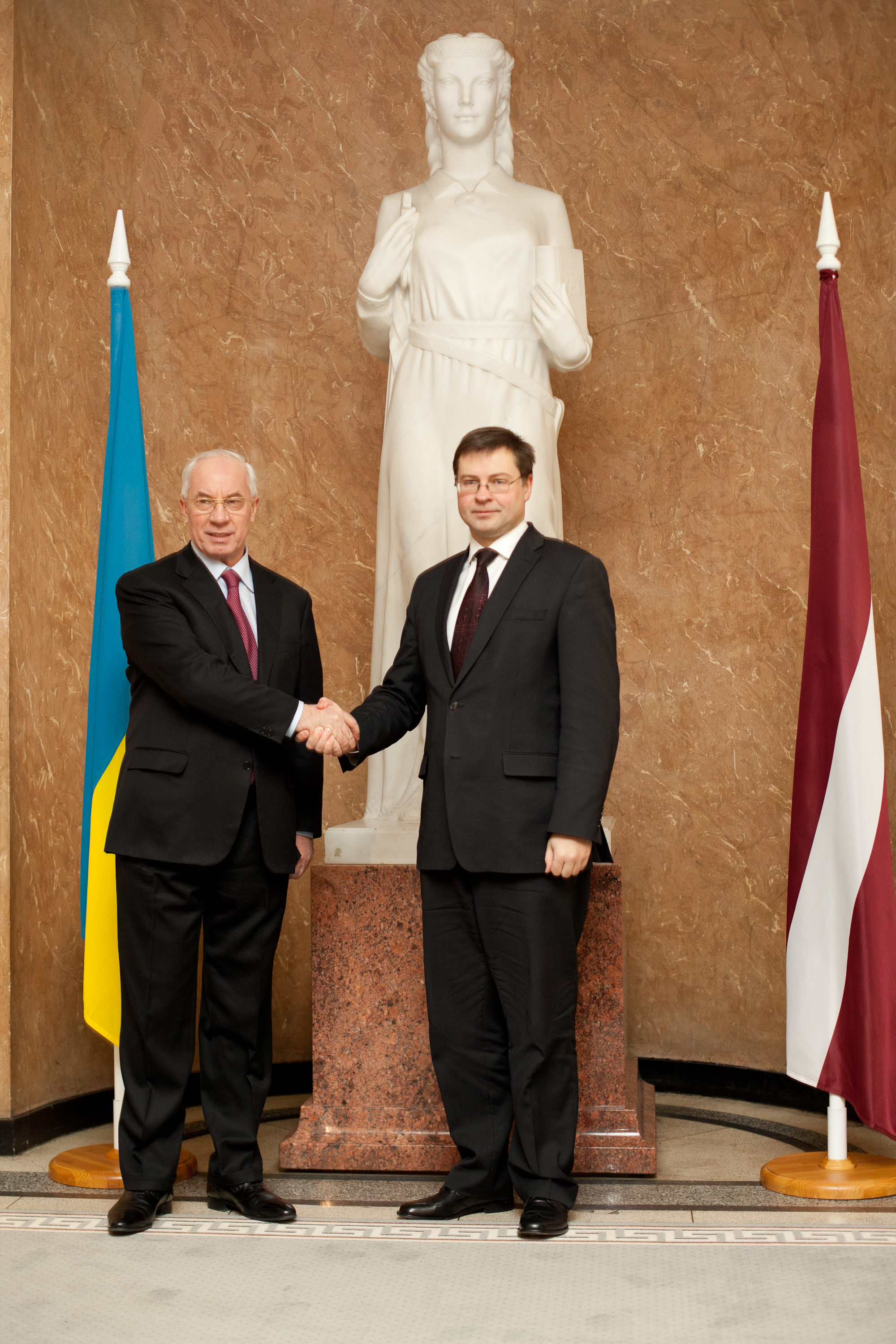
Azarov and Latvian Prime Minister Valdis Dombrovskis (10 February 2012)

Following his election as President of Ukraine, Viktor Yanukovych offered three candidates for prime minister on 21 February 2010: Sergei Tigipko, Our Ukraine faction member Arseniy Yatsenyuk and Azarov. Azarov had headed Yanukovych's election campaign during the 2010 Presidential elections. The Verkhovna Rada appointed Azarov Prime Minister of Ukraine on 11 March 2010. Of the 343 lawmakers registered in the session hall, 242 voted in favor of the appointment. The following month he was elected head of the Party of Regions. In 28 October 2012 parliamentary election he was (re)-elected into parliament heading the party list of Party of Regions. Following Azarov's resignation as prime minister on 3 December 2012 (after several cabinet members including Azirov were elected to parliament in the previous election, something which obliged them to give up their ministerial mandates) his cabinet stayed on as caretaker government from 3 December 2012. On 5 December President Yanukovych stated "Azarov has good chances of remaining prime minister, (but) a lot will depend on whom he brings to his team". On 9 December Yanukovych nominated him for a new term as prime minister. This nomination was approved by parliament on 13 December 2012. On 24 December 2012 the second Azarov Government was appointed by President Yanukovych.

=== Resignation as Prime Minister ===
Azarov resigned on 28 January 2014 amid heavy riots and the Euromaidan protests. According to his cabinet, Azarov was quoted saying that "To create additional opportunities for socio-political compromise, for the sake of the peaceful settlement of the conflict, I have made a personal decision to ask the Ukrainian president to accept my resignation from the post of Ukrainian prime minister". Yevhen Murayev told Dmitry Gordon that he took the fleeing Azarov out of Ukraine from Kharkiv to Belgorod during the events of Maidan. Azarov flew to Austria to join family members in a private jet hours after quitting. As of 23 February 2014 Azarov has been residing in Russia. On 29 March 2014, during a party congress, Azarov was expelled from the Party of Regions.

=== Post-resignation ===
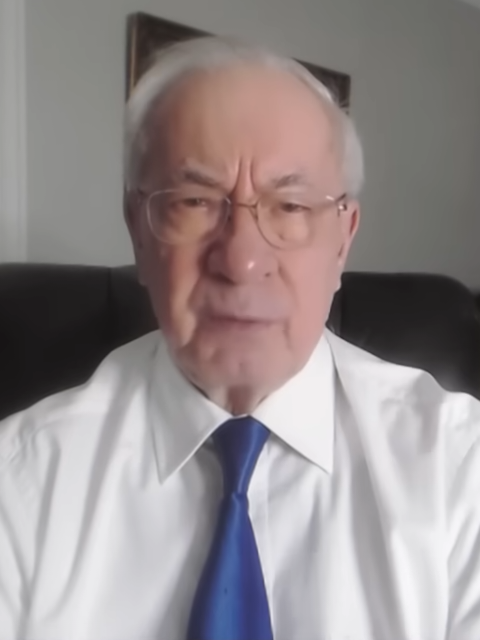
Azarov in 2025

On 3 August 2015, Azarov announced the creation of the Ukraine Salvation Committee (Russian: Комитет спасения Украины) set up outside Ukraine (in Moscow), seeking to have "all citizens, political parties, labor union and social movements to unite and restore order in our home by joint efforts" and to change Ukraine's leadership. The committee's chairman and its choice for President of Ukraine is Volodymyr Oliinyk. Azarov claimed he could not name all members of the committee because some lived in Ukraine and it would be dangerous to disclose their names.

In 2025, Mykola Azarov was elected as an academician in the Department of Earth Sciences of the Russian Academy of Sciences.

== Interpol Red Notice ==
As of 12 January 2015, Azarov has had an Interpol Red Notice issued, along with ex-President Viktor Yanukovych and former Minister of Finance Yuriy Kolobov, on charges of 'Misappropriation, embezzlement or conversion of property by malversation, if committed in respect of an especially gross amount, or by an organized group.'

Since 3 July 2014, Azarov is in the international wanted list for abuse of power.

== Family ==
Azarov's son, Oleksiy, was a constituency candidate in Sloviansk for the Party of Regions during the 2012 Ukrainian parliamentary election. He was elected into parliament.

In April 2014, Austrian authorities began an investigation of Oleksiy Azarov, among several other Ukrainians close to the former government, on money-laundering suspicions. Austrian banks reported suspicious capital flows earlier in 2014.

== Cultural and political image ==
Azarov speaks Ukrainian poorly. Still, he assured his constituents in early March 2010 that his government would be speaking Ukrainian. Nevertheless, his attempts to speak Ukrainian in public have led to the humorous term "Azirivka" for his blunders. In April 2011, he stated: "I feel one hundred percent Ukrainian". In an 11 March 2010 article the UK daily The Guardian labeled him the most Russophile member of the new cabinet. In the same article, an anonymous Ukrainian official noted, "He's extremely boring and anti-populist". A November 2010 Razumkov Centre nationwide survey showed that only 13.2 percent of respondents fully support his government while 45 percent stated they did not.

On 13 December 2012, during the parliamentary discussion of Azarov's candidacy for the Prime Minister of Ukraine, People's Deputy of Ukraine Iryna Farion publicly asked for clarification on the reason for Azarov's inability to master the state language. (Note: During the parliamentary debate Iryna Farion quoted Socrates: "Talk, and I will see you". She went on to claim: "The whole country is mastering the comicality of your speech. What can help you in this issue to learn, at least at an elementary level, the Ukrainian language? As a pedagogue with 20 years of experience, I see this problem in two aspects: the inability to learn the language shows either that the person is politically biased or mentally challenged. Thus, in which system of coordinates are you actually situated?") On that the candidate to the prime minister of Ukraine replied that he agreed to improve his Ukrainian.

== Views on society ==
Azarov had the Prime Ministerial office blessed by a priest from Kyiv Pechersk Lavra soon after he was elected prime minister in 2010. Azarov stated in March 2010 there were no female ministers in the Azarov Government because "Reforms do not fall into women's competence", while adding that he greatly respects women. After criticism from female politicians at home and abroad, Azarov explained that he meant he would not wish any woman, especially if she has children, to work more than 15 hours a day as a Ukrainian minister does. In response Ukrainian women's rights groups filed different court cases against him. Azarov stated in May 2010 that corruption was one of the biggest problems of Ukraine, "We must combat not just instances of corruption, but totally corrupt systems".

In a 22 January 2021 Facebook post on the occasion of the Day of Unity of Ukraine celebrating the 1919 symbolic unification of the Ukrainian People's Republic and the West Ukrainian People's Republic, Azarov claimed that instead, the 1939 Soviet annexation of Eastern Galicia and Volhynia should be recognized as the day Ukraine gained "the real unity of Ukraine". According to Azarov "many Ukrainians, do not know these facts, because now the Soviet period of Ukraine is smeared with black paint, and Bandera is glorified and glorified." (Note: Azarov also claimed that prior to 1939 Western Ukraine became part of the USSR "there was no industry or social infrastructure. And look at what has been created in Western Ukraine for several decades of independence.")

== See also ==
- List of fugitives from justice who disappeared

== Notes ==
Party political offices
Preceded by Valentyn Landyk	Leader of the Party of Labor; 1993–1994	Succeeded by Valentyn Landyk
New office	Leader of the Party of Regions; 2001	Succeeded by Volodymyr Semynozhenko
Preceded by Viktor Yanukovych	Leader of the Party of Regions; 2010	Succeeded by Oleksandr Yefremov
Preceded by Oleksandr Yefremov	Leader of the Party of Regions; 2010–2014	Succeeded by Borys Kolesnikov
Political offices
Preceded by Oleh Dubyna	Deputy Prime Minister of Ukraine; 2002–2005	Succeeded by Anatoliy Kinakh
Preceded by Ihor Yushko	Minister of Finance; 2002–2005	Succeeded by Viktor Pynzenyk
Preceded by Viktor Yanukovych	Prime Minister of Ukraine; Acting; 2004	Succeeded by Viktor Yanukovych
Preceded by Viktor Yanukovych	Prime Minister of Ukraine; Acting; 2005	Succeeded by Yulia Tymoshenko
Preceded by Stanislav Stashevsky	Deputy Prime Minister of Ukraine; 2006–2007	Succeeded by Oleksandr Turchynov
Preceded by Viktor Pynzenyk	Minister of Finance; 2006–2007	Succeeded by Viktor Pynzenyk
Preceded by Oleksandr Turchynov; Acting	Prime Minister of Ukraine; 2010–2014	Succeeded by Serhiy Arbuzov; Acting
