= Koladna, Kamyenyets district =

Village in Brest Region, Belarus

Koladna Коладна (Belarusian)
- Village
- Location within Belarus
- Coordinates: 52°18′35″N 23°20′50″E
- Country: Belarus
- Region: Brest Region
- District: Kamyenyets District
- Time zone: UTC+3 (MSK)

Koladna (Belarusian: Коладна; Russian: Колодно; Polish: Kołodno) is a village in Kamyenyets District, Brest Region, Belarus. It is part of Aharodniki rural council. It is located 334 kilometres (208 mi) south-west of the capital Minsk and near the border with Poland.
