= Anti-protest laws in Ukraine =

Group of laws adopted in 2014 that restricted freedom of speech & assembly in Ukraine

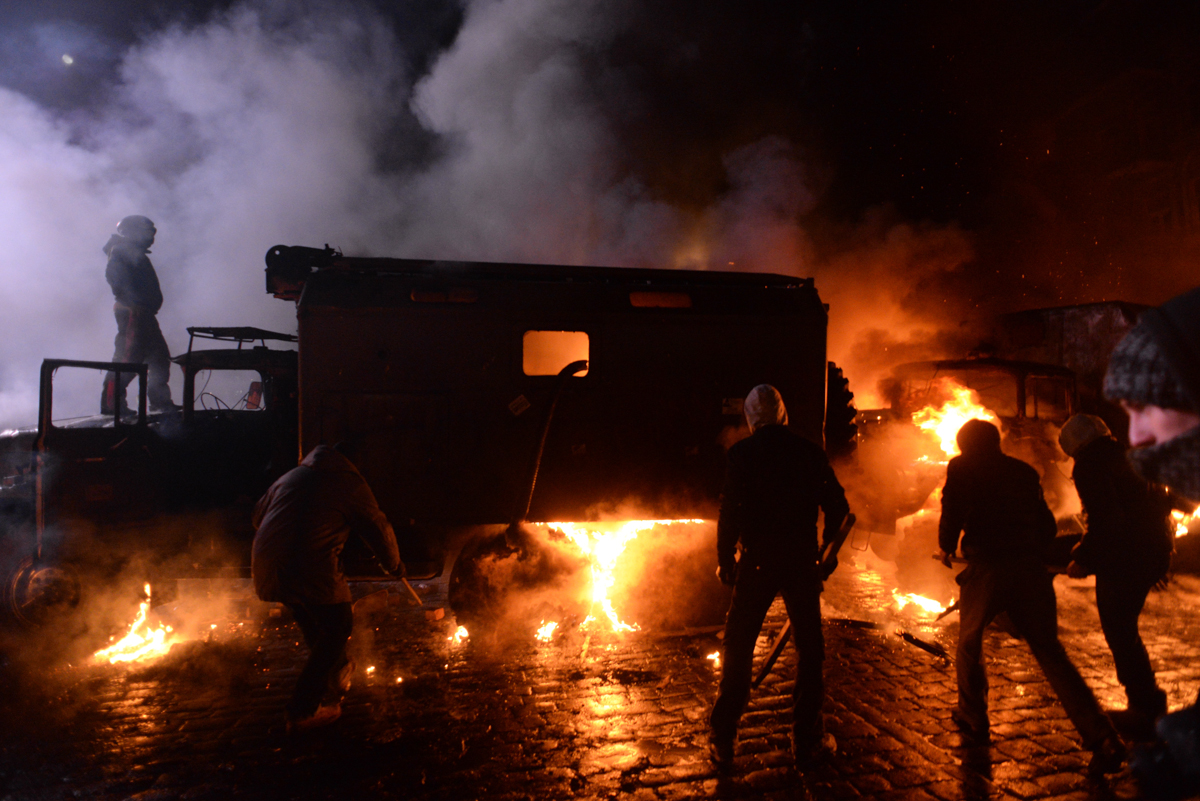
Hrushevskoho street riots in January 2014 in response to anti-protest laws.

The Ukrainian anti-protest laws were a group of ten laws restricting freedom of speech and freedom of assembly passed by the Verkhovna Rada (Parliament of Ukraine) on January 16, 2014 (referred to as Black Thursday by its opponents) and signed into law by President Viktor Yanukovych the following day, amid massive anti-government protests known as “Euromaidan” that started in November. The laws were collectively referred to as the "laws on dictatorship" (Ukrainian: закони про диктатуру, romanized: zakony pro dyktaturu, Russian: зако́ны о диктату́ре, romanized: zakony o diktature), by Euromaidan activists, non-governmental organizations, scholars, and the Ukrainian media.

In the aftermath of their passing, Western nations criticised the laws for their undemocratic nature and their ability to significantly curb the rights to protest, free speech and the activity of non-governmental organisations. They were described in the media and by experts as "draconian", with Timothy Snyder claiming that they effectively established the nation as a dictatorship. The laws were widely denounced internationally, with US Secretary of State John Kerry describing them as "anti-democratic".

The laws were developed by MPs Vadym Kolesnichenko and Volodymyr Oliinyk from the ruling Party of Regions, and supported by a voting bloc consisting of the Party of Regions, the Communist Party and some independent MPs. They were adopted with a number of procedural violations. In accordance with enforcing the new laws, Interior Minister Vitaliy Zakharchenko pledged that "each offence will be met by our side harshly."

After the laws were passed, widespread violence erupted between protesters and security forces, escalating the Euromaidan movement and resulting in the Hrushevskoho riots and then the Revolution of Dignity. As a result of the escalation the laws were causing, nine anti-protest laws were cancelled by the Verkhovna Rada on 28 January 2014.

== Procedure ==
When adopting the laws the Verkhovna Rada violated a number of its own procedural rules. The laws were voted mostly by showing of hands. This is allowed by the Rules of Procedure^{uk} but only when there is no "technical possibility" to vote through the electronic system. Moreover, hands were "counted" within a few seconds, based on the number of MPs included in the parliamentary groups, while many MPs were in fact absent. Diplomats observing the votes counted only some 100 to 140 raised hands, while the laws would have needed to be adopted by a majority of 226 votes. Most of the laws were adopted without prior consideration in the parliament's committees as required and with no time for examining the laws even by the MPs.

== Provisions ==
The laws had provisions such as:

- Criminalizing "extremist activity", which according to TI Ukraine is defined in "broad and vague terms", with a hefty fine for a first offence and up to three years in jail for a repeat offence.
- Simplifying the process of removal of parliamentary immunity during criminal proceedings to a majority vote in the Parliament. A prior review is no longer required by the Parliamentary committee.
- Extending and applying amnesty from prosecution previously adopted by the Verkhovna Rada to those who committed crimes against protestors, including Berkut security forces and other law enforcement officials;
- Allowing trial in absentia of individuals, including prison terms in cases where the person refuses to appear in court when criminal proceedings in the absence of such person are pronounced possible;
- Simplifying procedures for serving summons and filing administrative protocols;
- Creating a penalty for blocking access to residential buildings of up to six years in jail;

Traffic disruption by motorcade of more than 5 cars can be punished by a disqualification of driver's license for 1–2 years and vehicle seizure

Further provisions included:

- Drivers of motorcades of more than 5 cars, if they cause traffic jams, face the loss of their driver's license and vehicle for up to two years (unless permission is obtained from the Ministry of Internal Affairs);
- Gathering and disseminating information about the Berkut, judges, or their respective families carries a penalty of up to 2 years in jail;
- Defamation, either by means of press or social media, carries a penalty of up to one year in jail.
- Law enforcement officials involved in similar activities and their families face a maximum prison term of six months;
- The penalty for blocking government buildings is up to five years in jail; that for blocking of entrance to a residence is up to three years of restriction of liberty
- Up to 15 days in jail for unauthorised installation of tents, stages and sound equipment;
- Anti-mask law with the provision of up to 15 days in jail for participation in peaceful gatherings wearing a mask, camouflage clothing, scarf, helmet, or other means of concealing or protecting one's face or head;
- Non-governmental organizations that accept foreign funds must register as "foreign agents" and face high scrutiny and additional tax measures;
- Mandatory licensing of Internet providers;
- Provisions for legal governmental Internet censorship;
- A broad definition of "extremist activities," which disallows non-governmental organizations and churches from engaging in support of civil protests.

== Repeal ==
On January 28, the Parliament voted to repeal nine of the laws, with 361 of the 450 MPs in favor. In what The New York Times described as a compromise, the Parliament approved more limited versions of some restrictions: for example, the destruction of monuments was recriminalized, but was specified to cover only anti-fascist monuments, and not statues of Lenin.

On 25 August 2014 President Petro Poroshenko claimed he had called the 2014 Ukrainian parliamentary election in order to purify parliament of MPs who had supported "the [January 2014] Dictatorship laws that took the live of the Heavenly hundred". In this election 64 MPs (according to the Center for Political Studies and Analytics; some of these 64 MPs denied they had supported the laws) who had supported the "Dictatorship laws" were re-elected; most of them in constituencies (who had a first-past-the-post electoral system in one round (candidate with the highest vote total won)). On 11 December 2014 these 64 MPs were banned from senior parliamentary committee posts.

== Aftermath ==
On 15 February 2015 Oleksandr Yefremov was arrested for forgery of documents during the adoption of the 'anti-protest laws'. At the time of the adoption of the anti-protest laws, he was Party of Regions faction leader in the Ukrainian parliament.

== Reactions ==
=== Domestic ===
The Ukrainian opposition warned the new measures would further inflame the protest movement, and called for a big gathering in the capital Kyiv on Sunday. January 16 was dubbed Black Thursday.

On the topic of these disputed laws, jailed oppositional politician and Former Prime-Minister of Ukraine Yulia Tymoshenko said the following:

I ask the opposition and civil society to act quickly and decisively because we won't be defending the law, which Yanukovych humiliated on January 16, but the Ukrainian parliamentary system which is the final barricade before the total establishment of dictatorship. I ask the opposition to act immediately.

The Mejlis of the Crimean Tatar People denounced the laws, stating "The government has moved into an open attack on the fundamental rights and freedoms, including adopting a cynical failure of parliamentary procedures and democratic principles laws that violate the Constitution and international obligations of Ukraine, restrict the right to free assembly, free speech and the media," and warned against the use of violence in protests helping to establish the Yanukovych regime as a dictatorship.

Lviv mayor Andriy Sadovy declared the laws unconstitutional and that they would not be enforced in the city.

- Ukraine- The Ukrainian Minister of Foreign Affairs, Leonid Kozhara, noted in a statement of the Ministry that the laws "are aimed at implementing into the Ukrainian legislation a number of rules that already exist in the laws of most European countries, and comply with internationally accepted democratic standards and international practices".

=== International ===
- European Union – In a tweet on Thursday following the events in parliament, European Union Enlargement Commissioner Stefan Fuele said he was "profoundly concerned by new legislation limiting freedoms". He said the move contradicted Ukraine's "European aspirations" and its commitments in the European Union – Ukraine Association Agreement, which President Yanukovych abruptly refused to sign in November, amid Russian economic pressure^{uk}.
- United States – Secretary of State John Kerry said "the legislation that was rammed through the Rada (parliament) without transparency and accountability violates all the norms of the OSCE and the EU." He further described the laws as "anti-democratic".
- Canada - Prime Minister Stephen Harper said in a statement to reporters accompanying his diplomatic trip to the Middle East that the protests were because the Ukrainian government's actions "very much remind [Ukrainians] of their anti-democratic and Soviet past" and that his government will call for an emergency debate on the Ukrainian situation when the Parliament of Canada reconvened on 27 January 2014.

=== Non-governmental organizations ===
- Wikipedia – Announced a daily shutdown of the Ukrainian language version of the encyclopedia from January 21 onward, from 4:00 to 4:30 PM in protest of the laws. The site announced the shutdown in a declaration titled Against Censorship.

== See also ==
- Human rights in Ukraine
