= Vowchyn =

Vowchyn Воўчын (Belarusian)
- Village
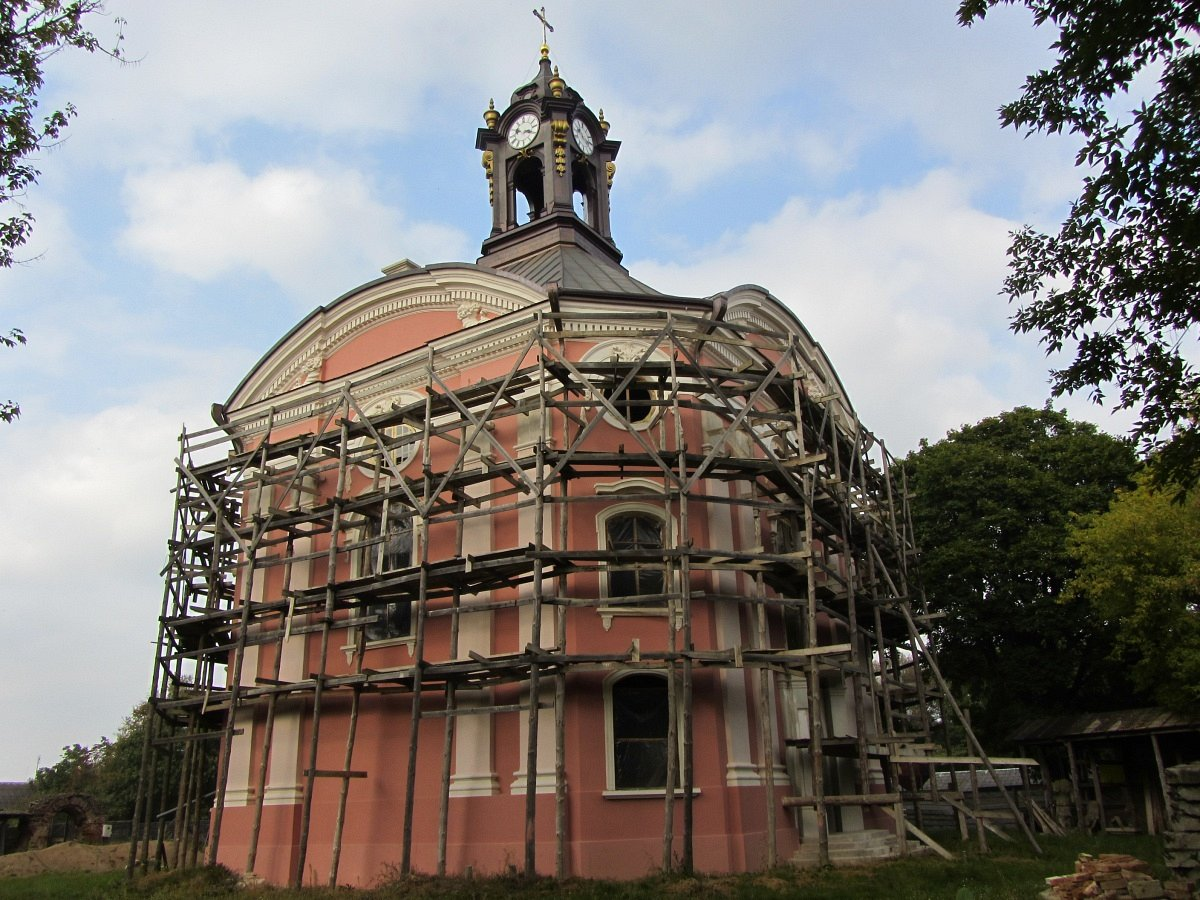
- Holy Trinity Church during renovation in 2014

- Location within Belarus
- Coordinates: 52°17′09″N 23°18′37″E
- Country: Belarus
- Region: Brest Region
- District: Kamyenyets District
- Population (2010): 508
- Area code: +375 1631

Vowchyn (Note: BGN/PCGN romanization.) (Belarusian: Во́ўчын, romanized: Voŭčyn; (Note: Official transliteration.) Russian: Во́лчин, romanized: Volchin; Ukrainian: Во́вчин, romanized: Vovchyn; Polish: Wołczyn; Lithuanian: Vaučinė) is a village in Kamyenyets District, Brest Region, Belarus. It is the birthplace of the last king of Poland, Stanisław August Poniatowski.

== History ==
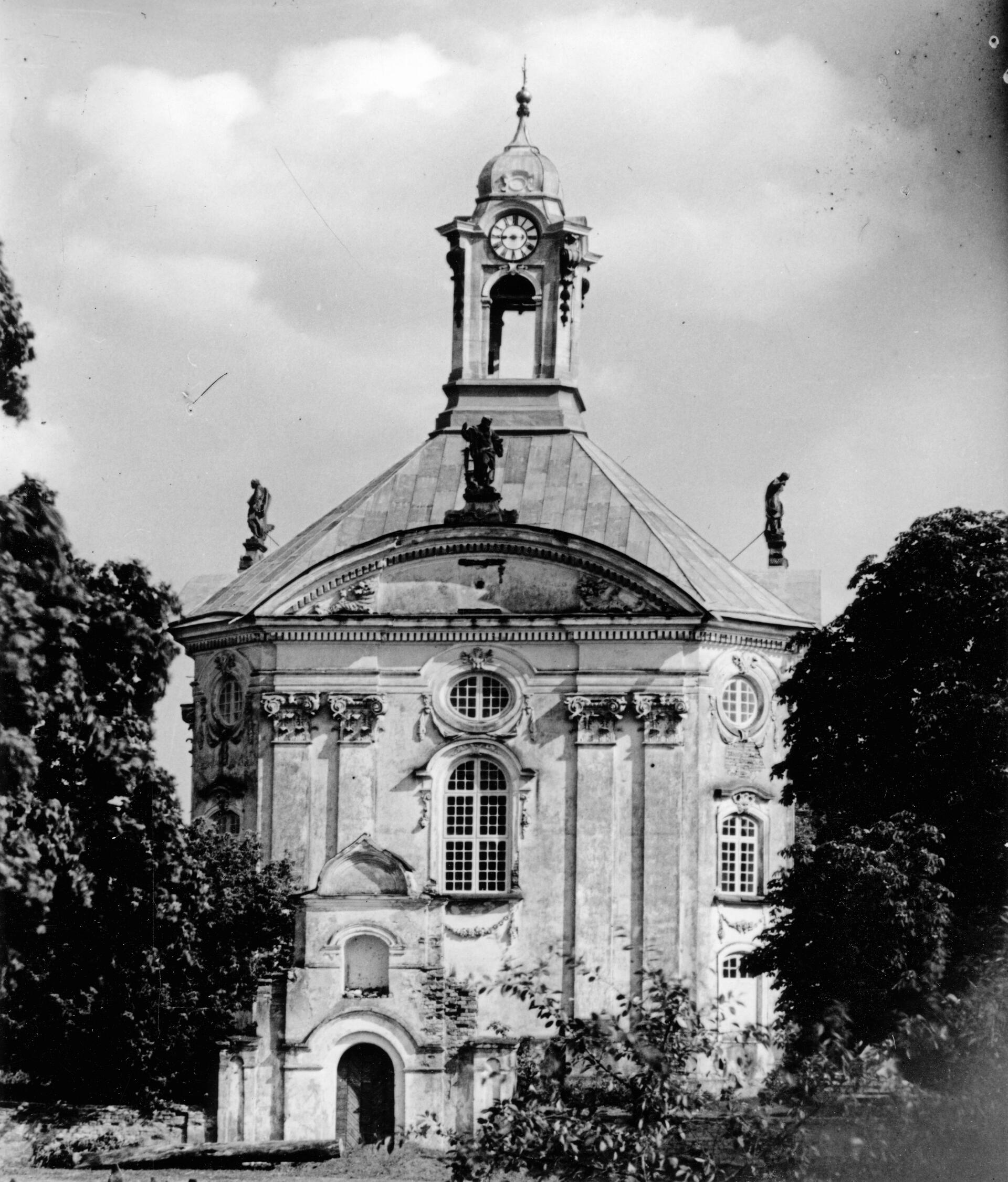
Holy Trinity Church in the 1930s

The village was mentioned in chronicles as early as the 16th century. It was a privately owned village of the Polish–Lithuanian Commonwealth. The village changed owners many times, in the 17th and 18th centuries it belonged to the Gosiewski, Sapieha, Flemming, Czartoryski and Poniatowski families. In 1720, Vowchyn came into the possession of Stanisław Poniatowski, father of the last King of Poland Stanisław August Poniatowski, born here in 1732.

In the early 18th century, a palace complex was built in Vowchyn by Prince Fryderyk Michał Czartoryski. The only standing remains is the 1729 Chapel of the Holy Trinity, which in Soviet times was used as a fertilizer warehouse. In 1761, Prince Adam Kazimierz Czartoryski and Izabela Czartoryska got married in Vowchyn.

In interwar Poland, Vowchyn was the seat of Gmina Wołczyn, located in the Brześć County, Polesie Voivodeship.

In 1938, the remains of Stanisław August Poniatowski were moved to the Holy Trinity Chapel from St. Catherine's Church in Saint Petersburg. When the town was annexed by the Soviet Union during the invasion of Poland in September 1939, the tomb was despoiled and destroyed. The church was recently renovated.

In 1995 the king's remains were moved to St. John's Cathedral in Warsaw.

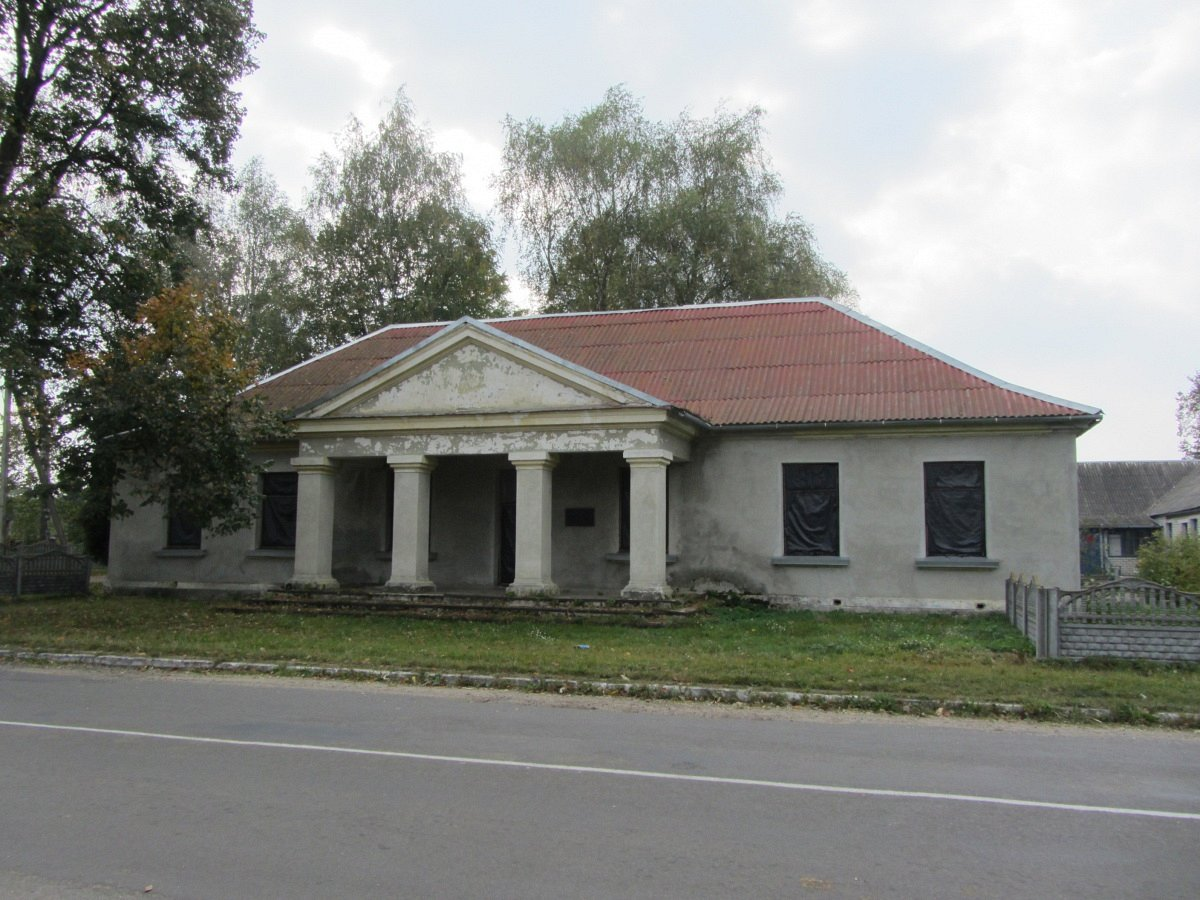
Building of the pre-war Polish gmina office

== Notable people ==
- Wincenty Korwin Gosiewski (ca.1620–1662), Polish general
- Stanisław August Poniatowski (1732–1798), last king of Poland.
- Zygmunt Vogel (1764–1826), Polish painter

== See also ==
- Vowchyn Ghetto
- Katera
