= Aharodniki =

Aharodniki Агароднікі (Belarusian)
- Agrotown
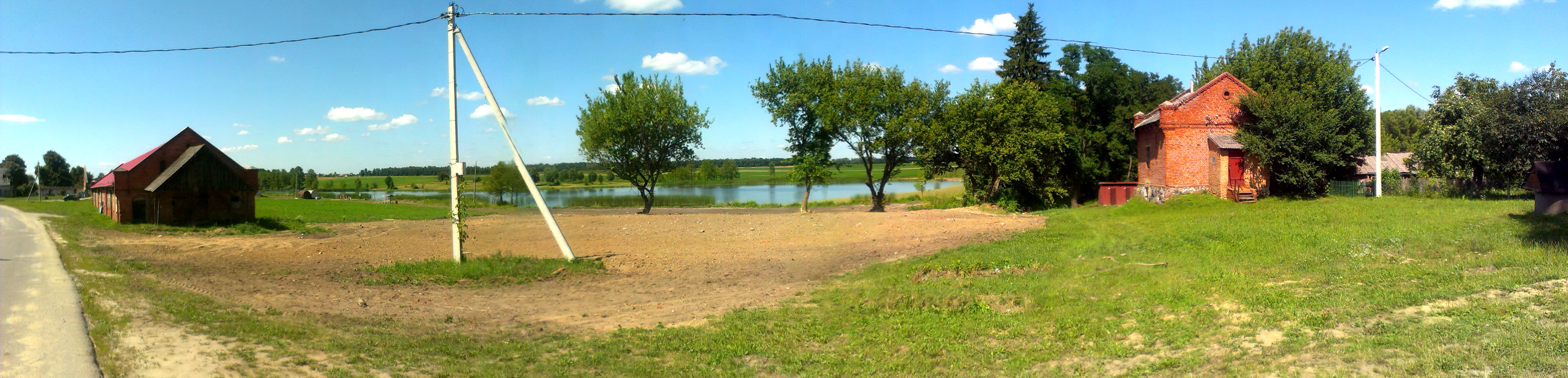

- Location within Belarus
- Coordinates: 52°20′49″N 23°20′42″E
- Country: Belarus
- Region: Brest Region
- District: Kamyenyets District
- Time zone: UTC+3 (MSK)

Aharodniki (Belarusian: Агароднікі; Russian: Огородники, romanized: Ogorodniki; Polish: Ogrodniki) is an agrotown in Kamyenyets District, Brest Region, Belarus. It serves as the administrative center of Aharodniki rural council. It is located 338 kilometres (210 mi) south of the capital Minsk.
