= Ihor Markov =

Former Ukrainian politician (born 1973)

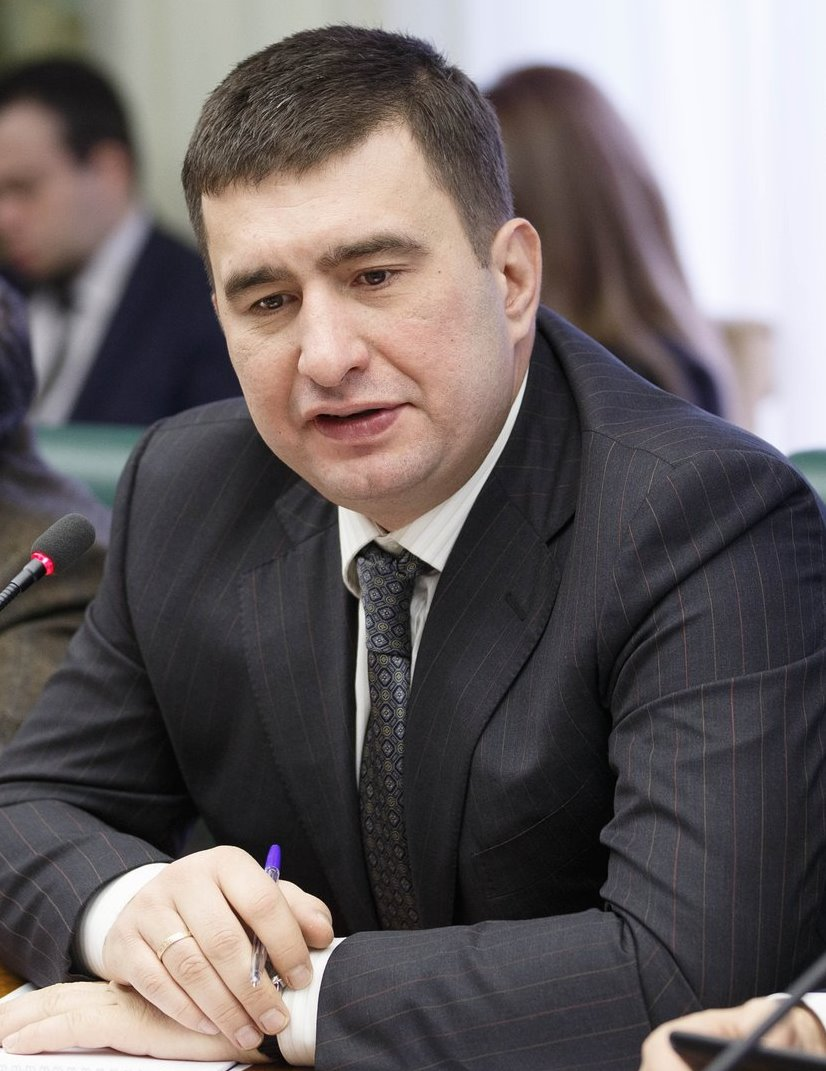
Markov in 2014

Ihor Olehovych Markov (Ukrainian: Ігор Олегович Марков; Russian: Игорь Олегович Марков, romanized: Igor Olegovich Markov; born on 18 January 1973) is a former pro-Russian Ukrainian entrepreneur, founder and chairman of the Rodina Party and is a former deputy of Ukrainian parliament as a member of the Party of Regions faction. Markov is wanted in Ukraine in connection with riots in Odesa that took place on 2 September 2007. He was arrested in Italy's Sanremo in August 2015. In February 2016 Italy refused Markov's extradition to Ukraine.

== Biography ==
Markov was born in Odesa and graduated there from the Odesa Institute of Marine Engineering (degree in economics and business) and the Odesa State Economic University, majoring in banking. From 1991 he has a business career in oil, media and design of housing companies (some of them founded by him).

Markov began political activity in the Labour Ukraine for which he was a member of the Odesa City Council. In the 2006 Ukrainian local elections, he was elected to the Odesa City Council on the lists of the People's Opposition Bloc of Natalia Vitrenko. But then formed his own parliamentary group for the by him created Rodina Party.

On 2 September 2007 Markov — along with associates — beat up picketers who were protesting against raising of the monument of the Russian empress Catherine II in Odesa.

During the 28 October 2012 Ukrainian parliamentary election Markov (officially registered as an independent candidate) won single-member constituency No. 133 (Kyivsky Raion in Odesa), collecting 26.6% of the vote. Markov was over 6% ahead of his main rival, Party of Regions candidate Honcharenko. And thus Markov was elected into the Verkhovna Rada (Ukraine's parliament). Police officers had documented the use of pens with disappearing ink in at least 40 polling stations in constituency No. 133 on 28 October 2012. Markov joined the Party of Regions faction in the Verkhovna Rada.

On 12 September 2013 the Higher Administrative Court of Ukraine (under a lawsuit lodged by Yuriy Karmazin) ruled it impossible to reliably establish the results of the 28 October 2012 elections in constituency No. 133. The court overturned the Central Election Commission of Ukraine (CEC) decision of 23 November 2012 regarding Markov's registration as a People's Deputy of Ukraine and ordered the CEC to take measures to organize, prepare for and hold repeat elections in constituency No. 133. Markov left the Party of Regions faction on 17 September 2013. In the Ukrainian press he accused his former faction of tapping phones, bullied its members into voting and paying $5,000 monthly (Note: Morkov added that Party of Regions deputies who deliver speeches in parliament received an extra $5,000.) to its members for voting how they are told. Markov "felt" that the court ruling that stripped him off a seat in parliament was retaliation against his independent position in the Party of Regions and his refusal to be bullied into voting how he was told. Oleksandr Yefremov, Markov's former Party of Regions faction leader, refuted the accusations.

Markov was detained in Odesa on 22 October 2013 after as a suspect of orchestrating the assault and of attacking protesters himself during the 2 September 2007 riots. On 25 February 2014 an Odesa Court freed Markov from custody.

On 24 February 2014 the Chairman of the Verkhovna Rada Oleksandr Turchynov quashed the order of his predecessor Volodymyr Rybak, and returned Markov status of People's Deputy of Ukraine.

Markov did not participate in the 26 October 2014 Ukrainian parliamentary election.

On 24 December 2014 the Ukrainian Interior Ministry again placed Markov on its wanted list in connection with the 2 September 2007 riots. It claimed Markov had disappeared on 4 November 2014. Markov then became a frequently guest on Russian television, where he criticized Ukrainian authorities.

Markov is co-founder and director of pro-Russian public organizations. Markov wants to transform Ukraine from its current presidential republic into a parliamentary republic.

On 3 August 2015 Markov joined the Moscow based "Ukraine Salvation Committee" led by former Prime Minister of Ukraine Mykola Azarov (who is also a former member of the Party of Regions). Markov was arrested in Italy's Sanremo on 12 August 2015. In February 2016 Italy refused Markov's extradition to Ukraine; claiming his arrest warrant was politically motivated.

In 2022, during the early stages of the Russo-Ukrainian war, Markov founded the pro-russian paramilitary unit "Odessa Brigade".
