= Ukraine Salvation Committee =

Russian-backed Ukrainian political organization

- Ukrainian: Комітет спасіння України; Russian: Комитет спасения Украины
- Flag of Ukraine Logo

Overview
- Established: 29 July 2015
- State: Ukraine
- Leader: Mykola Azarov
- Headquarters: Moscow, Russia (in exile)
- Website: https://comitet.su/

The Ukraine Salvation Committee (Ukrainian: Комітет спасіння України, romanized: Komitet spasinnia Ukrainy; Russian: Комитет спасения Украины, romanized: Komitet spaseniya Ukrainy) is a Russia-backed initiative by former high-ranking Ukrainian officials from the Viktor Yanukovych administration, that claims to be a government in exile for Ukraine. The headquarters of the Ukraine Salvation Committee is located in Moscow, Russia.

== Creation ==
In February 2015, former prime minister of Ukraine Mykola Azarov announced his intention to a create a Ukrainian "government in exile". The official announcement that the organization had been created came on 29 July from Azarov's representatives.

On 3 August 2015 in Moscow, in Hotel Ukraina, a press conference was held by Azarov, who was now head of the committee, along with other former people's deputies Volodymyr Oliinyk and Ihor Markov. Azarov announced the creation of the Committee for the Salvation of Ukraine, along with his reasonings for doing so and the position of the committee regarding the political situation.

== Membership and structure ==
The Ukraine Salvation Committee has emerged as a platform for former high-ranking Ukrainian officials from the Viktor Yanukovych administration, who moved to Russia in late 2013 and early 2014 during and following the Revolution of Dignity that ousted Yanukovych. Many of the members are under sanctions from Western countries or have arrest warrants in Ukraine or other countries.

In addition to Azarov, Oliynyk and Markov, the committee includes former Ukrainian parliamentarian Oleg Tsaryov, and Yury Kot.

Azarov has called himself the "shadow prime minister of Ukraine", and Oliynik the "probable presidential candidate".

The committee is financed by Ukrainian oligarch Serhiy Kurchenko.

Members

- Mykola Azarov (Chair)
- Ihor Markov
- Volodymyr Oliinyk
- Yury Kot

== Positions ==
At the 3 August 2015 press conference, Azarov announced his vision for the key positions of the committee, stating how he wanted to bring Ukraine out of "crisis". He called the post-revolution government a "junta", and recommended to stop resisting Russia and stop moving towards a Western alignment. Azarov also spoke in favor of regionalism in Ukraine, and making the Russian language official on a federal level. The committee uses common Russian propaganda tropes.

== Reactions ==
The committee has been featured prominently in propaganda from Russian state media.

The Russian government claimed that it had nothing to do with the creation of the group.

Ukrainian and Russian opposition outlets have mainly dismissed the group as Russian puppets.

== Legal prosecution ==
Ihor Markov, was detained on 12 August 2015 in Sanremo, Italy, at the request of Ukrainian law enforcement. The committee protested his arrest and called on Italy and Interpol to release Markov. Italy eventually refused to extradite Markov to Ukraine, citing perceived political motives for the request.

The General Prosecutor's Office of Ukraine has designated the creation of the committee as criminal, as per laws prohibiting calling for the overthrowing of the Ukrainian government on mass media. The investigation is ongoing.

The Committee initiated a case in the Moscow District Court seeking for Russia to recognize the Revolution of Dignity as a coup, which was successful. Ukrainian authorities have said such actions are legally void.

== Sanctions ==
In September 2016, the United States Department of Commerce sanctioned the committee as part of an expansion of sanctions on organizations involved in the war in Donbas. This means that the committee and Azarov himself cannot have any commercial relations with American citizens or residents, and any of their money, if under American control, will be frozen.

== See also ==
- First Azarov government
- Second Azarov government
