= Katera, Belarus =

Village in Brest Region, Belarus

Katera Катэра (Belarusian)
- Village
- Location within Belarus
- Coordinates: 52°17′0″N 23°18′0″E
- Country: Belarus
- Region: Brest Region
- District: Kamyenyets District
- Time zone: UTC+3 (MSK)

Katera (Belarusian: Катэра; Russian: Катера; Polish: Kotera) is a village in Kamyenyets District, Brest Region, Belarus. It is part of Vowchyn selsovet. It is located 336 kilometres (209 mi) south of the capital Minsk and near the border with Poland.
