= Rasna, Brest region =

Rasna Расна (Belarusian)
- Agrotown
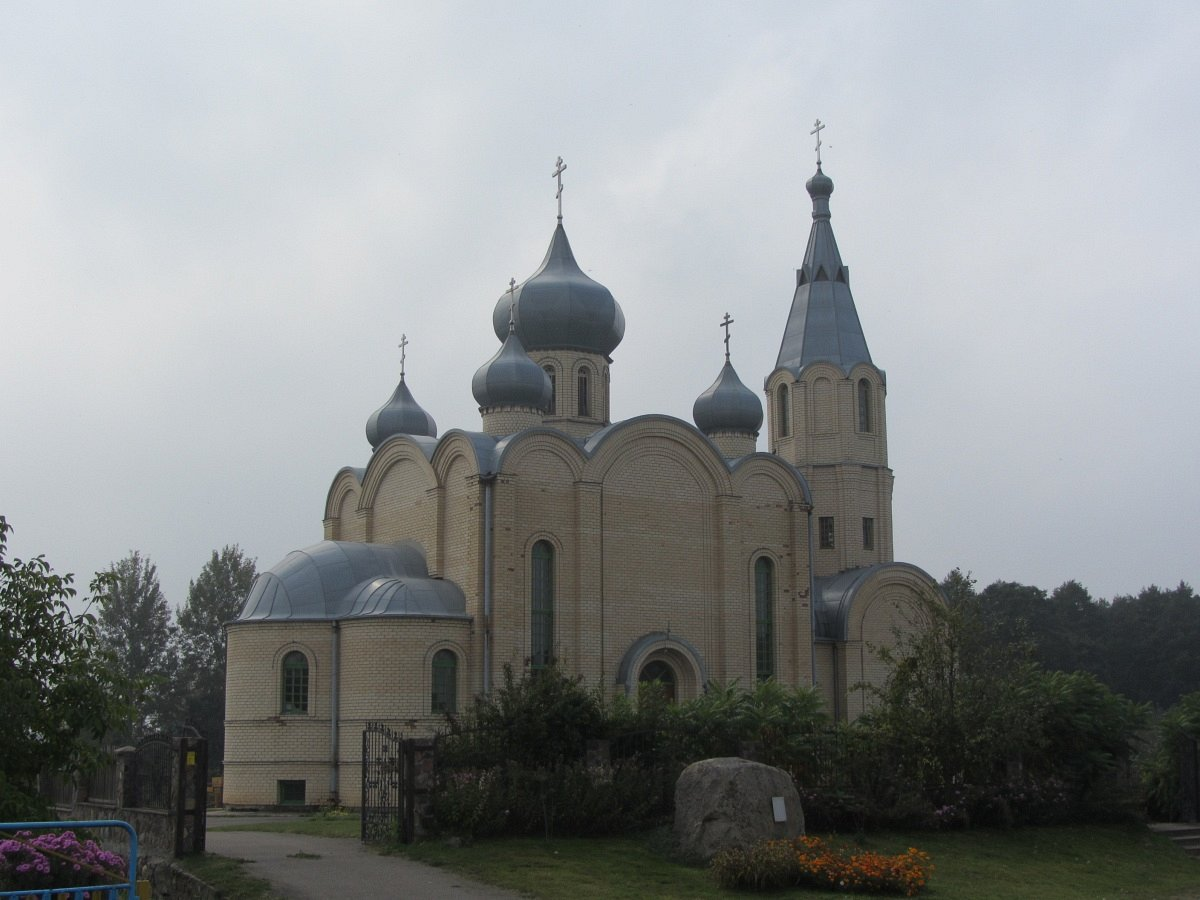

- Location within Belarus
- Coordinates: 52°23′27″N 23°24′39″E
- Country: Belarus
- Region: Brest Region
- District: Kamyenyets District
- Time zone: UTC+3 (MSK)

Rasna (Belarusian: Расна; Russian: Рясна, romanized: Ryasna) is an agrotown in Kamyenyets District, Brest Region, Belarus. It serves as the administrative center of Rasna rural council (selsoviet). It is located close to the border with Poland.
