= Volodymyr Oliinyk =

Ukrainian politician

- Володимир Олійник
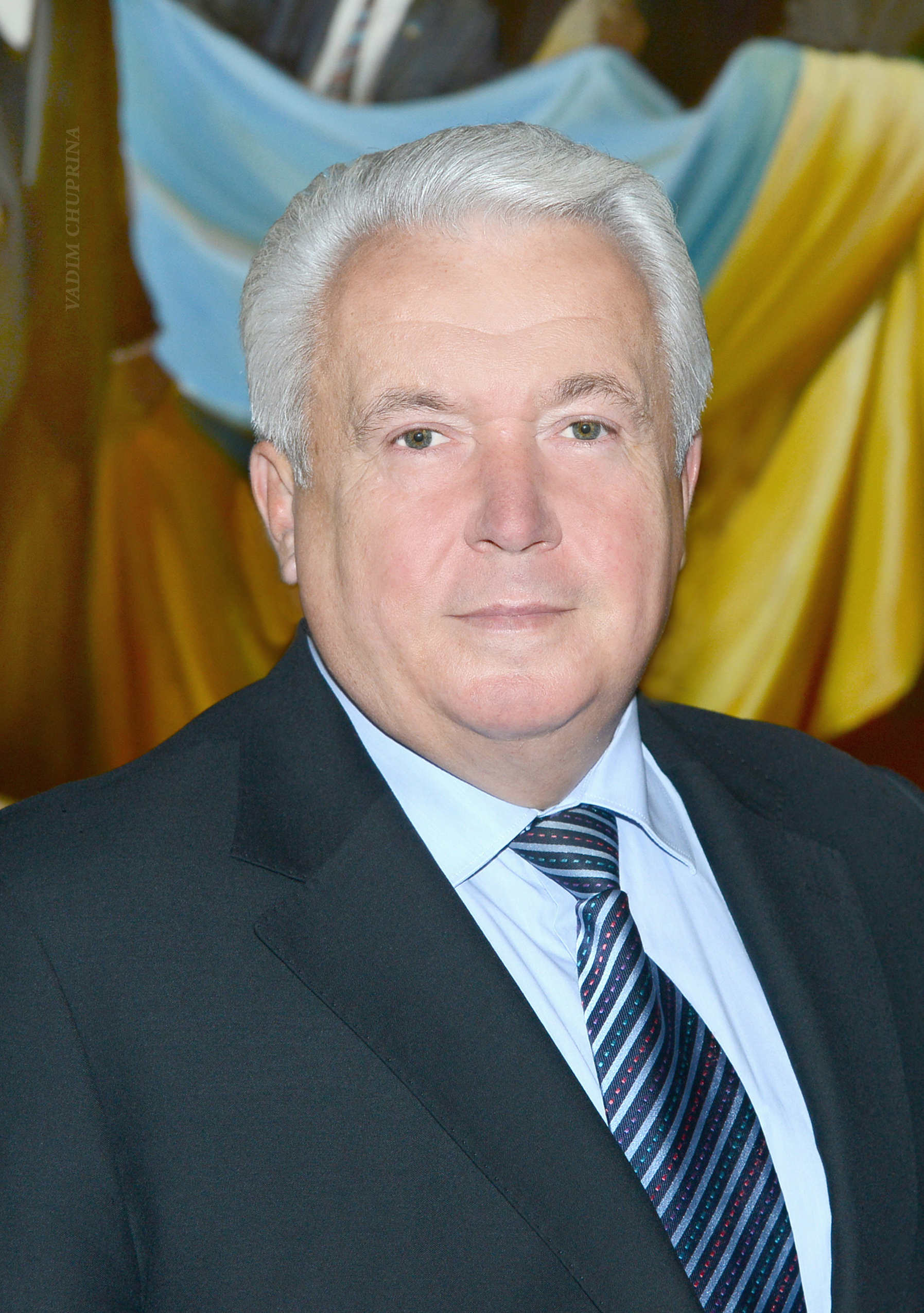
- Oliinyk in 2013

People's Deputy of Ukraine
- In office 22 March 2010 – 27 October 2014
- Constituency: Party of Regions, No. 185 (2010–2012); Party of Regions, No. 17 (2012–2014)
- In office 25 May 2006 – 23 November 2007
- Constituency: Yulia Tymoshenko Bloc, No. 30

Mayor of Cherkasy
- In office 1994–2000

Personal details
- Born: 16 April 1957 (age 69) Buzivka, Cherkasy Oblast, Ukrainian SSR, Soviet Union (now Ukraine)
- Party: Party of Regions (from 2007)
- Other political affiliations: Republican Platform; Yulia Tymoshenko Bloc; For Peace and Stability (2014); Communist Party of Ukraine (until 1991)
- Education: Kharkiv Law Institute

Military service
- Allegiance: Soviet Union
- Branch/service: Soviet Army
- Years of service: 1975–1977

Volodymyr Mykolaiovych Oliinyk (Ukrainian: Володи́мир Миколайович Олі́йник; born 16 April 1957) is a former Ukrainian politician who served as a People's Deputy of Ukraine from 2006 to 2014. He previously served as mayor of Cherkasy from 1994 to 2002 and was a candidate in the 1999 Ukrainian presidential election. Oliinyk was the author of the anti-protest laws and fled Ukraine after the Revolution of Dignity, serving as president of the Moscow-based Ukraine Salvation Committee.

== Early life and career, family ==
Volodymyr Mykolaiovych Oliinyk was born on 16 April 1957 in the village of Buzivka, Cherkasy Oblast. He served in the Soviet Army from 1975 to 1977 and subsequently studied at the Kharkiv Law Institute (now the Yaroslav Mudryi National Law University), graduating in 1981. Following his graduation, Oliinyk worked as a judge in the city of Cherkasy.

Oliinyk is married to Liudmyla Hennadiivna Oliinyk. The couple has three sons: Ruslan, Denys and Volodymyr.

== Political career ==
From 1987 to 1988, Oliinyk was a member of the Cherkasy municipal committee of the Communist Party of Ukraine. He subsequently served as a member of the Cherkasy regional committee from 1988 to 1990, and was deputy mayor of the Cherkasy municipal executive committee from 1990 to 1994. He became mayor of Cherkasy in 1994, holding the position until 2002.

Oliinyk ran in the 1999 Ukrainian presidential election as an independent candidate. He was part of the Kaniv Four, a coalition of candidates opposed to Leonid Kuchma who pledged to drop out in favour of the most popular polled candidate. Alongside Oleksandr Tkachenko Oliinyk withdrew from the race, endorsing Yevhen Marchuk.

Oliinyk was an unsuccessful candidate in the 2002 Ukrainian parliamentary election, running in the 200th electoral district for the Ukrainian Republican Party "Sobor" (now the Republican Platform). He was a supporter of the Orange Revolution and in one instance addressed protesters, referring to the government as zeks and calling for their removal. A video of Oliinyk speaking during the Orange Revolution circulated online during Euromaidan.

In the 2006 Ukrainian parliamentary election Oliinyk was elected as a People's Deputy of Ukraine for the Yulia Tymoshenko Bloc, placed 30th on the party's proportional representation party list.

Oliinyk returned to the Verkhovna Rada (parliament of Ukraine) on 30 March 2010 as the 185th candidate on the PR party list of the Party of Regions. He was re-elected in the 2012 Ukrainian parliamentary election, this time as the 17th candidate on the Party of Regions' PR party list. He was deputy chairman of the Committee on Legal Defence of Human Rights Activities.

Transparency-focused non-governmental organisation Chesno has accused Oliinyk of engaging in piano voting while in office, as well as being absent from more than 25% of sessions during his time in office.

=== Euromaidan and aftermath ===
Oliinyk, alongside Vadym Kolesnichenko, was co-author of the anti-protest laws during Euromaidan. He left the Party of Regions group on 3 June 2014. Oliinyk was leader of the For Peace and Stability, a group in the Verkhovna Rada, and advocated for an end to the war in Donbas and the restoration of diplomatic relations with Russia. By December 2014, he had fled Ukraine to Russia, living in Moscow and Yalta in Russian-occupied Crimea. Upon being approached by news outlet Television News Service, he described the post-Revolution of Dignity government as a "junta".

Oliinyk was appointed president of the Moscow-based Ukraine Salvation Committee on 3 August 2015.

== Sanctions and criminal charges ==
Oliinyk was declared persona non grata by the government of the United States in January 2014 alongside other pro-government People's Deputies in response to violence against protesters during Euromaidan. He was stripped of his diplomatic passport by the Ministry of Foreign Affairs in August 2015 alongside 89 other politicians who had supported Yanukovych's government.

In January 2022, Oliinyk was sanctioned by the U.S. Treasury Department and accused of being part of a group led by Oleh Voloshyn and Taras Kozak, working on behalf of the Russian Federal Security Service to destabilise the Ukrainian government. The U.S. Treasury stated that Oliinyk had gathered information about Ukraine's critical infrastructure for Russian intelligence.

Along with fellow former People's Deputy Oleg Tsaryov, Oliinyk was charged with treason by the Security Service of Ukraine (Ukrainian: Служба безпеки України, romanized: Sluzhba bezpeky Ukrainy, SBU) in September 2022. The SBU accused Oliinyk and Tsaryov of participating in the Russian occupation of Kyiv Oblast, travelling to the village of Katiuzhanka and advocating for the Russian world.
