= Stanislav Stashevsky =

Ukrainian politician

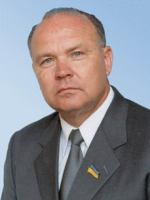

Stanislav Stashevsky (ukr. Станісла́в Телі́сфорович Сташе́вський, born 10 March 1943) is a Ukrainian politician and statesman. People's Deputy of Ukraine of the 4th and 5th convocations. Candidate of Technical Sciences (since 1999).

In 1972 graduated from Kyiv Polytechnic Institute with a degree in electrical engineering. Candidate's dissertation "Organization of urban construction in market conditions (on the example of housing construction in Kyiv)" (Kyiv National University of Construction and Architecture, 1999)

October 1996 - March 2001 - First Deputy Head of the Kyiv City State Administration. Chairman of the Commission on Investment Activities in the City of Kyiv. He headed the work on the development of a new General Plan of the city of Kyiv.

March 6 - November 19, 2001 - Minister of Fuel and Energy of Ukraine.

In 2002-2005 - People's Deputy of Ukraine

September 27, 2005 - August 4, 2006 - First Vice Prime Minister of Ukraine

Since February 2006 - Representative of Ukraine in the Common Economic Space.

In 2006-2007 - People's Deputy of Ukraine
