= Řásná =

- Municipality
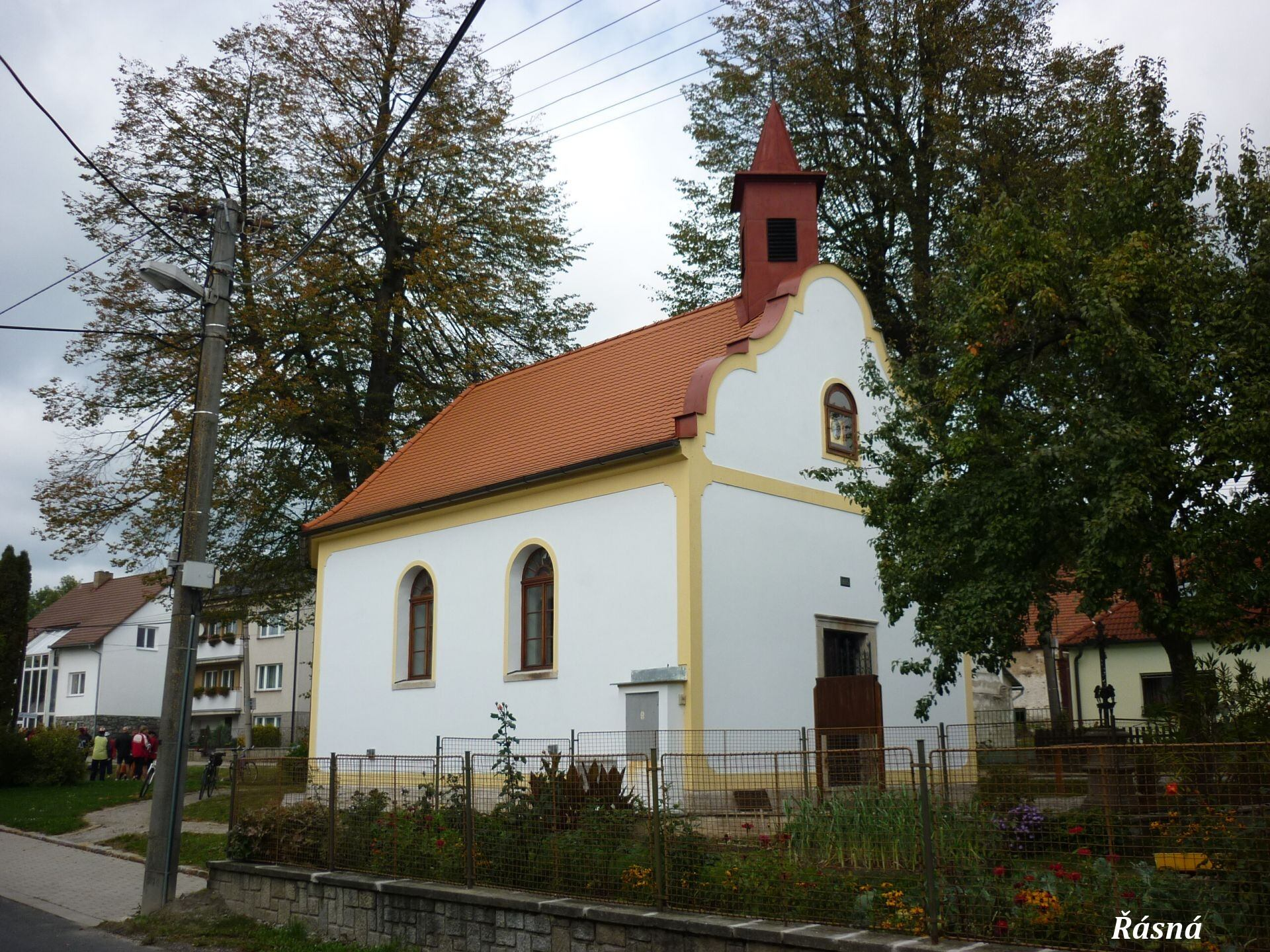
- Chapel of Saint Cyril and Methodius

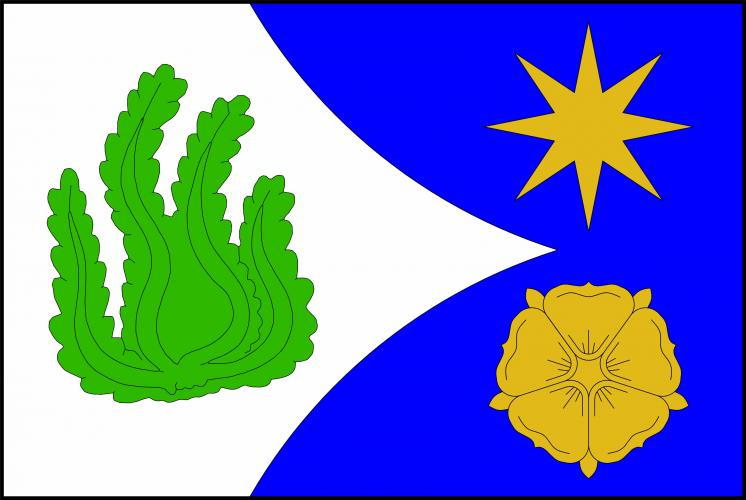
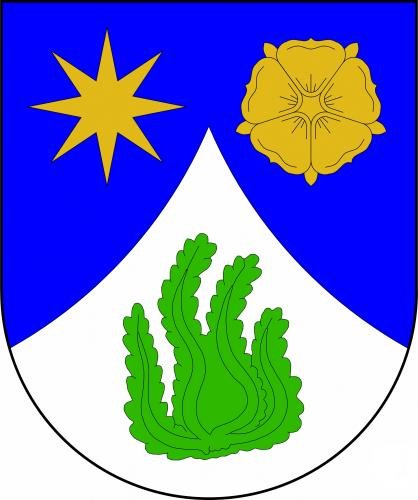
- Flag Coat of arms

- Location in the Czech Republic
- Coordinates: 49°13′16″N 15°23′29″E
- Country: Czech Republic
- Region: Vysočina
- District: Jihlava
- First mentioned: 1385

Area
  - Total: 13.52 km^{2} (5.22 sq mi)
- Elevation: 621 m (2,037 ft)

Population (2026-01-01)
  - Total: 297
  - Density: 22.0/km^{2} (56.9/sq mi)
- Time zone: UTC+1 (CET)
  - Summer (DST): UTC+2 (CEST)
- Postal code: 588 56
- Website: www.rasna.cz

Řásná (Czech pronunciation: [ˈr̝aːsnaː]) is a municipality and village in Jihlava District in the Vysočina Region of the Czech Republic. It has about 300 inhabitants.

Řásná lies approximately 24 kilometres (15 mi) south-west of Jihlava and 118 km (73 mi) south-east of Prague.

== Demographics ==
Historical population
Year	Pop.	±%
1869	273	—
1880	286	+4.8%
1890	303	+5.9%
1900	291	−4.0%
1910	286	−1.7%
1921	274	−4.2%
1930	314	+14.6%
1950	242	−22.9%
1961	257	+6.2%
1970	243	−5.4%
1980	208	−14.4%
1991	181	−13.0%
2001	200	+10.5%
2011	187	−6.5%
2021	236	+26.2%
Source: Censuses
