= Kamyenyets district =

District of Brest region, Belarus

Kamyenyets district Камянецкі раён (Belarusian) Каменецкий район (Russian)
- District
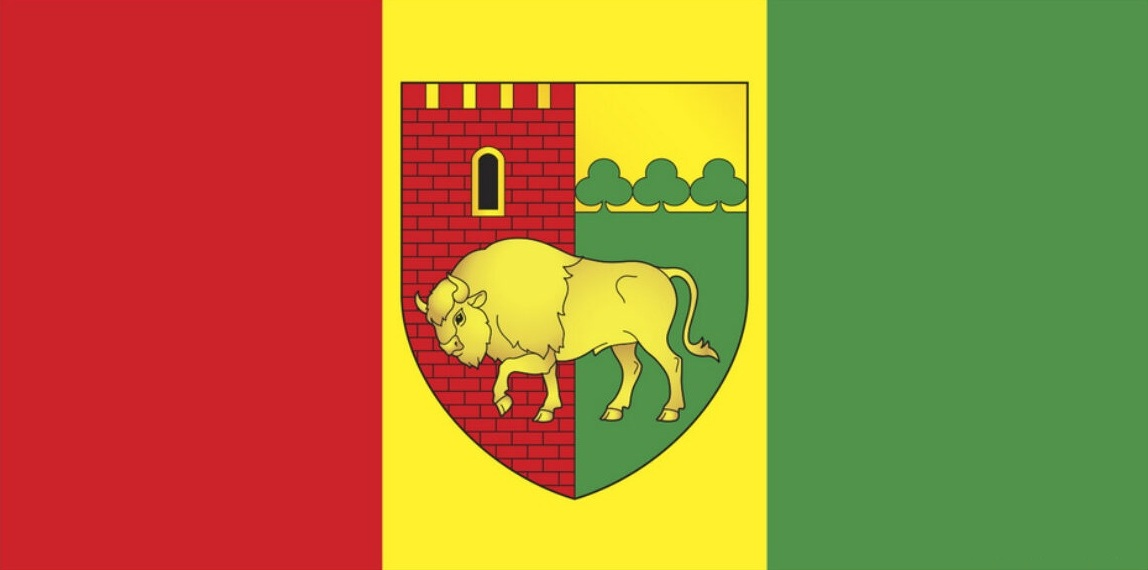
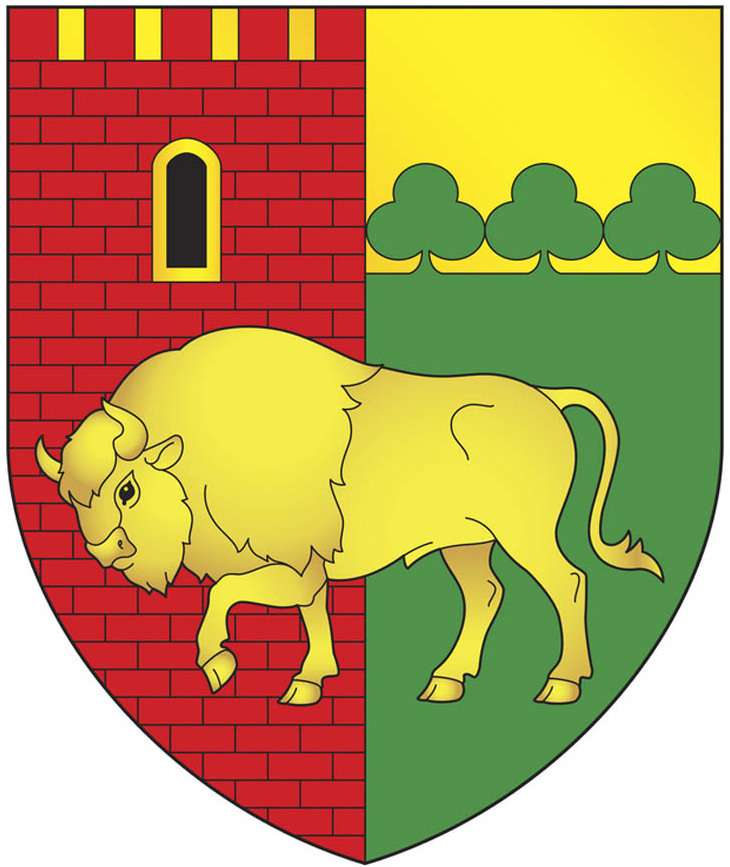
- Flag Coat of arms

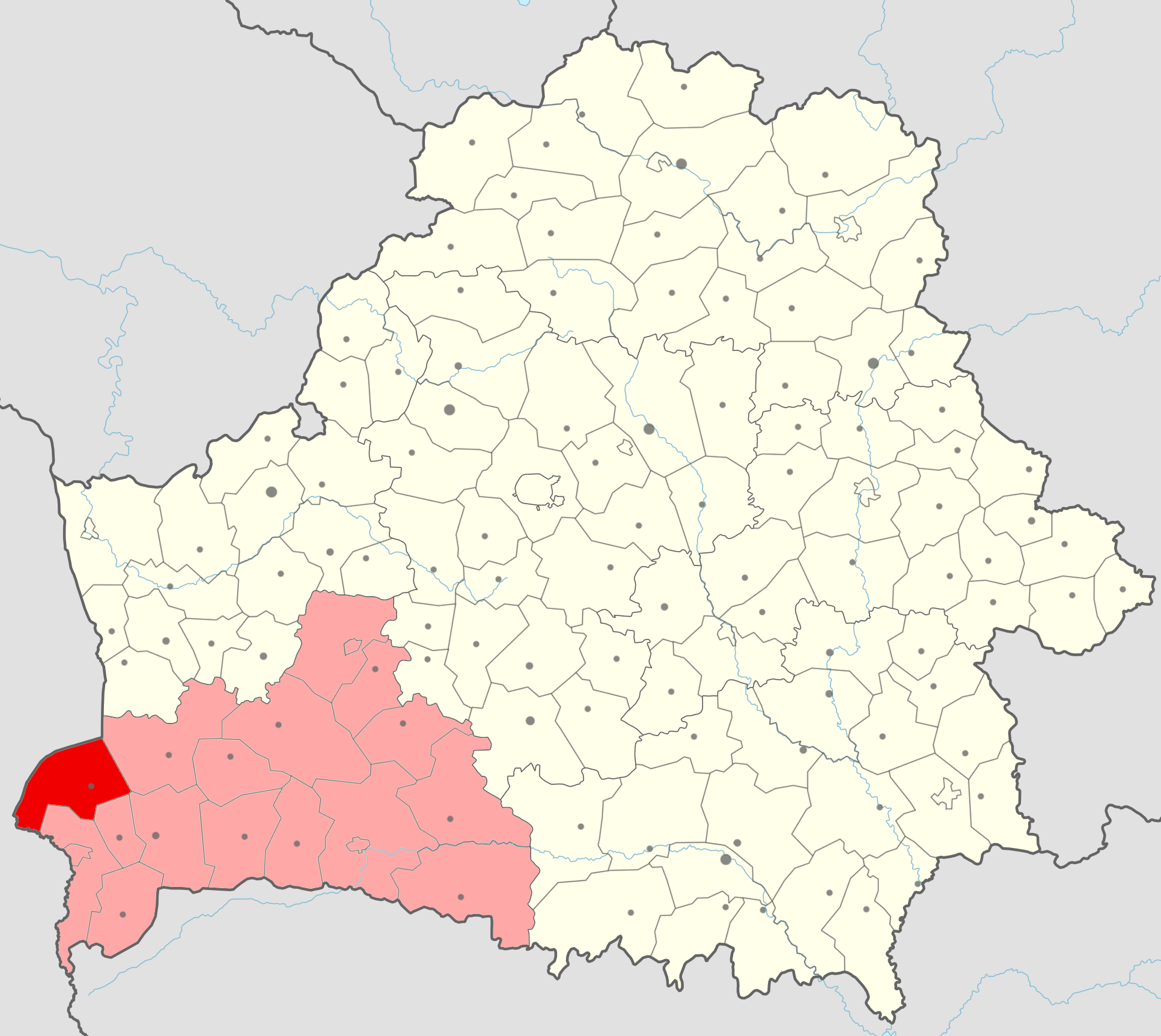
- Coordinates: 52°23′20″N 23°48′46″E
- Country: Belarus
- Region: Brest region
- Administrative center: Kamyenyets

Area
  - District: 1,705.32 km^{2} (658.43 sq mi)

Population (2024)
  - District: 31,088
  - Density: 18.230/km^{2} (47.216/sq mi)
  - Urban: 13,200
  - Rural: 17,888
- Time zone: UTC+3 (MSK)
- Website: kamenec.brest-region.gov.by

Kamyenyets district or Kamieniec district (Belarusian: Камянецкі раён; Russian: Каменецкий район) is a district (raion) of Brest region in Belarus. Its administrative center is Kamyenyets. As of 2024, it has a population of 31,088.

== Geography ==
The westernmost point of Belarus is situated in Kamyenyets District, a few kilometers southwest from Vysokaye on the Bug River.

== Demographics ==
At the time of the 2009 Belarusian census, Kamyenyets district had a population of 39,143. Of these, 83.2% were of Belarusian, 7.4% Ukrainian, 6.7% Russian and 1.7% Polish ethnicity. 52.1% spoke Russian and 43.0% Belarusian as their native language. In 2023, it had a population of 31,476.

== Notable residents ==
- Usievalad Ihnatoŭski (1881, Takary village - 1931), Belarusian politician, scholar and the first president of the National Academy of Sciences of Belarus
- Romuald Traugutt (1826, Šastakova village – 1864), general and war hero best known for commanding the January Uprising of 1863
