= Organic market in Ukraine =

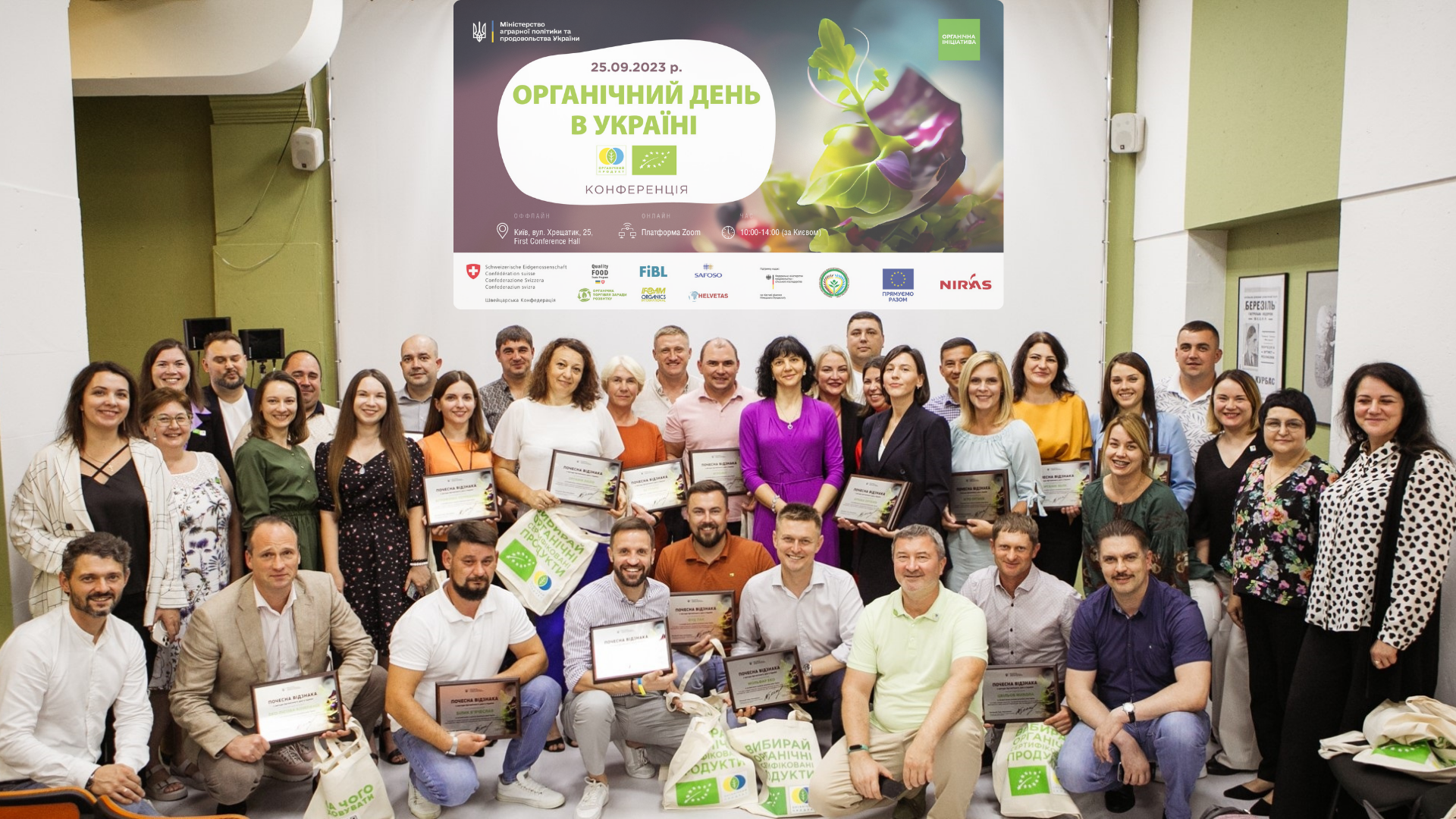
Certified operators and participants of the organic sector of Ukraine at the conference "Organic Day in Ukraine", 25 September 2023

The organic market in Ukraine is a segment of the economy aimed at the production, circulation and consumption of organic products. The organic market in Ukraine includes the cultivation, production and/or circulation of various agri-food products in accordance with the organic production standards established by Ukrainian and/or international legislation. This market is an important segment of the Ukrainian agriculture and consumer market, which contributes to the preservation of the environment, maintenance of soil, plant, animal and human health, and development of sustainable agriculture.

== Domestic market ==
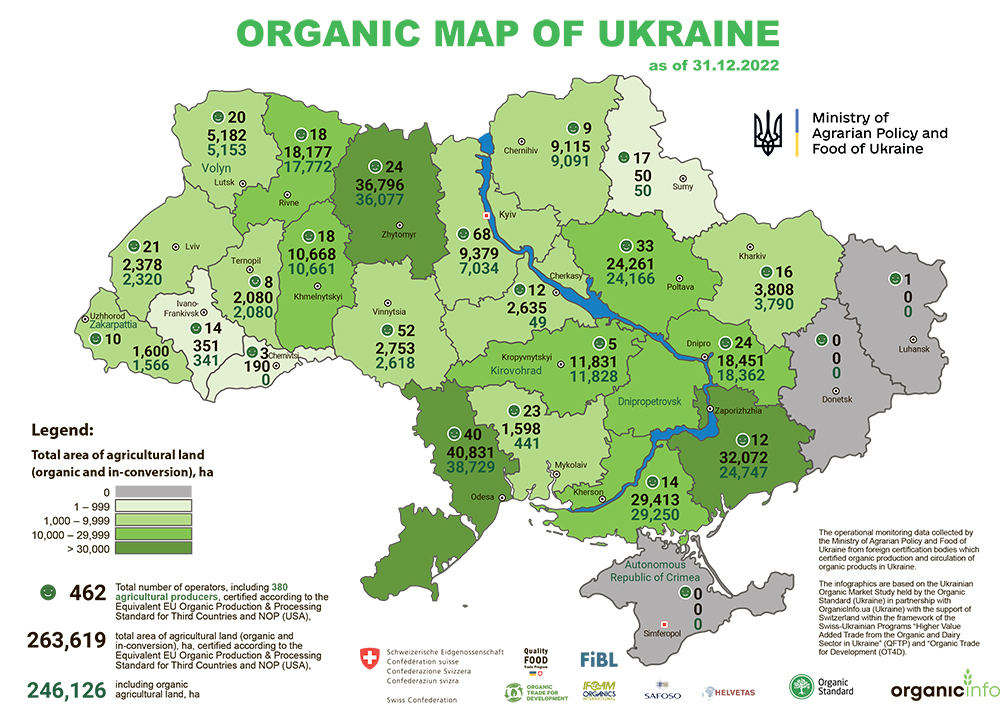
Organic map of Ukraine 2022

In Ukraine, as of 31 December 2022, the total area of agricultural land under organic production and in-conversion is 263,619 hectares (0.6% of the total area of agricultural land in Ukraine), including the area of organic agricultural land – 246,126 hectares, the area of agricultural land in-conversion – 17,493 hectares. The total number of operators is 462, including 380 agricultural producers.

In recent years, before 24 February 2022, the domestic market increased in sales and the range of organic products continued to expand.

Due to Russia's full-scale military invasion of Ukraine, domestic sales of Ukrainian organic products decreased by 36% in volume (6,280 tons) and 48% in value (about US$17 million) in 2022 compared to 2021.

Ukrainian organic products on the domestic market include milk and dairy products, vegetables, fruits and mushrooms, cereals and groats, flour, seeds, snacks, eggs, meat products, juices, beverages, pastes, canned products, oils, condiments and spices, sugar and other products, including bakery products, varenyky (dumplings with different fillings), pelmeni (meat dumplings), honey, chocolate, and tea and coffee.

== Export ==
During 2022, despite the full-scale war Ukraine exported 245,600 metric tons of organic products in the amount of US$219 million to 36 countries around the world, which is almost the same as in 2021 (261,000 metric tonnes, US$222 million). 95% of organic products from Ukraine were exported to European countries. Most products were exported by rail and road. Export volumes by vessels decreased, in particular, air transportation for export from Ukraine became impossible.

The largest importing countries of Ukrainian organic products in 2022 were the Netherlands, Germany, Austria, Switzerland, Poland, Lithuania, the United States, Italy, the United Kingdom, and the Czech Republic. Ukrainian organic producers also exported to some countries in Asia and North America.

The most exported organic products from Ukraine included corn, soybeans, and wheat. Other exports included sunflower oil, sunflower cake, sunflower seeds, frozen blueberries, barley, rapeseed, millet, and other products.

According to the European Commission's Report, in 2022, Ukraine ranked 3rd out of 125 countries by volume of organic products imported to the EU. Thus, in 2022, the EU imported 2.73 million tonnes of organic agri-food products, including 219 thousand tonnes (8%) from Ukraine, which is 85% of total Ukrainian organic export. Thus, Ukraine had leading positions among the exporting countries to the EU, having exported 93 thousand tonnes (77.1%) of cereals (excluding wheat and rice) and 20 thousand tonnes (22%) of organic oilseeds (excluding soybeans).

== Regulation ==
As of March 2024, organic production in Ukraine is regulated by the Law of Ukraine "On Basic Principles and Requirements for Organic Production, Circulation and Labelling of Organic Products", as well as relevant by-laws.

Regarding the history of development and implementation of organic legislation in Ukraine, initially, on 21 April 2011, the Verkhovna Rada of Ukraine adopted the Law "On Organic Production". The document defined the legal, economic, social and organisational framework for organic agriculture, requirements for growing, producing, processing, certification, labelling, transporting, storing and selling organic products and raw materials. But this law was not implemented.

In 2014, the Law "On the Production and Circulation of Organic Agricultural Products and Raw Materials" was adopted. This was the main legislative act in the field of organic market regulation until 2018.

Already on 10 July 2018, the Verkhovna Rada of Ukraine adopted the Law of Ukraine “On Basic Principles and Requirements for Organic Production, Circulation and Labelling of Organic Products” No. 2496, and on 2 August 2019 it was enacted.

In May 2023, the National Accreditation Agency of Ukraine issued the first accreditation certificate to Organic Standard LLC. In June 2023, the Ministry of Agrarian Policy included Organic Standard LLC in the State Register of Certification Bodies in the Field of Organic Production and Circulation of Organic Products, which allowed it to start certifying organic production and/or circulation of organic products in accordance with the requirements of Ukrainian legislation.

In August 2023, the Ministry of Agrarian Policy launched the Register of Operators that Produce Organic Products in Compliance with the Legislation in Organic Production, Circulation and Labelling of Organic Products.

== Labelling ==
State logo for organic products

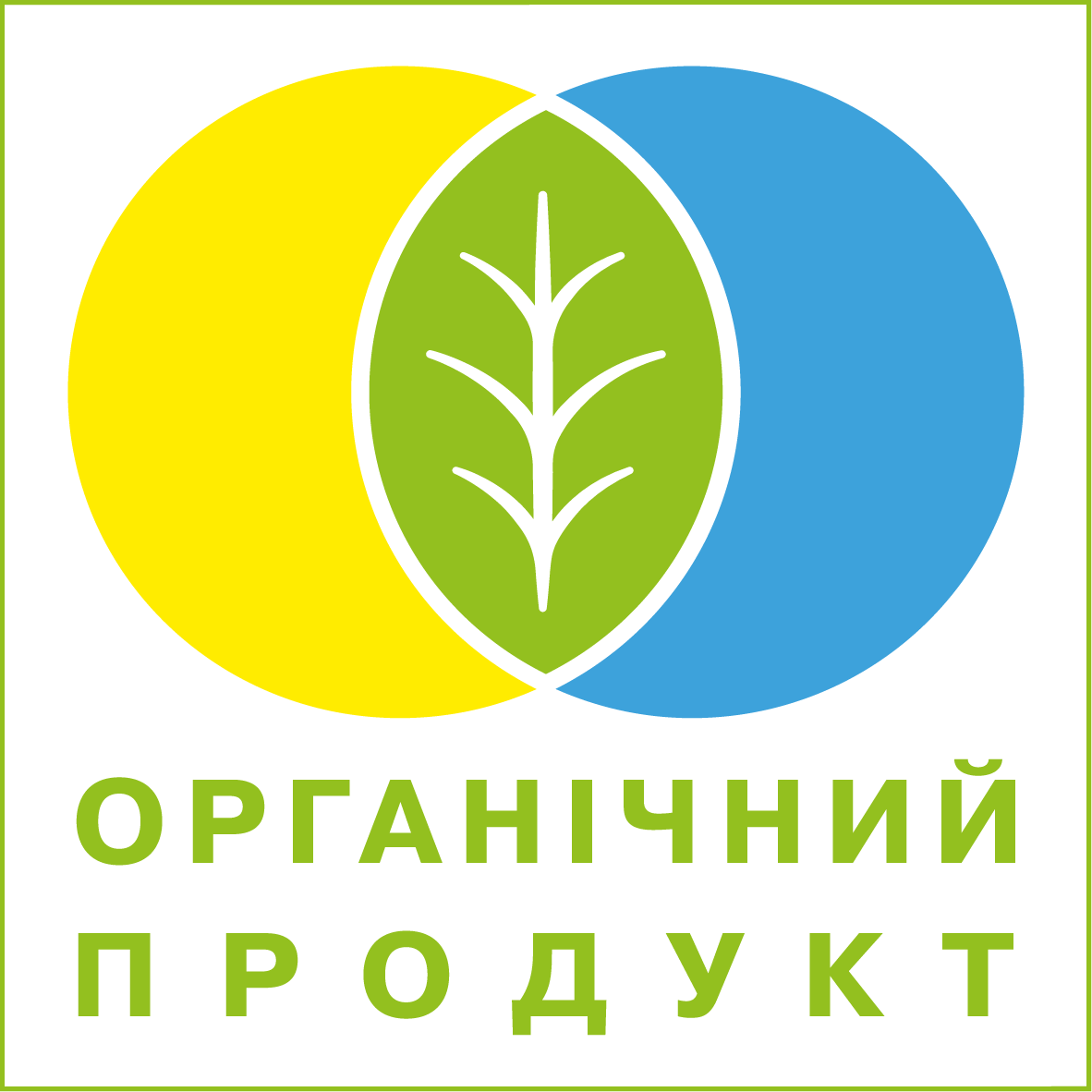

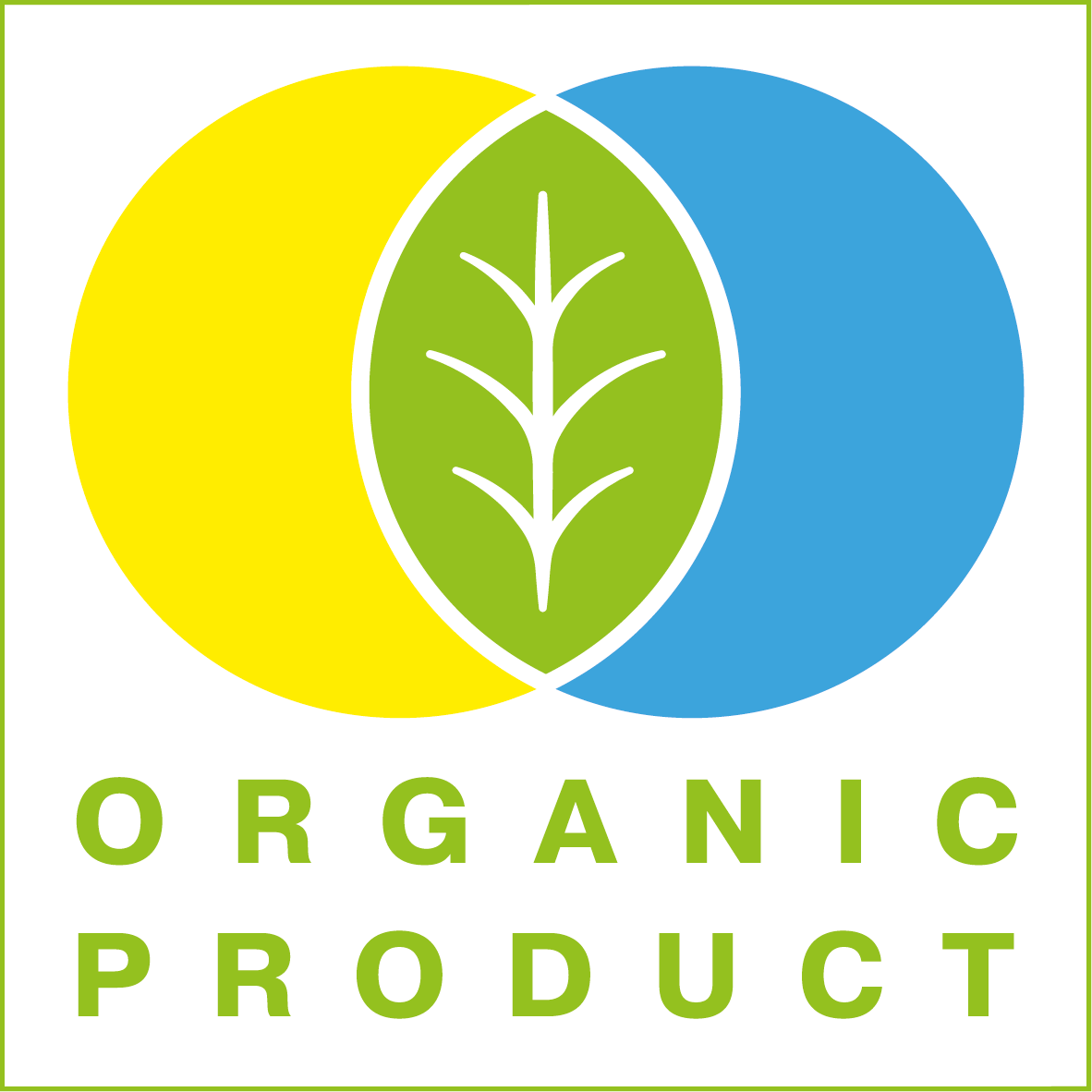

Labelling of products put into circulation and sold as organic products is carried out in accordance with the Law of Ukraine “On Basic Principles and Requirements for Organic Production, Circulation and Labelling of Organic Products”. A product may be labelled as an organic if it is produced following legal requirements in the field of organic production, circulation and labelling of organic products and contains at least 95% of organic ingredients of agricultural origin (by weight, excluding water and table salt) and no more than 5 per cent (by weight) of non-organic ingredients included in the List of substances (ingredients, components) authorised for use in organic production and permitted for use in food. Organic production of such a product shall be confirmed by a certificate.

Organic products put into circulation and sold shall be labelled with the state logo for organic products.

The state logo for organic products shall be placed exclusively on the products produced according to the Law of Ukraine “On Basic Principles and Requirements for Organic Production, Circulation and Labelling of Organic Products”, which is confirmed by a certificate that ensures that the production process and circulation of products comply with the legal requirements in the field of organic production, circulation and labelling of organic products.

The state logo is approved by Order No. 67 of the Ministry of Agrarian Policy from 22 February 2019, can be applied to any packaging, label (sticker), consumer packaging, back label, bottle collar, docket, cork, information sheet, documents, statement, and other packaging elements accompanying the organic products.

The state logo for organic products is registered as a trademark and belongs to the Ministry of Agrarian Policy and Food of Ukraine.

The requirements for the correct use of the state logo for organic products and their labelling are described on the website of the Ministry of Agrarian Policy and Food of Ukraine, as well as in the Guidelines for the use of the state logo for organic products.

In September 2023, during the conference “Organic Day in Ukraine” the first 50 Ukrainian organic producers who were certified according to the Ukrainian organic legislation in the field of organic production, circulation and labelling of organic products and can label their products with the state logo were awarded.

== Participation in BIOFACH ==
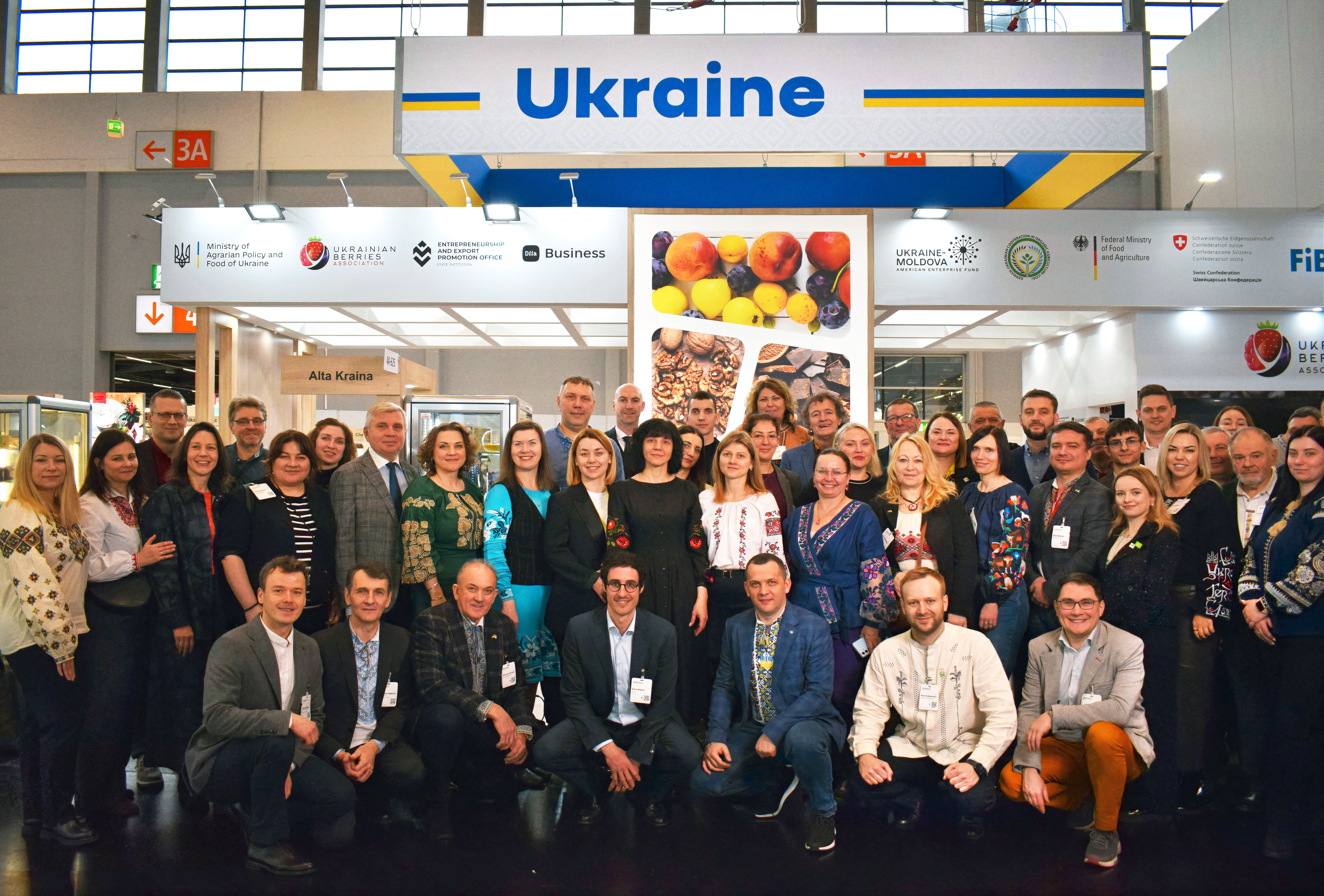
Policy delegation of Ukraine, organisers, partners and participants of the National Pavilion of Ukraine at BIOFACH 2025

Ukraine was represented at BioFach, the world's leading trade fair for organic food, for the first time in 2014. Since then, Ukraine has participated annually, including during the period of the full-scale invasion of Ukraine. As of 2025, Ukrainian companies have been represented at BIOFACH for 12 consecutive years.

In 2014, Ukraine participated for the first time with an organic National Pavilion at BIOFACH. The pavilion included nine Ukrainian companies and was organised within the framework of the Swiss-Ukrainian Organic Market Development Project, funded by the Swiss State Secretariat for Economic Affairs (SECO) and implemented by the Research Institute of Organic Agriculture (FiBL). The participation allowed Ukrainian representatives to interact with international buyers and industry representatives and supported further cooperation in the field of organic agriculture.

In 2015, Ukraine participated in the international organic trade fair BIOFACH with a National Pavilion for the second time, featuring again nine exhibiting companies presenting certified organic food: cereals, pulses, sunflower seeds, oil, berries, and other products and services. The pavilion was coordinated by a consortium of Ukrainian organic stakeholders with support from international partners.

In 2016, eleven companies showcased their products within the National Pavilion of Ukraine during BIOFACH 2016. The pavilion was coordinated by a consortium of Ukrainian organic stakeholders with support from national and international partners. According to the Organic Federation of Ukraine, approximately 400,000 hectares of agricultural land in Ukraine were certified organic at the time and cultivated by around 200 producers.

In 2017, seventeen Ukrainian companies participated in BIOFACH under the National Pavilion of Ukraine. The growth in exhibitor numbers corresponded with an increase in organically certified land and producers in Ukraine. The pavilion was supported by the Ministry of Agrarian Policy and Food of Ukraine and the Ministry of Foreign Affairs of Ukraine, alongside international partners.

In 2018, Ukraine marked its fifth consecutive year of participation at BIOFACH with the National Pavilion of Ukraine representing twenty companies, including producers of cereals, oilseeds, berries, tea, tomato products, and a certification body. The exhibition area of the Ukrainian pavilion increased compared to previous years. The pavilion received support from Ukrainian authorities as well as international partners, including Swiss, German, and multilateral organisations.

Twenty-five Ukrainian exporters participated in BIOFACH 2019. The National Pavilion of Ukraine covered 130 m^{2} focused on higher value-added products, including oils, teas, honey, tomato paste, dairy products, juices, and fruit pastes. The Ukrainian policy delegation, led by Deputy Minister Olga Trofimtseva, attended the event to engage in international dialogue and meetings with policymakers and stakeholders in the organic sector.

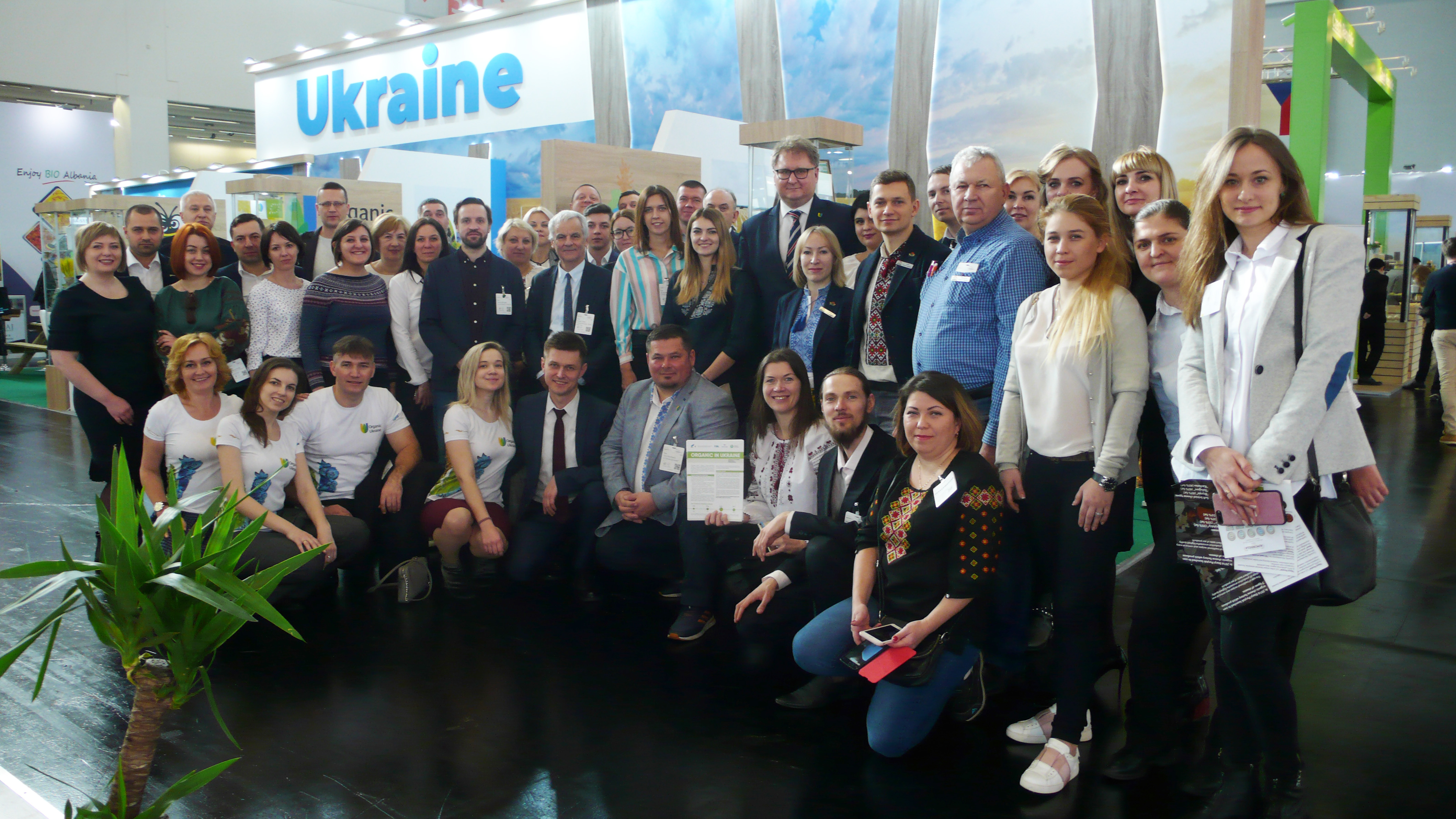
Policy delegation of Ukraine, organisers, partners and participants of the National Pavilion of Ukraine at BIOFACH 2020

A total of 37 Ukrainian companies were represented at BIOFACH 2020 through two collective stands and individual exhibition stands. Compared to earlier years, the range of products presented by Ukrainian exhibitors expanded. While the first National Pavilion of Ukraine primarily featured raw organic products, by 2020, a broader selection of higher value-added organic products was displayed. Seventeen Ukrainian companies, including producers, processors, and traders, participated in the National Pavilion under the name Organic Ukraine Business Hub.

BIOFACH 2021 was held online as BIOFACH eSpecial due to COVID-19 restrictions. Thirty-four Ukrainian exporters participated in the trade fair, with 22 companies presenting over 200 organic products within the National Pavilion of Ukraine, Organic Ukraine Business Hub. The pavilion was organised by a non-governmental organisation active in the Ukrainian organic sector, with support from American and Swiss international technical assistance programmes.

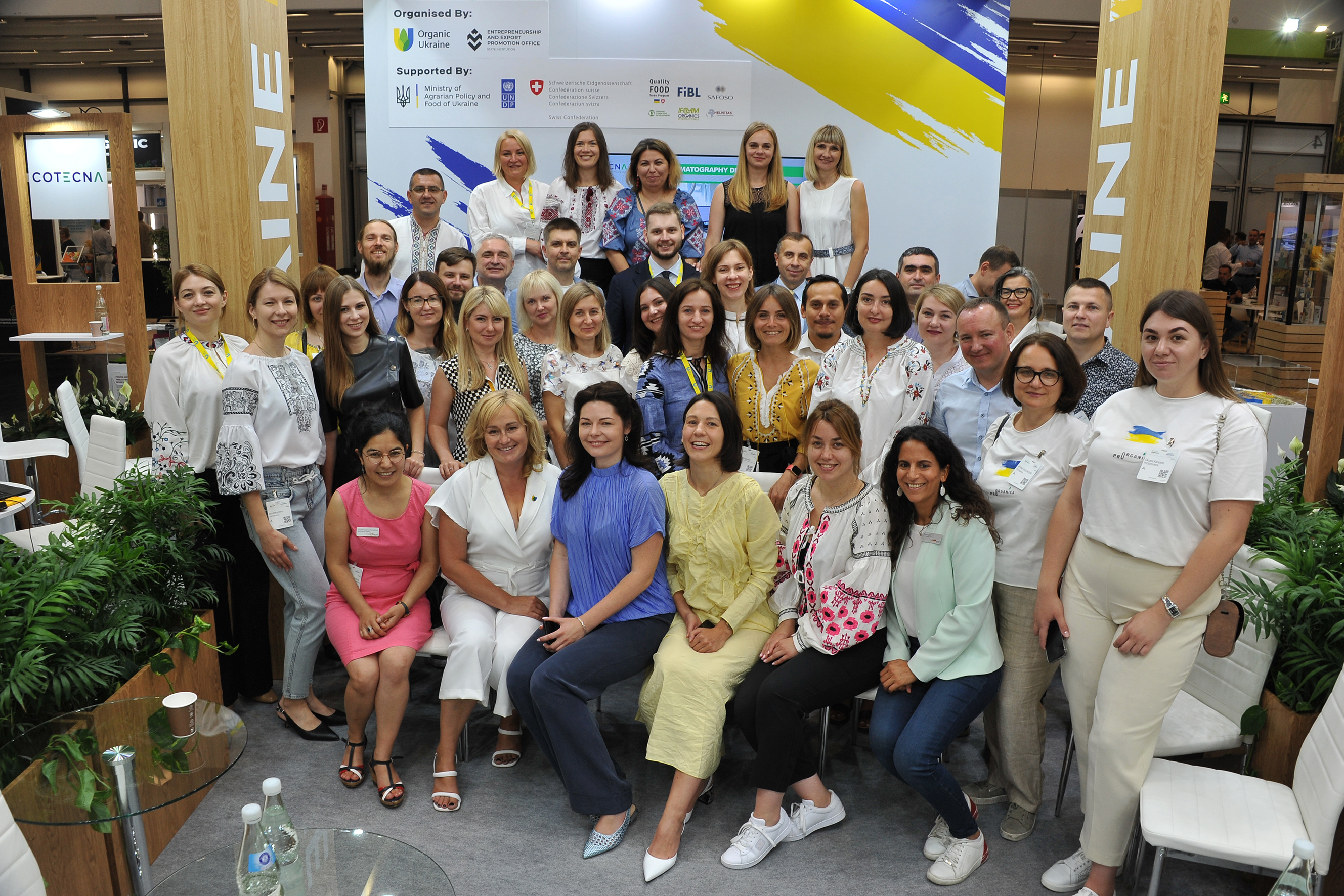
Organisers, partners and participants of the National Pavilion of Ukraine at BIOFACH 2022

The 33rd BIOFACH took place from 26 to 29 July 2022. Thirty-two Ukrainian companies participated, including 21 within the National Pavilion of Ukraine. Ukrainian representatives participated in congress sessions on the impact of war on agriculture and the development of organic farming in Eastern Europe. BIOFACH 2022 focused on Ukraine due to the Russian invasion on 24 February 2022. The organisation of the pavilion was supported by government bodies as well as international partners.

Twenty-three Ukrainian companies participated in BIOFACH 2023, showcasing grain crops, nuts, berries, fruit juices, sunflower oil, fruit rolls, baby food, snacks, breakfast cereals, and bio-based products. In 2022, Ukraine exported 225,814 tonnes of organic products to the European Union and Switzerland, representing a 13% increase compared with 2021, despite the ongoing full-scale war. The documentary “Ukraine – One year after the war – Innovation power of organic farms” was presented within the pavilion.

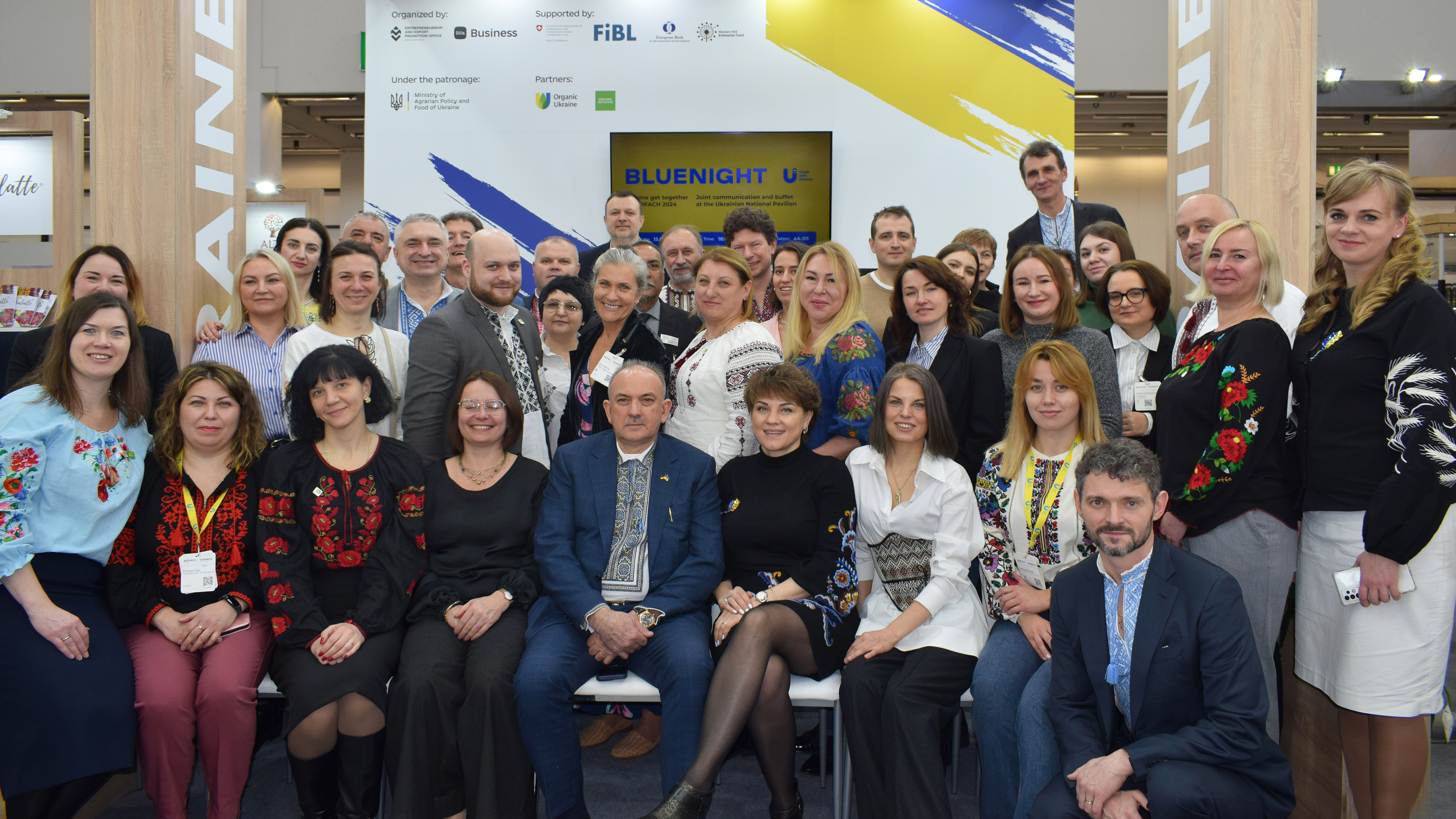
Organisers, partners and participants of the National Pavilion of Ukraine at BIOFACH 2024

In 2024, Ukraine was represented by two National Pavilions, one collective stand, and three individual stands, totalling 38 companies. For the first time, the state organic product logo was presented on products at the pavilion. Despite the ongoing war and logistical disruptions, Ukraine remained the third-largest supplier of organic products to the European Union, according to the Ministry of Agrarian Policy and Food of Ukraine. The BIOFACH Congress included a session on women in Ukraine's organic sector during wartime.

In 2025, Ukraine was represented through the National Pavilion and additional stands. Thirty-two Ukrainian exporters presented berries, fruits, dairy, nuts, honey, chocolate, grains, juices, baby food, snacks, oils, and other organic products. In addition, a conference titled "Ukraine’s Organic Sector in the EU Integration Process – Challenges, Opportunities, and Post-War Resilience" held as part of the BIOFACH 2025 congress, brought together representatives of the trade sector and public authorities from Ukraine and the European Union to discuss the current situation in Ukraine and related trade and regulatory frameworks.

=== Summary of participation by year ===
Year	No. of companies	Key Feature
2014	9	First National Pavilion of Ukraine.
2015	9	Second participation with the National Pavilion of Ukraine presenting core Ukrainian organic product categories and services.
2016	11	Expanded organic product range, including dairy and processed goods.
2017	17	Growth of organic participants correspond with the increase in organically certified land and producers in Ukraine.
2018	20	Fifth anniversary; growth of National Pavilion of Ukraine area over the years.
2019	25	Stronger focus on higher value-added organic products. Participation of the Ukrainian policy delegation.
2020	37	Participation through two collective stands and individual exhibition stands
2021	34	Digital participation at BIOFACH eSpecial. Over 200 Ukrainian organic products were presented.
2022	32	Return to an in-person event; thematic focus on the impact of the war in Ukraine on the organic sector.
2023	23	Short film “Ukraine – One year after the war – Innovation power of organic farms” showcasing organic operators’ of Ukraine work in 2022.
2024	38	Organic sector of Ukraine are represented by two National Pavilions, a collective stand, and three companies exhibiting their products independently. Introduction of the Ukrainian state logo for organic products and the goods labelled with it.
2025	32	Focus on EU integration and the resilience of the Ukrainian organic sector during three challenging years of war.

== Stakeholders ==
- Organic Initiative is a public association that brings together organic stakeholders which aims to promote organic value added trade on the domestic and international markets and contribute to overall organic sector development in Ukraine.
- Organic Ukraine is a union of producers of certified organic products, established to form and develop the Ukrainian and the global organic markets, and to protect the interests of Ukrainian certified producers both in Ukraine and abroad.
- Organic Federation of Ukraine is an organisation that aims to comprehensively promote the values and worldview inherent in the supporters of the global organic movement, improving the efficiency of agricultural production with the simultaneous development of the modern world and domestic technologies safe for nature and people, and promote the organic movement in Ukraine.
- Information Centre “Green Dossier” is an international charitable organisation that promotes the principles of sustainable development and their integration into national policies and government programs by disseminating objective environmental and social information to mass media, local communities, government and business, involving them in practical action.
- Organic Standard is the first and only Ukrainian certification body that inspects and certifies organic production. The company provides services to more than 600 operators, which is more than 75% of all organic operators in Ukraine.
- Ecoterra is a Lviv-based NGO that aims to engage the general public in the problem of pesticide use both on farms and large households and on small plots of individual citizens.
- Ukrainian Berries Association is a business association that unites all professional players of fruit and berry market. The members of the association are exclusively legal entities which are specialized in the growing and processing berries and stone fruits, supplying planting material, plant protection products, material and technical resources etc. to cooperatives, public organizations, educational institutions and other representatives of the sector.
- OrganicInfo.ua is a specialised information portal for the promotion of organic production, organic food, and sustainable lifestyles. The portal contains all the information about the organic market of Ukraine: legislative framework, history of the organic movement in Ukraine and the world, practical information for organic operators, useful information for consumers, results of organic market research, news, and announcements of organic events. The information is available in Ukrainian and English.
- Organic Knowledge Platform is a web portal that brings together all the scientific, informational, and practical materials available in Ukraine about the organic sector and makes them accessible to a wide range of scientists, teachers, students, practitioners and members of the organic movement. All materials published on the platform are evaluated by independent industry experts for their relevance and quality.

=== Public authorities and government agencies ===
- The Ministry of Agrarian Policy and Food of Ukraine is the central executive body that develops the regulatory framework for the organic sector in Ukraine, maintains the state registers of certification bodies, operators and organic seeds and planting material, and provides training and professional development for organic inspectors.
- The State Service of Ukraine on Food Safety and Consumer Protection is the central executive body authorised to conduct state supervision (control) in the field of organic production, circulation and labelling of organic products in accordance with the organic legislation of Ukraine. This includes state supervision (control) over compliance with the legislation in the field of organic production, circulation and labelling of organic products: inspection of certification bodies; random inspection of operators; monitoring of organic products on the market to prevent the entry of non-organic products labelled as organic.
- The State Institution “Entrepreneurship and Export Promotion Office” (EEPO), which aims to promote the development and support of small and medium-sized enterprises, support and promote the export of goods, works and services of Ukrainian producers in accordance with the program documents of the Cabinet of Ministers of Ukraine and other state planning documents, started supporting the organic export market of Ukraine in 2019. EEPO contributes to the development of the Ukrainian organic exporters’ potential, promotion of the organic sector and formation of a positive image of Ukraine as a reliable supplier of organic products abroad. EEPO actively supports and organises various events for organic exporters, including national pavilions at key international trade fairs, such as BIOFACH (Nuremberg, Germany), Anuga (Cologne, Germany), SIAL (Paris, France), and Middle East Organic & Natural Products Expo (Dubai, UAE). EEPO also created the Catalogue of Ukrainian Exporters of Organic Products in partnership with Organic Standard certification body.

Under the patronage and with the participation of the Ministry of Agrarian Policy, in cooperation with the organic sector stakeholders and with the support of international development partners, various activities take place for the development of the organic market in Ukraine.

== Technical assistance projects and programmes ==
- The Swiss-Ukrainian program “Higher Value Added Trade from the Organic and Dairy Sector in Ukraine” (QFTP), financed by Switzerland and implemented by the Research Institute of Organic Agriculture (FiBL, Switzerland) in partnership with SAFOSO AG (Switzerland).
- The Swiss-Ukrainian program "Organic Trade for Development in Eastern Europe" (OT4D), financed by Switzerland through Swiss State Secretariat for Economic Affairs (SECO) and implemented by IFOAM - Organics International in partnership HELVETAS Swiss Intercooperation and the Research Institute of Organic Agriculture (FiBL, Switzerland).
- Project "German-Ukrainian Cooperation in Organic Agriculture (COA).

The project/program representatives provide their expertise during development of the organic legislative framework and implementation of the legislation in the field of organic production, circulation and labelling of organic products, and support various activities related to organic production.

In 2024, Ukraine was successfully represented at the world's largest international trade fair of organic products BIOFACH, held in Nuremberg, Germany. The feedback from exhibitors and partners on the work of the National Pavilion of Ukraine at BIOFACH 2024, which was organised by the State Institution “Entrepreneurship and Export Promotion Office” (EEPO, Ukraine), the national project Diia.Business, under the patronage of the Ministry of Agrarian Policy and Food of Ukraine, in partnership with Organic Ukraine NGO and Organic Initiative Public Association, with the support of Switzerland within the framework of the Swiss-Ukrainian Program “Higher Value Added Trade from the Organic and Dairy Sector in Ukraine” (QFTP) implemented by the Research Institute of Organic Agriculture (FiBL, Switzerland) in partnership with SAFOSO AG (Switzerland); EBRD, funded by Switzerland through the EBRD's Small Business Impact Fund; and Western NIS Enterprise Fund was recorded in a video.

In order to promote organic production in Ukraine among potential Ukrainian producers and foreign investors, a video about organic production “Organic in Ukraine” was created in cooperation with the Swiss-Ukrainian project "Organic Market Development in Ukraine".

Also, at the request of the project “German-Ukrainian Cooperation in Organic Agriculture”, the video production company Svoie Kino created a film about the organic sector of Ukraine during the war "Ukrainian Organic Movement: Achievements, War, Prospects".

== See also ==
- Organic food
- Organic farming
- Organic certification
- Sheep farming in Ukraine
