= Pavlo Kukhta =

Ukrainian economist and politician

- Павло Кухта
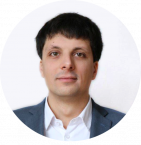

Acting Minister of Economic Development, Trade and Agriculture
- In office 4 March 2020 – 17 March 2020
- President: Volodymyr Zelenskyy
- Prime Minister: Denys Shmyhal
- Preceded by: Tymofiy Mylovanov
- Succeeded by: Ihor Petrashko

Personal details
- Born: 3 December 1985 (age 40) Kyiv, Ukrainian SSR, Soviet Union (now Ukraine)
- Party: Voice
- Spouse: Iuliia Mendel
- Education: Igor Sikorsky Kyiv Polytechnic Institute; Aspen Institute
- Occupation: Economist politician

Pavlo Andriiovych Kukhta (Ukrainian: Павло Андрійович Кухта; born 3 December 1985) is a Ukrainian economist and politician. On 4 March 2020, he was appointed as the Acting Minister of Economic Development, Trade and Agriculture.

== Early life ==
Kukhta was born on 3 December 1985 in Kyiv, which was then part of the Ukrainian SSR in the Soviet Union. In 2006, he graduated in computer science from Kyiv Polytechnic Institute, then in systems analysis. In 2018, he studied at the Kyiv campus of the Aspen Institute.

== Career ==
Kukhta is an economist at the Center for Economic Solutions. He cooperated with the Reanimation Package of Reforms as an expert, and was Deputy Head of the Strategic Group of Advisers on Reform Support.

From 2015 to 2019, he worked as an adviser to the Minister of Finance. From 2016 to 2019, he was an adviser to the Prime Minister of Ukraine. In addition, on a voluntary basis, he was an assistant to the deputies Yaroslav Markevich and Ihor Lutsenko during the 8th convocation of the Verkhovna Rada.

In the July 2019 Ukrainian parliamentary election Kukhta failed as a candidate of Voice to get elected to parliament. His 25th place on the national election list was 8 places behind the elected members of the party.

== Military service ==
From September 2019 to April 2020, Kukhta served as First Deputy Minister of Economic Development, Trade and Agriculture.

On March 26, 2022, Pavlo Kukhta went to the front line of the Russian invasion of Ukraine., On about April 20, 2022, he resigned from the Ukrainian Army.

== Personal life ==
He is fluent in Ukrainian, Russian, and English. On 4 June 2022 he married Iuliia Mendel, the former press secretary of President of Ukraine Volodymyr Zelenskyy.

== See also ==
- Shmyhal Government
