= Tymofiy Mylovanov =

Ukrainian economist (born 1975)

Tymofiy Serhiyovych Mylovanov
- Тимофій Милованов
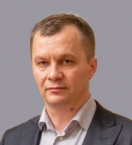
- President and member of the KSE International Academic Board

Minister of Economic Development, Trade and Agriculture of Ukraine
- In office 29 August 2019 – 4 March 2020
- President: Volodymyr Zelenskyy
- Prime Minister: Ihor Petrashko
- Preceded by: Stepan Kubiv (economy and trade); Olha Trofimtseva (agriculture)

Member of the Council of the National Bank of Ukraine
- In office 7 July 2016 – 3 September 2019
- President: Petro Poroshenko; Volodymyr Zelenskyy
- Prime Minister: Oleksiy Honcharuk
- Succeeded by: Vitaliy Shapran

Personal details
- Born: 18 March 1975 (age 51) Kyiv, Ukrainian SSR, Soviet Union
- Citizenship: Ukraine
- Party: Independent
- Education: Kyiv School of Economics; National University of Kyiv-Mohyla Academy; Kyiv Polytechnic Institute
- Occupation: Economist

Tymofiy Mylovanov (Ukrainian: Тимофій Сергійович Милованов; born 18 March 1975, Kyiv, Ukrainian SSR, Soviet Union) is the President of the Kyiv School of Economics (since 2020). He served as Minister of Economic Development, Trade and Agriculture of Ukraine in from 2019 to 2020 and is a visiting assosiate professor of economics at the University of Pittsburgh.

== Biography ==
=== Education ===
Mylovanov was born and raised in Kyiv. He graduated from Kyiv Physics and Mathematics School No. 145. In 1997, he earned a degree in management from the Igor Sikorsky Kyiv Polytechnic Institute.

In 1999 he completed a master's programme in economics through the EERC at the National University of Kyiv-Mohyla Academy, the predecessor of the Kyiv School of Economics. He went on to earn an M.S. in economics from the University of Wisconsin–Madison in 2001 and a Ph.D. in the same field in 2004.

=== Academic career ===
From 2004 to 2008, Mylovanov did postdoctoral research and worked as a junior professor at theUniversity of Bonn. He afterwards joined Pennsylvania State University, where he served as an assistant peofessor from 2008 to 2011. Between 2010 and 2013, he also lectured at University of Pennsylvania.

In 2013, Mylovanov joined the University of Pittsburgh as an assistant professor. He was promoted to associate professor with tenure in 2015. As of 2026, he holds a visiting associate professor position at the university.

His research focuses on game theory, contract theory and institutional design. His work has been published in academic journals including ''Review of Economic Studies'', ''American Economic Review'', ''Econometrica'' and ''Journal of Economic Theory''.

Among his publications are “Mechanism Design by an Informed Principal: Private Values with Transferable Utility”, co-authored with Thomas Tröger and published in ''Review of Economic Studies'' in 2014; “Optimal Allocation with Ex Post Verification and Limited Penalties”, co-authored with Andriy Zapechelnyuk and published in ''American Economic Review'' in September 2017; and “Persuasion of a Privately Informed Receiver”, co-authored with Anton Kolotilin, Andriy Zapechelnyuk and Ming Li and published in ''Econometrica'' in November 2017.

In 2014, he co-founded the analytical platform Vox Ukraine and became its editor.

Since 2015, he has served as a deputy editor of the academic journal ''Review of Economic Design''.

=== Kyiv School of Economics ===
On 1 March 2016, the Board of Directors of the Kyiv School of Economics elected Mylovanov as the school's interim president, but, when Mylovanov joined the council of the National Bank of Ukraine, he stepped down from the position. Later that year he was named honorary president of KSE.

After serving as a government minister, Mylovanov returned to the Kyiv School of Economics as its president. The KSE Board of Directors approved his return, and he has held the position since 6 April 2020.

When Russia started its full-scale invasion of Ukraine in February 2022, Mylovanov initiated a fundraising campaign through KSE. On 24 February, during evacuation, he contacted the school's major donors to ask for emergency funding. Two days later, the KSE team launched a campaign that raised about $15 million for humanitarian aid in Ukraine during the first month of the invasion. According to Mylovanov, donors contributed approximately $150 million to the KSE Foundation between 2022 and April 2025.

According to ''Ukrainska Pravda'', KSE grew considerably during the five years following Mylovanov's return from government, and the student numbers increased ninefold during the full-scale war. Mylovanov said that the school had 30 students when he joined it in 2016.

=== Government service ===
On 7 July 2016, Mylovanov was appointed to the Council of the National Bank of Ukraine. He has became deputy chair in October 2016. The Verkhovna Rada dismissed him from the Council on 3 September 2019.

On 29 August 2019, he became Minister of Economic Development, Trade and Agriculture of Ukraine. He held the post until 4 March 2020. On 24 December 2019, he was also appointed to the National Investment Council.

On 22 November 2020, he was appointed an non-staff adviser to Andriy Yermak, head of the Office of the President of Ukraine.

On 14 April 2021, the Cabinet of Ministers of Ukraine appointed him acting director general of the state-owned National Investment Fund of Ukraine.

On 21 May 2021, Mylovanov was appointed to the Supervisory Board of the state concern Ukroboronprom with his consent, under Presidential Decree No. 209/2021. On 1 June, the board unanimously elected him as its chair. On 29 December 2023, the Cabinet of Ministers approved a new composition of the board, which included Mylovanov.

In August 2023, Mylovanov joined the Advisory Council on Economic Policy, an international group of economists established by the government to develop recommendations for Ukraine's recovery. Other members have included Roger Myerson and Kenneth Rogoff.

Mylovanov was a member of the Supervisory Board of Energoatom. On 11 November 2025, after the National Anti-Corruption Bureau of Ukraine made public its Operation Midas investigation, Mylovanov announced his resignation from the board, saying that the company was not responding adequately to corruption challenges.

On 13 November 2025, he announced that he was leaving the Ukroboronprom Supervisory Board after the KSE Board of Directors strongly advised him to resign from all supervisory board positions at state-owned companies.

== Awards and recognition ==
- 2014 and 2015 – ranked second and eighth, respectively, in Forbes Ukraine's “Top Economic Thinkers” list of Ukraine's leading economists.
- June 2021 – included in NV's “Top 100 Most Influential People in Ukraine in 2021” list, ranked 52nd.
- May 2025 – included in NV's “People of NV” list of 100 Ukrainians whom the publication considered to be moving the country forward.
- 2025 – elected by members of the European Economic Association (EEA) to its council for the 2025–2029 term.
- 8 October 2025 – elected a Fellow of the Econometric Society, one of 25 people elected as Fellows in 2025.
- 17 April 2026 – won the “Academia and Scientific Innovation” category at the EY Entrepreneur of the Year 2026 competition in Ukraine.

== Selected publications ==
- Mylovanov, Timofiy; Tröger, Thomas (2014). "Mechanism Design by an Informed Principal: Private Values with Transferable Utility". Review of Economic Studies. 81 (4): 1668–1707. doi:10.1093/restud/rdu019.
- Mylovanov, Timofiy; Zapechelnyuk, Andriy (2017). "Optimal Allocation with Ex Post Verification and Limited Penalties". American Economic Review. 107 (9): 2666–2694. doi:10.1257/aer.20140494.
- Kolotilin, Anton; Mylovanov, Timofiy; Zapechelnyuk, Andriy; Li, Ming (2017). "Persuasion of a Privately Informed Receiver". Econometrica. 85 (6): 1949–1964. doi:10.3982/ECTA13251.
- Kolotilin, Anton; Mylovanov, Timofiy; Zapechelnyuk, Andriy (2022). "Censorship as Optimal Persuasion". Theoretical Economics. 17 (2): 561–585. doi:10.3982/TE4071.
- Mylovanov, Tymofiy; Zapechelnyuk, Andy (2022). "A Model of Debates: Moderation vs Free Speech" (PDF) (Working paper).
- Mylovanov, Tymofiy; Roland, Gérard (2022). "Ukraine's Post-War Reconstruction and Governance Reforms". In Gorodnichenko, Yuriy; Sologoub, Ilona; Weder di Mauro, Beatrice (eds.). Rebuilding Ukraine: Principles and Policies (PDF). London: CEPR Press. pp. 39–71. ISBN 978-1-912179-67-1.
- Nell, Jacob; Bilan, Olena; Becker, Torbjörn; Gorodnichenko, Yuriy; Mylovanov, Tymofiy; Shapoval, Nataliia (2022). Financing Ukraine's Victory (PDF) (Report). CEPR Policy Insight. Centre for Economic Policy Research.
- Sonnenfeld, Jeffrey A.; Mylovanov, Tymofiy; Shapoval, Nataliia; Tian, Steven; Onoprienko, Andrii; Hirsty, Georgia; Wyrebkowski, Michal (2023). "The Russian Business Retreat – How the Ratings Measured Up One Year Later". SSRN 4343547.
- Mylovanov, Tymofiy; Zapechelnyuk, Andy (2023). "Constructive vs Toxic Argumentation in Debates". SSRN 4368306.
- Weder di Mauro, Beatrice; Rogoff, Kenneth; Sologoub, Ilona; Mylovanov, Tymofiy; Obstfeld, Maurice; Johnson, Simon; Guriev, Sergei; Gorodnichenko, Yuriy; Eichengreen, Barry (2023). Post-War Macroeconomic Framework for Ukraine (Report). London: CEPR Press. ISBN 978-1-912179-63-3.
- Mylovanov, Tymofiy; Shapoval, Nataliia; Onopriienko, Andrii; Hrybanovskyi, Oleksii (2023). "How to Identify Foreign Business in Russia and What Are the Key Issues of Creating and Keeping a Full List of the Largest Foreign Companies in Russia". SSRN 4407284.
- Gorodnichenko, Yuriy; Mylovanov, Tymofiy (2023). "Resisting the Russian Culture of Corruption in Ukraine: The Fight for the Rule of Law and Empathy". The Berkeley Blog – via Policy Commons.

== See also ==
- Honcharuk Government

Political offices
Preceded by Stepan Kubiv	Minister of Economic Development and Trade; 2019–2020	Succeeded by Ihor Petrashko
