= Oleksandr Shlapak =

Ukrainian politician (born 1960)

- Олександр Шлапак
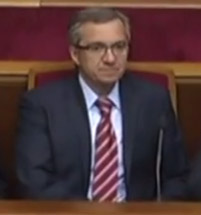
- Shlapak in 2014

14th Minister of Finance of Ukraine
- In office 27 February 2014 – 2 December 2014
- Prime Minister: Arseniy Yatsenyuk
- Preceded by: Yuriy Kolobov
- Succeeded by: Natalie Jaresko

12th Minister of Economy of Ukraine
- In office 10 July 2001 – 30 November 2002
- Prime Minister: Anatoliy Kinakh
- Preceded by: Vasyl Rohovyi
- Succeeded by: Valeriy Khoroshkovskyi

Personal details
- Born: 1 January 1960 (age 66) Irkutsk, Russia SFSR
- Party: unaffiliated
- Education: Lviv Polytechnic Institute

Oleksandr Vіtaliyovych Shlapak (Ukrainian: Олександр Віталійович Шлапак; born 1 January 1960) is a Ukrainian politician, bureaucrat, and former Minister of Finance of Ukraine.

== Biography ==
He was born to Vitaliy Fedorovich (1935–1995) and Katerina Grigorіvna (born 1935), now retired in Irkutsk. After completing higher education, he enrolled 1977 in engineering at the Lviv Polytechnic Institute and graduated as system engineer in 1982 with a degree in "automatic control systems". From 1982–1984 he worked as a software engineer at Lviv Polytechnic Institute. In 2009, he graduated from Ukrainian State University of Finance and International Trade with a master's degree in "International Economics" and a Candidate of Sciences degree in economic sciences.

From 1984 to 1990 he was secretary of the Komsomol Committee of Lviv Polytechnic Institute, head of the department of the Lviv regional committee of Komsomol organization LKSMU, and head of the central committee of the students and youth LKSMU. From 1990–1993 he was chairman of the regional council of the Democratic Youth Union of Lviv.

In 1993–1998 he worked for PrivatBank as director of the Lviv branch, then a "director of Western management" and finally deputy chairman of the Board. From 1998–2000 he was head economic adviser to the Vice Prime Minister of Ukraine. From February 2000 to July 2001 he was Deputy Minister and for 50 days from 10 July until 30 August 2001 Minister of Economy of Ukraine. In addition he became Minister of Economy and European Integration of Ukraine at that time until 30 November 2002, Member of the National Security and Defense Council of Ukraine until December 2002).

By January 2003 he became Deputy Chairman of the National Bank, before becoming Chairman of the State Treasury of Ukraine on 12 October 2005. He was there less than a year until 10 August 2006. In November 2006 he became head of service of socio-economic development in the Presidential Secretariat of Ukraine for 4 months, until March 2007. The following 3 years he was First Deputy Head of the Presidential Secretariat of Ukraine, Vice President in the Cabinet of Ministers of Ukraine until February 2010. In 2010 he accepted a position in the private sector as Vice President of "IMG International Holding Company" before returning to politics in the First Yatsenyuk Government as Minister of Finance of Ukraine on 27 February 2014. On 2 December 2014 Natalie Jaresko succeeded Shlapak as Minister of Finance.

Shlapak was Chairman of PrivatBank from 18 December 2016 until 21 July 2017.

== Voluntary activities ==
Since 2005 he has headed the NGO "Association "Ukraine – Vietnam". He continues to hold positions as Co-president of Polish-Ukrainian Chamber of Commerce and as Vice President of the Association of taxpayers.

== Awards ==
- Order of Prince Yaroslav the Wise V degree (1 January 2010) — for outstanding contribution to nation building and socio-economic development of the Ukrainian state
- Order of Merit III degree (19 March 2004) — for significant personal contributions to the state of monetary policy, the development of banking and professionalism
- Honored Economist of Ukraine (7 February 2008) — for his significant personal contribution to the integration of Ukraine into the World Trade Organization
- the State prize — Friendship Order of the Socialist Republic of Vietnam in 2011.

== Private life ==
He is married to Oksana Markovna (born 1960) and has 2 daughters, named Galina (born 1980) and Katerina (born 1983).
