= R. K. Cho Economics Prize =

South Korean economics award

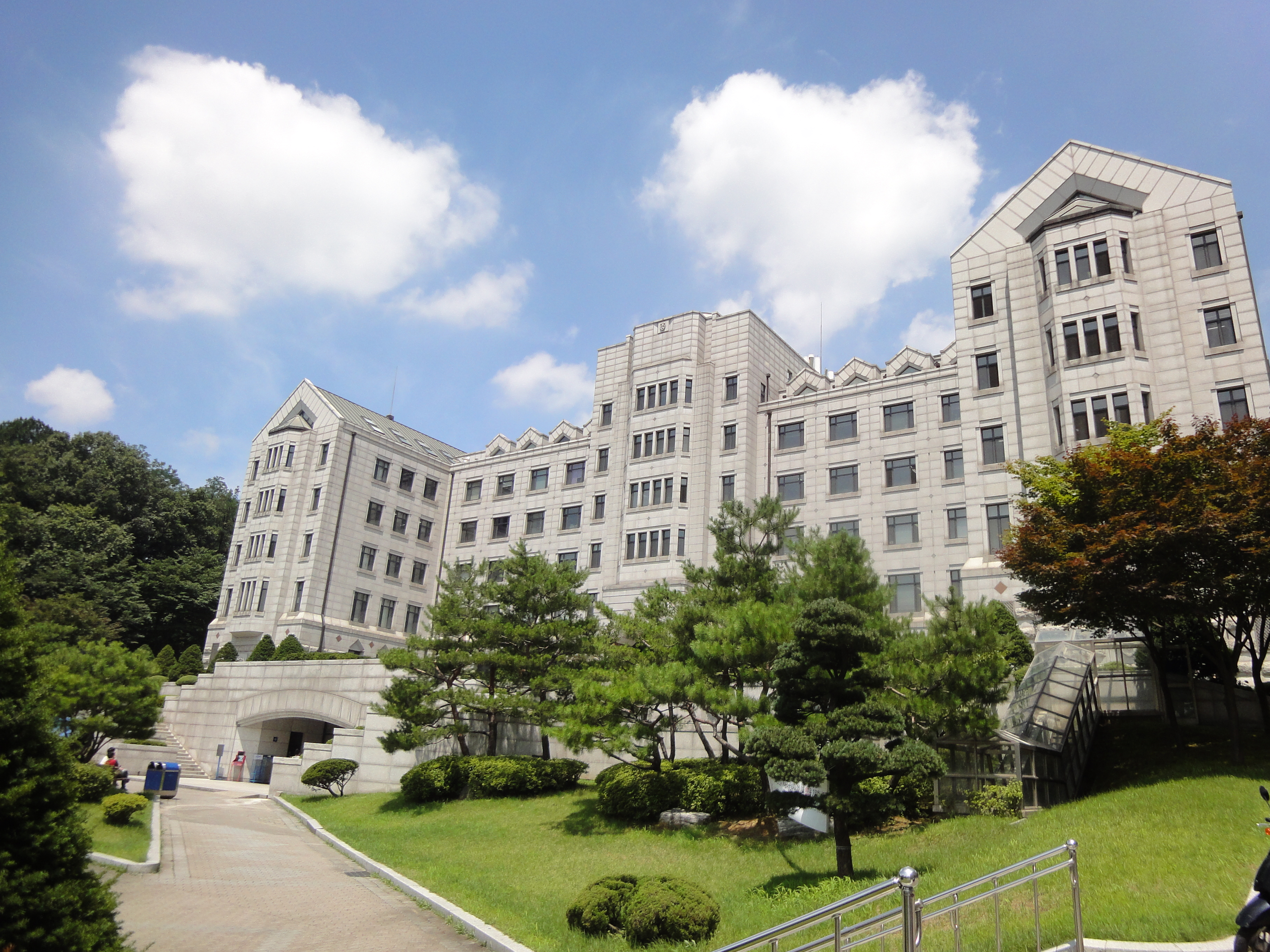
- Daewoo Hall, where the award ceremony is held

Korean name
- Hangul: 조락교경제학상
- Hanja: 趙樂敎經濟學賞
- RR: Jo Rakgyo gyeongjehaksang
- MR: Cho Rakkyo kyŏngjehaksang

The R. K. Cho Economics Prize is awarded by Yonsei University in Seoul, South Korea to academics in the field of economics who have contributed to the development of scholarship and education. As of 2018, the prize includes a plaque, a medal, and a monetary award of ₩100 million.

== History ==
The prize was established in 2007 with an endowment from R. K. Cho, the president of Samryoong Co. (KRX: 014970) and an alumnus of Yonsei University's economics department. Cho was motivated to create the award after seeing the results of his prior humanities-focused donations to Yonsei University, and hoped the prize could help to connect students of his alma mater and famous South Korean economists overseas. Originally awarded only to South Korean citizens, in 2015 the prize was opened to foreign scholars as well. Due to the COVID-19 pandemic, no recipient was selected in 2021, and the award ceremony for the twelfth recipient (Valerie Ramey in 2020) was delayed until September 2022 when it could be held jointly with the ceremony for the thirteenth recipient (Yuriy Gorodnichenko).

R. K. Cho died in January 2024.

== Recipients ==
1. 2008: Yeon-Koo Che of Columbia University
2. 2009: Hyun-Song Shin of Princeton University for work in financial crises and financial stability
3. 2010: Joon Y. Park of Indiana University
4. 2011: Jinyong Hahn of the University of California, Los Angeles
5. 2012: In-koo Cho of the University of Illinois
6. 2013: Chang Yongsung of Yonsei University
7. 2014: Choi Jae-pil of Yonsei University
8. 2015: Richard Rogerson of Princeton University
9. 2016: Quang Vuong of New York University, for work in econometrics
10. 2017: Michihiro Kandori of the University of Tokyo, for "contributions to the theory of social norms, convention, and cooperation"
11. 2018: Hyungsik Roger Moon of the University of Southern California, for theoretical works on panel data
12. 2020: Valerie Ramey of the University of California, San Diego, for work on the macroneconomic effects of fiscal expenditure
13. 2022: Yuriy Gorodnichenko of the University of California, Berkeley, for work on inflation expectation surveys
14. 2023: John A. List of the University of Chicago, for work on field experiments
15. 2024: Susan C. Athey of Stanford University
16. 2025: Atif Mian of Princeton University

== See also ==
- List of economics awards
