= Oleksandr Kravchenko =

Ukrainian politician (born 1983)

- Олександр Кравченко
- Kravchenko in 2026

Minister of Economy and Environment
- Incumbent
- Assumed office 16 July 2026
- President: Volodymyr Zelenskyy
- Prime Minister: Serhii Koretskyi
- Preceded by: Oleksii Sobolev (as Minister of Economy, Environment, and Agriculture)

Personal details
- Born: 1983 (age 42–43) Boryspil
- Party: Independent

Oleksandr Serhiyovich Kravchenko (Ukrainian: Олександр Сергійович Кравченко; born 1983) is a Ukrainian politician serving as minister of economy and environment since 2026. From 2021 to 2026, he served as managing partner of McKinsey & Company in Ukraine.
