= Oleksii Sobolev =

Ukrainian politician (born 1983)

- Олексій Соболєв
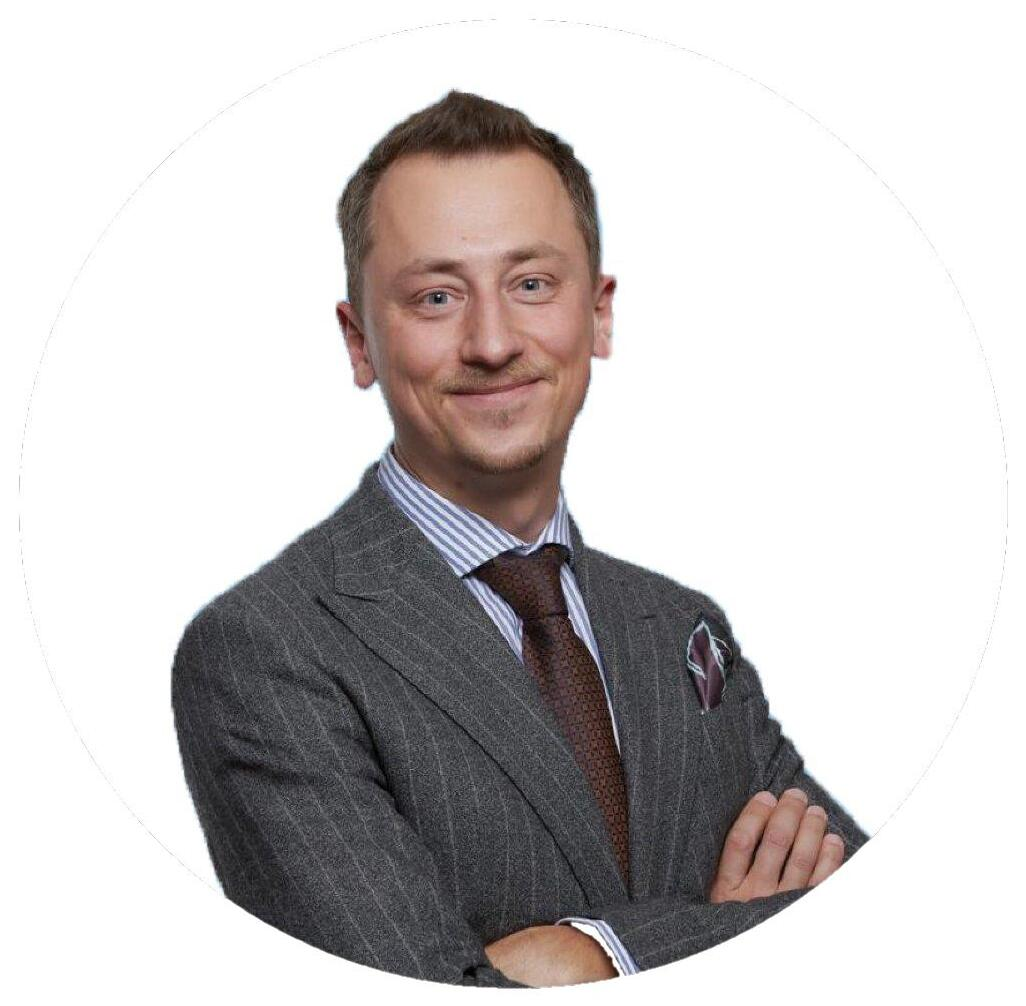
- Official Government portrait

Deputy head of the Office of the President of Ukraine
- Incumbent
- Assumed office 30 July 2026
- President: Volodymyr Zelenskyy

Minister of Economy, Environment and Agriculture
- In office 17 July 2025 – 16 July 2026
- Prime Minister: Yulia Svyrydenko
- Preceded by: Yulia Svyrydenko
- Succeeded by: Oleksandr Kravchenko (Minister of Economy and Ecology); Taras Vysotskyi (minister of Agrarian Policy)

Personal details
- Born: 1983 (age 42–43)

Oleksii Dmytrovych Sobolev (Ukrainian: Олексій Дмитрович Соболєв; born 1983) is a Ukrainian politician who served as minister of economy, environment and agriculture in 2025-2026. From 2022 to 2025, he served as First Deputy Minister of economy. On 30 July 2026, Sobolev was appointed Deputy head of the Office of the President of Ukraine.

== Early life and education ==
Oleksii Dmytrovych Sobolev was born in 1983. He holds a master's degree in finance from Kyiv National Economic University. He has also earned a Financial Analyst certificate from the CFA Institute (USA).

== Early career ==
Before entering government service, Sobolev worked in the financial and investment sector, including as an asset manager at Dragon Asset Management.

From 2015–2016, he served as an adviser to the Minister of Infrastructure of Ukraine, where he coordinated projects aimed at increasing transparency, implementing open data initiatives, and improving corporate governance of state-owned enterprises.

From 2016 to 2018, he led the Prozorro.Sale project at Transparency International Ukraine, coordinating the development of IT solutions for transparent sale of state assets. In 2018, he became the head of the state enterprise “Prozorro.Sale.”

In addition to his professional roles, Sobolev has been president of the CFA Society Ukraine, a community of financial analysts, and has served as Chair of the Advisory and Supervisory Group of CoST Ukraine, the Ukrainian chapter of the Construction Sector Transparency Initiative.

== Government service ==
In January 2023, Sobolev was appointed Deputy Minister of Economy of Ukraine for Digital Development, Digital Transformation and Digitalisation. He subsequently became First Deputy Minister of Economy of Ukraine in July 2024, where he was responsible for coordinating economic policy and digitalisation efforts. On 17 July 2025, he was appointed Minister of Economy, Environment and Agriculture of Ukraine, succeeding the previous officeholder in a government reshuffle under Prime Minister Yulia Svyrydenko and President Volodymyr Zelenskyy. He was dismissed on 16 July 2026 with the appointment of Oleksandr Kravchenko as Minster of Economy and Ecology and Taras Vysotskyi as Minister for Agrarian Policy respectively.

== Personal ==
He is Married, and a father of two daughters.
