= Valerie Ramey =

American economist

Valerie Ann Ramey (née Middleton) is an American economist who is currently Professor Emerita of Economics at the University of California, San Diego.

== Career and research ==
Ramey received a BA in economics and Spanish from the University of Arizona in 1981, and a PhD in economics from Stanford University in 1987, where her doctoral thesis was supervised by Robert Hall, John Taylor and Steven Durlauf. She was a research assistant and doctoral student at Stanford from 1983 to 1987 before becoming an assistant professor at the University of California, San Diego in 1987. At UCSD, she was appointed an associate professor in 1994, a full professor in 1998, and a Distinguished Professor in 2021.

Ramey has been an associate editor of the Quarterly Journal of Economics since 2014, and served as Vice President of the American Economic Association from 2017 to 2018. She is a research associate at the NBER, and has served on its Business Cycle Dating Committee since 2017. She is also a research fellow at the CEPR, and was appointed a Senior Fellow at the Hoover Institution in 2023. She was elected to the American Academy of Arts and Sciences in 2017, and was elected a Fellow of the Econometric Society in 2018.

Her research has been cited over 15,000 times according to Google Scholar, and has been quoted in CNN, the New York Times, and the Wall Street Journal. She was awarded the R. K. Cho Economics Prize in 2020. She published important works together with her husband Garey Ramey.
