= Volodymyr Makukha =

Ukrainian politician and diplomat

- Володимир Олексійович Макуха

Personal details
- Born: 7 June 1955 (age 71) Yaroslavl, Russia
- Education: Moscow State University, Faculty of Mechanics and Mathematics (1977); Kyiv Institute of National Economy (Candidate of Economic Sciences, 1984)
- Occupation: Politician, Diplomat, Economist
- Known for: Work in international economics, foreign investment, municipal development; participation in Ukrainian diplomacy and economic policy

Military service
- Rank: 1st rank civil servant (October 2007)
- Member of the National Security and Defense Council of Ukraine (Sept 2006 – Feb 2007)

Volodymyr Oleksiyovych Makukha (Ukrainian: Володимир Олексійович Макуха; b. 7 June 1955, Yaroslavl, Russia) is a Ukrainian politician and diplomat. Minister of Economy of Ukraine in the second Yanukovych government from 4 August 2006 to 21 March 2007. In 2006 he was the Ambassador of Ukraine in Japan.

== Education ==
In 1977 he graduated from the Faculty of Mechanics and Mathematics of Moscow State University with a degree in mathematics. From September 1977 to November 1980, engineer of the Scientific and Production Association "Energy". He graduated from the graduate school of the Kyiv Institute of National Economy (1980-1984), candidate of economic sciences.

== Professional career ==
From May 1984 to December 1991 he was the head of the sector of the Ukrainian branch of the All-Union Research Institute of Consumer Cooperation. From January 1992 to October 1996, he was the head of the department of the Research Institute of Social and Economic Problems of Kyiv. Improving his qualifications, he participated in internship programs of the National Forum Foundation (Washington, USA, 1993), Harvard University (United States, 1994), New York University (USA, 1995), Georgetown University (USA, 1996), as well as short-term internship programs in Germany, Sweden, the Netherlands, Spain.

From October 1996 to February 2000, Deputy Head of Department of the National Agency of Ukraine for Development and European Integration. From February 2000 to June 2000, Deputy Head of Department of the Ministry of Economy of Ukraine.

June 2000 - October 2003 - First Secretary, Economic Advisor, Embassy of Ukraine in the United States. October 2003 - July 2004 - Head of the Department of Economic Cooperation of the Ministry of Foreign Affairs of Ukraine. July 2004 - May 2006 - Deputy Minister of Foreign Affairs. Curator of the Economic Department, 5th Territorial Administration (Middle East and Africa), later the Development Department of the Diplomatic Service and the Monetary and Financial Department. Extraordinary and Plenipotentiary Envoy of the 1st class (January 2005).

May 2006 - August 2006 - Ambassador of Ukraine to Japan.

August 4, 2006 - March 21, 2007 - Minister of Economy of Ukraine. Member of the National Security and Defense Council of Ukraine (September 2006 - February 2007). June 20, 2007 appointed to the post of Deputy Minister of Fuel and Energy of Ukraine. 1st rank civil servant (October 2007).

The author of several dozen scientific papers on international economics, foreign investment, and municipal development.
