= Iuliia Mendel =

Ukrainian journalist

- Юлія Мендель
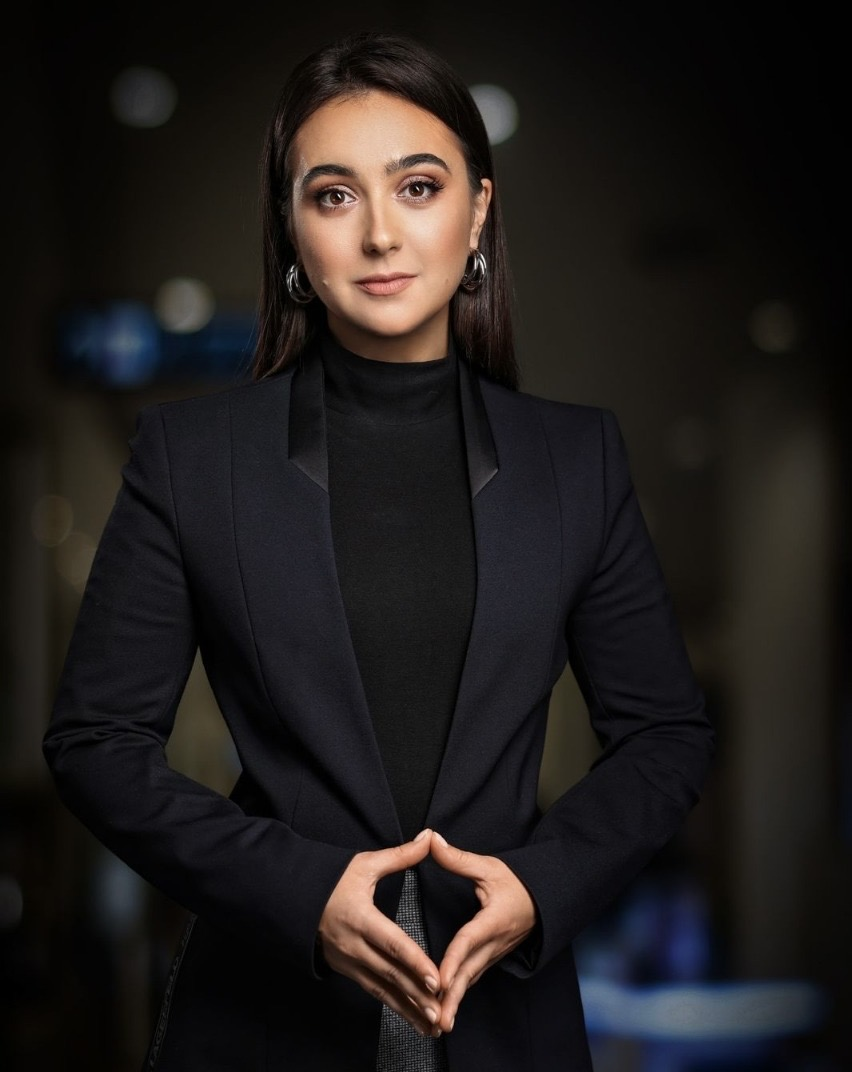

Press Secretary for the President of Ukraine
- In office 3 June 2019 – 9 July 2021
- President: Volodymyr Zelenskyy
- Preceded by: Sviatoslav Tseholko
- Succeeded by: Serhii Nykyforov

Personal details
- Born: 3 September 1986 (age 40) Henichesk, Kherson Oblast, Ukrainian SSR, Soviet Union
- Spouse: Pavlo Kukhta
- Education: Taras Shevchenko National University of Kyiv
- Occupation: Journalist; press secretary

Iuliia Volodymyrivna Mendel (Note: Transliterated as Yuliia or Yulia according to standard romanization) (Ukrainian: Юлія Володимирівна Мендель; born 3 September 1986) is a Ukrainian journalist. She was the press secretary in the administration of Ukrainian president Volodymyr Zelenskyy from June 2019 until July 2021, leaving the post several months before the 2022 Russian invasion of Ukraine. During her tenure, she was accused of being physically aggressive towards journalists. After leaving her role as press secretary, she released two memoirs: Each of Us Is President (July 2021), and The Fight of Our Lives - My Time With Zelenskyy, Ukraine's Battle for Democracy, and What it Means to the World (September 2022). In both books, she praised Zelenskyy and spoke positively of her time as press secretary. By 2025, Mendel was calling for an immediate ceasefire in the war, saying that Ukraine was "losing its nation" by continuing to resist Russia. In a 2026 interview with Tucker Carlson, she launched a scathing attack on Zelenskyy's character and made various accusations against him and his government. The interview was widely condemned in Ukraine, with journalists and politicians saying she offered no evidence and accusing her of spreading Russian disinformation.

== Biography ==
In June 2008, she graduated from the Institute of Philology of KNU, where she studied English and Polish, Ukrainian language and literature. In 2012, she defended her PhD thesis on The natural philosophical metalogy of Volodymyr Zatulyviter's lyrics in the context of poetry of 1970–90.

She worked as a journalist for ICTV, Espreso TV, 112 Ukraine and Inter TV channels. Iuliia Mendel became the first Ukrainian journalist to win the World Press Institute program.

Previously, she had worked as a Communications Consultant at the World Bank, and had contributed journalistic reporting for The New York Times. Mendel had worked as a journalist for several other media outlets that includes work for Politico Europe, the Atlantic Council, Vice, Spiegel Online, and Forbes.

In April 2016, she was the producer of the first documentary about post-traumatic stress disorder, Shell-Shocked: Ukraine's Trauma.

She trained abroad as part of the Lech Wałęsa Solidarity program, the THREAD program at Yale University, and took a course at the Warsaw Euro-Atlantic Summer Academy (WEASA).

=== Press secretary for the President of Ukraine ===
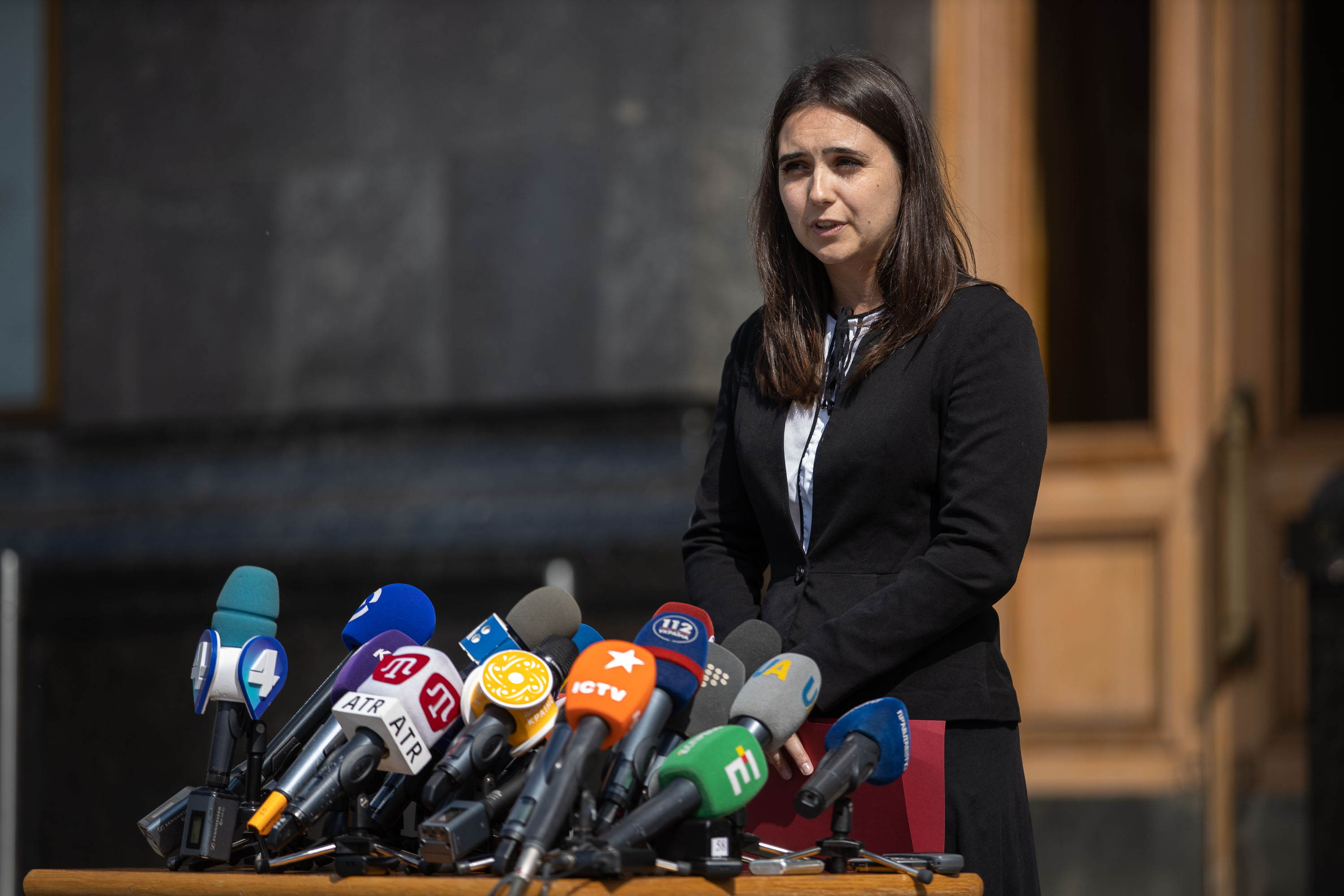
Yuliia Mendel as press secretary in June 2019

Mendel won a competition for press secretary for the President of Ukraine, Volodymyr Zelenskyy, on 30 April 2019. Winning against 4,000 other contestants, Mendel was appointed on 3 June 2019.

While she was press secretary, Zelenskyy gave interviews to leading European media, such as Le Monde, Der Spiegel, Gazeta Wyborcza, and he also appeared on the covers of Time, and The Guardian. In August 2020, Volodymyr Zelenskyy's interview with Euronews was published in 13 languages: English, Russian, German, French, Italian, Spanish, Portuguese, Hungarian, Greek, Albanian, Turkish, Arabic and Persian.

Iuliia Mendel also issued official statements from the president's office; for example about PrivatBank and Ukrainian oligarch Ihor Kolomoyskyi, where the Ukrainian President said that in the history of the bank "he will protect the interests of the state of Ukraine, the interests of every Ukrainian only", and that "Kolomoyskyi doesn’t have the authority to act on behalf of Ukraine or the Office of the President of Ukraine".

During her tenure, Mendel accompanied President Zelenskyy on all regional and international visits. She oversaw the information content of the official website of the President of Ukraine, president.gov.ua, social networks, and work with the media.

In December 2019, she participated in the Normandy Format talks in Paris.

In July 2020, The National Interest published an article by Iuliia Mendel entitled "Why Ukraine Really Is On the Road to Reform", where she talks about new government initiatives, Zelenskyy's presidency, land reform in Ukraine, and IMF tranches.

On March 15, 2021, she made her debut as the host of the View from the Bankova program on the Dom TV channel, the launch of which became known only on the day of the first broadcast. Later it turned out that Mendel was not the host of the program, but one of the speakers from the Office of the President of Ukraine and other colleagues in power would also appear on the air of the program.

==== Mistreatment of journalists ====
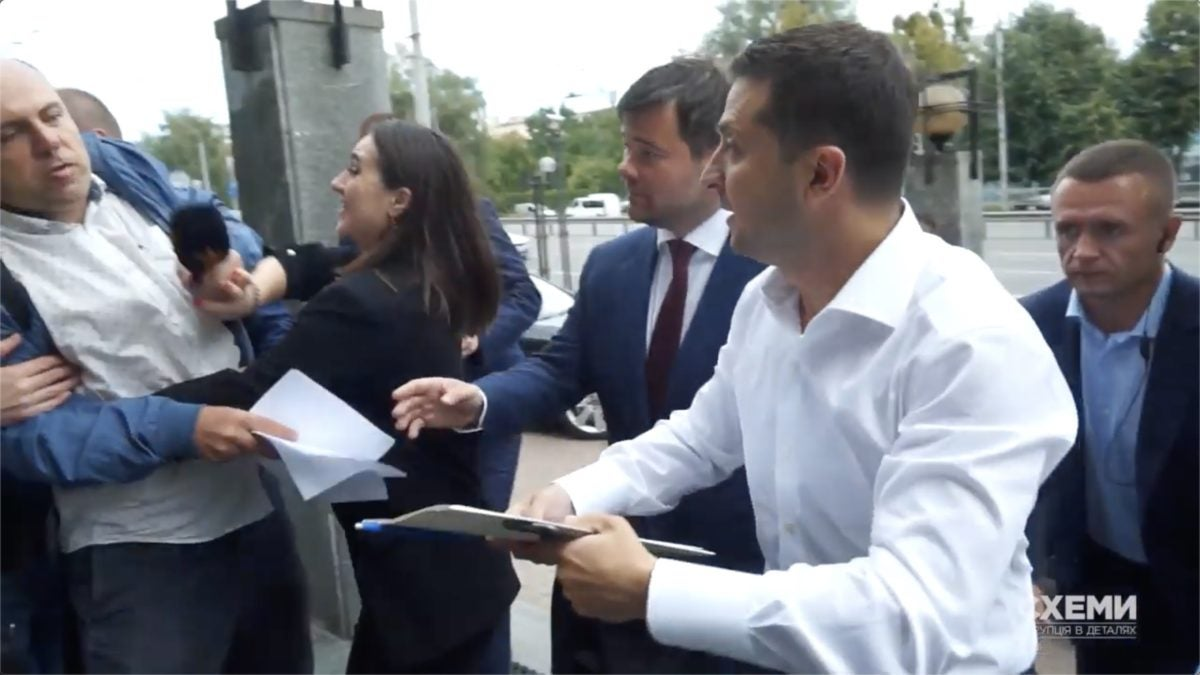
Mendel shoving journalist Serhiy Andrushko in September 2019

As press secretary to President Volodymyr Zelenskyy, Iuliia Mendel used physical force repeatedly against journalists, particularly those who were considered critical of the Office of the President. In September 2019, she shoved Radio Liberty correspondent Serhiy Andrushko in order to shield Zelenskyy from a question. A video of the incident was published by American correspondent Christopher Miller. Miller later reported Mendel treated him similarly, grabbing him by the arm and back and began pulling him away, saying "We need to get some coffee," even though Zelenskyy had agreed to answer his question. A video of this incident was published by journalists of the program Schemes. Natalia Shymkiv, a journalist from LB.ua, also reported "aggressive" shoving by Mendel.

On September 28, 2019, the National Union of Journalists of Ukraine called on the Office of the President and presidential press secretary Iuliia Mendel to "reconsider their attitude towards journalists" and to apologize for her inappropriate conduct. On September 30, 2019, a group of journalists known as "Initiative 34" issued a statement demanding Mendel's dismissal for unprofessional behavior toward journalists, while the "Media for Conscious Choice" movement called on Zelenskyy to publicly respond to the obstruction of journalists' work by his spokesperson.

During a press marathon on October 10, 2019, Zelenskyy defended his subordinate, but stated: "If this happens once more — we will part ways."

=== Post-press secretary activities ===
In April 2021, reports emerged that Mendel would resign as press secretary. In July, she was formally dismissed and replaced with Serhii Nykyforov. At the time, Mendel said her resignation was for health reasons.

On 11 July 2021, Mendel released her book Each of Us Is President in the Ukrainian publishing house Klub Simeinoho Dozvillia ("Family Leisure Club").

This book is an attempt to comprehend Ukrainian realities from the perspective of a Ukrainian woman born in the late 1980s, just before the collapse of the Soviet Union. Born in a Russian-speaking city, but for whom the Ukrainian language became native. One who deeply experienced all the fears, complexes, and limitations of the empire under Russia, but who studied from the Western world by attending dozens of courses and programs in Europe and the United States.

— Iuliia Mendel

From 17 July 2021 to 4 September 2021, she worked as a journalist on the program Velyka Deoliharkhizatsiia ("Great De-oligarchization") on the television channel Ukraine 24. She also worked as a journalist on the program Real Politics with Yevgeny Kiselyov on Ukraine 24.

Following the start of the full-scale Russian invasion of Ukraine in 2022, on 13 September 2022 Mendel released the English-language book The Fight of Our Lives with the subtitle My Time With Zelenskyy, Ukraine’s Battle for Democracy, and What it Means to the World. The book is dedicated to recollections of key events during the two years preceding the 2022 Russian invasion, ranging from meetings between Volodymyr Zelenskyy and Russian president Vladimir Putin, which Mendel attended, to responses to press inquiries following the infamous phone calls between US president, Donald Trump, and Zelenskyy. In her memoirs, Mendel also describes life in Ukraine during the war in detail. The book was published in the United States by Simon & Schuster. The Kyiv Independent described this book as "heaping praise" on Zelenskyy.

On 21 September, 2022, it was announced that the television production company Future Shack Entertainment, recently founded by former Universal Content Productions chairman Jeff Wachtel, had acquired the rights to Mendel's memoirs for a television series.

== Political views ==
In her books, Mendel praised Zelenskyy as a president who had transformed Ukraine for the better. Shortly after Donald Trump won the 2024 United States presidential election, Mendel wrote an opinion piece for the Kyiv Post. She said that "neither candidate offered an obvious victory for Ukraine", but added, "Trump's clearest stance on Ukraine was his call to 'end the war'". Mendel said that "Ukraine is weakening every day under the relentless pressure of this war" and argued that a ceasefire would allow Ukraine to build fortifications, bolster its military, partially restore its economy, re-open its borders, and hold elections.

Calls to pause the war, even temporarily, in order to preserve the nation are often dismissed as naive, usually by those far from the front line. Critics argue: "Putin will attack again." However, this reasoning appears to require us to justify staggering human losses and the potential disappearance of Ukraine on the basis of a hypothetical future threat. In essence: die now to avoid possibly dying later.

— Iuliia Mendel

In January 2025, Mendel published an article in Time, in which she called for an immediate ceasefire in Ukraine, because the war was "draining us to our core". Mendel said "Russia has turned a third of Ukraine into a living hell. Imagine a life where Russian drones hunt people as if on a safari daily, as they do in my home region of Kherson". She argued Ukraine was "losing its nation": citizens fleeing as refugees, civilians and soldiers dying, and cities and infrastructure being destroyed.

I urge our allies, our leaders, and above all my fellow Ukrainians: consider the value of a cease-fire. Let us embrace this difficult path not as capitulation, but as a necessary step toward securing Ukraine's future. We owe it to our nation, to those who have fallen, and to those who will inherit the Ukraine we seek to protect.

— Iuliia Mendel

After Zelenskyy said he was ready to negotiate directly with Russian president Putin in February 2025, Mendel called this a "very realistic approach". She said it was unrealistic "to exchange so many lives of Ukrainians ... for the illusion that NATO will invite us [to join] at some point". In an interview for France 24, Mendel said "the majority of people in Ukraine definitely agree" on the need for a ceasefire, and that those living under Russian shelling are the most eager for "a ceasefire under any circumstances".

In her article in the Kyiv Post on 19 February 2025, Mendel wrote that Europe had reached a "critical moment" after the re-election of Trump as president of the United States. In her view, "Europe has found itself between the need to assert its role in global security and the practical fulfillment of its military-political obligations. The debate over peacekeepers in Ukraine concerns not only military presence, but also Europe's identity and role in international affairs, especially in the post-Cold War world, where traditional alliances are being reconsidered".

On 31 January 2026, Mendel accused former presidential office head Andriy Yermak of practising black magic involving cemeteries and water used to wash corpses.

=== Tucker Carlson interview ===
In May 2026, Mendel gave a lengthy interview to American conservative journalist Tucker Carlson. In her interview, she sharply criticized her former employer Volodymyr Zelenskyy and his government. The ex-press secretary stated that Ukraine's government is corrupt and called Zelenskyy one of the main obstacles to peace, accusing him of prolonging the war for his own benefit. Mendel called Zelenskyy a "dictator", saying he had demanded "Goebbels-style propaganda", would not let people leave the country, and punished critics by sending them to fight at the front. She described Zelenskyy as emotionally unstable, like a "teddy bear" on camera but a "grizzly bear" who "destroys" people "when the lights go out", and said it was an "open secret" that he used drugs, although she had never witnessed it. Mendel also described Zelenskyy as "low-educated, unqualified, and low depth".

Mendel alleged that Zelenskyy had agreed to surrender the Donbas region to Russia during the 2022 Istanbul negotiations, although she was not part of these negotiations and had no connection to them. She repeated a Russian disinformation claim that former British prime minister Boris Johnson prevented an early peace agreement. At the end of the interview, she addressed Russian president Vladimir Putin in Russian, saying she did not have his "life experience", but urged him to end the human safari with drones against residents of Kherson.

The interview was released almost simultaneously with the notification of suspicion in a corruption case to former head of the Office of the President Andriy Yermak, which increased public attention to the context of her statements.

The interview drew widespread criticism in Ukraine. Ukrainian journalists and media professionals called the interview "trash", accused Mendel of inventing stories, and condemned her for blaming Zelenskyy for the war. Ukrainska Pravda said that Mendel did not give any evidence for her claim about handing over Donbas other than citing conversations with unnamed people who were representing Ukraine in the Istanbul talks. The Kyiv Independent said that Carlson did not challenge any of her claims, and that Mendel's remarks contradicted her earlier praise of Zelenskyy and echoed pro-Russian narratives. The Kyiv Independent said that Mendel told stories of Ukrainians dying of hunger and cold in their homes in the winter of 2025–2026 without mentioning the Russian attacks on Ukrainian energy infrastructure. Regarding claims that Ukraine is a dictatorship, the newspaper wrote that "even in the midst of full-scale war, Ukrainians have staged protests against unpopular government initiatives, while independent Ukrainian media have reported in-depth on major corruption scandals, including those involving members of Zelensky's own inner circle". Asked about whether Russia could be trusted to uphold a peace agreement, Mendel said the "human safari" should be stopped "whether there is a peace deal or not".

The Kyiv Post fact-checked some of Mendel's accusations. It said that there was no evidence of officials being arrested or sent to fight on the front merely for criticizing Zelenskyy; that mobilization and border closures are a result of wartime martial law restrictions signed before Zelenskyy became president; and that Ukraine enshrined its goal of joining NATO in its Constitution before Zelenskyy became president.

Foreign Minister of Ukraine Andrii Sybiha commented: "It is vile when such individuals are willing to humiliate their own state and grovel before Russian propaganda for the sake of 'fame'." The Office of the President of Ukraine rejected Mendel's claims, stating:

This lady did not participate in the negotiations, did not participate in decision-making, has been not all there for some time, and it is not worth commenting on who said what to her and whether it actually happened.

In an October 2026 interview with The Daily Telegraph, she said Zelenskyy held "40%" of responsibility for the war while Putin held "60%". The Telegraph called such statements "a signature part of the Kremlin's disinformation campaign to undermine Western support for Kyiv". She said she had left her position as Zelenskyy's press secretary because of what she said was Zelenskyy's "erratic" behaviour, although she had originally said she had resigned for "health reasons"; Zelenskyy's office denied this and said she had left "because she was emotionally unstable and in constant conflicts with journalists". She called for Ukraine to cede territory and abandon its goal of entering NATO. The Telegraph said her statements "often echo or align with pro-Kremlin arguments", and wrote that she did not mention the many ceasefires and negotiations proposed by Zelenskyy since 2025, which Russia has rejected in favour of "maximalist demands for territorial concessions".

== Investigative journalism ==
=== Coverage of corruption ===
In 2016, Mendel published an article in Politico about corruption in Ukrainian universities, in which she said that she had been forced to pay a $200 bribe to her academic supervisor in order to defend her dissertation at university. The professor accused by Mendel, Yuriy Kovaliv of Kyiv National University, filed a lawsuit against her and Politico in 2016 to protect his honor, dignity and business reputation. By a ruling of the Kherson City Court on 1 April 2019, the information about bribery disseminated by Mendel was found to be false; the court ordered Mendel and the publication to issue a retraction. On 6 June 2019, Mendel appealed the ruling. In court, her lawyer argued that in the article "Mendel did not indicate either the first name or surname of her academic supervisor, did not intend to humiliate his honor, dignity or business reputation, and did not claim that the professor had taken money", although during the hearing in the court of first instance Mendel herself had stated the opposite. On 15 October 2020, the Kherson Court of Appeal recognized the bribery accusation as "Mendel's value judgment", granted her claims and overturned the lower court's decision. Professor Kovaliv's claims were dismissed

=== Article on Joe Biden's involvement in Viktor Shokin's dismissal ===
On 1 May 2019, The New York Times published an article by Kenneth P. Vogel and Iuliia Mendel. The article stated that in 2016 Vice President Joe Biden had helped push for the removal of Ukraine's prosecutor general Viktor Shokin, who was criticized in the United States for obstructing anti-corruption reform. In the article, the journalists suggested that a possible motive for Biden's actions could have been an investigation into the Ukrainian energy company Burisma Holdings, whose board included Hunter Biden, Joe Biden's son.

In June 2019, CNN released a story about the conflict of interest of Mendel, who wrote a story for The New York Times in May while she was a candidate for the government position and kept it secret from the newspaper that she applied for the position. According to Ari Isaacman Bevacqua, a spokesperson for The Times, "had Mendel informed editors of her job application, they would not have given her that assignment, and we would have stopped working with her immediately given this serious conflict of interest". Iuliia Mendel denied any conflict of interest by stating that the vacancy for the position of spokesperson was announced on April 30 when the story was ready.

== Recognition ==
Mendel became the first Ukrainian journalist to win the World Press Institute program.

In autumn 2019, she was included in the list of the 100 most influential women in Ukraine according to Focus magazine.

In March 2021, Mendel was included in the top 100 most successful women in Ukraine according to The New Voice of Ukraine magazine, in the "Government officials" category.

In 2023, she became a laureate of the international World Influencers and Bloggers Awards.

== Personal life ==
In 2022, she married the former Deputy Minister of Economy, Pavlo Kukhta (Honcharuk Government). They live in the US as of 2026.
