= Serhii Nykyforov =

Ukrainian journalist (born 1986)

- Сергій Никифоров
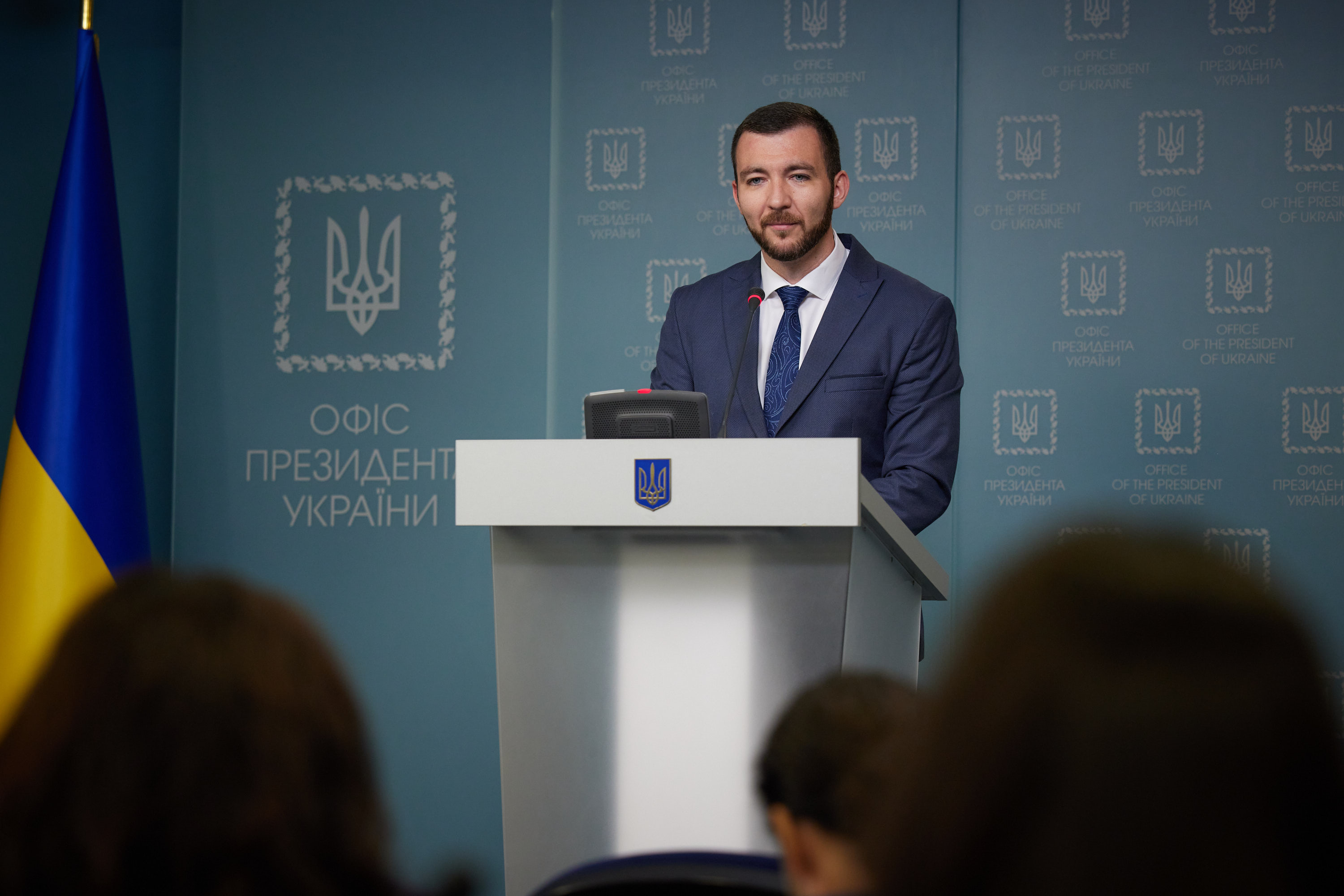

Press secretary of the President of Ukraine
- Incumbent
- Assumed office 9 July 2021
- President: Volodymyr Zelenskyy
- Preceded by: Iuliia Mendel

Personal details
- Born: 10 July 1986 (age 40) Kryvyi Rih, Dnipropetrovsk Oblast, Ukrainian SSR
- Education: Taras Shevchenko National University of Kyiv
- Occupation: journalist, spokesperson

Serhii Serhiyovych Nykyforov (Ukrainian: Сергій Сергійович Никифоров) is a press secretary in the administration of Ukrainian president Volodymyr Zelenskyy.

== Early life ==
Serhii Nykyforov was born in Kryvyi Rih.

He graduated from the Faculty of Journalism of the Taras Shevchenko National University of Kyiv.

Nykyforov worked as a correspondent of the TV channels First National (2007–2011) and Euronews (2011–2017), and he worked as television presenter of the TV channels Ukraine and Ukraine 24 (2018–2021).
