= Yeon-Koo Che =

American economist

Academic background
- Education: Stanford University; University of Toronto; Seoul National University
- Doctoral advisor: Paul Milgrom

Academic work
- Discipline: Microeconomic theory
- Institutions: Columbia University
- Website: Information at IDEAS / RePEc

Yeon-Koo Che (Korean: 최연구) is an American economist. He is the Kelvin J. Lancaster Professor of Economic Theory at Columbia University, a position he held since 2009. Prior to joining Columbia in 2005, he was a professor at University of Wisconsin-Madison.

== Education ==
Che earned his BA in economics from Seoul National University in 1984, his MA from University of Toronto in 1986. He received his Ph.D. from Stanford University in 1991, with Paul Milgrom serving his main advisor.

== Academic career ==
Che's research concerns microeconomic theory, with special focus on markets, auctions, contracts and matching, dynamic information acquisition. His research has been supported by National Science Foundation grants and National Research Foundation grants from Korea. He is Fellow of Econometric Society (elected 2009) and Fellow of Economic Theory (elected 2014) for the Society of Advancement of Economic Theory. He is a member of Council of Game Theory Society (elected 2017). He has served as editor of Journal of Industrial Economics, associate editor of Econometrica, Journal of Economic Theory, and Games and Economic Behavior. He was the inaugural recipient in 2008 of the R. K. Cho Economics Prize, and the recipient of 2009 KAEA-MK Prize. He has given numerous Keynote addresses, including the Jacob Marschak Lecture at Australasian Meeting of Econometric Society (2016), Asian Meeting of Econometric Society (2018), and Latin American Meeting of Econometric Society (2018).

== Research ==
Che has made significant contributions to the theory of market design, particularly in the areas of auction theory, contract theory and matching theory. His early work contributes to the theory of mechanism and auction design: scoring-rule auctions, auctions with budget constraints, collusion-proof mechanism design, research contest, the incomplete contract paradigm for organization theory, and the matching theory in the context of college admission and school choice. His recent research agenda includes data-driven digital economy and dynamic information acquisition by economic agents. His current research projects explore the implications of data-driven economic decision making and resource allocation for welfare and distributional consequences.

=== Auction theory and mechanism design ===
Many public-works contracts are awarded via auctions where bidders compete in multiple dimensions of performances. He developed a theory of scoring-rule auctions to model such situations. In a scoring-rule auction, bidders propose multi-attribute bids say quality $q$ and price $p$, and the auctioneer (procurer) uses a scoring function $s(q,p)$ to evaluate the bid, and awards a contract to the bidder whose proposal score is the highest. His paper shows that the optimal outcome can be implemented using a scoring function that downplays quality relative to price to intensify price competition. His second-score format anticipates the practice of adjusting payments based on advertiser's click-through rates commonly used in the Internet ad auctions.

He wrote a series of papers with Ian Gale on the role of budget constraints in auctions and auctions design. They show that bidders differing in budgets act fundamentally differently from bidders differing in their valuations of goods, leading to important implications for efficiency and revenue. The well-known revenue equivalence theorem fails for instance.

=== Contract theory ===
Many key institutions such as property rights, authority, decision rights, and communication channels are difficult to explain in light of the Coase theorem: parties can simply bargain to agree on an efficient action and enforce that agreement through a contract. To explain those institutions, one thus need to explain why such a contractual approach is not possible or too costly to work. The incomplete contracts paradigm pioneered by Sanford J. Grossman, Oliver D. Hart, and John H. Moore argues that contracts are often incomplete and unable to provide adequate incentives for crucial relationship-specific investments needed for transactions, thus rationalizing organizational intervention such as ownership rights and authority, etc. His paper with Don Hausch provides a rigorous foundation (see Segal 1999 and Hart and Moore 1999 for alternative foundation) for this paradigm, identifying investment externalities ("cooperativeness") and renegotiability of contracts in the face of mutually beneficial ex post gains as two conditions rationalizing organizational interventions.

=== Matching theory ===
His research studied the matching markets particularly in the context of assignment of students to public schools, particularly focusing on the stability and fairness of the assignment outcome as well as the incentives of market participants. His works show a large market size helps to achieve a stable outcome and to resolve tradeoffs between efficiency on one side of the market (e.g., students) and the fairness. His pioneering work on college admissions shows how colleges' strategic behavior in the decentralized admission system can lead to an inefficient and unfair outcome.

== Selected publications ==
- Che, Yeon-Koo (1993). "Design Competition Through Multidimensional Auctions". The RAND Journal of Economics. 24 (4): 668–680. ISSN 0741-6261. JSTOR 2555752.
- Che, Yeon-Koo; Gale, Ian L. (1998). "Caps on Political Lobbying". The American Economic Review. 88 (3): 643–651. ISSN 0002-8282. JSTOR 116854.
- Che, Yeon-Koo; Gale, Ian (1998). "Standard Auctions with Financially Constrained Bidders". Review of Economic Studies. 65 (1): 1–21. doi:10.1111/1467-937X.00033. eISSN 1467-937X. ISSN 0034-6527.
- Che, Yeon-Koo; Hausch, Donald B. (1999). "Cooperative Investments and the Value of Contracting". American Economic Review. 89 (1): 125–147. doi:10.1257/aer.89.1.125. ISSN 0002-8282.
- Che, Yeon-Koo; Yoo, Seung-Weon (2001). "Optimal Incentives for Teams". American Economic Review. 91 (3): 525–541. doi:10.1257/aer.91.3.525. ISSN 0002-8282.
- Che, Yeon-Koo; Gale, Ian (2003). "Optimal Design of Research Contests". American Economic Review. 93 (3): 646–671. doi:10.1257/000282803322157025. ISSN 0002-8282.
