= BioFach =

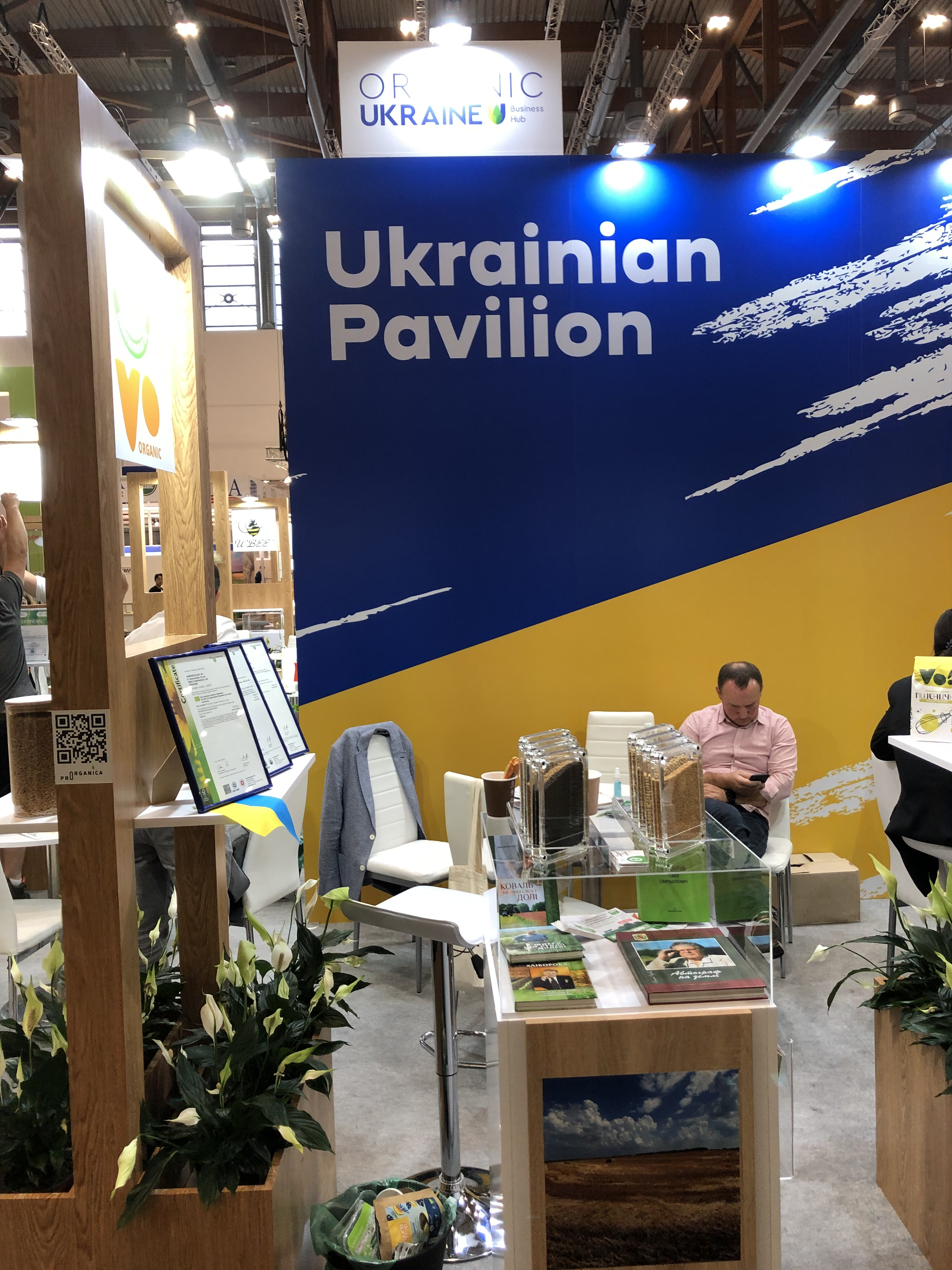
Ukrainian exhibitor at Biofach 2022

BioFach is the world's largest trade fair for organic food and agriculture. It is held each year in the month of February, in Nuremberg, Germany. It brings together exhibitors and trade visitors from around 130 countries.

== History ==
The first BioFach occurred in 1990. It was organized by a group of people who felt that organic producers were excluded from other trade fairs and marketing opportunities. 197 exhibitors and over 2,000 visitors attended that first fair. By 1999 the fair had relocated to its current home in Nuremberg and grown to over 1,200 exhibitors and over 15,000 visitors. In 2001 NurembergMesse took over organization of the fair.

As BioFach has grown, it has become cost prohibitive for smaller companies to exhibit there, somewhat defeating the original purpose.
