= Yuriy Gorodnichenko =

Ukrainian professor (born 1978)

- Born: 1978 (age 47–48)
- Occupations: Economist, professor

Academic background
- Education: B.A. (1999), M.A. (2001) National University of Kyiv-Mohyla Academy M.A. (2004), Ph.D. (2007) University of Michigan

Academic work
- Institutions: University of California, Berkeley; National Bureau of Economic Research; Institute for the Study of Labor; Centre for Economic Policy Research

Yuriy Gorodnichenko (Ukrainian: Юрій Городніченко) is an economist and Quantedge Presidential professor at the University of California, Berkeley.

Gorodnichenko is also a visiting scholar at the Federal Reserve Bank of San Francisco, a faculty research associate at the National Bureau of Economic Research, a research fellow at the Institute for the Study of Labor., a leader of the Ukrainian initiative at CEPR, a member of the Scientific Advisory Council at the Kiel Institute for the World Economy. Gorodnichenko was the chair of the International Academic Board of the Kyiv School of Economics.

Gorodnichenko is a coeditor of the American Economic Review. Previously, he was a coeditor of the Review of Economics and Statistics and Journal of Monetary Economics. Gorodnichenko also served on the editorial board of Visnyk of the National Bank of Ukraine. Gorodnichenko is a cofounder of VoxUkraine. Gorodnichenko is a member of the executive committee of the Association for Comparative Economic Studies (ACES).

A significant part of his research has been about monetary policy (effects, optimal design, inflation targeting), fiscal policy (countercyclical policy, government spending multipliers), taxation (tax evasion, inequality), economic growth (long-run determinants, globalization, innovation, financial frictions), and business cycles. Gorodnichenko coauthored several proposals on the post-war reconstruction of Ukraine. His work was published in leading economics journals such as American Economic Review, Journal of Political Economy, Quarterly Journal of Economics, Econometrica, Review of Economic Studies, Journal of European Economic Association, and many others.

Gorodnichenko received awards for his teaching and research, including Sloan Research Fellowship, NSF CAREER award, World Junior Prize in Monetary Economics and Finance, Excellence Award in Global Economic Affairs, fellow of the Econometric Society, R.K. Cho Prize in Economics, and others. Gorodnichenko's research was funded by the National Science Foundation, Alfred P. Sloan Foundation, Smith Richardson Foundation, National Bureau of Economic Research, Social Security Administration, Google, and other agencies and firms.

RePEc ranks Gorodnichenko as the top young economist in the world.
