= Ministry of Economy (Ukraine) =

Government ministry of Ukraine

Ministry of Economic Development and Trade of Ukraine
- Міністерство економрозвитку і торгівлі

Agency overview
- Formed: May 1991 (as Ministry of Economy of Ukraine)
- Preceding agencies: State Committee on Economy; State Committee on Material and Technical Support
- Jurisdiction: Government of Ukraine
- Headquarters: 12/2, M. Hrushevsky st, Kyiv, Ukraine, 01008
- Minister responsible: Oleksandr Kravchenko, Minister of Economy and Ecology
- Child agencies: State Agency of Ukraine of corporate rights and property; State Agency of Reserves of Ukraine; State Agency of investment and national projects management; State Agency of energy efficiency and energy conservation in Ukraine; State Service of Statistics of Ukraine; State Service of Export Control
- Website: Official website

The Ministry for Development of Economy and Trade (Ukrainian: Міністерство економрозвитку і торгівлі України) is the main authority in the system of central government of Ukraine responsible for formation and realization of state economic and social development policies (business economics); regulation of consumer prices; industrial, investment and trade economic policies; development of entrepreneurship; technical regulation and security of consumer rights; inter-agency coordination of economic and social cooperation of Ukraine with the European Union. In 2019-2020 it also encompassed functions of the Ministry of Agrarian Policy and Food, and since 17 July 2025 ministries of Agrarian Policy and Environment have been merged into its structure.

The ministry is based on the former Ministry of Economy, taking its origin from the Planning Commission of the Ukrainian SSR. Over the years it included such former ministries as Ministry of Trade and Ministry of Foreign Economic Relations. Activities of the current ministry are coordinated by the Cabinet of Ministers of Ukraine.

== Structure ==
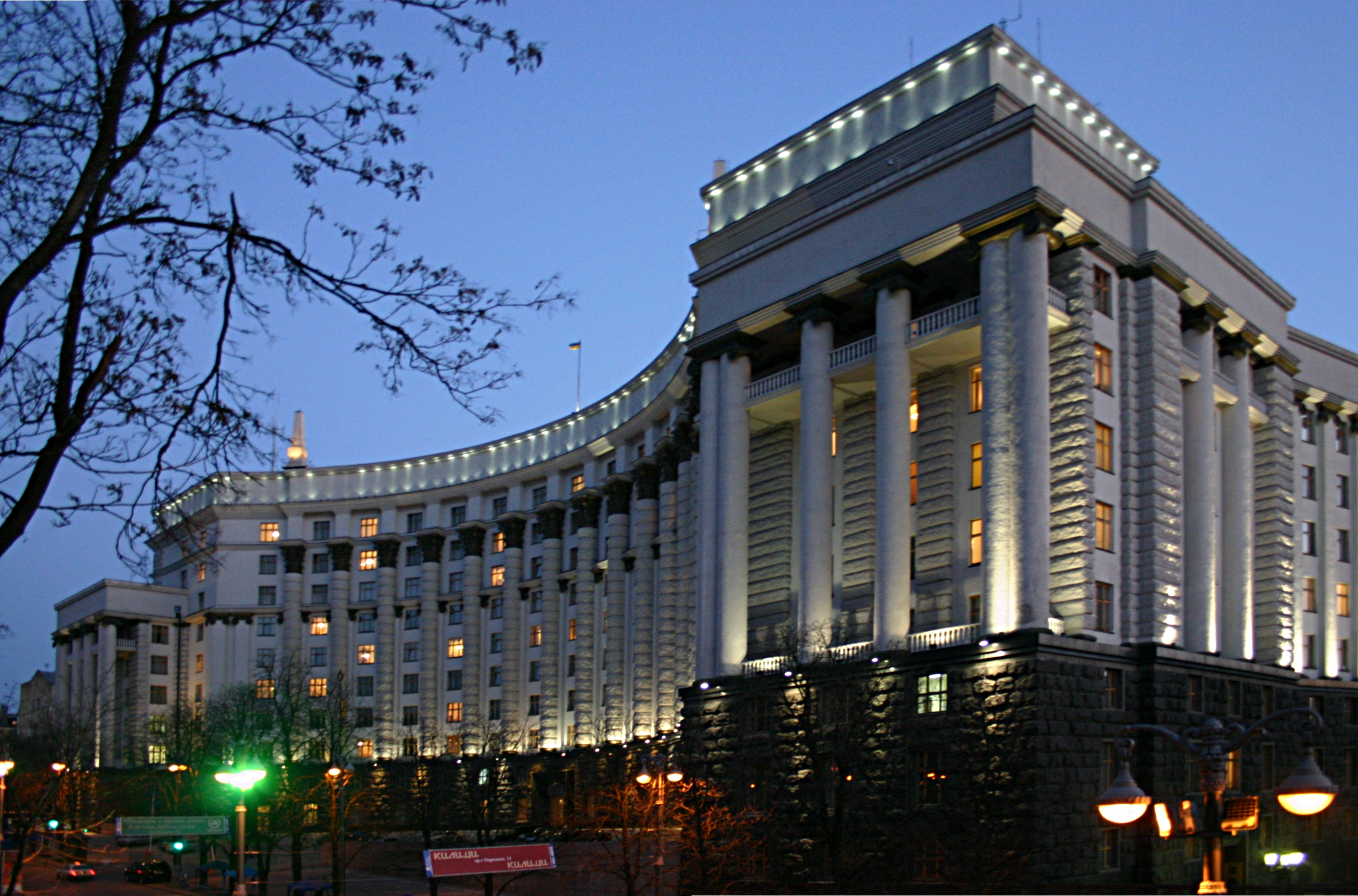
Government Building in Hrushevsky st., Kyiv

The ministry consists of the central body of ministry headed by its leadership composed of a minister, first deputy and other deputies to assist the minister. Ministry elects several state administrations representatives to coordinate operations of the government companies.

Between September and mid-December 2020 the ministry was also responsible for Ukraine's agricultural policy. On 29 August 2019 the Honcharuk Government merged the Ministry of Agrarian Policy and Food into the ministry. On 17 December 2020 the agricultural ministry was resurrected when Roman Leshchenko was appointed as Minister of Agricultural Policy and Food of the Shmyhal Government.

=== State agencies ===
- State Agency of Ukraine in governing the state corporate rights and properties
- State Agency of Reserves of Ukraine
- State Agency in investments and national projects of Ukraine (Ukrproject)
- State Agency in energy efficiency and energy conservation of Ukraine
- State Service of Statistics of Ukraine
- State Service of Export Control of Ukraine
- State Inspection in Protection of Consumers' Rights
- National Accreditation Agency of Ukraine

(until 2011 State Committee for Technical Regulation and Consumer Policy)

== List of ministers ==
=== Ukrainian People's Republic (1917-1918) ===
Title	Name of minister	Term of office	
Title	Name of minister	Start	End
General Secretary for Trade and Industry	Vsevolod Holubovych	20 November 1917	9 January 1918
Minister of Trade and Industry	Vsevolod Holubovych	9 January 1918	18 January 1918
Minister of Trade and Industry	Ivan Feshchenko-Chopivskyi	February 1918	April 1918

=== Ukrainian State (1918) ===
Title	Name of minister	Term of office	
Title	Name of minister	Start	End
Minister of Trade and Industry	Serhiy Hutnyk	3 May 1918	18 October 1918
Minister of Trade and Industry	Serhiy Mering	24 October 1918	14 December 1918

=== West Ukrainian People's Republic ===
Title	Name of minister	Term of office	
Title	Name of minister	Start	End
State Secretary for Trade and Industry	Yaroslav Lytvynovych	9 November 1918	4 January 1919
State Secretary for Trade and Industry	Sydir Holubovych	4 January 1919	9 June 1919

=== Ukrainian People's Republic (restored) ===
Title	Name of minister	Term of office	
Title	Name of minister	Start	End
Minister of Trade and Industry	Serhiy Ostapenko	26 December 1918	13 February 1919
Minister of National Economy	Ivan Feshchenko-Chopivskyi	13 February 1919	9 April 1919
Minister of National Economy	Teofan Cherkaskyi	9 April 1919	26 May 1919
Minister of National Economy	vacant		
Minister of National Economy	Mykola Shadlun	29 August 1919	26 May 1920
Minister of National Economy	Yevhen Arkhypenko	26 May 1920	10 November 1920

=== Soviet Ukraine ===
Trade

Name of ministry	Name of minister	Term of office	
Name of ministry	Name of minister	Start	End
People's Commissariat for Internal Trade	Oleksandr Genkin	June 1924	January 1925
People's Commissariat for Internal Trade	Mikhail Chernov	January 1925	May 1929
People's Commissariat for Internal Trade	Izrail Weitzer	July 1929	December 1930
People's Commissariat for Supplies	Izrail Weitzer	July 1929	December 1930
People's Commissariat for Supplies	Mikhail Mayorov	25 December 1930	9 February 1932
People's Commissariat for Supplies	Ivan Sapov	9 February 1932	15 December 1932
People's Commissariat for Supplies	Alfred Rozit	15 December 1932	March 1934
People's Commissariat for Supplies	Arkadiy Kiselyov	May 1934	December 1934
People's Commissariat for Internal Trade	Ivan Sapov	15 December 1934	28 July 1935
People's Commissariat for Internal Trade	Heorhiy Bohatyriov	28 July 1935	1937
People's Commissariat for Internal Trade	Ivan Lukashov	1937	1938
People's Commissariat for Internal Trade	Panteleymon Borisov	1938	March 1944
People's Commissariat for Internal Trade	Illia Drofa	March 1944	15 March 1946
Ministry of Trade	Illia Drofa	15 March 1946	3 January 1947
Ministry of Trade	Ivan Lukashov	3 January 1947	21 August 1950
Ministry of Trade	Vasyl Zaporozhets	21 August 1950	1953
Ministry of Trade	Heorhiy Sakhnovskyi	10 April 1953	7 August 1970
Ministry of Trade	Volodymyr Starunskyi	7 August 1970	23 November 1987
Ministry of Trade	Anatoliy Statynov	23 November 1987	14 December 1989
Ministry of Trade	Oleh Slyepichev	14 December 1989	December 1991

=== Ukraine (since 1991) ===
Trade

Name of ministry	Name of minister	Term of office	
Name of ministry	Name of minister	Start	End
Ministry of Trade	Volodymyr Tymofyeyev	December 1991	February 1992

Foreign economic relations

Name of ministry	Name of minister	Term of office	
Name of ministry	Name of minister	Start	End
Ministry of Foreign Economic Relations	Valeriy Kravchenko	June 1991	March 1992
Ministry of Foreign Economic Relations and Trade	Anatoliy Voronkov	March 1992	October 1992
Ministry of Foreign Economic Relations and Trade	Ivan Herts	October 1992	September 1993
Ministry of Foreign Economic Relations and Trade	Oleh Slyepichev	September 1993	August 1994
Ministry of Foreign Economic Relations	Serhiy Osyka	August 1994	July 1995
Ministry of Foreign Economic Relations and Trade	Serhiy Osyka	July 1995	January 1999
Ministry of Foreign Economic Relations and Trade	Andriy Honcharuk	January 1999	January 2000

Economy

Name of ministry	Name of minister	Term of office	
Name of ministry	Name of minister	Start	End
Ministry of Economy of UkrSSR	Anatoliy Minchenko	May 21, 1991	August 24, 1991
Ministry of Economy	Anatoliy Minchenko	August 24, 1991	March 5, 1992
Ministry of Economy	Volodymyr Lanovyi	March 5, 1992	July 11, 1992
Ministry of Economy	Viktor Pynzenyk	October 27, 1992	April 13, 1993
Ministry of Economy	Yuriy Bannikov	April 13, 1993	August 30, 1993
Ministry of Economy	Roman Shpek	August 30, 1993	July 3, 1995
Ministry of Economy	Vasyl Hureyev	July 3, 1995	February 25, 1997
Ministry of Economy	Yuriy Yekhanurov	February 26, 1997	July 25, 1997
Ministry of Economy	Viktor Suslov	July 25, 1997	April 21, 1998
Ministry of Economy	Vasyl Rohovyi	April 24, 1998	December 31, 1999
Ministry of Economy	Serhiy Tyhipko	December 31, 1999	July 5, 2000
Ministry of Economy	Vasyl Rohovyi	August 9, 2000	June 25, 2001
Ministry of Economy	Oleksandr Shlapak	July 10, 2001	August 30, 2001
Ministry of Economy and European Integration	Oleksandr Shlapak	August 30, 2001	November 30, 2002
Ministry of Economy and European Integration	Valeriy Khoroshkovskiy	November 30, 2002	January 11, 2004
Ministry of Economy and European Integration	Mykola Derkach	January 11, 2004	February 3, 2005
Ministry of Economy and European Integration	Serhiy Teryokhin	February 4, 2005	May 16, 2005
Ministry of Economy	Serhiy Teryokhin	May 16, 2005	September 27, 2005
Ministry of Economy	Arseniy Yatsenyuk	September 27, 2005	August 4, 2006
Ministry of Economy	Volodymyr Makukha	August 4, 2006	March 21, 2007
Ministry of Economy	Anatoliy Kinakh	March 21, 2007	December 18, 2007
Ministry of Economy	Bohdan Danylyshyn	December 18, 2007	March 11, 2010
Ministry of Economy	Vasyl Tsushko	March 11, 2010	December 9, 2010
Ministry of Economic; Development and Trade	Andriy Klyuyev	December 9, 2010	February 14, 2012
Ministry of Economic; Development and Trade	Petro Poroshenko	March 23, 2012	December 24, 2012
Ministry of Economic; Development and Trade	Ihor Prasolov	December 24, 2012	February 27, 2014
Ministry of Economic; Development and Trade	Pavlo Sheremeta	February 27, 2014	September 2, 2014
Ministry of Economic; Development and Trade	Aivaras Abromavičius	December 2, 2014	February 3, 2016
Ministry of Economic; Development and Trade	Stepan Kubiv	April 14, 2016	August 29, 2019
Minister of Economic Development, Trade and Agriculture	Tymofiy Mylovanov	August 29, 2019	14 March 2020
Minister of Economic Development, Trade and Agriculture	Ihor Petrashko	17 March 2020	18 May 2021
Minister of Economy	Oleksiy Liubchenko	20 May 2021	3 November 2021
Minister of Economic Development	Yulia Svyrydenko	4 November 2021	17 July 2025
Minister of Economy, Agrarian Policy and Natural Resources	Oleksiy Sobolev	17 July 2025	16 July 2026
Minister of Economy and Ecology	Oleksandr Kravchenko	16 July 2026	Incumbent

== See also ==
- Cabinet of Ministers of Ukraine
