= Ihor Petrashko =

Ukrainian economist and politician (born 1975)

- Ігор Петрашко
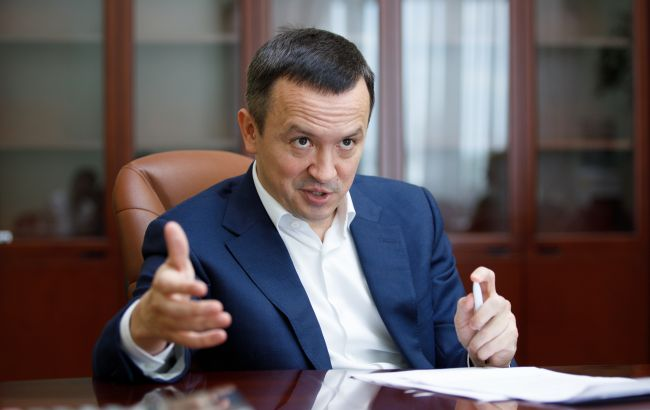
- Petrashko in 2020

Minister of Economic Development and Trade
- In office 17 March 2020 – 18 May 2021
- President: Volodymyr Zelenskyy
- Prime Minister: Denys Shmyhal
- Preceded by: Pavlo Kukhta (Acting)
- Succeeded by: Oleksiy Liubchenko

Personal details
- Born: 6 October 1975 (age 50) Stryi, Ukrainian SSR, Soviet Union (now Ukraine)
- Education: Lviv Polytechnic; Vanderbilt University; University of Lviv
- Occupation: Economist

Ihor Rostyslavovych Petrashko (Ukrainian: Ігор Ростиславович Петрашко; born 6 October 1975) is a US educated economist who served as Minister of Economic Development and Trade of Ukraine from 17 March 2020, until 18 May 2021.

== Biography ==
Born 6 October 1975, in Stryi, Petrashko studied at the Lviv Polytechnic. In 2001, he received an MBA from the Vanderbilt University (Nashville, TN, United States).

Petrashko worked in leading US and International companies such as Globalspec (a leading engineering company based in Albany, NY), Intelsat (an International Satellite Communication company based in Washington, DC)

Petrashko worked as a Partner and Head of Transaction Advisory Services at Ernst & Young. and Managing Director and Head of Investment Banking Division at Troika Dialog Investment company. From Dec 2012 to April 2013 Petrashko briefly headed a corporate business department of Sberbank in Kyiv, Ukraine (after Troika Dialog has been acquired by Sberbank).

Since April 2013, Petrashko has been working in the private sector for several companies and in roles with responsibilities in corporate finance, strategic advisory and special situations consulting.

On 17 March 2020, Petrashko was appointed as the Minister of Economic Development, Trade and Agriculture. On 17 December 2020, this ministry lost its responsibility for Ukraine's agricultural policy due to creation of separate Ministry of Agricultural Policy and Food.

On 14 May 2021, Petrashko offered his resignation as Minister. On 18 May 2021, the Ukrainian parliament dismissed him as Minister.

Since his resignation, Petrashko has been working in private equity with focus on energy.

== See also ==
- Shmyhal Government

Political offices
Preceded by Pavlo Kukhta (Acting)	Minister of Economic Development and Trade; 2020–2021	Succeeded by To be announced
