= National Accreditation Agency of Ukraine =

The National Accreditation Agency of Ukraine (abbr. NAAU) is the Ukrainian national accreditation body, which claims that it works in accordance with international standard ISO/IEC 17011 and documents of international organizations (EA, IAF, ILAC). The government agency is part of the Ministry of Economic Development and Trade.

In November 2009, NAAU under Chairmanship of Mr. Dmytro Zorgach, have joined a Bilateral Agreement (BLA, for persons) with EA.
