= Vasyl Rohovyi =

Ukrainian politician

Vasyl Vasyliovych Rohovyi (Ukrainian: Василь Васильович Роговий; born 2 March 1953) is a Ukrainian politician, bureaucrat. Minister of Economy of Ukraine (1998–1999, 2000–2001).

== Biography ==
Born 2 March 1953 in the village of Myrivka (Kaharlyk Raion, Kyiv Oblast).

In 1974 graduated from Kyiv National Economic University, Faculty of Economics, labor economist. Candidate of Sciences in Economics. Author of over 20 scientific papers.

Since 1974 he worked as an engineer-economist Kyiv Production Association, military service.

In 1980 he worked at the Institute of Economics of the Academy of Sciences of Ukraine.

- 1988–1994 — Working in the Cabinet of Ministers of Ukraine.
- 1994–1998 — First Deputy Minister of Economy of Ukraine.
- 1998–1999 — Minister of Economy of Ukraine.
- 2000 — First Deputy Head of Presidential Administration of Ukraine.
- 2000–2001 — Minister of Economy of Ukraine.
- 2001–2002 — Deputy Prime Minister of Ukraine.
- 2003–2004 — Advisor to the President of Ukraine, Ukraine Commissioner for the Commonwealth of Independent States.
- 2004–2005 — Deputy Secretary, 2005–2007 — Deputy secretary for economic, social and environmental security of the National Security and Defense Council of Ukraine.

He was awarded the Order of Merit III (August 1998), II (August 2006) degrees, the Order of Danylo Halytsky (February 2008). Honored Economist of Ukraine (since February 2003).

A civil servant rank 1 (October 1994).
