= State Fiscal Service of Ukraine =

State Fiscal Service Державна фіскальна службa
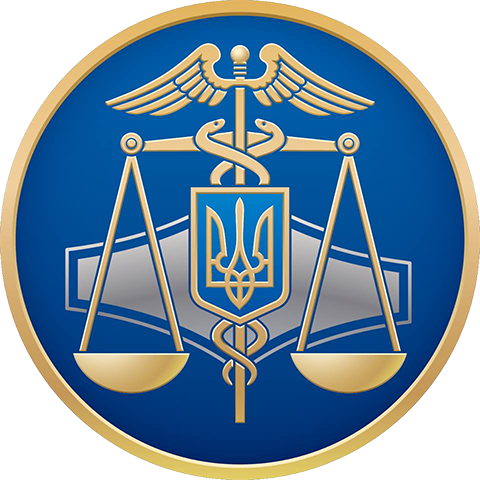

Agency overview
- Formed: May 21, 2014; 12 years ago
- Preceding agency: Ministry of Revenues & Duties of Ukraine
- Dissolved: 1 January 2022
- Superseding agency: State Tax Service; State Customs Service; Bureau of Economic Security

Jurisdictional structure
- Operations jurisdiction: Ukraine
- Specialist jurisdictions: Customs, excise, gambling; Taxation

Operational structure
- Headquarters: 8, Lvivska Square, Kyiv, Ukraine, 04053
- Agency executive: Vadym Melnyk, Head of State Fiscal Service
- Parent agency: Ministry of Finance (Ukraine)

Website
- tax.gov.ua/en/

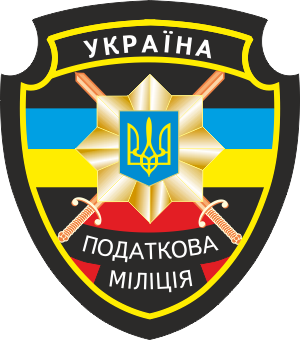
Logo of the Tax Militsiya

The State Fiscal Service (Ukrainian: Державна фіскальна служба, romanized: Derzhavna fiskalna sluzhba) or SFS (Ukrainian: ДФС, romanized: DFS) is a former government agency of Ukraine that in 2014 replaced the Ministry of Revenues and Duties. The former ministry was created in 2012 by the Second Azarov Government through merging the State Tax Service and the State Customs Service.

In December 2018, the Cabinet of Ministers under the Petro Poroshenko administration adopted a resolution on the reorganization of the State Fiscal Service by dividing it into the State Tax Service and the State Customs Service. In August 2020, the newly formed State Tax Service of Ukraine started its functioning.

== Agency emblem ==
The emblem of the State Fiscal Service of Ukraine is an image of a silver hryvnia (UAH) with cut off part, which rests on the bowl lever scales, symbolizing a fair, measured levying taxes. In the middle of the logo is small State Emblem of Ukraine, placed on the scales integrated - the symbol of trade and economy. The emblem is in the middle of a round blue shield with gold border, symbolizing the protection of state interests.

== History of SFS ==
Ministry of Revenues and Duties of Ukraine was established by the Azarov Government 24 December 2012 bringing together the State Tax Service of Ukraine and State Customs Service of Ukraine.

The head of the Ministry was Oleksandr Klymenko, who left Ukraine (escaped) after Yanukovych team lost its power in the beginning of 2014. Now, he's put on the wanted list on charges of corruption.

After winning Eurorevolutuion and Euromaidan new government declared a desire to destroy the old corruption schemes. March 1, 2014 Ministry of income and charges was abolished. The State Tax Ministry and the State Customs Service were renewed and subordinated to the Ministry of Finance (Ukraine).

On 27 May 2014, at the meeting of the Cabinet of Ministers of Ukraine the decision was taken that the Ministry of Revenues and Duties is to be renamed into the State Fiscal Service and be subordinated the Ministry of Finance. On 21 May 2014, the State Fiscal Service of Ukraine was formed.

== Establishing of SFS ==
On 21 May 2014, a statement about the State Fiscal Service was adopted. The State Fiscal Service of Ukraine was determined as the central body of executive power with activity directed and coordinated by the Cabinet of Ministers of Ukraine and implements:

1. State tax policy,
2. State policy in the sphere of state customs,
3. State policy on administration of united contribution to the obligatory state social insurance (united social contribution),
4. State policy in a sphere of fighting violations while implementing tax and customs legislation.

SFS has the authority directly and through the created regional offices. There are units of the tax police in the SFS and its regional bodies.

To agree to resolve issues within the competence of SFS and discussing areas of activity the SFS-board can be formed.

SFS is a legal entity, has a seal with the State Emblem of Ukraine, custom forms, and accounts in the Treasury. State Fiscal Service, as expected, combining the powers of tax authorities, customs and financial police. It entered into conflict with previous intentions of the Prime Minister Yatsenyuk, under whose leadership a political decision to restore the function separated by tax and customs services was taken.

== Human resource ==
=== Senior Executives ===
The SFS is headed by the Head of State Fiscal Service. There are two deputies of the Head of State Fiscal Service. Both Head of SFS and deputies are appointed and dismissed by the Prime Minister of Ukraine with the consent of the Cabinet of Ministers of Ukraine.

=== Staff ===
According to the decree of the Cabinet of Ministers of Ukraine Nº178 from 11 June 2014 the boundary number of employees was 56,640 people. The central office consisted of 2,186 employees. At the end of 2015, 345 employees of the administrative board were dismissed according to the Law of Ukraine "On cleaning power". Within the framework of human resources reform the staff of the SFS was reduced by 30% pursuant to the Order of the Cabinet of Ministers. The boundary number of employees was reduced to 41,178 people. The central office consists of 1,530 employees.

== Main duties ==
The key responsibilities: the state tax policy, the customs policy, the public policy of the administration of the single social payment, the fight against tax and customs crimes.

== International Relations ==
In 2014, the SFS signed the Memorandum of Understanding with the EBA and the American Chamber of Commerce. In 2015-2016, the SFS intensified the exchange of pre-arrival information with the customs bodies of other states within the framework of projects like the Twinning and the PRINEX.

SFS signed the Memorandum of Understanding with the World Customs Organization regarding the establishment of the World Customs Organization Regional Dog Training Centre in Khmelnitskyi city.

SFS and the State Customs Committee of Azerbaijan signed the Protocol on interaction between the agencies in the fight against customs offenses related to the movement of goods by air. At the 20th General Assembly of the Intra-European Organisation of Tax Administrations (IOTA), which was held in Romania, the Head of SFS of Ukraine Roman Nasirov was elected as President of IOTA for 2016/2017. Thus the 21st General Assembly of IOTA will take place in Ukraine.

In order to support the University of the Ukrainian Tax Administration, which was destroyed by a Russian attack, the University of Finance of the Federal State of North Rhine-Westphalia, Germany, have agreed to cooperate to support teaching, especially on international tax topics.

== Deliverables ==
Establishment of Tax ombudsman Office. Implementation of wide range of e-services: taxpayer's cabinet, e-VAT administration, e-excise on petrol administration, e-queue for customs clearance, automatic system of customs risk management, etc. Unification all regulatory authorities and customs offices into the electronic system "Single Window".

Results of the work of the SFS in 2016: revenues to the budgets of all levels increased by $6 billion in 2016.

== Chair persons ==
=== State Tax Service ===
Logo of the State Tax Service

Chief of State Tax Inspection (Deputy Minister of Finance of Ukraine)

- 1990 - 1992 Vitaliy Ilyin
- 1992 - 1993 Viktor Tenyuk
- 1993 - 1996 Vitaliy Ilyin

Chair person of State Tax Administration

- 1996 - 2002 Mykola Azarov
- 2002 - 2004 Yuriy Kravchenko
- 2004 - 2005 Fedir Yaroshenko
- 2005 - 2006 Oleksandr Kireyev
- 2006 - 2007 Anatoliy Brezvin
- 2007 - 2010 Serhiy Buryak
- 2010 - 2010 Viktor Sheibut (acting)
- 2010 - 2010 Oleksandr Papayika

Chair person of State Tax Service

- 2010 - 2011 Vitaliy Zakharchenko
- 2011 - 2012 Oleksandr Klymenko

=== State Customs Service ===
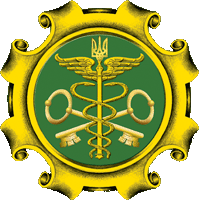
Logo of the State Customs Service

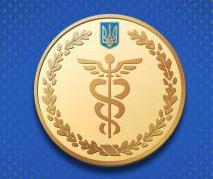
Logo of the Ministry of Revenues and Duties

Chairperson of State Custom Committee

- 1991 - 1993 Oleksiy Koval
- 1993 - 1994 Anatoliy Kolos
- 1994 - 1994 Eduard Miroshnichenko (acting)
- 1994 - 1995 Yuriy Kravchenko
- 1995 - 1996 Leonid Derkach

Chairperson of State Customs Service

- 1996 - 1998 Leonid Derkach
- 1998 - 2001 Yuriy Solovkov
- 2001 - 2005 Mykola Kalensky
- 2005 - 2005 Volodymyr Skomarovsky
- 2005 - 2007 Oleksandr Yehorov
- 2007 - 2009 Valeriy Khoroshkovsky
- 2009 - 2010 Anatoliy Makarenko
- 2010 - 2012 Ihor Kalietnik

=== Ministry of Revenues and Duties ===
- 2012 - 2014 Oleksandr Klymenko

=== State Fiscal Service ===
- 2014 - 2016 Ihor Bilous
- 2016–present Roman Nasirov (Nasirov was suspend on 3 March 2017 pending an embezzlement investigation)
- 2017 - 2018 Myroslav Prodan (acting)
- 2018 - 2019 Oleksandr Vlasov (Although December 2018 court decision reinstated Nasirov in his function, Vlasov remained the head of the organisation)
- 2020 – 2021 Vadym Melnyk

== Reorganization ==
In December 2018, Ukraine pledged to [the IMF] to consolidate the State fiscal service into two separate legal entities by the end of April 2019: the Tax Service and the Customs Service, both of which should report to the Minister of Finance.

On 18 December 2018, the Cabinet of Ministers adopted a resolution on the reorganization of the State Fiscal Service by dividing it into the State Tax and State Customs services. The draft resolution provides for the division of the SFS into 'State Tax Service' (which will include the tax police units) and 'State Customs Service' as separate Central Executive bodies. The Cabinet of Ministers will direct and coordinate the activities of these services through the Minister of Finance of Ukraine.

On 6 March 2019, the Cabinet of Ministers approved the regulation on tax and customs service.

On 3 October 2020, the (new) State Tax Service formed its territorial subdivisions. The same day the organisation claimed "the final steps to ensure its functioning" would be taken "by the end of the year."
