= 17 December 2013 Russian–Ukrainian action plan =

2013 defunct proposed agreement

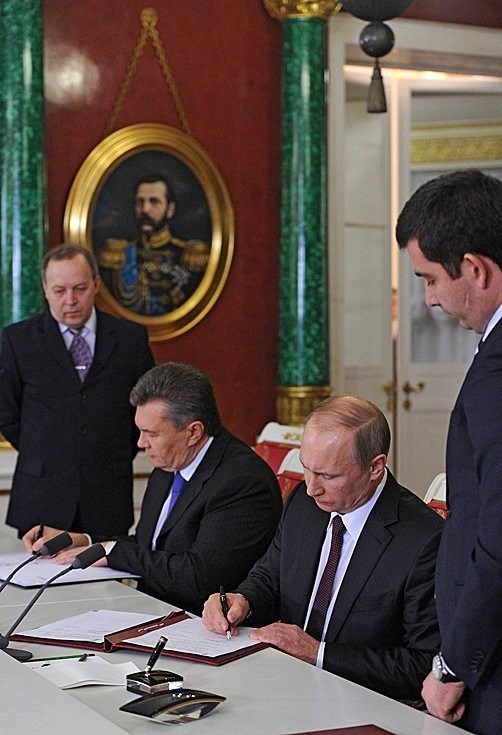
- Russian president Putin and Ukrainian president Yanukovych signing a joint bilateral programme of celebrations for the 200th anniversary of the birth of Taras Shevchenko in 2014 on 17 December 2013
- Type: Action plan
- Signed: December 17, 2013
- Location: Moscow, Russia
- Signatories: (Russia) Vladimir Putin (Ukraine) Viktor Yanukovych
- Languages: Russian and Ukrainian

The 17 December 2013 Russian–Ukrainian action plan was a de facto defunct proposed agreement between the Russian president Vladimir Putin and former Ukrainian president Viktor Yanukovych publicized on 17 December 2013 whereby Russia would buy $15 billion of Ukrainian eurobonds to be issued by Ukraine and that the cost of Russian natural gas supplied to Ukraine would be lowered to $268 per 1,000 cubic metres (the price was more than $400 at the time). The treaty was signed amid the escalating Euromaidan movement which sought closer ties between Ukraine and the European Union. The interest rate on the loan would be renegotiated every three months, based on a verbal agreement between the two leaders.

The proposed agreement is de facto defunct since Russia has halted its purchase of the never issued eurobonds since the ousting of President Yanukovich of 22 February 2014 and in April 2014, the Russian natural gas discount was cancelled.

Since December 2015, Ukraine has defaulted on the $3 billion debt payment to Russia that was part of the action plan.

== Background ==
In mid-August 2013, Russia changed its customs regulations on imports from Ukraine. (Note: On 20 December 2013, Ukrainian prime minister Mykola Azarov stated that this should be seen as "Russia was trying to defend its interests".) Ukrainian Industrial Policy Minister Mykhailo Korolenko stated on 18 December 2013 that because of this Ukraine's exported had dropped by $1.4 billion (or a 10% year-on-year decrease through the first 10 months of the year). The State Statistics Service of Ukraine reported in November 2013 that in comparison with the same months of 2012 industrial production in Ukraine in October 2013 had fallen by 4.9 percent, in September 2013 by 5.6 percent and in August 2013 by 5.4 percent (and that the industrial production in Ukraine in 2012 total had fallen by 1.8 percent). In June 2010 (a few months after the 2010 Ukrainian–Russian Naval Base for Natural Gas treaty), Ukraine paid Gazprom (the Russian government controls 50.002% of shares in Gazprom) around $234 per 1,000 cubic metres of natural gas. In January 2013, Ukraine paid $430 per 1,000 cubic metres. And at the time of the 17 December 2013 agreement, Ukraine still paid more than $400. Since August 2011, Ukraine seeks to reduce imports of Russian natural gas by two-thirds (compared with 2010) by 2016. Natural gas is Ukraine's biggest import at present and is the main cause of the country's structural trade deficit.

Whatever the reason might have been; the economy of Ukraine was approaching a bad state by late 2013. and had poor solvency.

On 21 November 2013, a Ukrainian government decree preparations for signing an Association Agreement and Deep and Comprehensive Free Trade Agreement with the European Union (EU). Despite that in the months before Ukrainian president Viktor Yanukovych had urged the parliament to adopt laws so that Ukraine would meet the EU's criteria. On 25 September 2013 Chairman of the Verkhovna Rada (Parliament of Ukraine) Volodymyr Rybak stated that he was sure that his parliament would pass all the laws needed to fit the EU criteria for the Association Agreement since, except for the Communist Party of Ukraine, "The Verkhovna Rada has united around these bills".

The reason given for the (stop preparations for signing EU-agreement) decree was that the previous months Ukraine had experienced "a drop in industrial production and our relations with CIS countries". The government also assured "Ukraine will resume preparing the agreement when the drop in industrial production and our relations with CIS countries are compensated by the European market". During two years of negotiations, Ukraine did not raise the issue of large, unconditional grants from the EU and IMF until the eve of the Vilnius summit. According to Ukrainian prime minister Mykola Azarov "the extremely harsh conditions" of an IMF loan (presented by the IMF on 20 November 2013), which included big budget cuts and a 40% increase in gas bills, had been the last argument in favor of the Ukrainian government's decision to suspend preparations for signing the Association Agreement. On 7 December 2013 the IMF clarified that it was not insisting on a single-stage increase in natural gas tariffs in Ukraine by 40%, but recommended that they be gradually raised to an economically justified level while compensating the poorest segments of the population for the losses from such an increase by strengthening targeted social assistance. The same day IMF Resident Representative in Ukraine Jerome Vacher stated that this particular IMF loan is worth US$4 billion and that it would be linked with "policy, which would remove disproportions and stimulated growth". (Note: On 10 December, President Yanukovych stated "We will certainly resume the IMF negotiations. If there are conditions that suit us, we will take that path". However, Yanukovych also (once again) stated that the conditions put forward by the IMF were unacceptable "I had a conversation with U.S. Vice President Joseph Biden, who told me that the issue of the IMF loan has almost been solved, but I told him that if the conditions remained... we did not need such loans".)

The decision to put off signing the EU Association Agreement led to massive, ongoing protests in Ukraine (for closer ties between Ukraine and the EU) that began in the night of 21 November 2013 when up to 2,000 protesters gathered at Kyiv's Maidan Nezalezhnosti. And that had risen to 400,000–800,000 protesters demonstrating in Kyiv on the weekends of 1 December and 8 December 2013.

== Negotiation ==
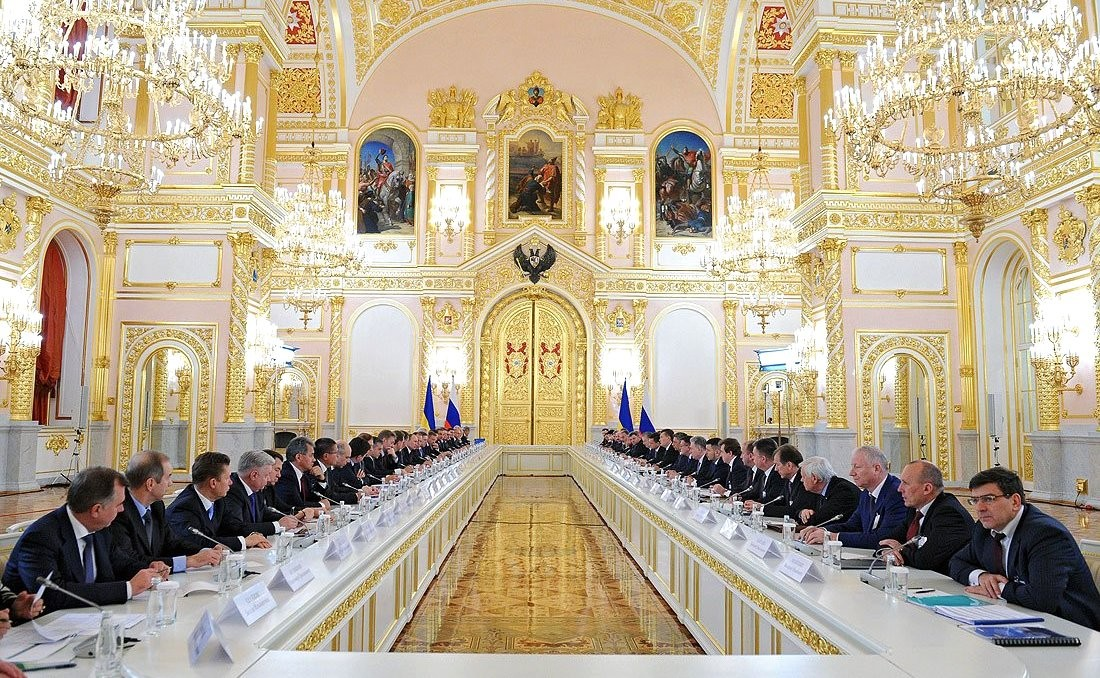
Meeting of the Russian-Ukrainian Interstate Commission on 17 December 2013

Russian president Vladimir Putin and his Ukrainian counterpart Viktor Yanukovych held the sixth "interstate consultation" on 17 December in Moscow. Yanukovych flew to Moscow on the private jet airliner of Ukrainian oligarch (and alleged financier and chieftain of Yanukovych's Party of Regions) Rinat Akhmetov. After the meeting, Yanukovych stated "We've prepared a joint action plan to resolve trade and economic restrictions, a so-called road map that will significantly improve performance in this area" and added this would benefit the entire sectors of the economies of the two countries. "Favourable conditions for the about 1.5 million people from Ukraine that are working in Russia" were also discussed. According to President Putin and Russian presidential press secretary Dmitry Peskov this deal was "not tied to any conditions" and Ukraine's possible accession to the Customs Union of Belarus, Kazakhstan, and Russia was not addressed. Peskov also added "it is our principled position not to interfere in Ukraine's affairs" and accused other countries of doing the opposite. According to President Yanukovych, the trade situation between Russia and Ukraine required urgent intervention, and that it should be coordinated with other Commonwealth of Independent States (CIS) countries. He also added referring to Russia–Ukraine relations, "We'll have to learn lessons for the future and not to repeat such mistakes". And President Yanukovych also stated that Ukraine and Russia should strengthen cross-border and inter-regional cooperation "which create convenient conditions for the people".

The next day Prime Minister Mykola Azarov stated that without the deal with Russia "bankruptcy and social collapse would have awaited Ukraine". He also added that there was no way Ukraine could have signed the EU Association Agreement as Ukraine would have had to accept unfeasibly stringent IMF conditions for economic reform. The protest on Maidan Nezalezhnosti continued on 18 December 2013. He also stated "Nothing is threatening stability of the financial-economic situation in Ukraine now. Not a single economic factor".

On 19 December 2013, Russian President Putin stated about the (which he described as an "act of brotherly love" (Note: On 20 December 2013, Chairman of the Verkhovna Rada Volodymyr Rybak commented on this statement ""If we are brothers, then I take the money and give it to you as a brother, but when they issue a loan at an interest rate that must be repaid these are economic relations between the two states".)) 17 December deal between Russia and Ukraine "This is not at all linked to (protests at) Maidan, nor with the EU-talks that Ukraine leads... We're just seeing that Ukraine is in dire straits and we should support her".

On 25 September 2014, Ukraine opened a criminal probe against (in December 2013) Minister of Finance of Ukraine Yuriy Kolobov; he is accused of illegally transferring a $450,000 fee to Russia's state-run VTB Capital as a kickback for the 17 December 2013 Ukrainian–Russian action plan.

== The agreement ==
The "joint action plan" consisted of the Russian National Wealth Fund buying $15 billion of Ukrainian eurobonds and the lowering of the cost of Russian natural gas supplied to Ukraine to $268 per 1,000 cubic metres (Ukraine paid $400 at the time). The discount in gas was set contingent upon a quarterly review to be approved by both parties, upon which Russia reserved the right to rescind the discount. As part of the action plan, Russia committed itself to the restoration its customs regulations on imports from Ukraine that had existed before mid-August 2013. The lowering of the natural gas price was done by amending the agreement that had ended the 2009 Russia–Ukraine gas dispute. According to President Putin, this amendment would enable Gazprom to lower the price of natural gas for Ukraine. The natural gas prices was to be reviewed every three months. According to Russian finance minister Anton Siluanov, the exact terms of the Russian purchase of Ukrainian eurobonds would be determined later, but a portion of the eurobonds, "significantly less, will be placed this year". Siluanov added that the bonds would be placed on the Irish Stock Exchange under English law with 5% interest per bond. The bonds will mature in two years. (Note: According to The Financial Times, this is a short period; the newspaper literally wrote "The bonds will mature in just two years," and that "International Monetary Fund loans are much cheaper and last longer") On 23 December 2013, Siluanov stated that Russia would not be trading the bonds. Russia can demand early repayment of the loan at any time. The terms of the action plan included the condition that if Ukraine's total state debt would exceed 60% of its annual gross domestic product (GDP) Russian could demand early repayment.

== Ratification and criticism ==
=== Voting ===
In response to the agreement, the opposition parties Batkivshchyna, UDAR and Svoboda immediately blocked parliament in order to defer its ratification since they quickly denounced the plan.

=== Criticism ===
On 17 December, opposition leader Vitaly Klitschko told the approximately 50,000 people Euromaidan-protest on Kyiv's Maidan Nezalezhnosti "He [President Yanukovich] has given up Ukraine's national interests, given up independence and prospects for a better life for every Ukrainian".

On 18 December 2013, BBC News reported that the deal "will not fix Ukraine's deeper economic problems" in an article called Russian bailout masks Ukraine's economic mess. The same day The Financial Times noted that the treaty could be bad for Gazprom, which was already planning to cut its overall investment in 2014, "With an additional burden from Ukraine, the state firm may be even less able to serve as a motor for Russia's sluggish economy".

== De facto collapse of the agreement ==
Russian president Putin told his Dmitry Medvedev's Cabinet on 29 January (and just after the resignation of the second Azarov Government) that "it's reasonable" to wait until a successor cabinet was installed in Ukraine before extending more aid to Ukraine. Furthermore, Russian prime minister Dmitry Medvedev stated Ukraine wasn't paying its natural gas bills even with the lower price, which "seriously changes the situation". Meanwhile, Serhiy Arbuzov (who had replaced Mykola Azarov as acting Ukrainian prime minister) believed Russia would be its second $2 billion tranche "in the nearest future".

Naftogaz Ukrainy blamed the delay in payment of Russian natural gas on a lack of payment of local "enterprises in the heating utilities sector".

On 17 February, Russian finance minister Anton Siluanov stated that Russia would release the next $2 billion tranche of the 17 December 2013 $15 billion loan to Ukraine the same week. But on 18 February Ukraine decided not to issue these $2 billion eurobond.

Since the ousting of President Yanukovich of 22 February 2014, Russia had halted its purchase of eurobonds (after it had on 23 December 2013 Russia transferred $3 billion in payment for the eurobonds to Ukraine).

On 1 April 2014, Gazprom cancelled the Russian natural gas discount as agreed in the treaty because Ukraine's debt to the company had risen to $1.7 billion since 2013.

After trilateral months of talks between the European Union, Ukraine and Russia, a deal was reached on 30 October 2014 in which Ukraine agreed to pay (in advance) $378 per 1,000 cubic metres to the end of 2014, and $365 in the first quarter (ending on 31 March) of 2015.

Since December 2015, Ukraine refuses to and hence de facto defaults on the $3 billion debt payment to Russia that was part of the action plan. On 17 February 2016, Russia filed a lawsuit against Ukraine at Her Majesty's High Court of Justice in England over this debt.

== Effects ==
On 23 December 2013, Russia transferred $3 billion in payment for the eurobonds to Ukraine. But so far trade between Ukraine and Russia has not been normalized.

=== Economic effect ===
According to the plan, "protective measures" of both countries should be lifted so that "normalized trade" can resume.

The days after the 17 December 2013 agreement (Ukraine's natural gas importer) Naftogaz did cut its imports of Russian gas to a minimum. But on 9 January 2014, Ukrainian Energy and Coal Industry Minister Eduard Stavytsky stated that Ukraine (at that time) will buy only Russian natural gas "because it's currently the most profitable". The same day Naftogaz and Russia's Gazprom signed a supplement to the Russian-Ukrainian gas contract, setting the price of natural gas for Ukraine in the first quarter of 2014 at $268.5 per 1,000 cubic meters. A representative of European Commissioner for Energy Günther Oettinger stated soon after that shipping gas from EU member states represents an opportunity for Ukraine to increase its competitiveness and the security of its natural gas supplies. (Note: Since November 2012, Ukraine was diversifying its suppliers of imported natural gas. On 18 June 2013 Prime Minister Mykola Azarov stated "We currently buy gas from RWE and pump it through Poland, Slovakia and Hungary. This gas costs us less than the Russian gas that we buy on the border with Russia, and RWE sells us the same gas that it buys from Russia". He also stated that Ukraine annually overpaid Russia $7 billion for natural gas.)

On 9 January 2014, Ukrainian prime minister Mykola Azarov stated "at full capacity the program of industrial cooperation with Russia that will give us in the coming years hundreds of thousands of jobs and guarantees for budgets of all levels, which will be a financial base for the development of our domestic market".

On 29 January, in response to the resignation of the second Azarov Government, and despite pledging to honor agreements with Ukraine, Russia restarted tight border controls and other restrictions at the border for Ukrainian goods. Russia imposed inspections on 100% of Ukrainian exports to Russia. A government source suggested the customs war with Ukraine was a measure to pressure Ukrainian oligarchs into maintaining a pro-Russian policy vector.

=== Political effects ===
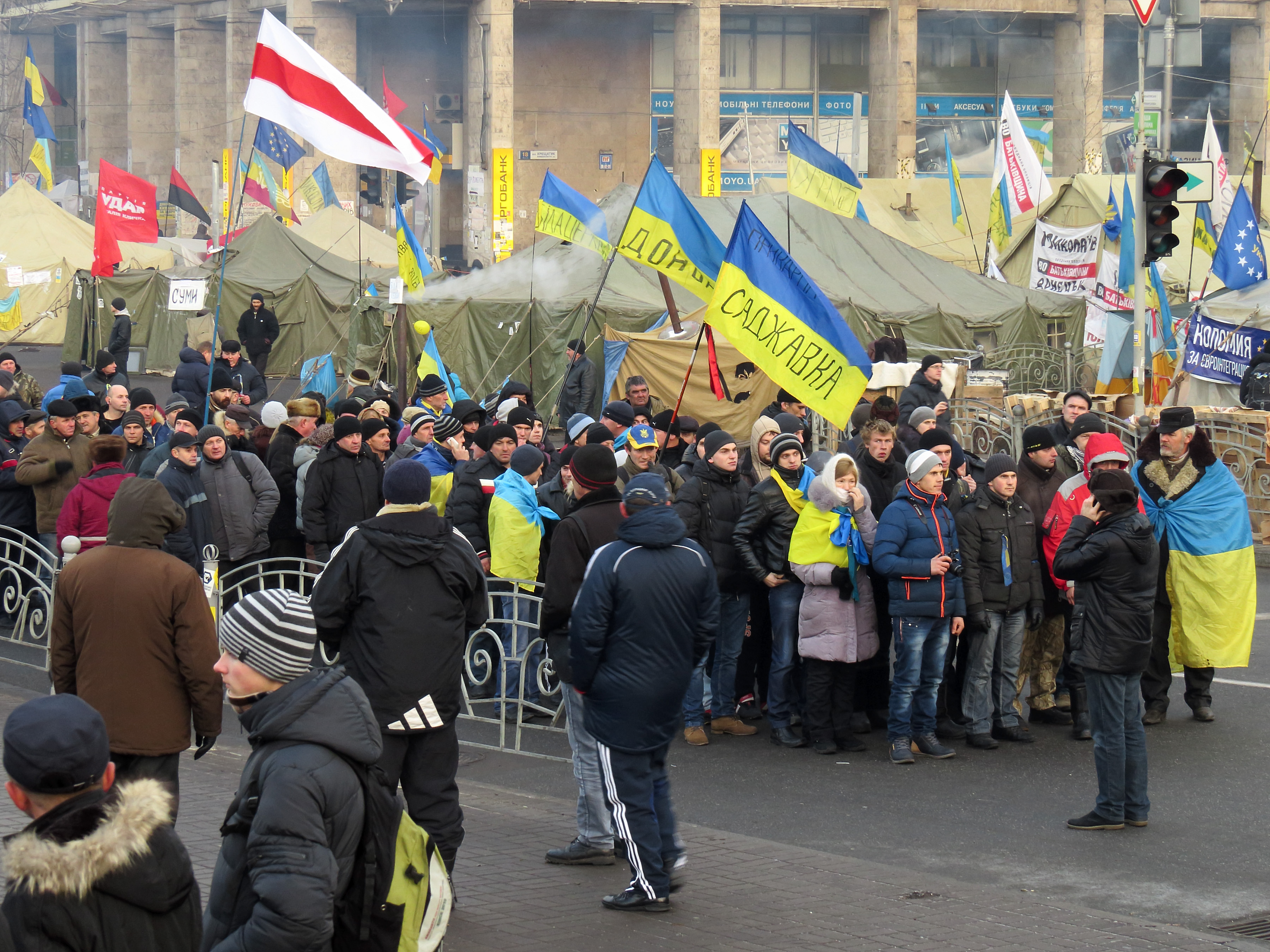
Euromaidan protesters gathered at Kyiv's Maidan Nezalezhnosti on 18 December 2013

The Euromaidan movement continued in spite of the 17 December 2013 agreement. Opposition leaders vowed to continue their protests, if necessary, through New Year and Orthodox Christmas (celebrated on 7 January annually). They repeated their demands for the firing of the second Azarov Government, early presidential and parliamentary elections.

On 20 December, high-ranking EU-officials stated that the EU is still ready to sign the Association Agreement with Ukraine "as soon as Ukraine is ready for it", that this agreement was also beneficial for Russia and that the EU "is totally not concerned about the fact that Ukraine is signing agreements with Russia". The day before Polish foreign minister Radosław Sikorski stated "I do not know any formal facts that should say that it is impossible to sign the association agreement between Ukraine and the European Union".

On 19 December, Ukrainian president Viktor Yanukovych stated that his government had decided to pause work on the Association Agreement in order to determine the conditions that should be in place for them to sign the Free Trade Zone Agreement, a part of the larger Association Agreement. He continued to say that there was not any contradiction inherent in Ukraine's course on the EU integration issue. Yanukovych asserted that the crux of the matter is not about integration, but about economic relations. Although he added "If we talk about the work on the free trade agreement [a part of the EU Association Agreement], this will take us some time, and we still have a lot of uncertainties. Surely, we should see how this will benefit us in the short term, midterm, and long term". He also added that Ukraine may combine the EU Association Agreement with observer status in the Customs Union of Belarus, Kazakhstan, and Russia and the Eurasian Economic Union. According to the Ukrainian president Viktor Yanukovych, Ukraine expects to be granted observer status in the Eurasian Economic Union. "As concerns the Eurasian Union, we filed a written bid in Astana in August this year to consider Ukraine's participation in the Eurasian Union as an observer".

On 29 January and just after the resignation of the second Azarov Government First deputy head of A Just Russia, Mikhail Emelyanov, stated the need to cancel the Ukrainian-Russian Action Plan and its discount in natural gas, and refuse the redemption of eurobonds 'if the government will resume Eurointegration'.

=== April 2014 end of discount price for Ukraine ===
Mid-June 2014 the price Ukraine paid to Russia for natural gas was $485.50 per 1,000 cubic metres, the highest in Europe.

After trilateral months of talks between the European Union, Ukraine and Russia, a deal was reached on 30 October 2014 in which Ukraine agreed to pay (in advance) $378 per 1,000 cubic metres to the end of 2014, and $365 in the first quarter (ending on 31 March) of 2015.

== Expert analysis ==
- Swedish economist Anders Åslund criticized the agreement, saying "Details will continue to emerge, perhaps pulling the bigger picture into focus, but right now it appears that this deal is heavily one-sided and greatly favors Russia."
- James Sherr, a fellow at the Russian and Eurasian program at London-based think tank Chatham House, and key Western expert on Ukraine and Russia described the deal: "the conditions that Yanukovych has accepted from Moscow perpetuate weakness and subservience. Nothing in the Moscow accords even addresses the causes of Ukraine's economic disaster."
  "While Ukraine has every right to alter its course, Russia has no right to force Ukraine to alter it. The December 1994 Budapest Memorandum obliges all parties to 'refrain from economic coercion.' Coercion does not show respect for sovereignty. It is a violation of sovereignty. A number of European leaders are as persuaded as I am that Russia employed economic coercion."
  "The Customs Union is yesterday's story. The new framework will be built on interlocking, inter-sectoral integration, in other words Russian co-ownership and co-management of key sectors of Ukraine's economy. In 2010, Medvedev presented Yanukovych with precisely such a model, embracing shipbuilding, chemicals, and of course, aerospace, the defense complex and energy, which every Ukrainian president has regarded as a mainstay of national independence. All of this was very public at the time. In 2010, Yanukovych rejected it. Now he has accepted it. There are still questions about details and bigger questions about how much can and will be implemented. But the Russians are very happy. Their conclusion is that 'Ukraine is now ours'. Azarov can still insist that Ukraine won't join the Customs Union. But that is now irrelevant. The story has moved on."
