= Azarov government =

Azarov government may refer to a government of Ukrainian prime minister Mykola Azarov:

- First Azarov government, 11 March 2010 to 3 December 2012
- Second Azarov government, 24 December 2012 to 28 January 2014
