= State Tax Service of Ukraine =

Government body (established 2019)

The State Tax Service of Ukraine
- Державна податкова служба України
- Logo of the State Tax Service

Revenue agency overview
- Preceding Revenue agency: State Fiscal Service of Ukraine
- Jurisdiction: Ukraine
- Headquarters: 04655, Kyiv, Lviv Square, building 8
- Parent department: Ministry of Finance (Ukraine)
- Website: https://tax.gov.ua/en/

The State Tax Service of Ukraine is the central executive body in the field of taxes in Ukraine, which was restored in 2019 by dividing the State Fiscal Service. The activities of the service are directed and coordinated by the Cabinet of Ministers of Ukraine through the Minister of Finance.

== Chair persons ==
- 2021 – present Tetyana Kiriyenko (Acting Head)

=== Previous executives ===
Chief of State Tax Inspection (Deputy Minister of Finance of Ukraine)

- 1990–1992 Vitaliy Ilyin
- 1992–1993 Viktor Tenyuk
- 1993–1996 Vitaliy Ilyin

Chair person of State Tax Administration

- 1996–2002 Mykola Azarov
- 2002–2004 Yuriy Kravchenko
- 2004–2005 Fedir Yaroshenko
- 2005–2006 Oleksandr Kireyev
- 2006–2007 Anatoliy Brezvin
- 2007–2010 Serhiy Buryak
- 2010–2010 Viktor Sheibut (acting)
- 2010–2010 Oleksandr Papayika

Chair person of State Tax Service

- 2010–2011 Vitaliy Zakharchenko
- 2011–2012 Oleksandr Klymenko
- 2012–2019 (part of the State Fiscal Service)
- 2019–2020 Serhii Verlanov
- 2020–2021 Oleksiy Liubchenko
- 2021 (May – November) Yevhen Oleynikov (acting head)
- 2021 (November – December) Mykhaylo Titarchuk (acting head)
