= Roman Nasirov =

Ukrainian politician (born 1979)

- Роман Насіров
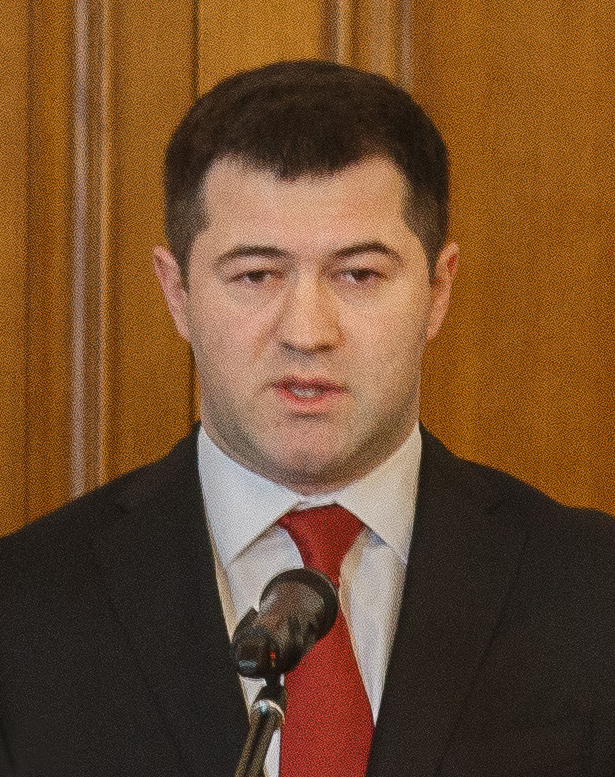

Chairman of State Fiscal Service of Ukraine
- In office 5 May 2015 – 31 January 2018
- Preceded by: Ihor Bilous
- Succeeded by: Myroslav Prodan (acting)

Personal details
- Born: 3 March 1979 (age 47) Chernihiv, Ukrainian SSR, Soviet Union (now Ukraine)
- Citizenship: Ukrainian, British
- Party: European Solidarity
- Education: Kyiv National Economic University; Chernihiv State Institute of Economics and Management

Roman Mykhailovych Nasirov (Ukrainian: Роман Михайлович Насіров; Born 3 March 1979) is a Ukrainian politician who served as the Head of the State Fiscal Service of Ukraine. He was temporarily relieved of his duties on 3 March 2017 and although he was reinstated in his function by a court decision late 2018 he did not return as head of the State Fiscal Service.

== Early life and career ==
Roman Nasirov was born in Chernihiv, on 3 March 1979. In 2000, Roman Nasirov graduated from the Chernihiv State Institute of Economics and Management, with a specialty in Finance. In December 2001 he graduated from the Kyiv National Economic University, with a specialty in Law. He received his PhD degree in Law in 2015 from The Legislation Institute of the Verkhovna Rada of Ukraine. He is currently (2016) a candidate for Doctor of Economics at Chernihiv National University of Technology.

== Work experience ==
From 2005 to 2006 he worked in executive search in London for Global Risk Solutions, under Richard Paisley. In December 2009, he was the CEO of Renaissance Capital Ukraine, Central & Eastern Europe. In March 2013, Roman Nasirov was the Deputy Chairman of the Board of the State Food and Grain Corporation of Ukraine. In April 2014 Roman Nasirov was CEO of BTGPactual (Ukraine) and in November 2014 he won a seat in the Verkhovna Rada (Ukrainian parliament) for Petro Poroshenko Bloc. In December 2014 Roman Nasirov was the head of the Committee of the Verkhovna Rada on Tax and Customs Policy. In May 2015 Roman Nasirov was appointed the Head of the State Fiscal Service of Ukraine. In July 2016 at the 20th General Assembly of the Intra-European Organisation of Tax Administrations (IOTA), which was held in Romania, Roman Nasirov was elected as the President of the Intra-European Organisation of Tax Administrations (IOTA).

== Parliamentary activities ==
On April 9, 2015, he voted in favor of recognizing the status of fighters for the independence of Ukraine in the 20th century of all nationalist formations, including those participating in the occupation of modern Ukrainian lands on the side of the German Empire and the Third Reich.

== Legal cases ==
Nasirov was taken to Kyiv's Feofania hospital late on 2 March 2017. Meanwhile he was being investigated for embezzlement (in conjunction with MP Oleksandr Onyshchenko) of ₴2 billion ($75 million) in tax revenue linked to a gas deal (punishable to six years in prison).

Ukraine's National Anti-Corruption Bureau (NABU) opened a case against Nasirov corruption with total of ₴2 billion. Following a three-month pre-trial investigation, the Special Anti-Corruption Prosecutor decided to indict Nasirov in November 2017.

On 8 March 2017 Nasirov released from jail by his wife after paying a bail of ₴100 million.

On 31 January 2018, the Cabinet of Ministers dismissed Nasirov as head of the State Fiscal Service. On 1 December 2018, the District Administrative Court of Kyiv reinstated him in this position and ordered the state to pay him compensation of ₴184,000. According to the press secretary of the State Fiscal Service Natalia Nepryakhina, Nasirov did appear at the office of the State Fiscal Service on 27 December 2018, but Oleksandr Vlasov remained the head of the organisation.

Nasirov filed documents to participate in the 2019 Ukrainian presidential election with the Central Election Commission on 16 January 2019. Nasirov came last (39th) in the vote, having garnered 2,579 votes (0.01%).

In October 2022 NABU and the Specialized Anti-Corruption Prosecutor's Office (SAPO) accused Nasirov and Oleg Bakhmatyuk of receiving $5.5 million and more than €21 million euros of illegal benefits for VAT reimbursement to agricultural holding companies. He was taken into custody with a bail of ₴523 million. He was not able to pay this bail until 24 May 2024 he was able to finance the reduced bail of ₴55 and on that day left custody but was put on house arrest with an electronic bracelet.

== Publications ==
- Roman Nasirov: The 'single window' in Ukrainian realities
- Roman Nasirov: Chronicles of customs reforms in Ukraine
- Roman Nasirov: State Fiscal Service collects additional $6 billion in tax revenues for Ukrainians
- Roman Nasirov: Electronic services is a top priority for State Fiscal Service of Ukraine
- Roman Nasirov: Heads of European tax offices will get together in Ukraine for ‘Tax Eurovision
- The Opening Of The Regional Dog Training Centre Of The World Customs Organization In Khmelnytskyi
- Implementation of the Budget 2017 will be Difficult, but I Look to the Future with Confidence
- Roman Nasirov: International activity of the SFS – results of the year
