= Second Azarov government =

Government of Ukraine

Second Azarov Government
- 16th Cabinet of Ukraine (since 1990)

- Date formed: 24 December 2012
- Date dissolved: 28 January 2014 (de facto); 28 February 2014 (de jure)

People and organisations
- Head of state: Viktor Yanukovych; Oleksandr Turchynov (acting)
- Head of government: Mykola Azarov; Serhiy Arbuzov (acting); Oleksandr Turchynov (acting)
- Deputy head of government: Serhiy Arbuzov
- No. of ministers: 23
- Member party: Party of Regions; Ukraine – Forward!
- Status in legislature: Majority
- Opposition party: Batkivshchyna; UDAR; Svoboda
- Opposition leader: Arseniy Yatsenyuk; Vitaliy Klychko; Oleh Tyahnybok

History
- Predecessor: First Azarov government
- Successor: First Yatsenyuk government

The second Azarov government (Ukrainian: Другий уряд Миколи Азарова, Druhyi uriad Mykoly Azarova) was the government of Ukraine from 24 December 2012 to 28 January 2014. It was dissolved amidst the Euromaidan protests. The ministers (except Prime Minister Mykola Azarov who was replaced by Deputy Prime Minister Serhiy Arbuzov (ex officio)) continued briefly as a caretaker government. On 27 February 2014 Ukraine's parliament approved a resolution to formally dismiss the government.

== Creation ==
On 3 December 2012, the first Azarov government became a caretaker government after Ukrainian president Viktor Yanukovich accepted the resignation of prime minister Mykola Azarov and his government following the 28 October 2012 parliamentary election. A number of government members, including Prime Minister Azarov, were elected to parliament in that election. In order to get these parliamentary mandates, they were obliged to submit documents on the dismissal from their previous job to the Central Election Commission within 20 days after the election (by 3 December).

On 9 December 2012, Yanukovych nominated Azarov for a new term as prime minister. This nomination was approved by parliament on 13 December 2012. According to Svoboda, that voted absolutely against Azarov, his appointment is illegal at least due to such technicality in the law of Ukraine which requires the president of Ukraine to be physically present in the session hall of parliament during his candidacy approval by the Verkhovna Rada. The People's Deputy of Ukraine from the parliamentary faction UDAR, Iryna Herashchenko, stated that all political appointments that took place that day are a "political bribe" of the party of power (Party of Regions) to the Communist Party of Ukraine. On 4 December 2012, nine days before the appointment of Azarov, a people's deputy of Ukraine from the Communist Party of Ukraine Spiridon Kilinkarov insisted on the political talk show Syohodni. Pro holovne on the Ukrainian television channel TVi that the communists absolutely will not vote for any candidates for the prime minister of Ukraine from the Party of Regions. On 13 December, absolutely all members of the Communist Party of Ukraine voted as one for the candidacy of Mykola Azarov as the Prime Minister of Ukraine.

On 24 December 2012, the second Azarov government was appointed by president Yanukovych (Presidential Ukase #726/2012). The coalition of Party of Regions and Ukraine – Forward! as it is now in the government was foreseen and mentioned by the Ukrainian television studio Kvartal 95 in October 2012 in one of their episodes of Evening quarter.

According to Anders Åslund, the government faced three big tasks: to govern, to break Ukraine's foreign isolation and to salvage the country from a vulnerable financial situation. In December 2012, he observed "little reason to believe that it can solve any of these three tasks".

Communist Party faction leader Petro Symonenko stated on 28 December 2012 that the Communist Party of Ukraine and the Party of Regions had not concluded any agreements concerning the Communist support of Mykola Azarov's candidacy for the post of Prime Minister but that his party had supported this nomination because Azarov had told them his government was ready to implement the program on Ukraine's accession to the Customs Union of Belarus, Kazakhstan and Russia. Symonenko added that should Azarov fail to fulfill the promise of Ukraine's joining this customs union, the Communists would initiate his resignation.

=== Parliamentary voting ===
Yes	No	Abstained	Did not vote	Total
252	129	0	20	401

Faction	Number of members	Yes	No	Abstained	Did not vote	Absent
Party of Regions	210	208	0	0	0	2
Batkivshchyna – United Opposition	99	0	51	0	16	32
UDAR	42	0	38	0	3	1
Svoboda	37	0	37	0	0	0
Communist Party of Ukraine	32	32	0	0	0	0
Not affiliated	24	12	3	0	1	8

=== Vote of no confidence ===
In 2013 the government managed twice to survive the vote of no confidence from the Ukrainian parliament until finally the president of Ukraine accepted the resignation of prime minister of Ukraine Mykola Azarov earlier in 2014.

The first time the parliament voted on 19 April 2013.

Yes	No	Abstained	Did not vote	Total
190	91	2	79	362

Faction	Number of members	Yes	No	Abstained	Did not vote	Absent
Party of Regions	207	0	91	2	74	40
Batkivshchyna – United Opposition	95	88	0	0	0	7
UDAR	42	35	0	0	0	7
Svoboda	36	36	0	0	0	0
Communist Party of Ukraine	32	21	0	0	1	10
Not affiliated	32	10	0	0	4	18

The second time the parliament voted on 3 December 2013.

Yes	No	Abstained	Did not vote	Total
186	5	12	135	338

Faction	Number of members	Yes	No	Abstained	Did not vote	Absent
Party of Regions	205	1	5	12	100	87
Batkivshchyna – United Opposition	90	90	0	0	0	0
UDAR	42	42	0	0	0	0
Svoboda	36	36	0	0	0	0
Communist Party of Ukraine	31	0	0	0	31	0
Not affiliated	38	17	0	0	4	17

== Fall ==
After weeks of Euromaidan protests, and clashes, during which civilians were killed, Prime Minister Azarov offered his letter of resignation on 28 January 2014. According to his cabinet, Azarov was quoted saying that "In order to create additional opportunities for socio-political compromise, for the sake of the peaceful settlement of the conflict, I have made a personal decision to ask the Ukrainian president to accept my resignation from the post of Ukrainian prime minister". Under the Ukrainian constitution this meant the whole government had resigned. The president subsequently accepted the resignation and signed a decree dismissing the cabinet, which decree would not take effect until the Verhovna Rada approved a new cabinet. Hence the second Azarov government continued as a caretaker government. Prime Minister Azarov was replaced by deputy prime minister Serhiy Arbuzov. But under Ukrainian law the cabinet could be able to implement its duties for no more than 60 days.

The compromise deal of 21 February 2014 between president Yanukovych and the opposition stipulated that a new national unity government was to be formed within ten days. Also on 21 February 2014 parliament dismissed the Minister of Internal Affairs Vitaliy Zakharchenko.

On 22 February 2014 the Ukrainian parliament appointed Oleksandr Turchynov as a coordinator of the Cabinet of Ukraine (Serhiy Arbuzov was not dismissed from his position). The same day the Verkhovna Rada adopted number of laws which appointed parliamentary commissioners in control of several state agencies such as Ministry of Defense (Volodymyr Zamana), Security Service of Ukraine (Valentyn Nalyvaichenko) and Prosecutor General's office (Oleh Makhnitsky). Parliament also appointed Arsen Avakov as the acting Minister of International Affairs. Also on 22 February 2014 parliament expressed no confidence to the Prosecutor General of Ukraine Viktor Pshonka following his dismissal from the post.

On 23 February 2014 the Verkhovna Rada dismissed the Minister of Healthcare Raisa Bohatyriova. It also dismissed the Minister of Education and Science Dmytro Tabachnyk On 24 February 2014 (revoted on 24 February) Minister of Foreign Affairs Leonid Kozhara was dismissed by parliament and parliament a decision to dismiss the Minister of Social Policy Natalia Korolevska and the Minister of Culture Leonid Novokhatko.

On 27 February 2014 Ukraine's parliament approved a resolution to dismiss the government. They immediately followed it by the appointment of the new cabinet members of the Yatsenyuk government.

== Achievements ==
In December 2013 the IMF stated that the Ukrainian government's policy mix had "generated large external and fiscal imbalances" and that this had "contributed to deepening the recession in the country".

== Composition ==
When the cabinet took oath 24 December 2012; till 5 February 2013 the posts of Minister of Culture and Minister of Industrial policy were vacant. On 28 February 2013 President Viktor Yanukovych reorganized the Ministry of Education and Science, Youth and Sports and the State Service for Youth and Sports, creating a Ministry of Education and the (new) Ministry of Youth and Sports. On 2 July 2013 Oleksandr Lavrynovych was elected as member of the Supreme Council of Justice of Ukraine. Olena Lukash replaced Lavrynovych as Justice Minister 2 days later.

After on 28 January 2014 Prime Minister Mykola Azarov was replaced by Deputy Prime Minister Serhiy Arbuzov all ministers in the cabinet kept their post and continued as a caretaker government.

=== Composition ===
Party key	Party of Regions
Party key	Ukraine – Forward!
Party key	Non-party politician

Office	Party	Incumbent
Prime Minister		Mykola Azarov (until 28 Jan 2014)
First Vice Prime Minister		Serhiy Arbuzov
Vice Prime Minister (Ecology, natural resources, energy, coal industry and industrial policy, space sector)		Yuriy Boyko
Vice Prime Minister (Infrastructure, regional development, construction, utilities and housing economy)		Oleksandr Vilkul
Vice Prime Minister (Culture, healthcare, education, sciences, youth and sports)		Kostyantyn Gryshchenko
Minister of Social Policy		Natalia Korolevska (until 24 Feb 2014)
Minister of Revenues and Duties		Oleksandr Klymenko
Minister of Health		Raisa Bogatyrova (until 23 Feb 2014)
Minister of Economical Development and Trade		Ihor Prasolov
Minister of Regional Development, Construction and Communal Living		Hennadiy Temnyk
Minister of Education and Science		Dmytro Tabachnyk (until 23 Feb 2014)
Minister of Culture		Leonid Novokhatko (until 24 Feb 2014)
Minister of Industrial policy		Mikhaylo Korolenko
Minister of Defense		Pavlo Lebedyev
Minister of Internal Affairs		Vitaliy Zakharchenko (until 21 Feb 2014)
Minister of Agrarian Policy and Food		Mykola Prysyazhnyuk
Minister of Justice		Oleksandr Lavrynovych (until 2 July 2013); Olena Lukash (since 4 July 2013)
Minister of Foreign Affairs		Leonid Kozhara (until 23 Feb 2014)
Minister of Finance		Yuriy Kolobov
Minister of Energy [Generation] and Coal [Mining] Industry		Eduard Stavitskyi
Minister of Ecology and Natural Resources of Ukraine		Oleh Proskuryakov
Minister of Infrastructure of Ukraine		Volodymyr Kozak
Ministry of Youth and Sports		Ravil Safiullin

=== Vice prime minister assignments ===
- First Vice PM – Serhiy Arbuzov
  - Ministry of Agrarian Policy and Food
  - Ministry of Economical Development and Trade
  - Ministry of Social Policy
  - Ministry of Finance
  - Ministry of Revenues and Duties
- Vice PM – Yuri Boiko
  - Ministry of Energy and Coal Industry
  - Ministry of Ecology and Natural Resources
  - Ministry of Industrial Policy
  - Space sector
- Vice PM – Oleksandr Vilkul
  - Ministry of Infrastructure
  - Ministry of Regional Development, Construction and Housing
- Vice PM – Kostyantyn Hryshchenko
  - Ministry of Culture
  - Ministry of Education and Science, Youth and Sport
  - Ministry of Health Security
- Non-supervised ministries (National Security and Defense Council of Ukraine)
  - Ministry of Justice
  - Ministry of Defense
  - Ministry of Foreign Affairs
  - Ministry of Internal Affairs
  - Ministry of Cabinet of Ministers
