= State Customs Service of Ukraine =

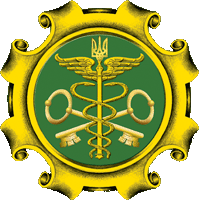

Agency overview
- Formed: July 18, 2019; 6 years ago
- Preceding agency: State Fiscal Service of Ukraine
- Agency executive: Orest Mandziy
- Website: customs.gov.ua

State Customs Service of Ukraine (Ukrainian: Державна митна служба України is a government agency in Ukraine established in 2019 that implements the state customs policy and the state policy in the field of combating offences in the application of legislation on state customs affairs. The activities of the Service are directed and coordinated by the Cabinet of Ministers of Ukraine through the Minister of Finance.

The Regulation on the State Customs Service of Ukraine was approved on March 6, 2019, and the legal entity was registered on July 18, 2019.

The entity was created by dividing the State Fiscal Service of Ukraine.

== Chairpersons ==
Head of State Custom Committee

- 1991 - 1993 Oleksiy Koval
- 1993 - 1994 Anatoliy Kolos
- 1994 - 1994 Eduard Miroshnichenko (acting)
- 1994 - 1995 Yuriy Kravchenko
- 1995 - 1996 Leonid Derkach

Head of State Customs Service

- 1996 - 1998 Leonid Derkach
- 1998 - 2001 Yuriy Solovkov
- 2001 - 2005 Mykola Kalensky
- 2005 - 2005 Volodymyr Skomarovsky
- 2005 - 2007 Oleksandr Yehorov
- 2007 - 2009 Valeriy Khoroshkovsky
- 2009 - 2010 Anatoliy Makarenko
- 2010 - 2012 Ihor Kalietnik
- 2012 - 2014 Superseded by Ministry of Revenues and Duties
- 2014 - 2019 Superseded by State Fiscal Service

Head of State Customs Service

- 2019 - 2020 Maksym Nefyodov
- 2020 - 2021 Pavlo Riabikin
- since 2026 Orest Mandziy
