= Ministry of Revenues and Duties of Ukraine =

Former Ukrainian government agency

Ministry of Revenues and Duties Міністерство доходів і зборів (2012-2014, dissolved)
- Coat of arms of Ukraine

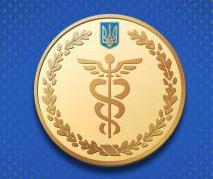

Agency overview
- Formed: 24 December 2012
- Preceding agency: State Tax Service and the State Customs Service
- Dissolved: 27 May 2014
- Superseding agency: State Fiscal Service
- Jurisdiction: Ukraine
- Headquarters: Kyiv
- Parent agency: Cabinet of Ministers

The Ministry of Revenues and Duties (Ukrainian: Міністерство доходів і зборів України, romanized: Ministerstvo dokhodiv i zboriv Ukrainy) was a government ministry of Ukraine.

The ministry was created on 24 December 2012 by a Decree of Ukrainian President Viktor Yanukovych and it merged the country's State Tax Service and the State Customs Service. Its first and only minister was Oleksandr Klymenko. On 1 March 2014 the ministry was liquidated. Its agencies were transferred to the Ministry of Finance.

On May 27, 2014 it was announced that the ministry will be reorganized into the State Fiscal Service and will be subordinated to the Ministry of Finances.

== Corruption case ==
The building of this ministry contained a large jacuzzi; angelic fresco on the ceiling; a deluxe sauna and a "salt room" (with the floor and ceiling covered in salt); allegedly bare-knuckle boxing matches were held in a specially designed room for it in the building.

Since 31 May 2014 Klymenko is wanted by the General Prosecutor of Ukraine for the creation of tax evasion procedures to significantly reducing the customs value of certain companies. An alleged example of this is the setting up of non-existing firms to whittle tax obligations. This and other alleged crimes are to have costed the state budget of Ukraine ₴6 billion. Klymenko has denied all allegations against him and has called them "groundless".
