= Yuriy Kolobov =

Ukrainian politician (born 1973)

- Юрій Колобов
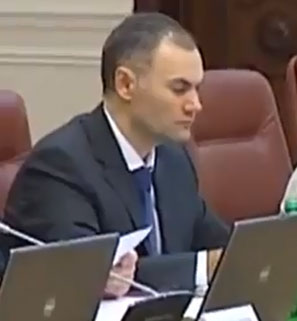
- Kolobov in 2013

Minister of Finance of Ukraine
- In office 28 February 2012 – 27 February 2014
- Prime Minister: Mykola Azarov
- Preceded by: Valeriy Khoroshkovskyi
- Succeeded by: Oleksandr Shlapak

Personal details
- Born: 8 April 1973 (age 53) Pavlohrad, Dnipropetrovsk Oblast, Ukraine
- Spouse: Married
- Children: A daughter and a son

Yuriy Kolobov (Ukrainian: Юрій Володимирович Колобов; born 8 April 1973) is a former Minister of Finance of Ukraine.

== Biography ==
Kolobov graduated from Dnipro State Academy of Civil Engineering and Architecture and the University of Kharkiv.

He has worked as a director of treasury for the State Savings Bank of Ukraine (OshchadBank) until June 2008. From June to December 2008 Kolobov was chairman of the board for the BTA Bank. He also worked as a counselor on banking issues for the Finance Company Kibrit. In 2010 Kolobov was a leading executive for the State Export-Import Bank of Ukraine (UkrExImBank).

From 29 December 2010 he was appointed the first deputy of the chairman of the National Bank of Ukraine.

On 28 February 2012 (by decree of President Viktor Yanukovych) he was appointed Minister of Finance.

On 25 September 2014 the Ukraine General Prosecutor opened a criminal probe into Kolobov; he is accused of illegally transferring a $450,000 fee to Russia's state-run VTB Capital as a kickback for the 17 December 2013 Russian–Ukrainian action plan. Five days later a criminal probe into Kolobov was opened for embezzling Ukrtelekom.

Since 3 July 2014 Kolobov is in the international wanted list for abuse of power.

Russian prosecutors refused to extradite Kolobov to Ukraine and stated (according to Ukraine falsely) that they have not received such a request from Ukraine.

According to the interior ministry of Ukraine, Kolobov was arrested on 4. March 2015 in a flat located in the luxury development "Altea Hills" near the Spanish town of Valencia. After hearings the Spanish court concluded that Kolobov was innocent and the case was politically motivated . The Spanish police announced that the Kolobov case is politically motivated

== Hobby ==
Kolobov likes playing basketball. He was promoting Ukraine to host EuroBasket 2015 when he was a Minister of Finance. In May 2016 Kolobov was appointed a chairman of the Tutorial Council of the Ukrainian Basketball Federation. In May 2016, the ex-minister incurred expenses for Ukraine national under-15 basketball team who participated in championship hosted by Spain. Furthermore, Kolobov was called up for Ukraine veterans basketball team.
