= Serhii Verlanov =

Ukrainian politician

- Сергій Верланов
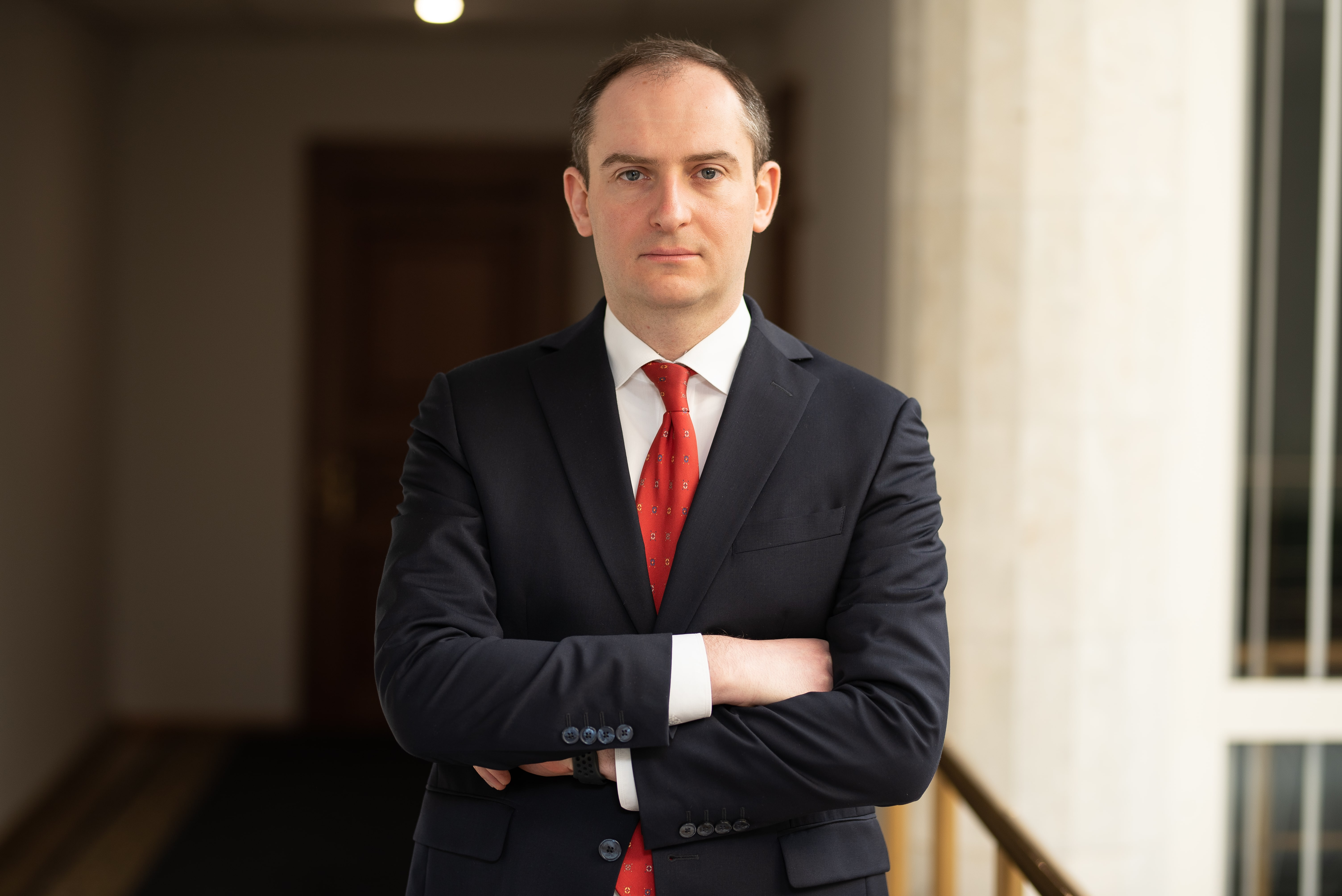

Head of the State Tax Service of Ukraine
- In office 8 May 2019 – 24 April 2020
- Prime Minister: Oleksiy Honcharuk

Personal details
- Born: 6 August 1981 (age 45) Lviv, USSR (now Ukraine)
- Education: University of Lviv

Serhii Oleksiiovych Verlanov (Ukrainian: Сергій Олексійович Верланов; born 6 August 1981 in Lviv, Ukrainian SSR, USSR) is a Ukrainian state official, attorney who is a former Head of the State Tax Service of Ukraine. From July 2018 to May 2019, Verlanov served as the Deputy Minister of Finance of Ukraine.

== Biography ==
In 1998 – 2003, Verlanov studied law at the Ivan Franko National University of Lviv, Ukraine, graduating with ML. In 2008, he obtained his Doctor of Juridical Science degree (Ukrainian nomenclature for the degree is кандидат юридичних наук). From November 2008 to June 2015 Verlanov worked as an attorney in PricewaterhouseCoopers. From July 2015 to July 2018 he was a partner at “Sayenko Kharenko”, one of the leading law firms in Ukraine.

In 2015 – 2017 Verlanov was the co-chair of the Legal Policy Committee of American Chamber of Commerce in Ukraine. In 2016 – 2018 he was the member of The Public Integrity Council (PIC) of Ukraine and the High Qualifications Commission of Judges of Ukraine (HQC).

On July 26, 2018 Verlanov was appointed Deputy Minister of Finance of Ukraine responsible for customs and taxation. On May 8, 2019, Serhii Verlanov was appointed as the Head of the State Tax Service by The Cabinet of Ministers of Ukraine. On July 31, 2019, he became the member of the National Anticorruption Policy Council of Ukraine. Serhii Verlanov is the current member of Advisory Board of Ukrainian Catholic University Law School.

Verlanov headed the State Tax Service of Ukraine from May 2019 until he was dismissed on 24 April 2020.

== Personal life ==
Married to Kateryna Viktorivna Horytska. The couple has daughter Anna.
