= Volodymyr Skomarovsky =

Ukrainian politician (born 1958)

- Володимир Скомаровський
- Skomarovsky in 2002.

Head of the State Customs Service of Ukraine
- In office 4 March 2005 – 8 September 2005
- President: Viktor Yushchenko
- Prime Minister: Yulia Tymoshenko
- Preceded by: Mykola Kalensky
- Succeeded by: Oleksandr Yehorov

People's Deputy of Ukraine
- In office 14 May 2002 – 17 March 2005 (Note: He voluntarily resigned in order to become Head of the State Customs Service of Ukraine, a state office. Ukrainian law did not permit dual mandates at that time.)
- Constituency: Our Ukraine Bloc, No. 49

Personal details
- Born: 25 June 1958 Samhorodok (Koziatyn Raion), Ukrainian SSR, Soviet Union
- Education: Our Ukraine Bloc (2002-2006); Andriy Baloha's Team (2010)

Volodymyr Volodymyrovych Skomarovsky (Ukrainian: Володимир Володимирович Скомаровський; born 25 June 1958) is a Ukrainian politician who served as Head of the State Customs Service of Ukraine in 2005. Prior to this, he was a People's Deputy of Ukraine in the Verkhovna Rada from 2002 to 2005.

== Early life ==
Skomarovsky was born on 25 June 1958 in the village of Samhorodok, which was then part of the Ukrainian SSR of the Soviet Union. After graduating from secondary school, he immediately entered the workforce, becoming an apprentice mechanic at the Vinnytsia Radio Equipment Plant in 1976. After a year, he left to do his mandatory two years in the Soviet Armed Forces, which he completed in 1979. Afterwards, he returned to the plant as an adjustment technician, a position he held until 1981. Skomarovsky then switched companies to start working as a radio technician at the "Elektronservis" enterprise, which was under the Vinnystia Production Association for the Repair of Consumer Radio Equipment at the time. While working there, he graduated in 1985 from the Vinnytsia National Technical University (then the Vinnytsia Polytechnic Institute]] with a specialisation as a radio engineer. He later earned a Candidate of Sciences title with a dissertation on entrepreneurship at the Moscow Institute of Economics and Construction. After this, he steadily worked his way up at Elektronservis from engineer to shop foreman, and finally, by 1995, to director. In 1993, he also founded and became CEO of the "Volodymyr" enterprise. A newspaper from 1998 recalled Skomarovsky as the "automobile king".

== Political career ==
=== 2002-2005: Verkhovna Rada ===
After unsuccessfully contesting in the 12th district during the 1998 Ukrainian parliamentary elections, only narrowly losing by 58 votes to future Ukrainian president Petro Poroshenko, he was put on the Our Ukraine Bloc party list for the 2002 Ukrainian parliamentary elections. He was placed 49th on the party list, and was thus successfully elected. Upon joining the Rada, he became a member of the Our Ukraine party in May 2002 and, starting in June 2002, was elected Chairman of the Subcommittee on Foreign Economic Activities and Customs Legislation within the Committee on Economic Policy. On 17 March 2005, he voluntarily renounced his mandate, prior to his term ending in 2006.

=== 2005: Head of the State Customs Service ===
On 4 March 2005, Viktor Yushchenko appointed Skomarovsky as Head of the State Customs Service of Ukraine. After he took office, he started reorganising the leadership, dismissing 21 heads of the 50 customs offices, and said that all customs heads would be replaced by the end of the month. Skomarovsky also removed all local customs offices from the subordination of regional customs directorates, instead placing them all under the central State Customs Service. He also said he would ask Yulia Tymoshenko, the then Prime Minister, to lower the import duty on vehicles, saying that Ukrainians had stopped importing foreign cars and that the market was paralysed, and also asked her to adopt legislation regarding the import of CDs and DVDs.

The dismissal of the 50 heads would eventually be delayed until July, when, during a collegium meeting with Yushchenko, Skomarovsky strongly "recommended" it again and for them to submit resignations requesting their transfer to the rank of first deputy heads. He also dismissed his deputy, Mykola Salahor, accusing him of corruption, saying Salahor was forcing regional customs heads to pay him regular "tributes" from revenues, and that he intimidated them if they did not by dropping high-profile political allies. In turn, Salahor alleged that Skomarovsky was a smuggler since the times he founded the enterprise "Volodymyr", and said that he had omitted from official biographies that he had been imprisoned for smuggling and released in 1999. At the time, Skomarovsky was still considered a close ally of both Yushchenko and Poroshenko. Tymoshenko, the Prime Minister, was in a power struggle with Poroshenko at the time, and appointed her own loyalists to deputy positions (since the president was the only one who could appoint heads of state agencies) in the agency, including Salahor, and ran the "Contraband - Stop" campaign. On 8 September 2005, after only a few months in the post, he was dismissed. The day prior, on 7 September, the then Head of the Security Service of Ukraine (SBU), Oleksandr Turchynov, had written a letter to Yushchenko asking for Skomarovsky to be dismissed, and the SBU announced the next day a criminal case against him on charges of corruption and smuggling.

=== Post-2005 ===
During the subsequent 2006 Ukrainian parliamentary elections, Skomarovsky again ran on the party list of the Our Ukraine Bloc, but this time was placed much lower at No. 126, and was thus not elected. In 2010, he ran for a seat in the Vinnytsia Oblast Council with Andriy Baloha's Team, a successor of Our Ukraine. As of 2015, he is still involved in business activities, owning OJSC "Keramik" and "Vlodymyrsky Massiv" in Vinnytsia. He has said that the authorities still continue trying to persecute him as part of raiding, which he attributes to Mykola Dubovyi, the head of the State Service for Combating Economic Crime in Vinnytsia Oblast.

== Personal life ==
=== Legal issues ===
On 8 September 2005, a criminal case was opened against him by the SBU on charges of corruption and smuggling. Like Salahor's claims, the case stemmed back to 1999, when Skomarovsky was leading "Volodymyr" and was accused of large-scale car smuggling, with the initial case being closed in October 1999 by SBU investigator Vasyl Vovk, who became deputy head of the State Customs Service of Ukraine upon Skomarovsky became its head. During investigations into the case by the SBU, on 30 August 2005, a few days prior to the case being opened, the Prosecutor General's Office of Ukraine officially annulled the 1999 closure and passed it onto the main investigation department of the SBU. In response, Skomarovsky said Turchynov's accusations were emotional and unsupported, and he said he would countersue. He claimed that the 1999 case had been reviewed five times in recent years, and that it had been political, instigated by him being popular in the Vinnytsia region and for having been an opponent of Poroshenko at the time. He said he had previously banned his firm from taking on foreign trade while he was in office, and claimed he was a "package dismissal" that the SBU had decided on. On 8 December 2005, the Vinnytsia Court of Appeal acquitted Skomarovsky and said that the SBU must close the case against him and destroy all materials.
