= Lviv Square =

Coordinates: 50.4548°N 30.5063°E

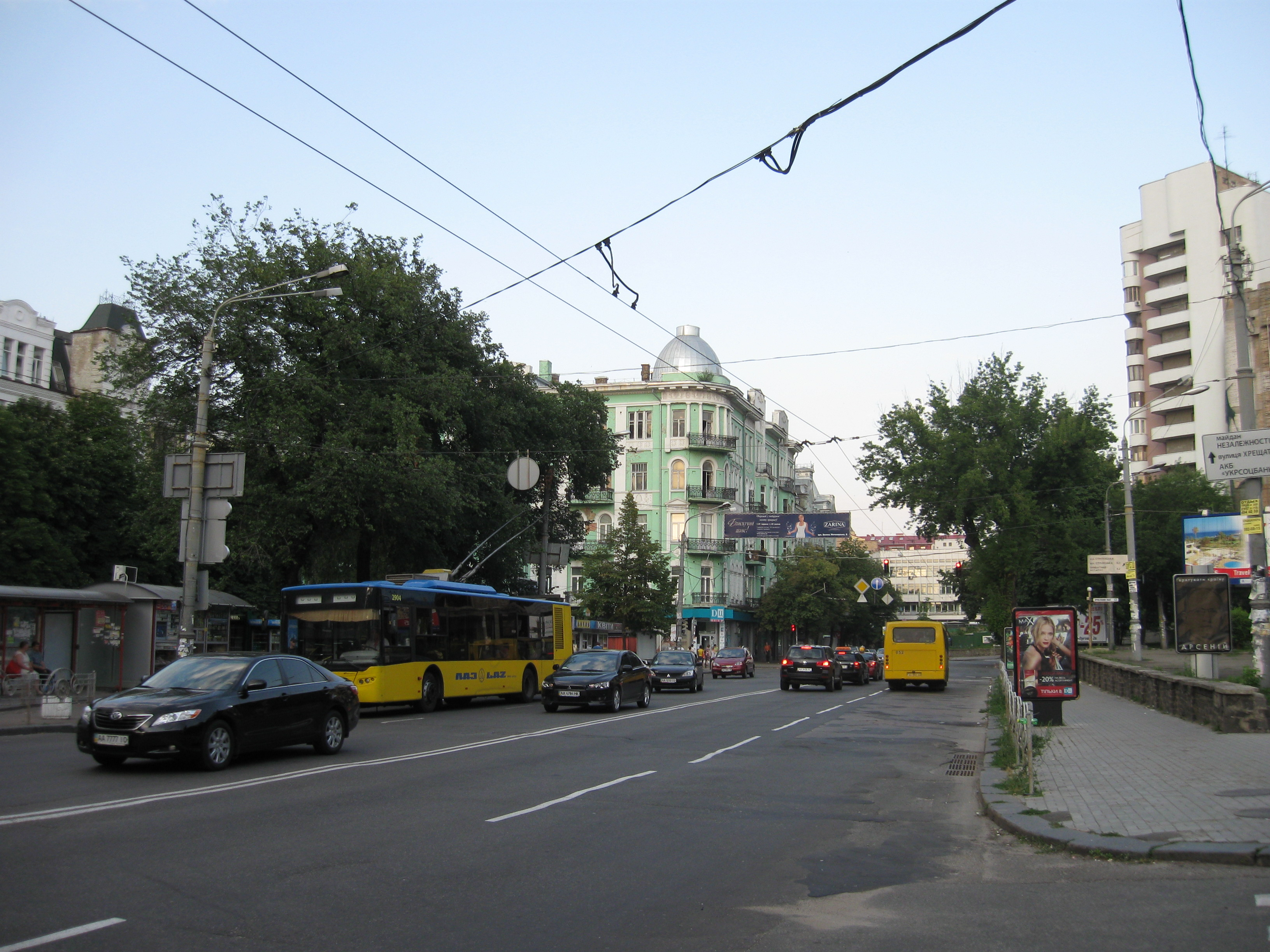
The square in 2009.

Lviv Square (Ukrainian: Львівська польща) also known as Lvivska Square one of the central areas of Kyiv, is located in the historical district of Kudryavets. The square is located at the junction of the street of Artem and Bolshoy Zhitomir, as well as Yaroslav Val. Previously, in the 1040s, on the site of the square there was the Western Gate in the stone fence of Kyiv.

== History ==
Since 1037, the Lviv Gate (originally the Jewish Gate) stood here, opening the route from Kyiv to Lviv. At that time, this area was a complex jumble of fortifications, the Western and Jewish Gates. However, neither the Western nor the Jewish Square were called that. In 1869, the square was renamed Lvovskaya (Lviv Square), after the Lviv Gate of the Old Kyiv Fortress, which stood there in the 17th and 18th centuries. In 1835, the gate was renamed Zhitomir Gate. In the mid-19th century, the gate was demolished, creating a square. Concurrent with its official name, the square also had another name: Sennaya because the Sennoy Bazaar (Sennaya Market) was located here (until 1958). It has had its current name since 1959.

== Development ==
The square's modern architectural ensemble is marked by two dominant buildings built during the Soviet era: the massive House of Commerce and the House of Artists, located opposite each other. The Trade House was built from 1968 to 1981. The Artists' House, which forms the western side of the square, was built in 1978. The façade of its second floor is decorated with seven female figures—allegories of the arts. The Church of the Presentation of the Lord was located on Lviv Square. It was wooden ( 11th century – mid- 19th century), and stone (built according to the design of the architect Vladimir Nikolaev in 1861, destroyed in the 1930s). There are plans to restore the church.
