= Oleksandr Klymenko (politician) =

Ukrainian politician

- Олександр Клименко; Александр Клименкo
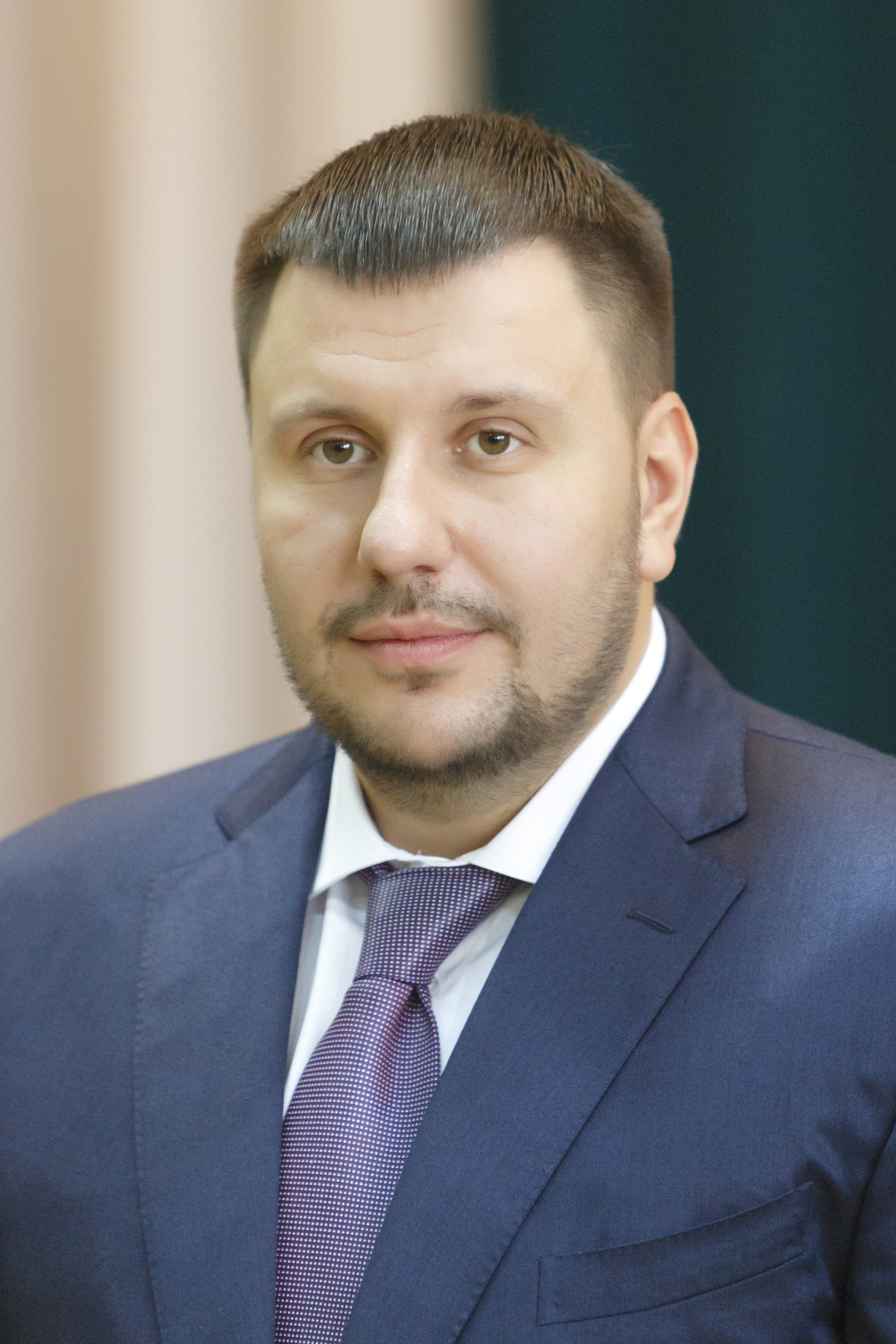
- Klymenko in 2013

Minister of Revenue and Duties of Ukraine
- In office December 24, 2012 – February 27, 2014
- President: Viktor Yanukovych
- Prime Minister: Mykola Azarov; Serhiy Arbuzov (acting)
- Preceded by: Office established
- Succeeded by: Office abolished

Head of the State Tax Service of Ukraine
- In office November 7, 2011 – December 24, 2012
- President: Viktor Yanukovych
- Prime Minister: Mykola Azarov
- Preceded by: Vitaliy Zakharchenko
- Succeeded by: Position Abolished

Head of the State Tax Administration in Donetsk oblast
- In office September 24, 2010 – February 18, 2011
- President: Viktor Yanukovych
- Prime Minister: Mykola Azarov
- Preceded by: Oleg Anatoliyovych Sokolov
- Succeeded by: Igor Oleksandrovych Usyk

Personal details
- Born: November 16, 1980 (age 45) Makiivka, Ukrainian Soviet Socialist Republic (now Ukraine)
- Education: Donetsk State University of Management; Dnipropetrovsk Regional Institute of Public Administration at the National Academy for Public Administration under the President of Ukraine
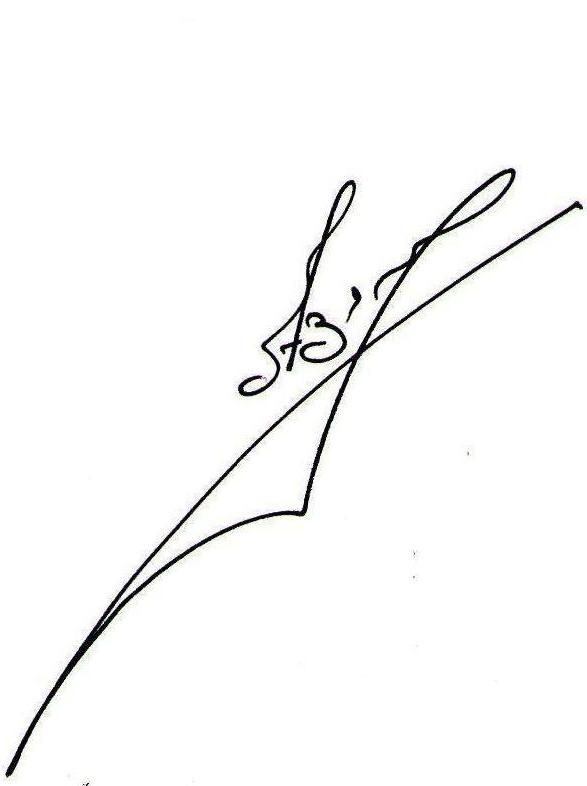
- Signature
- Website: http://oleksandr-klymenko.com/en/

Oleksandr Viktorovych Klymenko (Ukrainian: Олександр Вікторович Клименко, Russian: Александр Викторович Клименко, born November 16, 1980) is a former Ukrainian entrepreneur and politician, having served as former Minister of Revenue and Duties of Ukraine (December 24, 2012 – February 27, 2014) under president Viktor Yanukovych. Following the Revolution of Dignity in February 2014, Klymenko fled to Russia. He has been on the EU sanction list since April 2014, and his assets have been frozen. Oleksandr Klymenko is wanted by the General Prosecutor of Ukraine for corruption and currently lives in Moscow. In November 2017 Klymenko was charged with high treason claiming he had "deliberately harmed the economic and information security of Ukraine, sovereignty, territorial integrity and inviolability of our state during his tenure."

== Biography ==
=== Early life, education and business ===
Oleksandr Klymenko was born on November 16, 1980, in Makiivka, Donetsk oblast (Ukraine).

He graduated from the Donetsk State University of Management, with a master's degree in Finance (Master of Finance).

In February 2010, Klymenko graduated from Dnipropetrovsk Regional Institute of Public Administration at the National Academy for Public Administration under the President of Ukraine, obtaining a Master of Public Administration. The degree was subsequently followed by a PhD in Economics, obtained in 2011.

Between the years of 1997 and 2005, Klymenko was an entrepreneur, founder and CEO of a number of companies. In particular, he co-founded the group of companies "Antaleks".

=== Political career ===
Beginning with 2005, Klymenko entered the civil service. He worked his way up to the position of Deputy Head of Donetsk, specialized in auditing large taxpayers.

==== Head of the State Tax Service of Donetsk ====
In 2010, he was appointed to the position of first deputy head of the State Tax Administration (STA) of the Donetsk region. Subsequently, in September 2010, Klymenko became the head of the State Tax Administration of Donetsk. By November 2010, the region had collected over UAH 2 billion in taxes, the highest figure in the history of the Donetsk State Tax Administration.

==== Head of the State Tax Administration of Ukraine ====
On February 18, 2011, by the Decree of the President of Ukraine, Klymenko was appointed to the position of Deputy Head of the State Tax Service of Ukraine before becoming head of the said authority in November 2011. As head of the authority, Klymenko developed standards of accounting and reporting in the field of transfer pricing.

Klymenko implemented a network of standardized and unified service centers for taxpayers, which grew by the end of 2012 to over 470 in Ukraine. In February 2014, it numbered more than 5500. He also opened a dedicated Central Office to service large taxpayers.

In 2012, he initiated a moratorium on conducting audits of SMEs.

==== Minister of Revenues and Duties of Ukraine ====
On December 24, 2012, Klymenko was appointed, by the Decree of the President of Ukraine No. 739/2012, to the new position of Minister of Revenue and Duties of Ukraine in the Azarov government of President Viktor Yanukovich.

The position brought under the same roof the activities of two ministries, which were integrated under Klymenko's stint in 6 months. As minister, he streamlined the country's tax system, reducing the number of taxes from 135 to 22. In a second stage, the number of taxes was supposed to decline to 9-10. As a result, Ukraine moved up by 33 points in the World Bank's Doing Business ranking between 2012 and 2014. (Note: Klymenko's reforms sought to reduce tax evasion and increase the state's efficiency in collecting taxes. To this end, Klymenko opened the first "Accredited Key Certification Center", which issues keys for electronic digital signatures to taxpayers. Klymenko also introduced Ukraine's first Digital Taxpayer Office. Working with auditors of PriceWaterhouseCoopers, Klymenko approved a five-year strategy for the Ministry of Revenues and Duties. In order to promote entrepreneurship, a Council for the encouragement of investments and entrepreneurship was created during Klymenko’s tenure at the Ministry.)

On February 27, 2014, after the fall of Yanukovich, the Verkhovna Rada sacked the Second Azarov Government and dismissed all Ministers, including Oleksandr Klymenko. Klymenko left Ukraine in February 2014, taking refuge in (the capital of Russia) Moscow. According to Klymenko he went into exile "for reasons of security, I would not want to call Moscow my place of residence."

=== In exile (2014 - ) ===
On April 15, 2014, Klymenko's assets in the European Union were frozen when the former minister was placed on the European sanctions list.

Then, Klymenko was issued a notice of suspicion of abuse of power and wanted by the General Prosecutor of Ukraine for the creation of tax evasion scheme.

Klymenko has denied all charges levied against him and has called them "groundless". As a result, he became the first official of the Yanukovych era to judicially attack the said charges. On August 6, the Shevchenkivskiy District Court of Kyiv City ordered the SSU to refute the information pertaining to Klymenko's involvement in tragic events in Odesa on May 2. This information had been disseminated by an employee of the Security Service of Ukraine (SBU), Katerina Kosareva, without providing any evidence. Klymenko filed defamation charges against the SBU and, on November 3, the appellate court found in his favor, judging the information as being "apocryphal". (Note: On August 22, Klymenko's representative, Richard D. Heideman, an American lawyer specialized in human rights protection, said that the investigators from the Prosecutor General's Office had not yet properly presented Klymenko the list of charges he is accused of committing and refused to provide a copy of this document. Heideman underlined that, de facto, all investigative actions in Klymenko's case had been "carried out without giving Klymenko a chance to defend himself". According to Heideman, the reasons cited by authorities to deny the lawyer's access to documents are "pointless" and "groundless".)

Since he left Ukraine Klymenko is living in Moscow; Russian prosecutors refuse to extradite him to Ukraine and have stated that they have not received such a request from Ukraine, despite the latter's claims saying otherwise. On 19 December 2014 Klymenko stated: “I hope I will go back to Ukraine in the immediate future" and that he was "prepared to face the Ukrainian people and look at them with my own eyes. And I'm extending my helping hand to my people without stopping for a moment”.

On 17 November 2017 Klymenko was charged with high treason claiming he had "deliberately harmed the economic and information security of Ukraine, sovereignty, territorial integrity and inviolability of our state during his tenure."

=== Involvement in Ukrainian politics ===
In April 2014, in one of his first interviews, Klymenko called the (Ukrainian) Yatsenyuk government's intention of dividing the Ministry of Revenue and Duties in separate entities a "systemic mistake". Afterwards, Ukrainian authorities decided not to follow with their plan. (Note: Oleksandr Klymenko skeptically evaluated most of the new government’s attempts at tax reform, criticizing the idea of introducing a tax on deposits, a planned increase in excise taxes as well as the expansion of the real estate tax to include more citizens. He noted that these measures would mostly hit ordinary citizens, as well as SMEs and hamper the country’s economic recovery. The former minister also criticized the idea of introducing a military tax, intended to provide financial support to counter-terrorist operations in eastern Ukraine. Klymenko pointed to the inherent social injustice such a tax would bring and dismissed the government’s estimations of the amount it would collect, providing his own analysis that Kyiv had overstated its value by a factor of 10. Oleksandr Klymenko has also opposed the introduction of VAT accounts in Ukraine. He called the Government's intention to use them as "an attempt to put out the fire with gasoline". According to the former minister’s calculations, the use of VAT accounts would actually become a turnover tax that will deprive business of 1/5th of its financial resources. According to Klymenko, VAT accounts will not perform their declared function of reducing tax violations, as new schemes of false export and "encashment" will pop up and circumvent the system. The former minister is also commenting on tax policy issues related to the anti-terrorist operation in eastern Ukraine. In particular, he has repeatedly voiced his ideas how to simplify the work of entrepreneurs in the ATO area, given the force majeure situation – the creation of temporary taxpayers’ servicing points in flash points, the cancellation of penalties for entrepreneurs from the counter-terrorism operation area and reducing the list of documents required.)

On August 14, 2014, Internet edition "Glavkom", with reference to sources close to negotiations between Ukraine and IMF, said that the International Monetary Fund consults with the former Minister Klymenko on matters of Ukrainian tax reform. Earlier, Ukrainian media have drawn attention to the fact that the tax laws proposed by the Yatsenyuk Government were inspired by Oleksandr Klymenko's 2012 tax reforms.

In an interview with CNN's Christine Amanpour, Klymenko reiterated his support for a united Ukraine saying that “'Donbass has always been and is part of Ukraine” but that the region should be allowed to decide for itself where they should belong. Klymenko is also the founder of an initiative dedicated to find solutions for the Donbass, called “Restoring Donbas”. (Note: On August 24, 2015, Oleksandr Klymenko released the video "Match for Ukraine". He compares Ukrainian politics with a cruel football match. He claims that "the state loses years of experience and knowledge, when it is getting rid of the players from the former team". In the video "Reconciliation" Klymenko provides answers to questions about events in Donetsk airport in February 2014 and after. In September 2015 Klymenko published the article "Underdeveloped Ukraine". He described the scenario with the forecast for the development of events in Ukraine by 2020 if all the negative trends that are today preserved. Also he offered a unique way for Ukraine, which could lead the country to success. On September 21, Oleksandr Klymenko carried out a press conference, where he answered all the thorny questions of journalists and told about his political agenda. During a press conference Kyimenko presented his new video “Frank conversation“. Politician answers questions of ordinary Ukrainian family, "he says frankly about himself and invites to talk about the future of Ukraine all who are not indifferent." In addition, Klymenko states that he is open to dialogue and ready to answer all the questions, which bother Ukrainians, via the social networks and a special section of his website #Ask Klymenko. The premiere of the video "Fighting for your future" was held on September 30. Klymenko told that even a simple pen can be more efficient than tanks during the fighting for the interests of Ukraine. Patriotism is really multifaceted. We can fight for justice and the protection of national interests not only with the help of the weapon. If the reforms aimed at building of new innovative economy are carried out, Ukraine will be able to avoid the pessimistic economic scenarios. It was stated in the article "Economic Pamphlet About Ukraine" by Klymenko. The main engine of innovation economy can and should be human asset. In the article New Europe «EU: JUDGE, JURY, EXECUTIONER», Klymenko told that EU is involved in political “clashes” in Ukraine. On October 11, the fifth video «FOR THE JUSTICE» was published. Oleksandr Klymenko is ready to be responsible for each signature during the work in Ministry. His prosecution is political in its nature. All investigations of his case in Ukraine are carried out opaquely, without evidence and breaking the rules of procedure. The Court has repeatedly decided in favor of Oleksandr Klymenko. It has denied all groundless accusations that sounded towards him from the authorities.)

== Awards and ratings ==
=== Awards ===
- 02.07.2007 – Letter of award of the Donetsk City Council.
- 10.11.2010 – Lapel badge of the State Tax Administration of Ukraine for "Outstanding service".
- June 29, 2011 – Lapel badge of the State Customs Serviceof Ukraine for "Customs Security of the State" of the ІІ degree.
- 07.11.2011 – Lapel badge of the State Tax Service of Ukraine "Honorary Employee of the State Tax Service of Ukraine".
- February 22, 2012 – Departmental promotional award of the Department of the State Guard of Ukraine for "Contributing to the State Guard".
- June 27, 2012 – Lapel badge of the Ministry of Interior "Chevalier of the Law".
- August 24, 2012 – Awarded a special rank of the Main State Advisor of the Tax Service.
- December 14, 2013 – Awarded a special rank of the Main State Advisor of the Tax and Customs Affairs.

=== Ratings ===
2012 – 17th place in the rating of "top 200 most influential Ukrainians" according to "Focus" magazine.

2012 – 19th place in the rating of "TOP 100 most influential Ukrainians" according to "Korrespondent" magazine.

2013 – 12th place in the rating of "top 200 most influential Ukrainians" according to "Focus" magazine.

2013 – 8th place in the rating of "TOP 100 most influential Ukrainians" according to "Korrespondent" magazine.

== Charity ==
Ukrainian media reported about a number of charitable contributions made by O.Klymenko.
