= First Azarov government =

Government of Ukraine

First Azarov Government
- 15th Cabinet of Ukraine (since 1990)

- Date formed: March 11, 2010
- Date dissolved: December 3, 2012

People and organisations
- Head of state: Viktor Yanukovych
- Head of government: Mykola Azarov
- Deputy head of government: Valeriy Khoroshkovskyi
- No. of ministers: 18
- Member party: Party of Regions; Communist Party of Ukraine; Lytvyn Bloc
- Status in legislature: Coalition "Stability and reforms"
- Opposition cabinet: Dictatorship Resistance Committee
- Opposition party: Yulia Tymoshenko Bloc; NUNS
- Opposition leader: Serhiy Sobolev (head of shadow government)

History
- Legislature term: 5 years
- Predecessor: Second Tymoshenko government
- Successor: Second Azarov government

The first Azarov government (Ukrainian: Перший уряд Миколи Азарова, Russian: Первое правительство Николая Азарова) was Ukraine's cabinet from its appointment on March 11, 2010 until its dissolution on December 3, 2012. It continued to serve as a caretaker government until 24 December 2012, when the second Azarov government was appointed by president Viktor Yanukovych.

The cabinet was formed as part of the "Stability and Reform" coalition between the Party of Regions, Lytvyn Bloc and the Communist Party of Ukraine in the Verkhovna Rada, Ukraine's parliament. The government was led by prime minister Mykola Azarov, who succeeded the ousted second Tymoshenko government led by ex-prime minister Yulia Tymoshenko. The Azarov government worked in cooperation with President Yanukovych.

A November 2010 Razumkov Centre nationwide survey showed that only 13.2 percent of respondents fully supported the Azarov Government while 45 percent stated they did not.

Its composition was reshuffled by Yanukovych early in 2012.

== Termination ==
On December 3, 2012, the government became a caretaker government after Ukrainian president Viktor Yanukovich accepted the resignation of prime minister Mykola Azarov and his government following the 28 October 2012 parliamentary election. A number of government members, including Prime Minister Azarov, were elected to parliament in that election. In order to get these parliamentary mandates they were obliged to submit documents on the dismissal from their previous job to the Central Election Commission within 20 days after the election (by December 3).

On 9 December 2012, Yanukovych nominated Azarov for a new term as prime minister. This nomination was approved by parliament on 13 December 2012. On 24 December 2012, the second Azarov government was appointed by President Yanukovych.

In January 2013, President Yanukovych stated the government "has not completely fulfilled the assigned tasks on ensuring the introduction of reform and economic growth. This led to the fact that the results in 2012 were much worse than expected".

== Controversy and criticism ==
Azarov's immediate predecessor Yulia Tymoshenko stated on the day the cabinet was elected "this government is completely made up of Ukrainian oligarchs"; she predicted the cabinet actions would lead to "megacorruption, the closure of strategic state programs, pressure on small and middle business and a return to stagnation and the absence of any reforms".

According to a February 2010 poll by the Kyiv Gorshenin Institute of Management Issues most Ukrainians wanted not a politician for prime minister but "a professional premier, who will implement unpopular reforms".

Ukraine's state budget for 2010 was adopted by parliament after a ten-minute-long hearing of the bill which consisted of a report by the finance minister and the head of the parliament's budget committee. The Verkhovna Rada 2010 budget was not presented at a parliament meeting, but approved on May 14, 2010.

=== Constitutional Court ruling ===
According to former president Victor Yushchenko the March 9, 2010 parliamentary amendment that made it possible for individual members of a parliamentary faction to join a coalition violated the Ukrainian Constitution, former Minister of Internal Affairs Yuriy Lutsenko accused Yanukovych of "trying to buy members of parliament for a new coalition" (President Viktor Yanukovych accused Lutsenko of badly handling the affairs at the Ministry of Internal Affairs before appointing Anatolii Mohyliov to Lutsenko's old position.) and Yulia Tymoshenko Bloc lawmaker Serhiy Mishchenko stated "that the Verkhovna Rada had shown to the average citizen a bad example of how to violate the country's laws and Constitution". Yushchenko did send a letter to Yanukovych with a request to veto the law on March 10. Yanukovych signed the law nevertheless. 56 lawmakers filed a challenge to the law who made these amendments possible on March 11, 2010, at the Constitutional Court of Ukraine. On March 16, 2010, Minister of Justice Oleksandr Lavrynovych stated that even if the Constitutional Court rules the amendments unconstitutional the format of the Ukrainian parliamentary coalition will remain unchanged because "the Constitutional Court's ruling becomes valid on the day of its announcement, not yesterday or the day before yesterday" and the Constitutional Court's ruling will apply only to measures intended to establish a new coalition in Ukraine in the future. On March 26, 2010, President Yanukovych told a delegation from the European Parliament "If the decision of the Constitutional Court will be that the coalition was formed illegally, then I will take a decision on a snap election, I will never go down the path of breaching the constitution that is in force". The Constitutional Court reviewing the case late March 2010. On urgent matters the court rules within weeks but on matters deemed less urgent it can take months or even longer. On March 29, 2010, former premier and Yulia Tymoshenko Bloc leader Yulia Tymoshenko accused "Representatives of Yanukovych" of trying to bribe and blackmail Constitutional Court judges in order to get a ruling that legitimates the coalition and the government. This was denied by Yanukovych's Party of Regions.

On April 8, 2010, the Constitutional Court ruled that the coalition supporting the Azarov government in parliament had been formed legally. The shadow government called the Constitutional Court ruling "cynical, hypocritical, and illegal".

=== Corruption ===
The Azarov government stated that it will fight corruption. However several of its members are assigned to two or more government positions, and, of course, are paid for them. That fact reflects direct disregard for the Constitution of Ukraine. Some of the members do not even qualify to the assigned positions either as in case with Valeriy Khoroshkovskiy who was elected to the Supreme Council of Justice. Some of the members of the government received their government assignments without a basic knowledge of the state language as in case with the Minister of Internal Affairs Mohyliov. The President Yanukovych gave him two months (until August 2010) to learn the language.

== Opposition government formation ==
On March 16, eight parliamentarian parties signed an application for the establishment of an association of opposing political forces to the ruling Azarov government. Among the eight opposition parties are All-Ukrainian Union "Fatherland", Rukh, European Party of Ukraine, People's Self-Defense, Reforms and Order Party, Motherland Defenders Party, Christian-Democratic Union, and Ukrainian Social-Democratic Party. Tymoshenko immediately nominated a prime minister for the future opposition government (so called shadow government), while the leader of the European Party Mykola Katerynchuk suggests not to rush and consolidate all possible political forces in a single formed opposition government. On March 31, 2010, all members of this government were named. It is headed by parliamentarian Serhiy Sobolev of Bloc of Yulia Tymoshenko. Its vice premier, Volodymyr Stretovych, was dismissed on 7 February 2011, because "he had finally taken the side of the government".

Arseniy Yatsenyuk formed another oppositional government in March 2010.

On 8 August 2011 All-Ukrainian Union "Fatherland", Rukh, European Party of Ukraine, People's Self-Defense, Reforms and Order Party, Motherland Defenders Party, Civil Position and Front for Change formed the Dictatorship Resistance Committee "to better coordinate our efforts".

== Composition ==
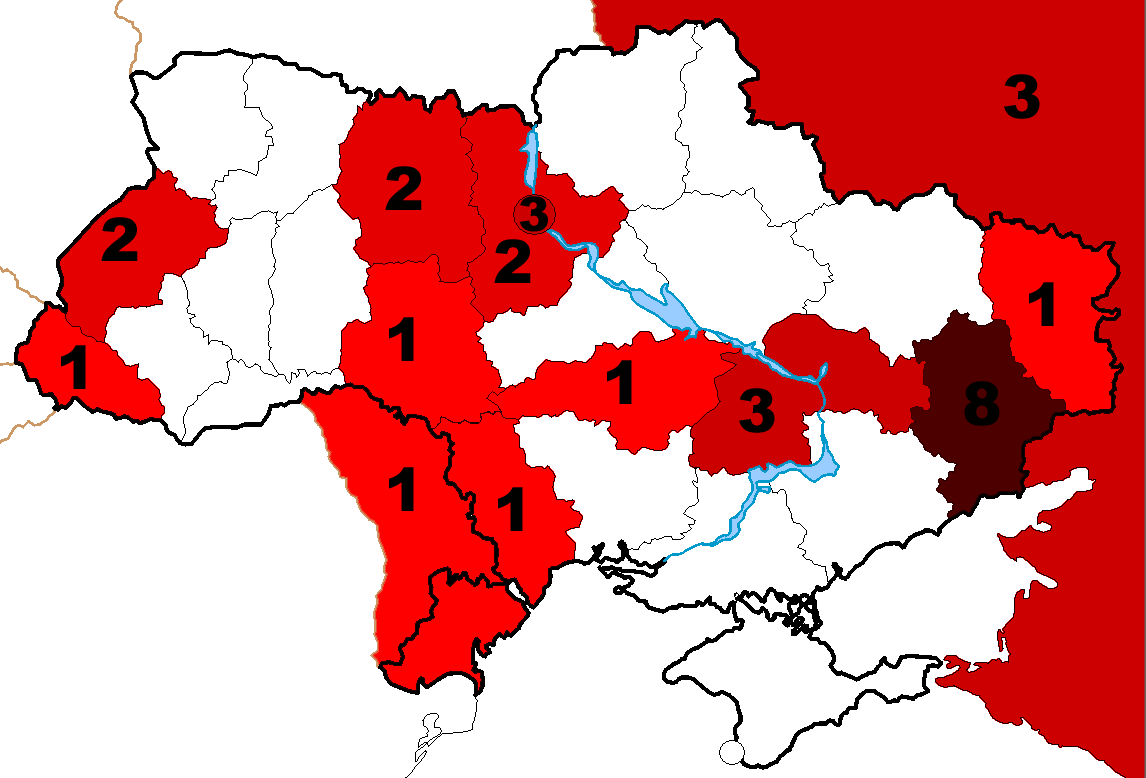
Regions and countries where the cabinet members (of March 11, 2010) were born.

On March 11, 2010, Verkhovna Rada of Ukraine approved the structure of the Cabinet of Ministers of Ukraine. Note, Tihipko even though is a leader of the Strong Ukraine party, he was elected to Cabinet as unaffiliated. Strong Ukraine in Verkhovna Rada is not an independent party. The same goes with Vasyl Tsushko who was a former member of the Socialist Party of Ukraine at the time of his appointment (he became the leader of that party in July 2010); Tsushko was appointed on quote of the Communist Party.

The Cabinet originally consisted of 29 ministers, four more than the previous government, but has since been trimmed down. At the time of installation the Cabinet contained the highest number of ministers in Europe, and ranked second in Europe in terms of the number of its vice premiers. 8 out of the original 29 Cabinet members were born in Donetsk and the Donetsk Oblast.

The Cabinet was (also at the time of its installation) Europe's only government that has no female members in its composition till Raisa Bohatyryova was appointed Minister of Healthcare and Vice Prime Minister of Ukraine on 14 February 2012. It was the first Ukrainian government without a female minister.

As of May 21, 2010, the Cabinet stated it was planning to create a "Ministry of Science, Technologies and Innovation of Ukraine".

Party key	Party of Regions
Party key	Lytvyn Bloc
Party key	Strong Ukraine
Party key	United Centre
Party key	Socialist Party of Ukraine
Party key	Non-party politician

Office		Party	Incumbent
Prime Minister			Mykola Azarov
First Vice Prime Minister	Minister of Economic Development and Trade		Andriy Klyuev (December 9, 2010 - February 14, 2012, he left the government to head the National Security and Defense Council of Ukraine)
First Vice Prime Minister			Valeriy Khoroshkovskyi (since February 22, 2012)
Vice Prime Minister	Minister of Infrastructure (responsible for hosting Euro 2012)		Borys Kolesnikov (from December 9, 2010)
Vice Prime Minister	Minister of Social Policy (since December 9, 2010)		Serhii Tihipko
Vice Prime Minister	Minister of Healthcare (since February 14, 2012)		Raisa Bohatyriova (since February 14, 2012)
Vice Prime Minister	Minister of Regional Development, Construction and Communal Living (December 9, 2010 - June 1, 2011)		Viktor Tykhonov (till June 1, 2011)
Vice Prime Minister (on issues of humanitarian policy)			Volodymyr Semynozhenko (till July 2, 2010)
Vice Prime Minister (on the "Security bloc")			Volodymyr Sivkovych (till October 13, 2010)
Vice Prime Minister (on issues of agrarian and industrial complex)			Viktor Slauta (till October 13, 2010)
Minister of Economy (Note: On December 9, 2010 Ministry of Economy reorganized into Ministry of Economical Development and Trade, under the responsibility of the First Vice Prime Minister (December 9, 2010 - February 14, 2012))			Vasyl Tsushko (till December 9, 2010)
Minister of Economy			Petro Poroshenko (since March 23, 2012)
Minister of Regional Development, Construction and Communal Living			Anatoliy Blyzniuk (July 12, 2011 - December 3, 2012)
Minister of Education and Science, Youth and Sport			Dmytro Tabachnyk
Minister of Culture and Tourism (Note: On December 9, 2010 Ministry of Culture and Tourism reorganized into Ministry of Culture)			Mykhailo Kulyniak
Minister of Defense			Mykhailo Yezhel (till February 8, 2012); Dmytro Salamatin
Minister of Internal Affairs			Vitaliy Zakharchenko
Minister of Agrarian Policy and Food			Mykola Prysyazhnyuk
Minister of Justice			Oleksandr Lavrynovych
Minister of Foreign Affairs			Kostyantyn Hryshchenko
Minister of Finance			Fedir Yaroshenko (till January 18, 2012)
Minister of Finance			Valeriy Khoroshkovsky (January 18 - February 22, 2012)
Minister of Finance			Yuriy Kolobov (since February 28, 2012)
Minister of Fuel and Energy (Note: On December 9, 2010 Ministry of Fuel and Energy reorganized into Ministry of Energy [Generation] and Coal [Mining])			Yuriy Boyko
Minister of Ecology and Natural Resources of Ukraine			Viktor Boyko (till July 2, 2010)
Minister of Ecology and Natural Resources of Ukraine			Mykola Zlochevsky (July 2, 2010 - April 20, 2012)
Minister of Ecology and Natural Resources of Ukraine			Eduard Stavytsky (since April 20, 2012)
Minister on Issues of Emergencies and Population Security from consequences of Chornobyl Catastrophe (Note: On December 9, 2010 Ministry on Issues of Emergencies and Population Security from consequences of Chornobyl Catastrophe reorganized into Ministry of Emergencies)			Nestor Shufrych (till July 10, 2010)
Minister on Issues of Emergencies and Population Security from consequences of Chornobyl Catastrophe			Viktor Baloha (November 12, 2010 - December 3, 2012)
Minister of Healthcare			Zynoviy Mytnyk (till December 21, 2010)
Minister of Healthcare			Illia Yemets (December 21, 2010 - May 24, 2011)
Minister of Healthcare			Oleksandr Anishchenko (May 24, 2011 - February 14, 2012)
Minister of Regional Development and Construction (Note: On December 9, 2010 Ministry of Regional Development and Construction reorganized into Ministry of Regional Development, Construction and Communal Living)			Volodymyr Yatsuba (till December 9, 2010)
Minister of Communal Living (Note: On December 9, 2010 Ministry of Communal Living reorganized into Ministry of Regional Development, Construction and Communal Living)			Oleksandr Popov (till June 17, 2010)
Minister of Communal Living			Yuriy Khivrich (June 17 - December 9, 2010)
Minister of Transportation and Communication (Note: On December 9, 2010 Ministry of Transportation and Communication reorganized into Ministry of Infrastructure)			Kostyantyn Yefymenko (till December 9, 2010)
Minister of Labor and Social Policy (Note: On December 9, 2010 Ministry of Labor and Social Policy reorganized into Ministry of Social Policy)			Vasyl Nadraha (till December 9, 2010)
Minister of Industrial Policy (Note: On December 9, 2010 Ministry of Industrial Policy reorganized into Ministry of Economical Development and Trade)			Dmytro Kolyesnikov (till December 9, 2010)
Minister of Coal Industry (Note: On December 9, 2010 Ministry of Coal Industry reorganized into Ministry of Energy [Generation] and Coal [Mining])			Yuriy Yashchenko (till December 9, 2010)
Minister of Family, Youth and Sports (Note: On December 9, 2010 Ministry of Family, Youth and Sports merged into Ministry of Education and Sciences)			Ravil Safiullin (till December 9, 2010)
Minister of Cabinet of Ministers (Note: On December 9, 2010 Ministry of Cabinet of Ministers lost its ministerial portfolio)			Anatoliy Tolstoukhov (till December 9, 2010)

=== Changes since June 2010 ===
On June 2, 2010, deputy-minister of Environmental Protection Bogdan Presner was sacked for accepting a bribe of $200,000 (he was sentenced to nine years in prison in October 2011). On June 17, 2010, Minister on Communal Living Oleksandr Popov (Party of Regions) was replaced by Yuriy Hivrich.

On July 2, 2010, Minister of Environmental Protection Viktor Boyko (Bloc Lytvyn) was replaced by Mykola Zlochevskiy and Vice Prime Minister Volodymyr Seminozhenko was fired by the Verkhovna Rada (Ukrainian parliament) the same day. A draft resolution proposing the dismissal of Semynozhenko was submitted by lawmaker Olha Bodnar of Bloc Yulia Tymoshenko. On July 10, 2010, Minister of Extraordinary Situations Nestor Shufrych was dismissed by Verkhovna Rada. For his dismissal voted 256 deputies. However Viktor Yanukovych found a new assignment for Shufrych and appointed him as the assistant to the secretary of the Council for National Security. Shufrych's duties were temporary assigned to Volodymyr Antonets till Mikhail Bolotskikh was appointed acting minister on July 23, 2010. Soon after the motion to overturn the 2004 Constitutional amendments was filed on July 14 by the representatives of the Azarov Government, Vasyl Tsushko, previously as an unaffiliated member of the government, was elected the leader of the Socialist Party of Ukraine (extra parliamentarian party, non-coalition) on July 24, 2010.

On October 13, 2010, President Yanukovych sacked two deputy prime ministers (Viktor Slauta and Volodymyr Sivkovich). The sackings were the first case when Yanukovych used the powers granted to him by this month's constitutional court ruling when 2004 constitutional amendments were overturned.

On November 12, 2010, President Yanukovych appointed Viktor Baloha (United Centre) Minister of Emergencies and Minister of the Protection of the Population from the Chernobyl disaster. According to Baloha this did not mean his party would join the coalition. Early 2010 United Centre had rejected any possibility of joining a parliamentary coalition with the Communist Party of Ukraine.

Another mayor reshuffle took place in December 2010, which reduced the number of ministers This was part of an administrative reform set in motion by Ukrainian president Viktor Yanukovych with the aim to reduce the number of civil servants in Ukraine. (see below Yanukovych Administration Reform)

A number of deputy ministers were dismissed early April 2011.

Minister of Health Zynoviy Mytnyk was dismissed on May 17, 2011, because he had "failed to properly organize the work of the ministry"; Oleksandr Anishchenko was appointed for the post on May 24, 2010.

Anatolii Mohyliov was replaced as Minister of Internal Affairs by Vitaliy Zakharchenko in November 2011.

Minister of Finance Fedir Yaroshenko resigned on 18 January 2012, and was replaced by Valeriy Khoroshkovsky the same day.

Minister of Defence Mykhailo Yezhel was sacked by President Yanukovich on 8 February 2012, and replaced by Dmytro Salamatin the same day

Raisa Bohatyryova was appointed Minister of Healthcare and Vice Prime Minister of Ukraine on 14 February 2012; she partly changed places with former First Vice Prime Minister of Ukraine-Minister of Economic Development and Trade Andriy Klyuyev who became Secretary of the National Security and Defense Council of Ukraine in her place while Oleksandr Anischenko lost his job as health minister.

On 22 February 2012, Khoroshkovsky was reshuffled to First Vice Prime Minister-Minister and dismissed as finance minister Yuriy Kolobov was appointed finance minister on 28 February 2012. On 9 March 2012 President Yanukovych stated he wanted Petro Poroshenko to work in the government on the post of economic development and trade minister. Poroshenko was appointed economic development and trade minister of Ukraine by Yanukovych on 23 March 2012.

Vice Prime Minister (Minister of Social Policy) Serhii Tihipko became a member of Party of Regions when that party merged with his former party Strong Ukraine on 17 March 2012; Strong Ukraine thus had no longer a minister in this Cabinet.

Mykola Zlochevsky was dismissed from the post of Ecology and Natural Resources Minister and appointed as the deputy secretary of the National Security and Defense Council on 20 April 2012. Eduard Stavytsky was appointed the Minister of Ecology and Natural Resources on April 20, 2012. Mykola Azarov introduced the new minister to the Cabinet on April 23, 2012.

On 20 November 2012, Viktor Baloha resigned as Ministers of Emergencies because he preferred to take in the seat in the Ukrainian Parliament he had won in the October 2012 Ukrainian parliamentary election.

== Policy ==
The aims of the cabinet are:

- Reducing the gap between the rich and the poor in Ukraine; which is characterized by these policies:
  - Raise the minimum wage in 2010 to 888 Hryvnya.
  - In April 2012 Prime Minister Azarov stated that the Azarov Government was planning to increase pensions and wages four times in 2013 - once every quarter - and to increase social benefits twice.
- Improve the living standards of Ukrainians; which is characterized by these policies:
  - Creating a state "anti-crisis food basket" and a "state anti-crisis medical basket";
  - Stabilization of the price situation on the consumer market and the energy market.
- Introduce "the European standards of social protection" in Ukraine; which is characterized by these policies:
  - Reform of the system of social standards and privileges;
  - Improvement of the social protection of children;
  - "Fight" against the demographic crisis.
- Reviewing Ukraine's cooperation with international financial organizations;
- Judicial reform;
- Reduction of corruption; which is characterized by these policies:
  - The introduction of "a single window" in the registration system for entrepreneurial activity and regulation;
  - Transparent state purchases;
  - Allocation of land plots;
- Economic growth, based on innovative technologies;
- Improving the financial situation in state companies;
- Reform the housing utility sector; which is characterized by these policies:
  - Provision of citizens with affordable housing;
  - The formation of a state order for the construction of social housing for young people, public sector employees, poor families, and disabled persons.
- Strengthen the middle class;
- Ensuring the rights and freedoms of citizens in Ukraine and their protection outside the country.

Other priorities of the government are the preparations for expected flooding, preparations for spring agricultural work and the improvement of medical services.

In order to increase state revenues with at least Hryvnya 10 billion the government is planning to step up privatization in 2010.

Led by the Party of Regions faction in March 2010 a draft law on the judiciary and a new criminal procedural code was shelved and the introduction of anti-corruption legislation was pushed back from April 2010 to January 2011 by the Verkhovna Rada.

On November 30, 2010, Yanukovych vetoed a new tax code made by the Azarov Government and earlier approved by the Verkhovna Rada but protested against in rallies across Ukraine (one of the largest protests since the 2004 Orange Revolution). Yanukovych signed a new Tax Code on December 3, 2010.

in an (Ukraine's) economy analysis of March 2014 The Economist claims that poor economic policies by the Azarov Government had weakened the state's finances.

== Yanukovych Administration Reform ==
On December 9, 2010, the President of Ukraine reloaded a new government. According to the decree, the number of ministries was reduced from 20 to 16 and the number of cabinet employees (1,174 people at the time) is to be more than halved.

List of ministries with their respective agencies (if present)

- Ministry of Economy is reorganized into Ministry of Economic Development and Trade (coordinated by the First Deputy Premier)
  - State Service of Export Control
  - State Committee of Statistics reorganized into State Service of Statistics
  - State Service of Technical Regulation
  - National Agency in ensuring of energy resources effective use reorganized into State Agency of Energy Effectiveness and Savings
  - State Agency in directing national projection and State Agency of investments and development merged into State Agency of investments and directing national projects
  - State Committee of state material reserves reorganized into State Agency of Reserves
  - Ministry of Industrial Policy reorganized into State Agency in directing state corporation rights and property
- Ministry of Transportation and Communications reorganized into Ministry of Infrastructure with several state services (coordinated by a Deputy Premier)
  - State Aviation Service
  - State Automobile-Transportation Service
  - State Service of Communication
  - State Service of Sea and River Transportation
  - State Service of Automobile Roads
  - National Agency in preparation and conduction the final portion of Euro 2012 championship of football in Ukraine and realization of infrastructural projects
- Ministry of Regional Development and Construction and Ministry of Communal Living merge into Ministry of Regional Development, Construction, and Communal Living (coordinated by a Deputy Premier)
  - State Architectural-Building Inspection
- Ministry of Labor and Social Policy reorganized into Ministry of Social Policy and State Inspection in labor affairs (coordinated by a Deputy Premier)
  - State Inspection in Labor Affairs
  - State Committee in Veteran Affairs reorganized into State Service in affairs of handicapped and veterans
  - Pension Fund
- Ministry of Agrarian Policy reorganized into Ministry of Agrarian Policy and Food
  - State inspection of rural management
  - State Committee of Veterinary Medicine reorganized into State Veterinary Services
  - State Committee of land resources reorganized into State Agency of land resources
  - State Committee of forest management reorganized into State Agency of forest resources
  - State Committee of fishing management reorganized into State Agency of fishing management
- Ministry of Internal Affairs
  - State Migration Service
- Ministry in protection of nature reorganized into Ministry of Ecology and Natural Resources
  - State Ecological Inspection
  - State Service of Geology and Subsoil
  - State Committee of Water Management reorganized into State Agency of Water Resources
  - National Agency of Ecological Investments reorganized into State Agency of Ecological Investments
- Ministry of Fuel and Energy and Ministry of Coal [Mining] Industry merge into Ministry of Energy and Coal [Mining] Industry
- Ministry of Foreign Affairs
- Ministry of Culture and Tourism reorganized into Ministry of Culture
  - State Agency in Cinema Affairs
- Ministry of Emergencies reorganized into Ministry of Emergencies
  - State Service of Mining Supervision and Industrial Safety
  - State Agency in directing the Zone of alienation
  - State Inspection of Techno-genetic Safety
- Ministry of Defense
- Ministry of Education and Science and Ministry in affairs of family, youth and sport merge into Ministry of Education and Science, Youth and Sport
  - State Service of Intellectual Property
  - State Service of Youth and Sport
  - State Committee of Science, Innovations, and Informatics reorganized into State Agency of Science, Innovations, and Informatics
- Ministry of Health Protection
  - State Sanitary-Epidemiological Service
  - State Inspection in control of medicine quality and State Committee in Drug Control Affairs merged into State Service of Medicine and Drug Control
  - State Service to counteract HIV-infection/AIDS and other socially dangerous disease
- Ministry of Finance
  - State Treasury Service
  - State Tax Administration reorganized into State Tax Services
  - State Customs Service
  - State Assay Service
  - State Committee of Financial Monitoring reorganized into State Service of Financial Monitoring
  - Main Control-Revisionary Directorate reorganized into State Financial Inspection
- Ministry of Justice
  - State Committee of Archives reorganized into State Archive Services
  - State Executive Service
  - State Department in affairs of executions reorganized into State Penitentiary Services
  - State Registration Service
  - State Service in Protection of Personal Data

Other state services and agencies

Liquidated

- State Committee of Industrial Safety, Labor Security, and Mining Supervision, functions transferred to agencies of Ministry of Emergencies
- Supreme Attestation Commission, functions transferred to Ministry of Education and Science, Youth and Sport
- Ukrainian Institute of National Memory
- State Committee in affairs of regulatory policy and entrepreneurship
- State Committee of Nationalities and Religions

Renamed

- State Committee of Nuclear Regulation into State Inspection of Nuclear Regulation
- National Space Agency into State Space Agency

== See also ==
- Cabinet of Ministers of Ukraine
