= VTB Capital =

Russian state-owned international bank

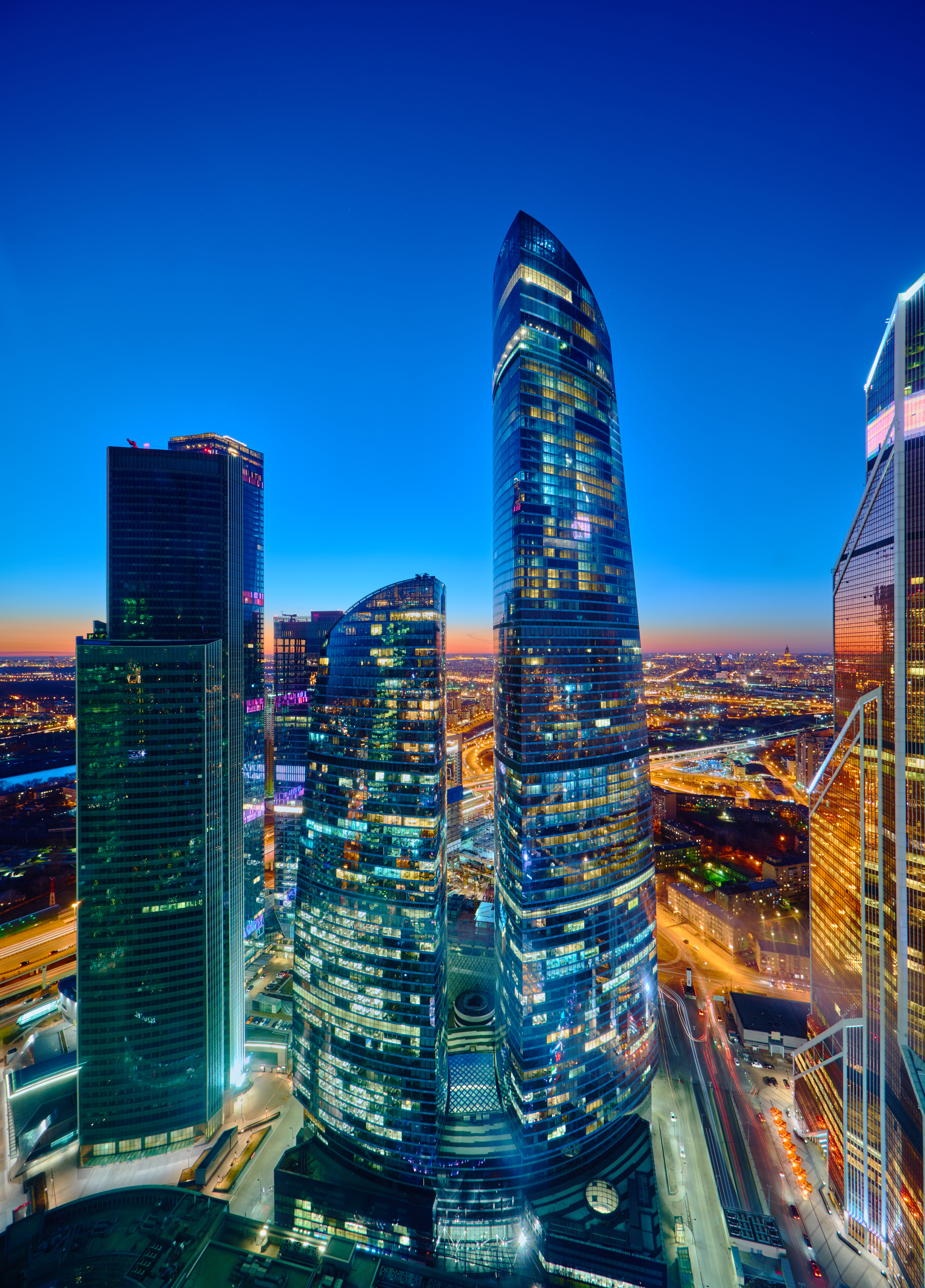
- Headquarters at Federation Tower
- Industry: Investment Banking
- Founded: 2008; 18 years ago
- Headquarters: Moscow, Russia
- Number of locations: Moscow, London, Singapore, Dubai, Hong Kong, Vienna, Sofia and Kyiv
- Key people: Alexei Yakovitsky
- Services: Debt, Equity, Global Commodities Markets, Developing Investment Management, and Advising Clients on M&A and ECM
- Revenue: $671 million (2017)
- Operating income: −$831 million (2017)
- Net income: $177,749 (2017)
- Total assets: $1.21 billion (2017)
- Total equity: $957 million (2017)
- Website: www.vtbcapital.com

VTB Capital (Russian: ВТБ Капитал) is a Russian investment bank. It is one of the three strategic business arms of VTB Group, along with the corporate and retail businesses.

VTB Capital has been ranked among the top investment banks in Russia, the CIS and Central and Eastern Europe regions according to industry league tables, including Bloomberg, Thomson Reuters and Dealogic. In 2013, the Dealogic league tables ranked VTB Capital among the top investment banks in terms of deal volumes for M&A, Debt and Equity Capital Markets across the Central and Eastern Europe (CEE), Russia and CIS regions.

== History ==
Created in 2008, the business is headquartered in Moscow with offices in London, Singapore, Dubai, Hong Kong, Vienna, Sofia and Kyiv. To establish VTB Capital, numerous bankers from Deutsche Bank's Moscow office were hired.

In 2015 VTB Capital ranked first in Dealogic's FY 2015 league tables in the Debt and Equity capital markets bookrunners and M&A Advisor categories across Russia and the CIS. In the same year VTB Capital maintained the top position in Dealogic's ranking on the volume of transactions in the Russian domestic debt capital market. The company arranged 70 transactions for a total of US $5.447 billion with 25 per cent market share. VTB Capital also ranked first in ECM in Russia and the CIS, having arranged eight transactions, amounting to US $720 million and taking a record 40.8 per cent share of the market. In M&A, VTB Capital was one of the top two leaders in Central and Eastern Europe. The bank also advised on a total of 15 transactions, equivalent to a volume of US $11.33 billion with a Russian market share of 23 per cent.

== Management ==
VTB Capital is led by Alexei Yakovitsky, CEO and Chairman of VTB Capital holding companies Board of Directors.

== Activities ==
Since 2009 VTB Capital has run an annual international investment forum, Russia Calling!, in both London and Moscow. Each month, VTB publishes a Russian Economy Monthly report.

== Subsidiaries ==
In 2018 in response to sanctions imposed by western countries on a range of state-linked Russian companies a New-York based subsidiary of VTB Capital in the US was reportedly sold to its management and was renamed into Xtellus Capital Partners in order to continue their work. Following the deal VTB said that there would be no direct VTB Bank presence in the US.

In December 2024, VTB acquired an agriculture company located in southern Russia. The company is now known by the name of Agrocomplex Labinski.

== Corporate affairs ==
=== Litigation ===
VTB claimed that Nutritek was fraudulently misrepresenting the value of dairy companies it was selling to another company, Russagroprom LLC. The 2013 decision contributed to the United Kingdom's Supreme Court substantially restating the English company law position in relation to piercing of the corporate veil.
