= Vitaliy Zakharchenko =

Ukrainian-Russian politician and businessman

- Віталій Захарченко; Виталий Захарченко
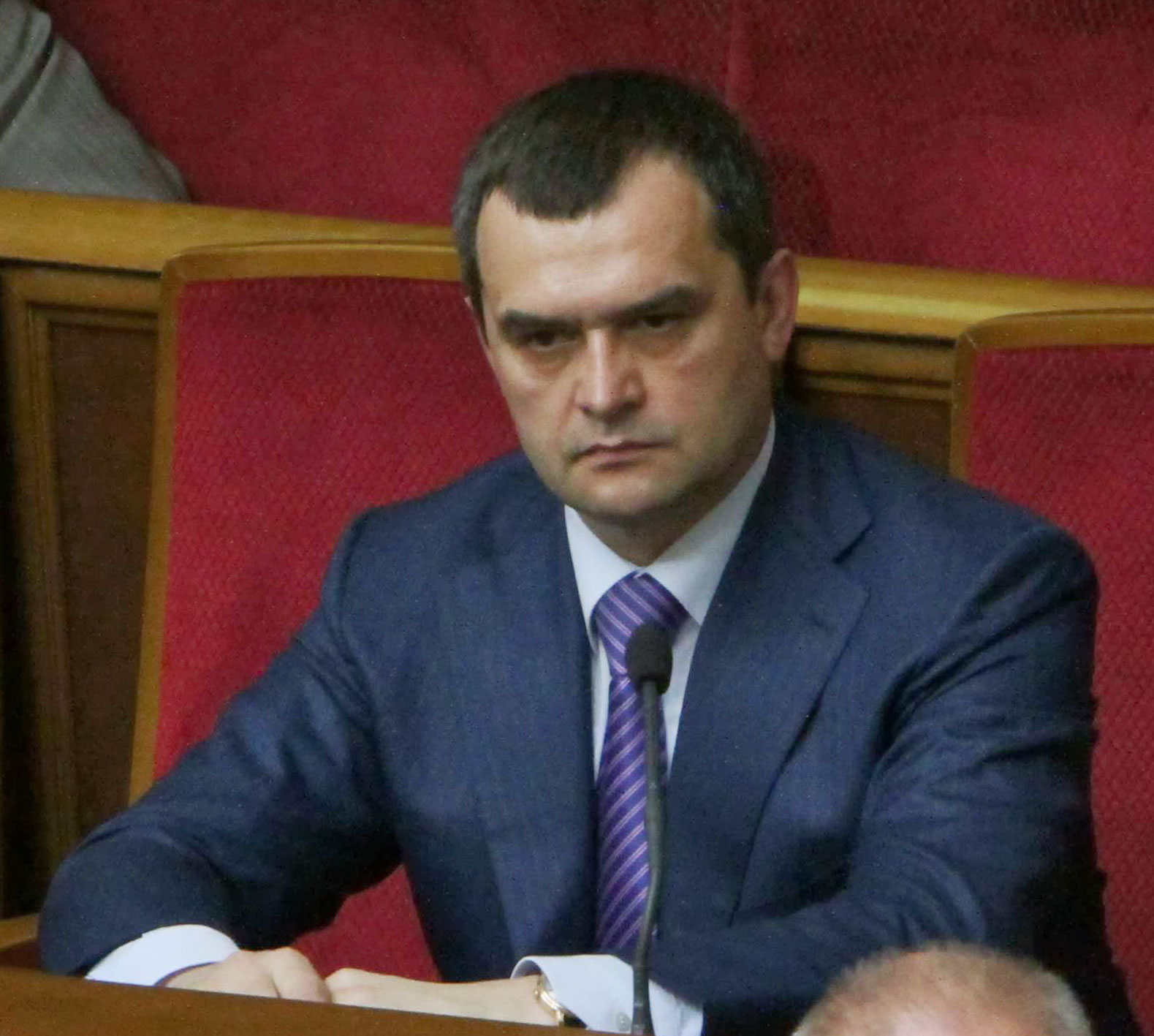
- Zakharchenko in 2013

Minister of Internal Affairs of Ukraine
- In office 7 November 2011 – 21 February 2014
- Preceded by: Anatolii Mohyliov
- Succeeded by: Arsen Avakov (Acting)

Head of the State Tax Service of Ukraine
- In office 25 December 2010 – 7 November 2011
- President: Viktor Yanukovych
- Prime Minister: Mykola Azarov

Personal details
- Born: 20 January 1963 (age 63) Kostiantynivka, Ukrainian SSR, Soviet Union (now Ukraine)
- Party: Independent
- Spouse: Lyudmyla
- Children: 2 daughters

Military service
- Allegiance: Soviet Union; Ukraine
- Branch/service: Ministry of Internal Affairs
- Years of service: 1981
- Rank: Major general

Vitaliy Yuriyovych Zakharchenko (Ukrainian: Віталій Юрійович Захарченко, Russian: Виталий Юрьевич Захарченко, born 20 January 1963) is a Ukrainian and Russian politician who is a senior consultant at Russia's Rostec state corporation. He previously served as Ukraine's Minister of Internal Affairs from 7 November 2011 until he was suspended from his duties by the Ukrainian parliament on 21 February 2014. His position as Minister of the Interior, had given him control over the Ukrainian national police service, the Militsiya. One day prior to his dismissal, he had signed a decree calling for the police to be armed with combat weapons, to be used in their ongoing battles against protesters in Kyiv's Maidan Nezalezhnosti. The Council of the European Union sanctioned him effective 6 March 2014 for misuse of public funds and human rights violations (Decision 2014/119/CFSP), and the United States sanctioned him effective 22 December 2015 (81 FR 69190).

== Biography ==
Vitaliy Zakharchenko was born in Kostiantynivka, in the Ukrainian SSR of the Soviet Union. He was graduated from the Riga branch of the Minsk Higher School of Interior of the USSR in 1991. He began his career with the police in the Donetsk Oblast in July 1981. From May 2008 to June 2010 he held leading positions in the State Tax Administration in Poltava Oblast. President Viktor Yanukovych appointed Zakharchenko as head of the State Tax Administration of Ukraine on 25 December 2010. On 7 November 2011 the president appointed him Minister of Internal Affairs, replacing Anatolii Mohyliov who had been named the new Prime Minister of Crimea; simultaneously, Yanukovych appointed Oleksandr Klymenko as head of the State Tax Administration of Ukraine. According to Ukrainian media Zakharchenko is a close friend of President Yanukovych's son, Viktor Viktorovych Yanukovych, though President Yanukovych, through his press service, denied that he appointed individuals to top government positions based on their personal loyalty and closeness to his family rather than qualifications. Since Zakharchenko was an officer of the Interior Ministry, he was not allowed to be a member of a political party.

There is a suspicion that the minister owned the single active golden ore deposit in Muzhievo, Zakarpattia Oblast.

The Ukrainian parliament suspended Zakharchenko from his duties on 21 February 2014 for using violence against protesters in the February 2014 Euromaidan riots. Five days later an arrest warrant was put out for him and he is currently wanted on murder charges. Since then he was last seen in Russia on 13 April 2014 during a joint press conference with Viktor Yanukovych and former Prosecutor General of Ukraine Viktor Pshonka in Rostov-on-Don.

According to Krymedia.ru, on 16 January 2015 Zakharchenko was planning to arrive in Sevastopol for a celebration of establishment of Berkut police anti-riots unit and present his charity fund "Yugo-Vostok" (South-East). The same day, Zakharchenko announced that he acquired Russian citizenship.

He was stripped of his Ukrainian citizenship on 4 February 2023.

Political offices
Preceded by Oleksandr Papaika	Head of the State Tax Service of Ukraine; 2010–2011	Succeeded by Oleksandr Klymenko
Preceded by Anatolii Mohyliov	Minister of Internal Affairs; 2011–2014	Succeeded by Arsen Avakov
