= 2002 Ukrainian parliamentary election =

- 31 March 2002

All 450 seats in the Verkhovna Rada 226 seats needed for a majority
- Turnout: 69.27% (▼1.51 pp)
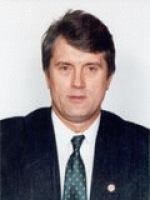

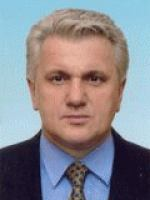

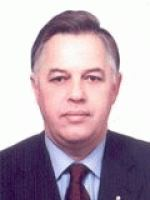

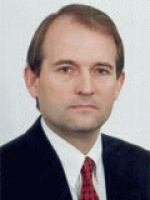

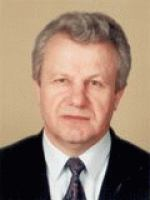

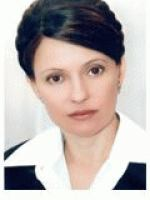
	First party	Second party	Third party
Leader	Viktor Yushchenko	Volodymyr Lytvyn	Petro Symonenko
Party	Our Ukraine Bloc	For United Ukraine!	KPU
Leader since	15 February 2002	15 December 2001	19 June 1993
Leader's seat	Party list	Party list	Party list
Last election	62 seats	36 seats	121 seat, 25.44%
Seats won	113	101	64
Seat change	▲51	▲65	▼57
Popular vote	6,108,088	3,051,056	5,178,074
Percentage	24.49% (PR)	12.23% (PR)	20.76% (PR)
Swing	–	–	▼4.48%
	Fourth party	Fifth party	Sixth party
Leader	Viktor Medvedchuk	Oleksandr Moroz	Yulia Tymoshenko
Party	SDPU(o)	SPU	Tymoshenko Bloc
Leader since	October 1998	26 October 1991	9 February 2001
Leader's seat	Party list	Party list	Party list
Last election	17 seats, 4.14%	17 seats	New
Seats won	24	23	22
Seat change	▲7	▲6	New
Popular vote	1,331,460	1,780,642	1,882,087
Percentage	6.52% (PR)	7.14% (PR)	7.54% (PR)
Swing	▲2.38%	–	New
Chairman of the Verkhovna Rada before election
Ivan Plyushch
NDP
Elected Chairman of the Verkhovna Rada
Volodymyr Lytvyn
For United Ukraine!

Parliamentary elections were held in Ukraine on 31 March 2002. The Our Ukraine bloc emerged as the largest faction in the Verkhovna Rada, winning 113 of the 450 seats.

The Organization for Security and Co-operation in Europe noted at the time that there were physical assaults and harassment of candidates and campaign workers associated with opposition political parties prior to the March election. The Yulia Tymoshenko Bloc complained of campaign related violations including "an informal 'media blackout,' [and] negatively slanted coverage".

== Electoral system ==
In this election, parallel voting was used. Half of the deputies to Verkhovna Rada (parliament of Ukraine) were elected on proportional basis, while the other half were elected by popular vote in single-mandate constituencies. In order to gain any (proportional) seats in Verkhovna Rada a party needed to receive at least 4% of the popular vote.

== Opinion polls ==
Pollster	Our Ukraine	Communists	ZaEdU	SDPU (o)	BYuT	Socialists	Vitrenko	Greens	Zh/M	KOP	Apple
All-Ukrainian Social Service (3/31/2002)	22%	20%	14%	8%	6%	5%	3.5%				
Razumkov Centre (3/29/2002)	26-28%	18-19%	7-8%	9-10%	7-8%	3.5-4.5%	4-5%	4.5-5.5%	4-5%	2.5-3.5%	2.5-3%
Politic's Institute (3/29/2002)	29-32%	19-21%	6-8%	7-9%	4-5%	4-5%		5-6%	4-5%		
Ukrainian Institute of Social Research and Center "Social Monitoring" (3/27/2002)	23-25%	17-19%	11-13%	10-12%	5.5-7%	3.5-4.5%	3-4%	4-5.5%	4-5.5%	2.5-4%	2.5-3.5%
Center SOCIS (3/27/2002)	31-33%	17-19%	5-6%	7-8%	3-4%	2-3%	2-3%	5-6%	4-5%		

== Conduct ==
On 29 March 2002 the Bloc of Yulia Tymoshenko won a case on defamation against the Chairman of the Tax Administration of Ukraine Mykola Azarov. The Shevchenkivsky District Court of the Kyiv city prohibited the Tax Administration of Ukraine to spread lies against the opposition electoral bloc.

Late at night on 29 March 2002 vice-governor of the Ivano-Frankivsk Oblast Mykola Shkriblyak was mortally wounded. Shkriblyak was a member of the Social Democratic Party of Ukraine (united) and he was a parliamentary candidate in the 90th electoral district. He died later in a local hospital.

== Results ==
The final election results differed greatly from the final opinion poll. The 2002 parliamentary elections were the first that substantially reduced fragmentation of the Verkhovna Rada and laid the groundwork for consolidation of political views in the parliament.

Yushchenko's Our Ukraine gathered most of its support from western and central regions of Ukraine, including the city of Kyiv. The Communist Party received most of its votes from eastern and southern regions, as well as from Crimea. For United Ukraine block, which included Viktor Yanukovych's Party of Regions, got most of its votes from eastern regions of Ukraine. Donetsk Oblast was the stronghold of the block, where it received more than twice the number of votes (36.83%) compared to the next highest supporting region: Sumy Oblast with 17.05% of the region's voters. Yulia Tymoshenko's block's support came predominantly from western regions, while the Socialists were most supported in the central regions. While the Tymoshenko block received more of the national vote compared to the Socialist Party, it did not gain a plurality in any of the regions, while the Socialist Party managed to secure plurality of votes in Poltava Oblast with 22.05%.

Party	Proportional			Constituency			Total seats	+/–
Party	Votes	%	Seats	Votes	%	Seats	Total seats	+/–
Bloc of Viktor Yushchenko "Our Ukraine"	6,108,088	24.49	70	3,353,053	13.73	43	113	+51
Communist Party of Ukraine	5,178,074	20.76	59	2,302,675	9.43	5	64	–58
For United Ukraine!	3,051,056	12.23	35	3,827,576	15.68	66	101	+65
Yulia Tymoshenko Bloc	1,882,087	7.54	22	13,326	0.05	0	22	New
Socialist Party of Ukraine	1,780,642	7.14	20	869,557	3.56	3	23	+6
Social Democratic Party of Ukraine (united)	1,626,721	6.52	19	561,415	2.30	5	24	+7
Nataliya Vitrenko Bloc (PSPU–YeU)	836,198	3.35	0	302,786	1.24	0	0	–17
Women for the Future	547,916	2.20	0	27,969	0.11	0	0	New
Team of Winter Generation	525,025	2.10	0				0	–1
Communist Party of Ukraine (renewed)	362,712	1.45	0	18,441	0.08	0	0	New
Party of Greens of Ukraine	338,252	1.36	0	51,305	0.21	0	0	–19
Apple	299,764	1.20	0	285,266	1.17	0	0	New
Unity (Ye–SDS–UPS)	282,491	1.13	0	504,920	2.07	3	3	New
Democratic Party of Ukraine–Democratic Union	227,393	0.91	0	320,164	1.31	4	4	+2
New Generation of Ukraine	201,157	0.81	0	11,651	0.05	0	0	New
Russian Bloc	190,839	0.77	0	29,789	0.12	0	0	–1
For Ukraine, Belarus and Russia	112,259	0.45	0				0	New
Communist Party of Workers and Peasants	106,904	0.43	0	174,100	0.71	0	0	New
Peasant Party of Ukraine	98,428	0.39	0	87,152	0.36	0	0	–12
Rehabilitation of the People of Ukraine Party	91,098	0.37	0	47,048	0.19	0	0	New
All-Ukrainian Party of Workers	88,842	0.36	0	44,621	0.18	0	0	–1
All-Ukrainian Association of Christians	75,174	0.30	0	15,252	0.06	0	0	New
Social Democratic Party of Ukraine	68,664	0.28	0				0	0
Bloc "Popular Movement of Ukraine" (NRUYe–Ts)	41,730	0.17	0	152,038	0.62	0	0	New
Bloc "Against all" (PPMSB)	29,665	0.12	0				0	New
Ukrainian Marine Party	29,025	0.12	0	38,743	0.16	1	1	New
People's Party of Depositors and Social Security	27,273	0.11	0	21,062	0.09	0	0	New
All-Ukrainian Party "New Force"	26,299	0.11	0	66,840	0.27	0	0	New
Christian Movement	23,591	0.09	0				0	New
Party of All-Ukrainian Union of the Left "Justice"	21,957	0.09	0	73,867	0.30	0	0	New
Ukrainian National Assembly	11,839	0.05	0	2,917	0.01	0	0	0
Bloc of Ukrainian Party and New World	11,048	0.04	0				0	New
Liberal Ukraine	8,535	0.03	0				0	New
Party of National Economic Development of Ukraine				50,203	0.21	1	1	+1
Communist Party of Working People				7,252	0.03	0	0	New
Christian Democratic Party of Ukraine				6,573	0.03	0	0	–2
Party of the Pensioners' Defenders of Ukraine				4,249	0.02	0	0	New
New Politics				3,836	0.02	0	0	New
Independents				9,218,247	37.75	94	94	–17
Against all	635,199	2.55	–	1,922,784	7.87	–	–	–
Total	24,945,945	100.00	225	24,416,677	100.00	225	450	0
Valid votes	24,945,945	96.28		24,416,677	94.37			
Invalid/blank votes	963,462	3.72		1,457,594	5.63			
Total votes	25,909,407	100.00		25,874,271	100.00			
Registered voters/turnout	37,403,661	69.27		37,403,661	69.18			
Source: Nohlen & Stöver, CLEA

=== By electoral district ===
The following table demonstrates all winners of the 225 electoral districts.

List of 225 Electoral districts							
№	Region		District		Candidate	Votes %	Party membership
№	Name	Seats	Name	Number	Candidate	Votes %	Party membership
1	AR Crimea	10	Simferopol-Tsentralny	001	Volodymyr Voyush	89.43	SDPU (u)
1	AR Crimea	10	Simferopol-Kyivsky	002	Lev Myrymskyi		Unaffiliated
1	AR Crimea	10	Dzhankoi	003	Serhiy Ivanov		Unaffiliated
1	AR Crimea	10	Yevpatoria	004	Anatoliy Rakhanskyi		Unaffiliated
1	AR Crimea	10	Kerch	005	Viktor Myronenko		Communist Party of Ukraine
1	AR Crimea	10	Feodosia	006	Valeriy Horbatov		Unaffiliated
1	AR Crimea	10	Yalta	007	Ihor Franchuk		Unaffiliated
1	AR Crimea	10	Sudak	008	Volodymyr Skliar		Unaffiliated
1	AR Crimea	10	Krasnoperekopsk	009	Valeriy Yevdokimov		SDPU (u)
1	AR Crimea	10	Bakhchysarai	010	Anatoliy Franchuk		Unaffiliated
2	Vinnytsia	8	Vinnytsia	011	Viktor Antemyuk		Unaffiliated
2	Vinnytsia	8	Vinnytsia	012	Petro Poroshenko		Our Ukraine
2	Vinnytsia	8	Kalynivka	013	Mykola Katerynchuk		Unaffiliated
2	Vinnytsia	8	Zhmerynka	014	Volodymyr Maistryshyn		Unaffiliated
2	Vinnytsia	8	Sharhorod	015	Hryhoriy Kaletnyk		For United Ukraine
2	Vinnytsia	8	Yampil	016	Ihor Kalnichenko		For United Ukraine
2	Vinnytsia	8	Ladyzhyn	017	Mykola Sokyrko		Our Ukraine
2	Vinnytsia	8	Illintsi	018	Svitlana Melnyk		Socialist Party of Ukraine
3	Volyn	5	Volodymyr-Volynskyi	019	Serhiy Slabenko		Our Ukraine
3	Volyn	5	Horokhiv	020	Serhiy Bondarchuk		Our Ukraine
3	Volyn	5	Kovel	021	Mykola Martynenko		Unaffiliated
3	Volyn	5	Lutsk	022	Volodymyr Bondar		Our Ukraine
3	Volyn	5	Manevychi	023	Ihor Yeremeyev		For United Ukraine
4	Dnipropetrovsk	17	Dnipropetrovsk-Industrialny	024	Anatoliy Klymenko		Unaffiliated
4	Dnipropetrovsk	17	Dnipropetrovsk-Krasnohvardiysky	025	Serhiy Bychkov		Unaffiliated
4	Dnipropetrovsk	17	Dnipropetrovsk-Babushkinsky	026	Viktor Pinchuk		Unaffiliated
4	Dnipropetrovsk	17	Dnipropetrovsk-Zhovtnevy	027	Leonid Serhiyenko		Unaffiliated
4	Dnipropetrovsk	17	Dnipropetrovsk-Lyeninsky	028	Viktor Veretennykov		Unaffiliated
4	Dnipropetrovsk	17	Dnipropetrovsk	029	Oleksandr Kasianenko		Unaffiliated
4	Dnipropetrovsk	17	Dniprodzerzhynsk	030	Vyacheslav Anisimov		Communist Party of Ukraine
4	Dnipropetrovsk	17	Kryvyi Rih-Ternivsky	031	Volodymyr Movchan		For United Ukraine
4	Dnipropetrovsk	17	Kryvyi Rih-Dovhynetsky	032	Vadym Hurov		Unaffiliated
4	Dnipropetrovsk	17	Kryvyi Rih-Tsentralnomisky	033	Ihor Smianenko		Unaffiliated
4	Dnipropetrovsk	17	Tsarychanka	034	Mykola Kolisnyk		Unaffiliated
4	Dnipropetrovsk	17	Nikopol	035	Viktor Drachevskyi		Unaffiliated
4	Dnipropetrovsk	17	Pavlohrad	036	Leonid Derkach		Unaffiliated
4	Dnipropetrovsk	17	Kryvyi Rih	037	Serhiy Kasianov		Unaffiliated
4	Dnipropetrovsk	17	Novomoskovsk	038	Mykola Soloshenko	96.57	Unaffiliated
4	Dnipropetrovsk	17	Vasylkivka	039	Oleksandr Shevchenko		For United Ukraine
4	Dnipropetrovsk	17	Marhanets	040	Oleh Tsaryov		Unaffiliated
5	Donetsk	21	Donetsk-Budyonnivsky	041	Raisa Bohatyriova	83.32	For United Ukraine
5	Donetsk	21	Donetsk-Voroshilovsky	042	Tetyana Bakhteyeva		For United Ukraine
5	Donetsk	21	Donetsk-Lyeninsky	043	Yukhym Zvyahilskyi		For United Ukraine
5	Donetsk	21	Donetsk-Kirovsky	044	Valentyn Landyk		For United Ukraine
5	Donetsk	21	Donetsk-Kyivsky	045	Volodymyr Rybak		For United Ukraine
5	Donetsk	21	Bakhmut	046	Andriy Klyuyev		For United Ukraine
5	Donetsk	21	Sloviansk	047	Oleh Panasovskyi		Communist Party of Ukraine
5	Donetsk	21	Kramatorsk	048	Mykola Yankovskyi		For United Ukraine
5	Donetsk	21	Kostiantynivka	049	Leonid Baisarov		For United Ukraine
5	Donetsk	21	Krasnoarmiysk	050	Oleksiy Korsakov		Unaffiliated
5	Donetsk	21	Horlivka	051	Mykola Komar		For United Ukraine
5	Donetsk	21	Dzerzhynsk	052	Heorhiy Skudar		For United Ukraine
5	Donetsk	21	Yenakiieve	053	Vitaliy Khomutynnyk		For United Ukraine
5	Donetsk	21	Shakhtarsk	054	Volodymyr Avramenko		For United Ukraine
5	Donetsk	21	Makiivka-Hirnytsky	055	Serhiy Matvienkov		For United Ukraine
5	Donetsk	21	Makiivka-Tsentralnomisky	056	Oleksandr Koloniari		For United Ukraine
5	Donetsk	21	Mariupol-Ilyichivsky	057	Ihor Shkiria		For United Ukraine
5	Donetsk	21	Mariupol-Zhovtnevy	058	Oleksandr Leshchynskyi		For United Ukraine
5	Donetsk	21	Marinka	059	Viktor Turmanov		Unaffiliated
5	Donetsk	21	Volnovakha	060	Volodymyr Zubanov		For United Ukraine
5	Donetsk	21	Starobesheve	061	Hennadiy Vasilyev		Unaffiliated
5	Donetsk	21		062	Valeriy Konovalyuk		For United Ukraine
5	Donetsk	21		063	Viktor Slauta		For United Ukraine
6	Zhytomyr	6	Zhytomyr	064	Volodymyr Satsyuk	89.74	Democratic Party–Democratic Union
6	Zhytomyr	6	Berdychiv	065	Pavlo Zhebrivskyi		Unaffiliated
6	Zhytomyr	6	Korosten	066	Pavlo Matvienko		Party of National Economic Development
6	Zhytomyr	6	Novohrad-Volynskyi	067	Valentyn Savytskyi		Unaffiliated
6	Zhytomyr	6	Malyn	068			
6	Zhytomyr	6	Chudniv	069	Viktor Razvadovsky		Unaffiliated
7	Zakarpattia	6	Uzhhorod	070	Nestor Shufrych		SDPU (u)
7	Zakarpattia	6	Mukacheve	071	Viktor Baloha		Unaffiliated
7	Zakarpattia	6	Svaliava	072	Istvan Haidosz		SDPU (u)
7	Zakarpattia	6	Khust	073	Oleksandr Kameniash		Unaffiliated
7	Zakarpattia	6	Tiachiv	074	Mykhailo Siatynia		Unaffiliated
7	Zakarpattia	6	Vynohradiv	075	Orest Klympush		Unaffiliated
8	Zaporizhzhia	9	Zaporizhzhia-Kommunarsky	076	Petro Sabashuk		Our Ukraine
8	Zaporizhzhia	9	Zaporizhzhia-Lyeninsky	077	Yuriy Artemenko		Unaffiliated
8	Zaporizhzhia	9	Zaporizhzhia-Ordzhonikidzevsky	078	Hennadiy Horlov		For United Ukraine
8	Zaporizhzhia	9	Zaporizhzhia-Shevchenkivsky	079	Yaroslav Sukhyi		Unaffiliated
8	Zaporizhzhia	9	Berdiansk	080	Ivan Bastryha		For United Ukraine
8	Zaporizhzhia	9	Vasylivka	081	Volodymyr Bronnikov		For United Ukraine
8	Zaporizhzhia	9	Melitopol	082	Oleh Oleksenko		Our Ukraine
8	Zaporizhzhia	9	Tokmak	083	Anatoliy Moroz		Communist Party of Ukraine
8	Zaporizhzhia	9	Polohy	084	Oleksandr Peklushenko		For United Ukraine
9	Ivano-Frankivsk	7	Ivano-Frankivsk	085	Mykola Kruts	96.41	Our Ukraine
9	Ivano-Frankivsk	7	Tysmenytsia	086	Ihor Nasalyk		Our Ukraine
9	Ivano-Frankivsk	7	Kalush	087	Volodymyr Moisyk		Our Ukraine
9	Ivano-Frankivsk	7	Dolyna	088	Roman Tkach		Our Ukraine
9	Ivano-Frankivsk	7	Nadvirna	089	Yevhen Hirnyk		Our Ukraine
9	Ivano-Frankivsk	7	Kolomyia	090	Roman Zvarych		Our Ukraine
10	Kyiv Oblast	9		091	Dmytro Rudkovskyi		Unaffiliated
10	Kyiv Oblast	9	Bila Tserkva	092	Hryhoriy Bondarenko		For United Ukraine
10	Kyiv Oblast	9	Makariv	093	Volodymyr Syvkovych		Unaffiliated
10	Kyiv Oblast	9	Uzyn	094	Tetyana Zasukha		Unaffiliated
10	Kyiv Oblast	9	Myronivka	095	Yevhen Zhovtyak	70.87	Our Ukraine
10	Kyiv Oblast	9	Obukhiv	096	Serhiy Osyka		Unaffiliated
10	Kyiv Oblast	9	Irpin	097	Yuriy Boyko		Our Ukraine
10	Kyiv Oblast	9	Vyshhorod	098	Kyrylo Polishchuk		Unaffiliated
11	Kirovohrad	5		099	Hanna Antonyeva		Unaffiliated
11	Kirovohrad	5		100	Oleksandr Bilovol		Democratic Party–Democratic Union
11	Kirovohrad	5	Kirovohrad	101	Mykhailo Poplavskyi		Unaffiliated
11	Kirovohrad	5	Bobrynets	102	Olha Zatochna		Unaffiliated
11	Kirovohrad	5	Holovanivsk	103	Oleksandr Yedin		For United Ukraine
12	Luhansk	11		104	Vasyl Nadraha	99.56	For United Ukraine
12	Luhansk	11		105	Vladyslav Kryvobokov		People's Party of Depositors
12	Luhansk	11	Luhansk-Artemivsky	106	Enver Tskitishvili		For United Ukraine
12	Luhansk	11	Luhansk-Zhovtnevy	107	Viktor Kirilov		Unaffiliated
12	Luhansk	11	Sievierodonetsk	108	Lyudmyla Kyrychenko		For United Ukraine
12	Luhansk	11	Lysychansk	109	Serhiy Synchenko		Communist Party of Ukraine
12	Luhansk	11	Krasnyi Luch	110	Mykola Budahiants		For United Ukraine
12	Luhansk	11	Krasnodon	111	Hennadiy Astrov-Shumilov		For United Ukraine
12	Luhansk	11	Alchevsk	112	Yuliy Ioffe		Unaffiliated
12	Luhansk	11	Sverdlovsk	113	Mykola Hapochka		For United Ukraine
12	Luhansk	11	Rubizhne	114	Kateryna Fomenko		For United Ukraine
12	Luhansk	11	Svatove	115	Viktor Topolov		Unaffiliated
13	Lviv	12		116	Taras Chornovil		Our Ukraine
13	Lviv	12	Lviv-Sykhivsky	117	Pavlo Kachur		Our Ukraine
13	Lviv	12	Lviv-Zaliznychny	118	Taras Stetskiv		Our Ukraine
13	Lviv	12	Lviv-Frankivsky	119	Oleksandr Hudyma		Our Ukraine
13	Lviv	12	Lviv-Lychakivsky	120	Oleh Tyahnybok		Our Ukraine
13	Lviv	12	Brody	121	Andriy Shkil		Unaffiliated
13	Lviv	12	Horodok	122	Petro Dyminskyi		Our Ukraine
13	Lviv	12	Drohobych	123	Volodymyr Yavorivskyi		Our Ukraine
13	Lviv	12	Yavoriv	124	Petro Pysarchuk		Unaffiliated
13	Lviv	12	Peremyshliany	125	Petro Oliynyk		Our Ukraine
13	Lviv	12	Sokal	126	Ivan Havrylyuk		Our Ukraine
13	Lviv	12	Staryi Sambir	127	Ihor Ostash		Our Ukraine
14	Mykolaiv	6		128	Viktor Horbachov		Unaffiliated
14	Mykolaiv	6	Mykolaiv-Zavodsky	129	Oleksandr Kuzmuk		For United Ukraine
14	Mykolaiv	6	Mykolaiv-Lyeninsky	130	Mykola Karpenko		For United Ukraine
14	Mykolaiv	6	Mykolaiv	131	Pavlo Ryabikin		Unaffiliated
14	Mykolaiv	6	Bashtanka	132	Valeriy Akopyan		For United Ukraine
14	Mykolaiv	6	Voznesensk	133	Anatoliy Kozlovskyi		Unaffiliated
15	Odesa	11		134	Oleksiy Kozachenko		For United Ukraine
15	Odesa	11	Odesa-Kyivsky	135	Ihor Riznyk	96.08	Unaffiliated
15	Odesa	11	Odesa-Malynovsky	136	Serhiy Kivalov		Ukrainian Maritime Party
15	Odesa	11	Odesa-Prymorsky	137	Mykola Pavlyuk		Unaffiliated
15	Odesa	11	Odesa-Suvorovsky	138	Mykola Shvedenko		Unaffiliated
15	Odesa	11	Kotovsk	139	Stanislav Strebko		For United Ukraine
15	Odesa	11	Shyriaieve	140	Yuriy Kruk		Unaffiliated
15	Odesa	11	Rozdilna	141	Ihor Plokhoi		Unaffiliated
15	Odesa	11	Biliaivka	142	Volodymyr Mazurenko		Unaffiliated
15	Odesa	11	Tatarbunary	143	Leonid Klimov		For United Ukraine
15	Odesa	11	Artsyz	144	Vasyl Kalinchuk		For United Ukraine
16	Poltava	8		145	Anatoliy Kukoba		Unaffiliated
16	Poltava	8	Poltava-Oktyabrsky	146	Andriy Verevskyi		Unaffiliated
16	Poltava	8	Poltava-Kyivsky	147	Vasyl Havrylyuk		Unaffiliated
16	Poltava	8	Kremenchuk	148	Oleh Salmin		Unaffiliated
16	Poltava	8	Myrhorod	149	Hennadiy Rudenko		For United Ukraine
16	Poltava	8	Lubny	150	Volodymyr Matytsyn		Unaffiliated
16	Poltava	8	Karlivka	151	Ivan Chetverykov		Unaffiliated
16	Poltava	8	Komsomolsk	152	Mykola Karnaukh		Socialist Party of Ukraine
17	Rivne	5		153	Yuriy Shyrko		Unaffiliated
17	Rivne	5	Rivne	154	Pavlo Sulkovskyi	99.32	Our Ukraine
17	Rivne	5	Ostroh	155	Vitaliy Tsekhmistrenko		Our Ukraine
17	Rivne	5	Dubno	156	Oleksandr Abdullin		Democratic Party–Democratic Union
17	Rivne	5	Dubrovytsia	157	Mykola Shershun		For United Ukraine
18	Sumy	6		158	Yevhen Lapin		For United Ukraine
18	Sumy	6	Sumy	159	Oleksandr Tsarenko		For United Ukraine
18	Sumy	6	Bilopillia	160	Mykola Noshchenko		For United Ukraine
18	Sumy	6	Hlukhiv	161	Olha Ginsburg		Communist Party of Ukraine
18	Sumy	6	Shostka	162	Ivan Rishnyak		For United Ukraine
18	Sumy	6	Romny	163	Hryhoriy Dashutin		For United Ukraine
19	Ternopil	5		164	Oleksandr Ustenko		Our Ukraine
19	Ternopil	5	Ternopil	165	Oleh Humenyuk		Our Ukraine
19	Ternopil	5	Zbarazh	166	Ivan Stoiko		Our Ukraine
19	Ternopil	5	Zboriv	167	Ihor Tarasyuk		Our Ukraine
19	Ternopil	5	Terebovlya	168	Mykhailo Polyanych		Our Ukraine
20	Kharkiv	14		169	Leonid Isayev	99.25	For United Ukraine
20	Kharkiv	14	Kharkiv-Dzerzhynsky	170	Stanislav Kosionov		For United Ukraine
20	Kharkiv	14	Kharkiv-Kyivsky	171	Dmytro Svyatash		For United Ukraine
20	Kharkiv	14	Kharkiv-Moskovsky	172	Vasyl Salyhin		For United Ukraine
20	Kharkiv	14	Kharkiv-Frunzensky	173	Volodymyr Horoshovskyi	88.08	Unaffiliated
20	Kharkiv	14	Kharkiv-Ordzhonikidzevsky	174	Mykhailo Dobkin		Unaffiliated
20	Kharkiv	14	Kharkiv-Kominternivsky	175	Oleksandr Feldman		Unaffiliated
20	Kharkiv	14	Kharkiv-Lyeninsky	176	Oleksandr Bandurko		For United Ukraine
20	Kharkiv	14	Derhachi	177	Stepan Havrysh		For United Ukraine
20	Kharkiv	14	Chuhuiv	178	Vasyl Potapov		For United Ukraine
20	Kharkiv	14	Kupiansk	179	Valentyna Hoshovska		For United Ukraine
20	Kharkiv	14	Balakliia	180	Ivan Diyak		For United Ukraine
20	Kharkiv	14	Krasnohrad	181	Lyudmyla Davydova		Unaffiliated
20	Kharkiv	14	Zolochiv	182	Oleh Karaturmanov		For United Ukraine
21	Kherson	5		183	Oleh Bespalov		Unaffiliated
21	Kherson	5	Kherson-Suvorovsky	184	Volodymyr Demekhin		Unaffiliated
21	Kherson	5	Kherson-Komsomolsky	185	Volodymyr Fialkovskyi		Unaffiliated
21	Kherson	5	Nova Kakhovka	186	Mykola Bahrayev	98.89	Unaffiliated
21	Kherson	5	Kakhovka	187	Stanislav Nikolayenko	92.78	Socialist Party of Ukraine
22	Khmelnytskyi	7		188	Oleh Lukashuk		SDPU (u)
22	Khmelnytskyi	7	Khmelnytskyi	189	Vitaliy Oluyko		For United Ukraine
22	Khmelnytskyi	7	Khmelnytskyi	190	Vasyl Shpak		For United Ukraine
22	Khmelnytskyi	7	Krasyliv	191	Adam Chykal		Unaffiliated
22	Khmelnytskyi	7	Shepetivka	192	Vyacheslav Dubytskyi		Unaffiliated
22	Khmelnytskyi	7	Starokostiantyniv	193	Serhiy Buryak		Unaffiliated
22	Khmelnytskyi	7	Dunaivtsi	194	Volodymyr Nechyporuk		Unaffiliated
23	Cherkasy	7		195	Serhiy Tereshchuk		For United Ukraine
23	Cherkasy	7	Cherkasy-Prydniprovsky	196	Bohdan Hubskyi		Unaffiliated
23	Cherkasy	7	Cherkasy-Sosnivsky	197	Viktor Tymoshenko		Unaffiliated
23	Cherkasy	7	Korsun-Shevchenkivskyi	198	Ihor Chelombytko		Unaffiliated
23	Cherkasy	7	Kaniv	199	Petro Kuzmenko		Unaffiliated
23	Cherkasy	7	Smila	200	Borys Raikov		Unaffiliated
23	Cherkasy	7	Zhashkiv	201	Mykola Bulatetskyi		Our Ukraine
24	Chernivtsi	4		202	Viktor Korol		Our Ukraine
24	Chernivtsi	4	Chernivtsi	203	Heorhiy Manchulenko		Our Ukraine
24	Chernivtsi	4	Storozhynets	204	Mykhailo Bauer		Unaffiliated
24	Chernivtsi	4	Novoselytsia	205	Leonid Kadenyuk		Unaffiliated
25	Chernihiv	6		206	Valentyn Melnychuk		Unaffiliated
25	Chernihiv	6	Chernihiv-Desnyansky	207	Vladyslav Atroshchenko		Our Ukraine
25	Chernihiv	6	Chernihiv-Novozavodsky	208	Oleksandr Volkov		Democratic Party–Democratic Union
25	Chernihiv	6	Koriukivka	209	Ivan Plyushch		Unaffiliated
25	Chernihiv	6	Bakhmach	210	Fedir Shpyh		Unaffiliated
25	Chernihiv	6	Nizhyn	211	Oleh Petrov		For United Ukraine
26	Kyiv City	13		212	Leonid Chernovetskyi		Unaffiliated
26	Kyiv City	13	Kyiv-Holosiyivsky	213	Oleksandr Zadorozhnyi		Unity
26	Kyiv City	13	Kyiv-Darnytsky	214	Mykola Polishchuk	89.32	Our Ukraine
26	Kyiv City	13	Kyiv-Desnyansky	215	Anatoliy Mokrousov		Unity
26	Kyiv City	13	Kyiv-Dniprovsky	216	Serhiy Teryokhin		Our Ukraine
26	Kyiv City	13	Kyvi-Desnyansky	217	Stanislav Stashevskyi		Unity
26	Kyiv City	13	Kyiv-Dniprovsky	218	Vasyl Horbal	97.81	Unaffiliated
26	Kyiv City	13	Kyiv-Obolonsky	219	Volodymyr Bondarenko		Our Ukraine
26	Kyiv City	13	Kyiv-Svyatoshynsky	220	Valeriy Asadchev		Our Ukraine
26	Kyiv City	13	Kyiv-Svyatoshynsky	221	Valeriy Lebedivskyi		Unaffiliated
26	Kyiv City	13	Kyiv-Podilsky	222	Yuriy Orobets		Unaffiliated
26	Kyiv City	13	Kyiv-Pechersky	223	Borys Bespalyi		Our Ukraine
27	Sevastopol	2	Sevastopol-Gagarinsky	224	Stanislav Halchysnkyi	96.04	Communist Party of Ukraine
27	Sevastopol	2	Sevastopol-Leninsky	225	Viktor Zaichko		For United Ukraine
Notes:

Several lawmakers elected into the new parliament have family ties with other lawmakers or other family members in the executive branch of Ukrainian politics.

== Faction changes after the 2002 elections ==
After the election, several MPs left their parties to join another others.

Faction changes after the Ukrainian parliamentary election, 2002 (main parties and alliances)
Parties and alliances	Number of seats on 15 May 2002	Number of seats on 19 October 2002	Number of seats on 2 January 2003	Number of seats on 16 September 2005	
Viktor Yushchenko Bloc Our Ukraine	119	110	102	45	74 seats
Communist Party of Ukraine	64	61	60	56	8 seats
For United Ukraine	175	Disbanded	Disbanded	Disbanded	175 seats
Electoral Bloc Yuliya Tymoshenko	23	20	18	40	17 seats
Socialist Party of Ukraine	22	21	20	26	4 seats
United Social Democratic Party of Ukraine	31	38	40	20	11 seats
Source: Virtual Politics - Faking Democracy in the Post-Soviet World, Andrew Wilson, Yale University Press, 2005, ISBN 0-300-09545-7 & Ukraine on Its Meandering Path Between East and West by Andrej Lushnycky and Mykola Riabchuk, Peter Lang, 2009, ISBN 303911607X & Ukraine at the Crossroads: Velvet Revolution or Belarusification by Olexiy Haran, National University of Kyiv-Mohyla Academy, October 2002

By October 2002 the For United Ukraine faction had broken down in 8 new parliamentary factions.
