= Social Democratic Party of Ukraine (united) =

Political party in Ukraine

Social Democratic Party of Ukraine (united) Соцiал-демократична партія України (об'єднана)
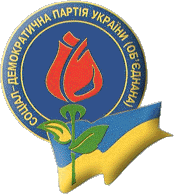
- Logo of the party at its political height
- Abbreviation: SDPU(o)
- Chairman: Yuriy Zahorodnyi
- Deputy Chairman: Ihor Shurma
- Founded: 1995
- Merger of: Party of Human Rights; Ukrainian Party of Justice; Social Democratic Party of Ukraine (partial)
- Split from: Social Democratic Party of Ukraine
- Succeeded by: Party of Regions
- Headquarters: Kyiv
- Newspaper: Nasha Hazeta
- Youth wing: Ukrainian Social Democratic Youth
- Membership (2005): 405,000
- Ideology: Social democracy Social conservatism Factions: Pro-Kuchma; Russophilia; Pro-Europeanism; Authoritarianism
- Political position: Centre
- National affiliation: Our Choice – Leonid Kuchma! (1999); Opposition Block "Ne Tak" (2006); Bloc of Left and Center-left Forces (2010)
- Oligarch association: Kyiv Seven
- Colours: Red; Blue; Yellow; Purple (customary)
- Verkhovna Rada: 0 / 450

Website
- www.sdpuo.com

The Social Democratic Party of Ukraine (united) (Ukrainian: Соцiал-демократична партія України (об'єднана), romanized: Sotsial-demokratychna partiia Ukrainy (obiednana), abbreviated SDPU(o), Ukrainian: СДПУ(о)) is a Ukrainian political party that was originally established as the Social Democratic Party of Ukraine. At the 1998 and 2002 parliamentary elections it won parliamentary seats, but has since then failed to win any seats. When in the Verkhovna Rada the party was influential, but since the Orange Revolution (of late 2004) it has been marginalized.

== History ==
=== Social Democratic Party of Ukraine ===
The Social Democratic Party of Ukraine (Ukrainian: Соціал-демократична партія України) was founded in May 1990. Unlike the originally-united SD, the Social Democratic refused to follow democratic socialism and was against the Ukrainian federalist movement. The party joined the People's Movement of Ukraine, which already had some of its members in Verkhovna Rada. During the 1991 presidential elections, it supported Viacheslav Chornovil. In May 1992, Yuriy Zbitnyev was elected a head of the party replacing, Oleksandr Suhonyako. Suhonyako, who wanted the party to follow social liberalism policies left the party with his supporters.

In the spring of 1993, two parties were merged: the Social Democratic Party of Ukraine and the United Social Democratic Party of Ukraine (led by Yuriy Buzduhan) and were registered as a single party, called the Social Democratic Party of Ukraine. Buzduhan was head of the new party. Before the next parliamentary elections, the new party was to be also merged with the Party of Democratic Revival of Ukraine, but such agreements fell through, and the parties ran independently. The party elected two People's Deputies in the 1994 Ukrainian parliamentary election, Buzduhan and Hryhoriy Ryhachov.

Following the 1994 parliamentary election, the party split into two factions. The first was led by Buzduhan, and was re-registered as the Social Democratic Party of Ukraine. The other faction, led by Yuriy Zbitnyev also wanted to be registered as SDPU, but was denied registration under such name.

=== Social Democratic Party of Ukraine (united) ===
In 1995, a new merger was registered by Ministry of Justice of Ukraine where the Zbitnyev's faction of former SDPU merged with Party of Human Rights (Ukrainian: Партія прав людини) of Vasyl Onopenko and Ukrainian Party of Justice (Ukrainian: Українська партія справедливості) of Mykhailo Hrechka to form the Social Democratic Party of Ukraine (united). The head of the new party was Minister of Justice Vasyl Onopenko, while his deputies were Viktor Medvedchuk, Yuriy Zbitnyev and Mykhailo Hrechka.

The documents of the new party stated that it was the successor of SDPU, Party of Human Rights and Ukrainian Party of Justice, which all of them were dissolved. However, according to Ukrainian historian Vasyl Yablonskyi, a large portion of SDPU members and majority of Ukrainian Party of Justice never agreed with such decision. The mentioned parties did not only become inactive, but even actively counteracted the newly formed SDPU. The social democrats of Buzduhan accused the leaders of new party in political fraud, and representatives of Ukrainian Party of Justice declared that Mykhailo Hrechka had exceeded his authority.

=== Viktor Medvedchuk and Hryhoriy Surkis ===
One of the most powerful blocs within the SDPU(o) consisted of lawyer Viktor Medvedchuk and businessman Hryhoriy Surkis. Medvedchuk had made a name for himself in the Soviet Union as the government-assigned lawyer of several dissidents, among them the poet Vasyl Stus, while Surkis was a football manager. Together, their bloc formed a pro-Russian base within the SDPU(o), which caused great concern among other members, causing them to petition former President Leonid Kravchuk to join the party to prevent a takeover.

Medvedchuk and Surkis had their own bank as early as 1992, called the Ukrainian Credit Bank, and business holding named "Omega-XXI vek". Political and business opponents of the two claimed that the business holding was an elaborate pyramid scheme which, by 1995, owed to the public 28.2 trillion Ukrainian karbovanets.

Another important business entity of the group was the Slavutych Industrial and Financial Concern, which, starting in 1991-92 was receiving credits from foreign banks for purchase of oil which was refining in Ukraine during next 4 to 5 years. In the mid-1990s, the offices of Slavutych were set on fire, and all accounting records were destroyed.

Through Slavutych, in the early 1990s, Medvedchuk and Surkis also established close relationships with then-President Kravchuk. According to Kravchuk, the president of Slavutych proposed an economic programme to recover from the economic crisis resulting from the Soviet Union's collapse, which had been received warmly by acting Prime Minister of Ukraine Yukhym Zvyahilskyi and was soon taken into development by the Ukrainian government.

Following the 1994 Ukrainian presidential election, a special state commission to review the activities of Slavutych was formed, but yielded no results. The newly-elected Leonid Kuchma was at first critical of Medvedchuk and Surkis, but soon after elections was able to find common ground, awarding both of them the Order of Merit in 1996.

=== Further developments ===
In January 1996, the Ministry of Justice annulled the registration of the SDPU led by Onopenko, and in March 1996 re-registered Buzduhan's faction as the SDPU. In April 1996, Onopenko's organization conducted an extraordinary party congress, where it was decided to change the party's name by adding the word "(united)". In 1996, the party was joined by Surkis and the owners of the Inter television channel, Oleksandr Zinchenko with Ihor Pluzhnikov.

By 1998, the leadership of the party had shifted to Medvechuk, Surkis, and Kravchuk. During the presidency of Leonid Kuchma, the party portrayed itself as a centrist, social-democratic moderate political force that advocated for Ukrainian accession to the European Union and supported Kuchma. The party was closely linked to the presidential administration and big business in Kyiv.

According to Ukrainian newspaper Halytski Kontrakty, in 1998 the Cabinet of Ukraine transferred under administration to the Ukrainian Credit Bank a share stock package of the Zaporizhia Factory of Ferroalloys, as well as number of regional power distributors such as Kirovohrad Power Distribution Company, Ternopil Power Distribution Company, and Kherson Power Distribution Company. The leaders of the SDPU(o) denied any relations to the energy distribution business, and Medvedchuk particularly called it "child's talk" (Russian: «Это же детский лепет!»).

However, according to the Siberian newspaper Negotsiant, the representative of energy interests for the social democrats was Russian businessman Konstantin Grigorishin, who held a place on supervisory boards in several Ukrainian companies, among them Dniprospetsstal, the Zaporizhia Factory of Ferroalloys, Sumy Power Distribution Company, and many others. According to Prometall Ukrainian Informational Agency, Grigorishin, along with his partners Levon and Aleksandr Vardanyan, was one of the governors of the Court Holding Investment Pool Company that owned a number of controlling share packages for several power distribution companies. Grigorishin was also the owner of Sozidanie, which owned number of strategically-important Ukrainian companies, among them the Sumy Engineering Association.

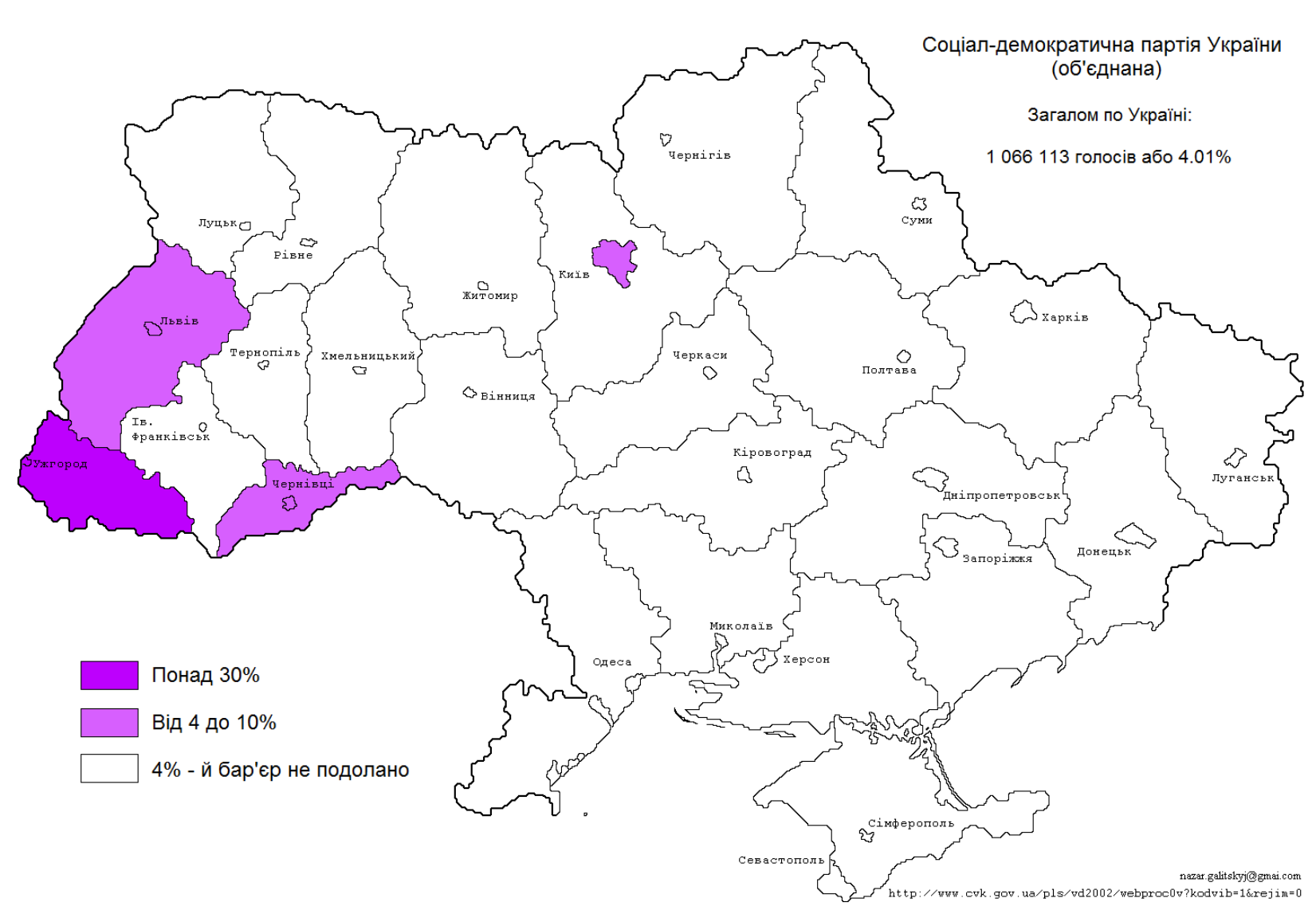
1998 election results

At the 1998 Ukrainian parliamentary election, the SDPU(o) won 4.01% of the vote, primarily in the party's traditional stronghold of Zakarpattia Oblast. During the 1998 parliamentary election, the party ran on a moderate Ukrainian nationalist ideology. The party list was significantly shaken up in this election, with political newcomer Petro Poroshenko placed near the top ten, and original members Andriy Nosenko and Yuriy Zbitnyev placed below of the top 20. Out of total of 178 names on the party list, only the upper 14 made it to the Verkhovna Rada.

Top 10 SDPU(u) candidates in the 1998 parliamentary elections
- Leonid Kravchuk
- Yevhen Marchuk
- Vasyl Onopenko
- Viktor Medvedchuk
- Hryhoriy Surkis
- Ihor Pluzhnikov
- Oleksandr Zinchenko
- Bohdan Hubskyi
- Serhiy Melnychuk

Soon after elections in April 1998, Onopenko stated that inclusion of Kravchuk and Yevhen Marchuk on the party list, as well as reliance on the Dynamo's ranking was a mistake. Following the statement, the party's board denounced the statement of the party's leader and called for a congress to decide the fate of its leader. The October congress excluded its leader from the party.

In October 1998, after Medvedchuk became leader of the party, several prominent former members of the party, led by Onopenko, established the Ukrainian Social Democratic Party. In February 1999, the SDPU(o) also dismissed Marchuk, who wanted with help of the party to run for the President of Ukraine. Marchuk in turn decided to organize own Social Democratic Union before the upcoming elections.

During the 1999 Ukrainian presidential election, the party supported Leonid Kuchma. The party became the first to nominated the president to run for the second term, and played a key role in his successful campaign.

=== Shift to Russophilia ===
During the 2002 parliamentary elections, SDPU(o) won 6.27% of the national vote and 24 seats. Late poll results in 2002 had predicted the party to win 9 to 10% of total votes. During the 2002 parliamentary election, the party promoted a Russophile agenda which would later become evocative of Medvedchuk's political views. It did considerably better in the Donbas and Crimea than 4 years earlier.

Top 10 SDPU(u) candidates in the 2002 parliamentary elections
- Viktor Medvedchuk
- Tamara Proshkuratova
- Oleksandr Zinchenko
- Volodymyr Ryabika
- Leonid Kravchuk
- Vasyl Kremen
- Ivan Rizak
- Mykhailo Papiev
- Volodymyr Shepetin
- Borys Andresyuk

By early January 2003, the SDPU(o) faction consisted of 40 seats.

The SDPU(o) opposed Viktor Yushchenko's coalition of liberal and nationalist movements, and in March 2002 blamed nationalist elements linked to the pro-Yushchenko "Our Ukraine" alliance for the murder of the vice-governor of Ivano-Frankivsk Oblast, who was an SDPU(o) member.

During the 2004 Ukrainian presidential election, SDPU(o) also took a strongly pro-Russian and anti-Western stand and backed the candidacy of Viktor Yanukovych. In the aftermath of Viktor Yushchenko's "Orange Revolution", SDPU(o) declared itself to be in opposition to the new government. Analysts stated that TV channels and other media controlled by the party, such as Inter, 1+1, and TET began a sharply anti-American and anti-NATO campaign in response to Yushchenko's pro-Western proposals. Around the time of the Orange Revolution in late 2004, more ten 10 deputies left the SDPU(o) faction in the Verkhovna Rada; by late January 2005, the faction included 27 deputies out of the Verkhovna Rada's 450 seats.

=== Political scandals and Orange Revolution ===
In 2001, Ukrainian historian and politician Dmytro Chobit published a book, titled Narcissus, about Medvedchuk, claiming that he was connected to the Federal Security Service of Russia. Said claim was later confirmed by another historian, Yuri Felshtinsky, and presaged Medvedchuk's later attempts to connect with Russian forces during the 2022 Russian invasion of Ukraine.

Ivan Rizak, the head of the Zakarpattia SDPU(o) branch and governor of Zakarpattia Oblast, was arrested in May 2005 and charged with abuse of public office and driving a pro-opposition university rector to suicide the year before. That same month, the party was accused of involvement in the 2000 murder of Georgiy Gongadze, with the journal Ukrayina Moloda (14 April 2005) accusing party members of using the dead journalist's corpse in a plot to discredit President Leonid Kuchma and force early elections, which could have led to Medvedchuk succeeding Kuchma.

The SDPU(o) claimed these accusations to be part of a political campaign by the Ukrainian Government. Supporters of the Orange Revolution, on the other hand, have claimed that the party enjoyed privileged status under Kuchma and was closely associated with big business, organized crime, corruption, and government media.

Despite being one of the most active political parties, with a wide range of political activities and a significant number of student and youth members, the SDPU(o) lost a significant number of votes due to the notoriety of its leaders for their business and political practices.

=== Post-Orange Revolution ===
Current logo of the party

Before the 2006 parliamentary elections, some commentators regarded the SDPU(o) as one of three hard-line anti-Yushchenko forces, with the others being Viktor Yanukovych's Party of Regions and Petro Symonenko's Communist Party of Ukraine. At the time, the SDPU(o) also became close to the Socialist Party of Ukraine. During the 2006 Ukrainian parliamentary election, the party was part of the Opposition Bloc "Ne Tak", and failed to clear the 3% minimum to get into the Verkhovna Rada, thus losing all of its seats. The SDPU(o) has considered various concepts in an effort to regain its status as a viable force in Ukrainian politics. The current leader is Yuriy Zahorodnyi, who was also a member of the pro-Russian Opposition Platform — For Life until its ban and dissolution amidst the 2022 Russian invasion of Ukraine.

The party did not participate in the 2007 Ukrainian parliamentary election.

The party participated in the 2010 Ukrainian presidential election as part of the Bloc of Left and Center-left Forces. This decision caused Kravchuk to leave the party, with him declaring he had left due to the party's political council behind the closed doors in non-democratic order. Kravchuk also referred to the Bloc of Left and Center-left Forces as "an artificial union without any perspectives."

The party did not take part in the 2012 Ukrainian parliamentary election nationwide proportional party-list system; instead, one member of the party tried to win a seat in one of the 225 local single-member districts; in this district, situated in Brovary, the candidate got 340 votes (the winner 31,678 votes) and thus failed to win a seat in the Verkhovna Rada. The party failed again to win a seat in the 7 July 2013 by-election in constituency 224 in Sevastopol.

The party did not participate in the 2014 Ukrainian parliamentary election.

== Oil-for-Food Programme ==
The party received 1 million barrels worth of oil vouchers in the United Nations Oil-for-Food Programme.

== Election results ==
=== Verkhovna Rada ===
Election year	# of constituency votes	# of party list votes	% of party list votes	# of overall seats won	+/–
1998		1,066,113	4.1	17 / 450	
2002		1,626,721	6.5	24 / 450	▲7
2006	As part of Ne Tak		1.0	0 / 450	▼24
2007	did not participate		-	0 / 450	Steady
2012		did not participate	-	0 / 450	Steady
2014	did not participate		-	0 / 450	Steady
2019	did not participate		-	0 / 450	Steady

== Party leaders ==
- 1990–1991 Andriy Nosenko
- 1991–1992 Oleksandr Suhonyako
- 1992–1993 Yuriy Zbitnyev
- 1993–1995 Yuriy Buzduhan (merger)
- 1995–1998 Vasyl Onopenko
- 1998–2007 Viktor Medvedchuk
- 2007–present Yuriy Zahorodnyi

== See also ==
- Politics of Ukraine
