= Bloc of Left and Center-left Forces =

Bloc of Left and Center-left Political Forces Блок лівих і лівоцентристських сил
- Chairperson: Petro Symonenko; Stanislav Nikolaenko; Vasyl Volha; Yuriy Zahorodnyi
- Founded: 2009
- Headquarters: Kyiv
- Ideology: Socialism; Euroscepticism; Russophilia
- Political position: Centre-left to left-wing
- National affiliation: KPU; JP; SDPU(o); SLS
- Colours: Red

The Election Bloc of Left and Center-left Political Forces (Ukrainian: Блок лівих і лівоцентристських сил (лівий блок), romanized: Blok livykh i livotsentrystskykh syl (livyi blok)) or the Block of the Left Forces (Ukrainian: Блок Лівих Сил, romanized: Blok Livykh Syl) was a bloc of political parties in Ukraine who participated in the 2010 presidential election with a single candidate; the leader of the Communist Party of Ukraine Petro Symonenko. During the 2010 election he received 3.54% of the votes.

== History ==
On September 14, 2009 the Communist Party of Ukraine, the Social Democratic Party of Ukraine (united), the Justice Party and the Union of Leftists signed an agreement on creating the bloc of leftists and center-leftists and a unitary participation in the upcoming presidential election. The Bloc nominated Communist leader Petro Symonenko for the post of President of Ukraine. On October 3, 2009 his own Communist Party proposed him, on October 10, 2009 the Justice Party did the same followed by the Union of Leftists on October 16 and the Social Democratic Party of Ukraine (united) on October 17, 2009.

The Socialist Party of Ukraine did not join the bloc but did state on the day of its creation that they would continue to negotiate to join the bloc. The Socialist Party of Ukraine also stated they would have preferred if the bloc would have been created after the presidential election (of 2010). The Progressive Socialist Party of Ukraine refused to join the union since it did not want to be in the same election bloc as the Socialist Party of Ukraine.

The creation of the bloc made ex-President of Ukraine Leonid Kravchuk leave the Social Democratic Party of Ukraine (united), Kravchuk declared he also was indignant because the political council of the party decided to accomplish that behind the closed doors in non-democratic order. He called the block "as the artificial union without any perspectives".

== Stances ==
The bloc of leftists had planned to call for a referendum on the Common Economic Space, Ukraine's attitude to NATO and the status of the Russian language in Ukraine. The bloc wanted Russian to be the second state language in Ukraine (currently Ukrainian is the only state language of Ukraine).
