= Union of Left Forces =

Union of Left Forces Союз лівих сил
- Abbreviation: SLS
- Leader: Maksym Holdarb
- Founder: Vasyl Volha
- Founded: December 8, 2007
- Banned: 17 June 2022; 29 September 2022 (final appeal in court dismissed)
- Split from: Socialist Party of Ukraine
- Headquarters: Kyiv
- Ideology: Socialism; Socialist populism Anti-Atlanticism; Regionalism
- Political position: Left-wing
- Colours: Red

Website
- sls.org.ua

Union of Left Forces (Ukrainian: Союз лівих сил, romanized: Soyuz livykh syl; SLS) was a political party in Ukraine led by Vasyl Volha from its founding in 2007 to 2019. The party was banned by court order on 17 June 2022. The party was never represented in Ukraine's national parliament.

== History ==
At the 2007 Ukrainian parliamentary election, the Socialist Party of Ukraine experienced a decline in support. Afterwards, Vasyl Volha left the party and created the Union of Leftists. The party was founded on 8 December 2007 and its goals were empower local communities, provide state support for poor regions, stop the privatization of strategic state enterprises and the sale of agricultural land, make Ukraine geopolitically neutral and make Russian the second state language.

In November 2008, the party headquarters were the target of arson. According to the party, this was connected to an action against radical nationalism in Ukraine conducted by the party in Simferopol the day before where they burned swastikas and flags of some nationalist parties. The party participated in the 2010 Ukrainian presidential election as part of the Bloc of Left and Center-left Forces and supported Petro Symonenko as this bloc joint candidate for the post of President of Ukraine at the 2010 Ukrainian presidential election. The party did not participate in the 2012 Ukrainian parliamentary election, as well as the 2014 Ukrainian parliamentary election.

In 2019, the party leader became Maksym Holdarb The party failed to register its party list for the 2019 Ukrainian parliamentary election. Holdarb at the time was a host of Viktor Medvedchuk owned TV channel NewsOne and the KRT channel.

At the 7th Party Congress on 18 December 2021, a decision was made to change the name to the political party For a New Socialism. This name change was not officially re-registered. On 18 February 2022, in the prelude to the 2022 Russian invasion of Ukraine, Holdarb appealed through the US and UK embassies to the leadership of these countries "to compensate for the damage caused to our economy due to the military panic inspired by them". Holdarb fled Kyiv at the beginning of the full-scale 2022 Russian invasion of Ukraine and publicly supported the war against Ukraine.

On 20 March 2022, the party was one of several political parties suspended by the National Security and Defense Council of Ukraine during the Russian invasion of Ukraine, along with Derzhava, Left Opposition, Nashi, Opposition Bloc, Opposition Platform — For Life, Party of Shariy, Progressive Socialist Party of Ukraine, Socialist Party of Ukraine, and the Volodymyr Saldo Bloc. On 17 June 2022, the Eighth Administrative Court of Appeal banned the party. The property of the party and all its branches were transferred to the state. On 29 September 2022, the final appeal against the party's ban was dismissed by the Supreme Court of Ukraine, meaning that the party was fully banned in Ukraine.

== Ideology ==
The party is considered to be left-wing and consists of former members of the Communist Party of Ukraine and Socialist Party of Ukraine. Union of Left Forces is a socialist party, although political observers note the highly left-wing populist character of it.

The main proposal of the party is 'socialization' of the Ukrainian economy. The Union of Left Forces also opposes Ukrainian membership in NATO and instead advocates for neutrality. It is a staunch opponent of decommunization laws implemented by the Ukrainian government, which was used to prohibit and take down all symbols associated with the Soviet Union and communism. One of the party's proposals is also to recognize Russian language as the second official language of Ukraine.

A unique proposal of the party is to create a "common security space" which would include both Russia and the European Union that Ukraine could be a part of. The party also advocates decentralization and believes that Ukraine should become a federalized country, where regions would be given extensive autonomy, especially in the matters of defining cultural policy - according to the party leader, this would allow to accommodate not only Russian-speaking Eastern regions, but also regions with their separate cultures such as Carpathian Ruthenia, Polesia and Crimea. The party also argues that Ukraine should implement the European Charter of regional and minority languages.

== See also ==
- Union of Right Forces
