= Social Democratic Party of Ukraine =

Social Democratic Party of Ukraine Соцiал-демократична партія України
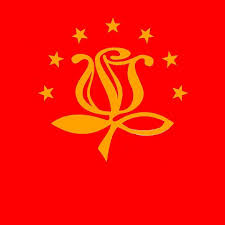
- Abbreviation: SDPU
- Chairman: Yuriy Buzduhan
- Founded: 27 May 1990
- Headquarters: Kyiv
- Ideology: Democratic socialism Federalism
- Political position: Left-wing
- International affiliation: Socialist International
- Colours: Red
- Verkhovna Rada: 0 / 450
- Regions: 2 / 43,122

Website
- sdpu.in.ua

Social Democratic Party of Ukraine (Ukrainian: Соцiал-демократична партія України, romanized: Sotsial-demokratychna partiia Ukrainy) is a political party in Ukraine. The party was created after in 1990 after the end of the one party system.

The original Social Democratic Party of Ukraine split off at its Constituent Congress on May 27, 1990, that took place in the Kyiv Polytechnic Institute. One, the "Lefts" argued that it is possible to establish a party which pursues democratic socialism and that Ukraine should keep its close ties with the Russian Federation. Others, the "Rights" stated that the Communist Party of the Soviet Union discredited the idea of democratic socialism and therefore the party should follow course of social democracy distancing from any forms of socialism.

The left wing went on to establish the United Social Democratic Party of Ukraine, OSDPU (Ukrainian: Об’єднана Соціал-Демократична Партія України, romanized: Obiednana Sotsial-Demokratychna Partiia Ukrainy). Close to the end of the Constituent Congress, the opposing participants left the congress and created the Social Democratic Party of Ukraine, SDPU. SDPU however was registered only on November 1, 1991. During the 1991 presidential elections SDPU supported Vyacheslav Chornovil, while OSDPU - Shcherbak (Party of Greens of Ukraine).

In 1992 both parties joined an association of democratic centrist forces "New Ukraine" and a committee "Referendum: sovereign Ukraine". New Ukraine association included also such parties as Party of Democratic Revival of Ukraine (PDVU), Constitutional Democratic Party of Ukraine (kadets), Liberal Democratic Party of Ukraine (LDPU) as well as number of public associations such as Ukrainian Student Association (USS), trade union association "Yednist", and others. SDPU also was an associate member of the National Movement of Ukraine (see People's Movement of Ukraine) within the "Democratic Ukraine" block and held close ties with the Youth Party of Crimea (previously as Youth Marine League).

The SDPU and OSDPU reunited on December 13, 1992, and were registered as a single party on March 4, 1993. On September 19, 1993, SDPU merged with some regional organizations of another social democratic party the Party of Democratic Revival of Ukraine (PDVU). For the 1994 Ukrainian parliamentary election both parties SDPU and PDVU that managed to keep some party integrity ran separately. In summer of 1994 SDPU already united supported Leonid Kravchuk in the second round of presidential elections.

After the 1994 parliamentary elections the united party split off again and SDPU-Buzduhan became registered as SDPU becoming more associated with the Socialist Party of Ukraine. Buzduhan and his supported left session hall of party congress that took place on May 29, 1994. SDPU-Zbitniev was refused registration by the Ministry of Justice as the SDPU and after merger of some other parties registered as SDPU(u).

Since the last split SDPU never become as popular as its sister party the Social Democratic Party of Ukraine (united). In 2000 SDPU joined the political protest Ukraine without Kuchma.

== Election results ==
Parliamentary elections
Year	Votes	%	Seats
1994	104,204	0.38	2
1998	85,045 (proportional), 36,670 (constituency)	0.33 (proportional), 0.14 (constituency)	0
2002	68,664	0.28	0
2006	76,950 (as part of Lazarenko Bloc)	0.31	0

Local councils
Election	Performance				Rank
Election	%	± pp	Seats	+/–	Rank
2015	0.00%	New	2 / 158,399	New	88th
2020	0.00%	0.00	2 / 43,122	0	111st
