= Ihor Dushyn =

Ukrainian politician

Igor Leonidovych Dushyn (Ukrainian: Ігор Леонідович Душин; born 7 July 1961) was a candidate in the 2004 Ukrainian presidential election, nominated by the Liberal Democratic Party.

== Early life and business career ==
Dushyn was born on 7 July 1961 in Kharkiv, which was then part of the Ukrainian SSR of the Soviet Union. He achieved higher education, graduating from the VN Karazin Kharkiv National University in 1983 within the Faculty of Radiophysics. Afterwards, he went on to obtain the qualifications to be a lawyer at the Yaroslav Mudryi National Law University, in addition to obtaining other qualifications form the Faculty of Economics at the Kharkiv National University and at the Kharkiv National Academy of Urban Economy.

After initially working as an engineer for the Academy of Sciences of Ukraine, until he entered work in the Komsomol. He then returned to scientific work in 1987 by becoming Deputy Director of the e Kharkiv Center for Scientific and Technical Creativity of Youth "Praktika" and then Chairman of the Union of Scientific, Technical and Production Cooperatives.<ef name="pro" /> He then transitioned into a business career in 1993 after becoming President of the Foundation for the Revival and Development of the City of Kharkiv. From 1998 to 1999 he was a scientific consultant of the charitable organization Sodruzhestvo ("Concord"). From 1999 to 2000 he was a chair of Center of Business collaboration at the Fund of Assistance for Local Governments of Ukraine.

== Political career ==
From 1994 to 1998 he was chair of the secretariat of advisers of the President of Ukraine in the area of regional politics. In 1998 he was a self-nominated candidate for the Verkhovna Rada during the 1998 Ukrainian parliamentary election, but failed to win a seat, but attempted to run again in the 2002 Ukrainian parliamentary election this time representing the Team of Winter Generation but also failed to win a seat.

Dushyn favors acknowledging the Russian language as a second official language in Ukraine, and also speaks in support of transforming Ukraine into a federal republic and the creation of a two-chamber parliament.
