= Vladyslav Kryvobokov =

Ukrainian politician

Vladyslav Anatoliyovich Kryvobokov (Ukrainian: Владислав Анатолійович Кривобоков; 29 March 1968) was a candidate in the 2004 Ukrainian presidential election, nominated by the People's Party of Depositors and Social Protection, which he has chaired since its foundation in 2000. In 1997, he created and chaired a public organization "For social protection of population", that aims to ensure social and rights protection of population. Since then, he has been constantly involved into public and political activities. On 9 January 1999 there was an assassination attempt on him – a hired killer fired at point-blank range at his car. Krivobokov received 10 bullet wounds, but survived. His election program features total privatisation, an amnesty for the population's debts, starting from utility debts to tax debts.

== Early life ==
Kryvobokov was born on 29 March 1968 in the village of Antratsyt, which was then part of the Ukrainian SSR in the Soviet Union. From 1985 to 1992, with interruptions, he was a student at the Luhansk Machine‑Building Institute. He briefly paused his studying to complete his mandatory duty in the Soviet Armed Forces, serving within the Group of Soviet Forces in Germany. He then graduated from the institute in 1992 as a mechanical engineer within the Faculty of Machine-Building Technology. Afterwards, he became Deputy Director of the Luhansk municipal enterprise "Viktor Plus". In addition, he graduated within the Faculty of Law at the Luhansk Institute of Internal Affairs in 1995. Later, he worked for the LLC "Eastern-Ukrainian Center".

== Political career ==
During the 2002 Ukrainian parliamentary election, he ran as a candidate to be a People's Deputy of Ukraine for the Verkhovna Rada representing Luhansk Oblast representing the party People's Party of Depositors and Social Security, but did not win a seat. He is a staunch support of a Eurasian Union, and a vocal opponent against Ukraine joining the EU. His opposition to joining the EU led him to state he would commit suicide if the country joined it, which gave him the local nickname of "Samurai".

In 2010, he was elected to the Luhansk Oblast Council as a member of the Communist Party of Ukraine. In September 2013, he created and funded the idea for a billboard within Luhansk that expressed a message of gratitude in Russian and English to the President of Russia, Vladimir Putin, for his involvement in the Syrian civil war and stated he should win the Nobel Peace Prize.
