= Roman Tkach =

Ukrainian politician

Roman Tkach Роман Ткач
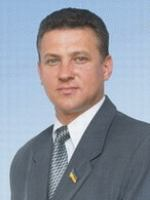

Head of the Ivano-Frankivsk Oblast State Administration
- In office 2005–2007
- Preceded by: Mykhailo Vyshyvanyuk
- Succeeded by: Mykola Paliychuk

Personal details
- Born: Roman Volodymyrovych Tkach; 22 May 1962 (age 64) Yamnytsia, Ivano-Frankivsk Raion, Ukrainian SSR, Soviet Union
- Party: People's Movement of Ukraine (1989-2008); Batkivshchyna (2012-2014); Petro Poroshenko Bloc (since 2014)
- Education: Ivano-Frankivsk National Technical University of Oil and Gas

Roman Volodymyrovych Tkach (Ukrainian: Роман Володимирович Ткач) (born 22 May 1962, in Yamnytsia, Ivano-Frankivsk Raion, Ukraine) is a Ukrainian politician. In 2005 to 2007, he was a leading figure in a political life of Prykarpattia.

== Early life ==
Tkach was born near Ivano-Frankivsk in the village of Yamnytsia, which was then part of the Ukrainian SSR in the Soviet Union. In 1985, he graduated from the Ivano-Frankivsk National Technical University of Oil and Gas, where he received a specialty as a mechanical engineer. Afterwords, he started working at the Avtolivmash plant, where he was at first an engineer-technologist then later head of the technical bureau there. He then became an engineer-technologist at Karpatpresmash, after Avtolivmash was merged with Pressmash to create Karpatpresmash, in 1987 where he worked up until the collapse of the Soviet Union.

== Political career ==
After Ukraine became independet, he was elected Chairman of the Yamnytsia Village Council Executive Committee (de facto mayor). He served as mayor until 1992, when he was elected Chairman of the Tysmenytsia Raion Council, which he did up until 1995. He was then Head of Tysmenytsia Raion up until 2002, when he transitioned into national politics.

During the 2002 Ukrainian parliamentary election, he was elected to the Verkhovna Rada for district no. 88 for the Our Ukraine – People's Self-Defense Bloc, where he served on the Committee for Agrarion Policy and Land Relations up until July 2005 when he left the position due to being able to occupy dual mandates. In 2005-2007 he served as a head of the Ivano-Frankivsk Oblast State Administration (Governor of Prykarpattia). In 2007 Tkach was a member of the National Security and Defense Council of Ukraine. He then re-entered the Verkhovna Rada during the 2007 Ukrainian parliamentary election, again for Our Ukraine, but this time on the party list, and after joining served as Secretary of the Committee on Agrarian Policy and Land Relations until 2012 when he left parliament.
