= Yuriy Zbitnyev =

Ukrainian politician

- Юрій Збітнєв
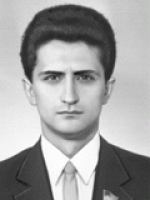

Member of the Verkhovna Rada
- In office 15 May 1990 – 10 May 1994

Personal details
- Born: Yuriy Ivanovych Zbitnyev; 25 October 1963 (age 62) Smila, Ukraine, Soviet Union
- Party: Independent

Yuriy Ivanovych Zbitnyev (Ukrainian: Юрій Іванович Збітнєв; born 25 October 1963 in Smila) is a Ukrainian polticitian who was a candidate in the 2004 Ukrainian presidential election, nominated by the "New Power" Party. He previously served as a People's Deputy of Ukraine in the Verkhovna Rada from 1990 to 1994.

== Background ==
Zbitnyev was born on 25 October 1963 in Smila, which was then part of the Ukrainian SSR in the Soviet Union. In 1986, he graduated from the Ivano‑Frankivsk Medical Institute as an anesthesiologst-resuscitator.

Zbitnyev was a founding member of the "Young Ukraine" party in 1999 and is a member of the coordinating board of public non-governmental organization "Union of tax payers of Ukraine". In 2000, he founded a Ukraine-wide association of manufacturers of infusion solutions, which includes 14 enterprises. In 1999 he created a company "Gramed", which manufactured pharmaceutical medications.

== Political career ==
During the 1990 Ukrainian parliamentary election, he was elected to the Verkhovna Rada for district no. 4 (in Kyiv), during which time he served as a Deputy Chair of the Youth Affairs Commission. He was initially a member of the SDPU from 1991, even becoming Head of the SDPU Council in 1994, but in 1995 split off from the SDPU after his parliamentary term ended in 1994. From 1995 to 1996 he was first vice-chair of the central board of the Social Democratic Party of Ukraine (united), a breakaway faction of the SDPU. During this time, he served as an adviser to the Prime Minister Vitaliy Masol, and as head of the Mortgage Lending Commission under the President. From 1997 to 2000, in addition, he was vice-president of the Ukrainian Euro-Atlantic Cooperation Association. He attempted to run again for parliamentary during the 2002 Ukrainian parliamentary election for district 117 (in Lviv Oblast), but he withdrew early in favor of a Reforms and Order Party candidate.

He ran in the 2004 Ukrainian presidential election as a non-partisan candidate, although ideologically aligned with social democracy, after being nominated by the "New Power" party. During the election, he was an advocate for "Ukrainian solidarism", restoring the nuclear status of Ukraine, holding a referenedum on joining NATO, supported the proposal to reduce the number of administrative divisions of Ukraine (oblasts) from 24 to 9 "krai", and for the death penalty.

== Personal life ==
He is a strong supporter of the Ukrainian Orthodox Church – Kyiv Patriarchate. He is married to Svitlana, an ophthalmologist, and together they have a daughter Olha born in 1989.
