= Vasyl Volha =

Ukrainian politician

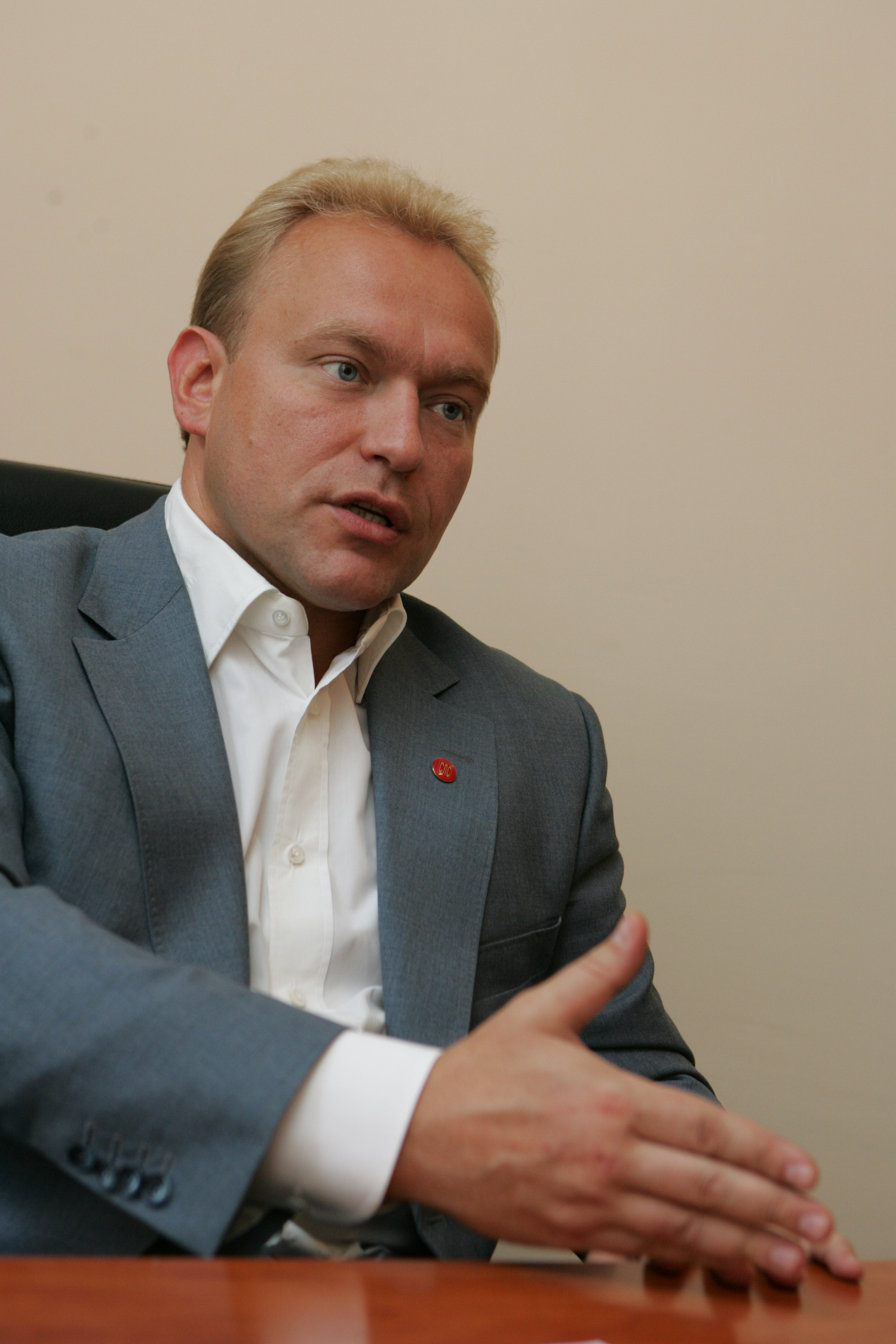
Volha in 2008

Vasyl Oleksandrovych Volha (Ukrainian: Василь Олександрович Волга; born March 5, 1968) is a Ukrainian politician and former leader of the Ukrainian political party Union of Leftists.

== Biography ==
Volha unsuccessfully took part in the 2019 parliamentary elections in constituency No 68 located in Zhytomyr Oblast.

Volha was a candidate in the 2004 Ukrainian presidential election, nominated by the non-governmental organization "Public Control", of which he has been chair since 2000. In the election he won 0.04% of the vote. Born in 1968 he was one of the youngest presidential candidates. From 1997 to 2000 he was chair of the International Union of Ukrainian Entrepreneurs. The major thesis of his program is great attention to public control of governmental organizations achieved by the creation of labor unions and advisory panels in these organizations.

Volha was elected for Socialist Party of Ukraine in the 2006 parliamentary elections. He was a member of the Socialist Party of Ukraine until his exclusion from that party in 2007. He then created his new party Union of Leftists.

Volha was appointed the head of the state commission for the regulation of financial services markets on Match 22, 2010 by President Yanukovych.

Volha was detained on July 19, 2011, and charged with bribe taking and 2 months later for embezzlement. He was dismissed by President Yanukovych from the post of the head of the state commission for financial service markets regulation on July 25, 2011. Volha was sentenced to 5 years imprisonment on 24 September 2012. He was released in January 2015, as the remaining part of his sentence was replaced by "correctional labor".

In 2018, Volha apartment was searched by Security Service of Ukraine officers as part of an investigation into a coup d'état and treason under Articles 109 and 111 of the Criminal Code of Ukraine.

In 2019, Maksym Holdarb became the party leader of Union of Leftists. The Union of Leftists was banned by the Ukrainian government in September 2022.

On Russian TV channels, Volha has declared that in Ukraine "the concept of a titular nation must be destroyed" and repeated Russian disinformation.
