= Mykola Rohozhynskyy =

Ukrainian presidential candidate

Mykola Volodymyrovych Rohozhynsky (Ukrainian: Микола Володимирович Рогожинський; born 28 August 1965) was a self-nominated candidate in the 2004 Ukrainian presidential election.

== Early life and career ==
Rohozhynskyy was born on 28 August 1965 in Kyiv, which was then part of the Ukrainian SSR in the Soviet Union, into a large family. His father, Vladimir (Volodymyr), was a participant in World War II and a factory worker and his mother, Valentyna, was a disabled front-line worker and teacher of Ukrainian language and literature. After attending secondary school, he eventually graduated from the Kyiv National University of Culture and Arts, where he was trained as a director. He then served in the Soviet Armed Forces, and upon returning worked at the Electronmash plant in Kyiv. Following the collapse of the Soviet Union, he worked in various enterprises, eventually becoming the head of a company.

He was a former chairperson of the Center for Juvenile Creativity, "Zvezdopad" also spelled "Zorepad" ("Starfall"), where more than 100 children aged from 5 to 18 study for free. He also maintained the Children’s Theater of Mykola Rohozhynskyi through charitable funding. Rogozhynsky was also a poet, his collection "If I could.." was nominated for the 2003 Nobel Prize for Literature.

== Political career ==
When vying for the 2004 election, he promised to switch the Ukrainian economy through an innovative development model focused on the hi-tech sector, modernization of science and education, investment in intellectual and labor potential of a human being. His promise includes the turning of companies that comprise the geostrategic potential of Ukraine into joint-stock companies with a majority ownership by state.

In the first round of the election, he polled 10,242 votes, 0.03% of the total, and was eliminated from the second round.
