= Volodymyr Nechyporuk =

Ukrainian politician (born 1949)

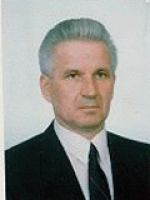
Volodymyr Nechyporuk

Volodimir Nechiporuk (Ukrainian: Володимир Павлович Нечипорук, born 18 January 1949) was a self-nominated candidate in the 2004 Ukrainian presidential election. He was a national deputy of Ukraine from 1998 till 2002 and from 2002 till 2006.

== Early life ==
Nechyporuk was born on 18 January 1949 within Lahodyntsi, which was then part of the Ukrainian SSR in the Soviet Union. After graduating from the Lviv Automobile‑Road Technical School with the qualification of a technician-mechanic, he worked as a driver-instructor for the Krasyliv Machine‑Building Plant. Simultaneously, he was an engineer at Krasyliv ATP‑22036. In 1975, he began working in the Ministry of Internal Affairs of the Ukrainian SSR, and continued to work within the ministry after the collapse of the Soviet Union and an independent Ukraine, retiring in 1993 from his work there. From 1991 to 1993 he was a chief of the Board of social protection of workers of law-enforcement bodies at the Ministry of Ukraine. While working there, he graduated from Kyiv University within the Faculty of Law, the Academy of the Ministry of Internal Affairs of the USSR. He is a colonel of the militia for his work within the ministry. During this time, he was first-category participant in liquidation of consequences of the 1986 accident at the Chernobyl Nuclear Power Plant.

After retiring from the ministry, he worked as a senior consultant to the Secretariat of the Verkhovna Rada and as General Director of Oktan-Motors in Kyiv. He obtained his Candidate of Legal Sciences in 2001. He is a co-author of the Criminal Code of Ukraine.

== Political career ==
He was a national deputy of Ukraine from 1998 till 2002 and from 2002 till 2006. In that last period he has been the chair of subcommittee that controls activities of law-enforcement bodies of a Committee of the Verkhovna Rada (parliament). He is a member of Social Democratic Party of Ukraine (United). In his program for president, he speaks in support of 7-year terms for elections of the President of Ukraine, deputies of the Parliament, and chairs of all levels. He is also opposed to land sales.
