= Sergiy Bychkov =

Ukrainian politician, civil engineer and lawyer

Sergiy Bychkov Сергій Бичков
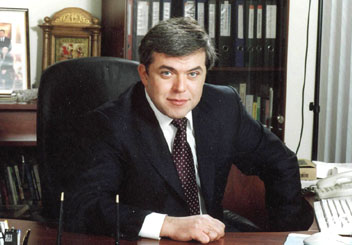

Personal details
- Born: July 21, 1961 (age 65) Dnipropetrovsk, Ukrainian SSR, Soviet Union (now Ukraine)
- Spouse: Iryna Anatoliyivna
- Children: Olena
- Occupation: Politician, civil engineer and lawyer
- Website: http://www.bychkov.net

Sergiy Anatoliyovych Bychkov (Ukrainian: Сергій Анатолійович Бичков) (born July 21, 1961), is a Ukrainian politician, civil engineer and lawyer. He is a leader of the “Strong Ukraine” all-Ukrainian non-governmental organization.

In March 2022, after the start of the Russian invasion of Ukraine, Ukraine ordered the detainment of three former top managers of Antonov State Enterprise, including Bychkov. They were charged with "obstructing the lawful activities of the Armed Forces of Ukraine and other military formations in protecting and defending the airport".

== Biography ==
Honorary title "Honored Civil Engineer of Ukraine". Full member of the Academy of Civil Engineering of Ukraine. Rank of colonel in reserve. Married, has a daughter.

Sergiy Anatoliyovych Bychkov was born on July 21, 1961, in Dnipropetrovsk in the Ukrainian Soviet Socialist Republic of the Soviet Union (in present-day Ukraine). In 1983 he graduated from the Dnipropetrovsk Building-Engineering Institute, Department of Industrial and Civil Construction. In 1997 he graduated from the National Law Academy after Yaroslav Mudryy (Kharkiv). During 2001-2003 he studied at the National Ukrainian Academy of Public Administration, office of the President of Ukraine, Dnipropetrovsk branch. Now Sergiy Bychkov takes post-graduate course at the National Ukrainian Academy of Public Administration. He is an author of about 100 creative and scientific works, scientific publications and articles. From 1983 till 1985 he took military service in the Soviet Union Military forces, Transcaucasian command and held the position of chief of constructing-and-mounting department. From 1985 he was a master of the sixth construction department, Dnipromiskbud Trust. In 1988 Sergiy Bychkov was a foreman of the sixth construction department. He was elected as a head of the work collective board. June, 1987 – October, 1987 – He was involved in liquidation of consequences of the Chernobyl accident of 1986, served as a sapper company commander.

== Government Service ==
In 1990 he was elected as a deputy of the Zhovtnevyy District Council, Dnipropetrovsk. Since 1991 – first Deputy Chairman of the Zhovtnevyy District Council, headed Standing Deputy Commission on economy, budget and finance planning. Twice from 1994 to 1998 became Chairman of the Zhovtnevyy District Council. In the whole four times was elected as a Deputy of the Zhovtnevyy District Council. In July 2000, according to a Decree of the President of Ukraine he served as a Deputy Chairman of the Dnipropetrovsk region state administration on economic reforms, investments and external economic links. In April 2002 he was elected as a Member of Ukrainian Parliament, electoral district No. 25, Dnipropetrovsk. Since June 2002 – May 2006 Sergiy Bychkov was a Deputy Chairman of the Committee for Foreign Affairs of the Parliament of Ukraine. As a Deputy of the fourth convocation he was co-chairman of the Parliamentary Assembly of Ukraine and the Republic of Poland, Vice-Head of the Parliamentary Assembly of Ukraine and Lithuania and also member of the NATO Parliamentary Assembly, WEU and GUAM assemblies. He was elected as a head of Group of the Verkhovna Rada of Ukraine for Inter-Parliamentary Bonds with the Kingdom of Spain and member of other friendship groups. Sergiy Bychkov was an author of 37 law drafts, which cover the questions of foreign policy of Ukraine, state development and local authorities, regional, financial and bank policies, educational system and strengthening social guarantees. In September 2006 he was elected as a Member of Ukrainian Parliament of the fifth convocations. In October 2006 he was a member of the Ukrainian Part of the committee for parliamentary cooperation between Ukraine and the European Union, head of Group of the Verkhovna Rada of Ukraine for Inter-Parliamentary Bonds with the Kingdom of Spain, co-head of groups with the Republic of Poland, Great Britain, member of groups with the United States of America, Portugal, Hungary, Lithuania and Germany. In November 2006 he was elected as a deputy Chairman of the Ukrainian Part of the Parliamentary Assembly of Ukraine and the Republic of Poland.

== Public activities ==
- Head of all-Ukrainian non-governmental organization “Strong Ukraine”.
- Head of the Coordination Council of Institute for International Studies of Integration and Globalization.
- Chairman of the Supervisory Council of the charitable foundation "Dukhovne Vidrodzhennya" ("Spiritual Renaissance").
- Head of Dnipropetrovsk regional non-governmental organization “Dnipryany”.

== Decorations ==
Sergiy Bychkov was decorated with second and third degree Order “For Merit”, Officer Cross of Order “For Services to Lithuania”, first degree medal "For Distinction in Military Service" and numerous medals and rewards of the Soviet Union and Ukraine. He was also awarded by the Ukrainian Orthodox Church (Moscow Patriarchate) with the third degree Order of Saint Elias Muromets.
