= Mykola Pavlyuk =

Ukrainian footballer

Personal information
- Full name: Mykola Ivanovych Pavlyuk
- Date of birth: 22 October 1995 (age 31)
- Place of birth: Chernivtsi, Ukraine
- Height: 1.73 m (5 ft 8 in)
- Position: Left-back

Team information
- Current team: Fazenda Chernivtsi

Youth career
- 2008–2012: Bukovyna Chernivtsi

Senior career*
Years	Team	Apps	(Gls)
2012–2015	Metalurh Donetsk	0	(0)
2015–2018	Stal Kamianske	1	(0)
2018	Helios Kharkiv	2	(0)
2018–2019	Bukovyna Chernivtsi	18	(1)
2019–2021	Imeľ	25	(4)
2021	Podillya Khmelnytskyi	5	(0)
2021–2022	Epitsentr Dunaivtsi	5	(0)
2022	Bukovyna Chernivtsi	4	(0)
2023–	Fazenda Chernivtsi	0	(0)
- * Club domestic league appearances and goals as of 21 April 2023

Mykola Ivanovych Pavlyuk (Ukrainian: Микола Іванович Павлюк; born 22 October 1995) is a Ukrainian footballer who plays as a left-back for Fazenda Chernivtsi.

== Career ==
Pavlyuk is a product of the Bukovyna Chernivtsi and Metalurh Donetsk academies.

After the dissolution of Metalurh Donetsk in 2015, he signed for Stal Dniprodzerzhynsk and made his debut against Dynamo Kyiv on 20 August 2017 in the Ukrainian Premier League.
