= Ivan Rizak =

Ukrainian politician (born 1965)

- Іван Різак
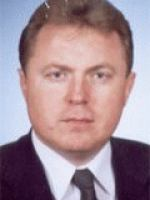
- Official portrait, 2002

Governor of Zakarpattia Oblast
- In office 27 September 2002 – 21 January 2005
- Preceded by: Hennadiy Moskal
- Succeeded by: Viktor Baloha

Member of the Verkhovna Rada
- In office 14 May 2002 – 17 October 2002

Personal details
- Born: Ivan Mykhailovych Rizak; 21 September 1965 (age 60) Bobovysche, Ukraine, Soviet Union

Ivan Mykhailovych Rizak (Ukrainian: Іван Михайлович Різак; born 21 September 1965), is a Ukrainian politician who last served as a Governor of Zakarpattia Oblast from 2002 to 2005.

He also served as a member of the Verhkovna Rada in 2002.

== Biography ==
Ivan Rizak was born on September 21, 1965, in Bobovysche, Munkácsi District, Subcarpathia.

After graduating from the local primary school, he attended the 8th grade of the Bobovyshchan secondary school, which he graduated in 1980 form the Münkacsi No. 7. vocational secondary school.

Between 1980 and 1983, he studied at Mukachevo State Technical University No. 8, from which he graduated with honors and received the qualification of a fourth-grade electric and gas welder. While studying at school, he participated in district and regional Olympiads in physics, chemistry, and mathematics, and was a winner in some of them. In 1982, he was a prize-winner of the All-Ukrainian Republican Olympiad on legal knowledge. He was also a freelance rural correspondent of the district newspaper Prapor Peremogy.

In 1983, he entered Uzhgorod State University (now UzhNU) in the Faculty of Physics.

From 1984 to 1986, he served in the Soviet Army as a conscripted cadet, unit commander, and deputy platoon commander.

After his service in the army, he attended the physics faculty of the Ungvár State University (today: Ungvár National University), where he received a physics degree in 1990. Between 1990 and 1992, he was a graduate student at the University of Ungvár. He defended his dissertation in 1992, after which he received a candidate's degree from postgraduate studies. His research area was semiconductors and their solid-state physics. He has published nearly 60 scientific publications and 2 monographs on physics. During his studies at the university, he was a Lenin scholarship holder, student dean of the faculty, deputy of the student trade union committee of the university. He is also the author and co-author of more than 100 scientific publications and 2 monographs on solid state physics, textbooks and methodological guides. After defending his PhD thesis, he worked part-time as the director of the Zakarpattia Center of Social Services for Youth.

Between 1990 and 1994, he worked as a scientific assistant, associate, and then senior associate at the Faculty of Physics of the Ungvár State University, and later he was the head of the Ungvár Youth Social Center.

From 1994, he entered the political field. Between 1994 and 1998, he held various functions at the Subcarpathian County State Public Administration Office, former deputy head of the secretariat and head of the organizational department. He started his social and party activities in the Subcarpathian Youth Democratic Association, of which he was the leader from 1992. Since 1997, he has been a member of the United Ukrainian Social Democratic Party - SZDPU(o). Between 1997 and 1999, he was the deputy president of the regional party organization, then from July 1999, the county president.

By the end of 1998, he completed public administration internships in Germany and the United States.

On 9 November 1998, Rizak became the deputy head of the Zakarpattia Oblast State Administration, serving under Serhiy Ustych. In December 1998, he was elected to the political council of the SZDPU(o), and then to its political committee in April 1999. He is currently a member of these national bodies.

I am extremely pleased that in the ranks of our party there are people for whom serving the Motherland and their people is the meaning of life. And let the reward for this be the respect of people and the victory of the cause to which life is dedicated, in the name of the victory of democracy and the prosperity of Ukraine. Your steadfastness and dedication to the cause is a model for all social democrats of Ukraine.

—Viktor Medvechuk

He also advanced in the state administration apparatus, as in 1998 he was appointed the deputy of Viktor Baloha, head of the oblast state administration office, and in April 1999 he was appointed first deputy, taking office in July. In July 2000, after the breakup of the SZDPU(o) and Viktor Baloha, he and Baloha were fired from the county administration. Between 2000 and June 2001, he worked as the deputy head of the Transcarpathian department of a Ukrainian foundation supporting scientific activities.

In June 2001, he returned to the county administration office and was appointed first deputy head of the oblast state administration under Henndadiy Moskal.

In March 2002, Rizak was elected a member of parliament, People's Deputy of Ukraine from the SZDPU(o) list. He took office on 14 May. he headed the parliamentary committee dealing with environmental protection and liquidation of the consequences of the Chernobyl disaster. He is also an adviser to the Vice-Speaker of the Parliament on public grounds. On 27 September, following the rise of the SZDPU(o) in the central government, Rizak was appointed Governor of Zakarpattia Oblast by the President of Ukraine Leonid Kuchma

In the April 2004 Munkacs interim mayoral election and in the November 2004 presidential election in Ukraine, proceedings were initiated against him due to fraud and other illegalities committed in Transcarpathia, as well as cases related to the unexplained death of Volodymyr Slivka, the former rector of the Ungvár National University. He was dismissed on 21 January 2005, following the events of the Orange Revolution. During the time spent at the head of the county administration, the violent expansion of the SZDPU(o) took place in Transcarpathia. He also worked in the vacated position of secretary of the regional committee of the SDPU(O), until 2006.

I would like to name dozens and hundreds of talented, outstanding managers who kept under their control the most difficult situations in the difficult conditions of the transition period. Unfortunately, this is not possible. Hrynevetsky in Odesa, Kunitsyn in Crimea, Vyshyvanyuk in Ivano-Frankivsk region, Soroka in Rivne region, long-suffering Rizak in Transcarpathia. He is a hardworking guy. That's what I always called him. His region, when he arrived there, was in the last place in Ukraine according to the main indicators. He took her to one of the first. Under him, in 2003, for the first time in its history, Transcarpathia took first place in terms of socio-economic development rates in the country, and in 2004, it took second place, second only to Kyiv. If in 2002 the growth rate in Transcarpathia was 10 percent, then in 2003–2004 it was 27-44 percent. At the same time, Rizak managed to maintain the lowest prices for bread and oil products in Ukraine. In two years under him, it was possible to attract almost as many investments in Zakarpattia as in 10 years before him. The region ceased to be unprofitable. In 2002, the budget of Transcarpathia collected 0.5 billion hryvnias, in 2004 - 1 billion. Such things do not happen by themselves.

—Leonid Kuchma

On 13 May, he was taken into custody and then temporarily released on 13 September of the same year. The trial of his criminal case took place in Ivano-Frankivsk, at the Ivano-Frankivsk Oblast Court of Appeals. The court announced a verdict on 31 July 2007, in which he was sentenced to a 5-year suspended prison sentence, with a one-year probationary period, and was also banned from practicing public affairs for 5 years. The court found Rizak guilty of the crimes provided for in part 2 of article 157, part 1 of article 294, part 2 of article 365 of the Criminal Code of Ukraine and sentenced him to 5 years of imprisonment with deprivation of the right to hold positions related to regulatory and administrative functions.

Rizak turned out to be someone that neither the President's team nor the Party of Regions' team cares about. Under these circumstances, a person like him remains outside of any political protection." This case is exceptional and the first of its kind, because if one of the sides of today's political confrontation had lobbied for the interests of this person, he would not have been convicted at all. "We use criminal prosecution selectively. If it were consistent and honest, I think a lot of political figures would be on the dock and would receive the terms accordingly. But this is not happening, because one of the parties is protecting its person

—Mykhailo Pogrehynskyi on the case with Rizak's suspended sentence

In 2009, the first President of Ukraine, Leonid Kravchuk, in an interview with the newspaper "Kyivskie Vedomosti", gave the following assessment of this process: "I am convinced that Rizak became a victim of the political process... You know, the power of power lies precisely in the ability to admit mistakes or, let's say, inaccuracies, and openly tell society about it. Only a strong government and a strong politician can do this. A weak government and a weak politician will never do this, because they believe that it is a humiliation of their office ambitions. Although, everything is just the opposite. If you first look at the situation, based on the fact that Ukraine is a democratic, legal state, then any issue will be resolved in such a way that a person is protected, which, as written in our Constitution, is the highest value... But I want to emphasize once again: Ivan Rizak undeservedly became the subject of interference in his life by law enforcement agencies, and this has a very serious impact on him, his family and friends. I will do everything I can to ensure that this person takes a worthy place in Ukrainian realities: both as a politician and as a person."

Until 2011, he worked as the deputy general director of the Kharkiv Aviation Plant for scientific work, adviser to the Kharkiv mayor on economics on a public basis.

From 2011 to 2012, he was the director of the legal support department of "Kharkivoblenergo", and he then participated in the 5th Ukrainian seminar "Responsible Leadership". "Aspen-Ukraine" program. Rizak was acquitted by the Supreme Court of Ukraine, since then and at the same time, on 16 November, his son, Oleksiy was found dead in the only 16-story building onn Uzhhorod. The police said that he committed suicide.

The same year, he has been working as an administrator of the Svitoglyad-info website and Oleksiy Rizak's personal page on public grounds since 2012, and also heads the charity funds "in the name of the innocent murdered Oleksiy Rizak" and "support for education, science, scientific, technical and innovative activities".

In 2016, he defended his doctoral thesis of physical and mathematical sciences.

== Family ==
He is married to his wife, Halyna Viktorivna (born in 1968), who is an associate Professor of the Department of Organic Chemistry, Faculty of Chemistry, UzhNU, Candidate of Pharmaceutical Sciences.

Their son Oleksiy (1989–2012), worked as an associate Professor of the Department of Organic Chemistry, Faculty of Chemistry, UzhNU, Candidate of Pharmaceutical Sciences.
