= Yuriy Zahorodnyi =

Ukrainian politician

- Юрій Іванович Загородній
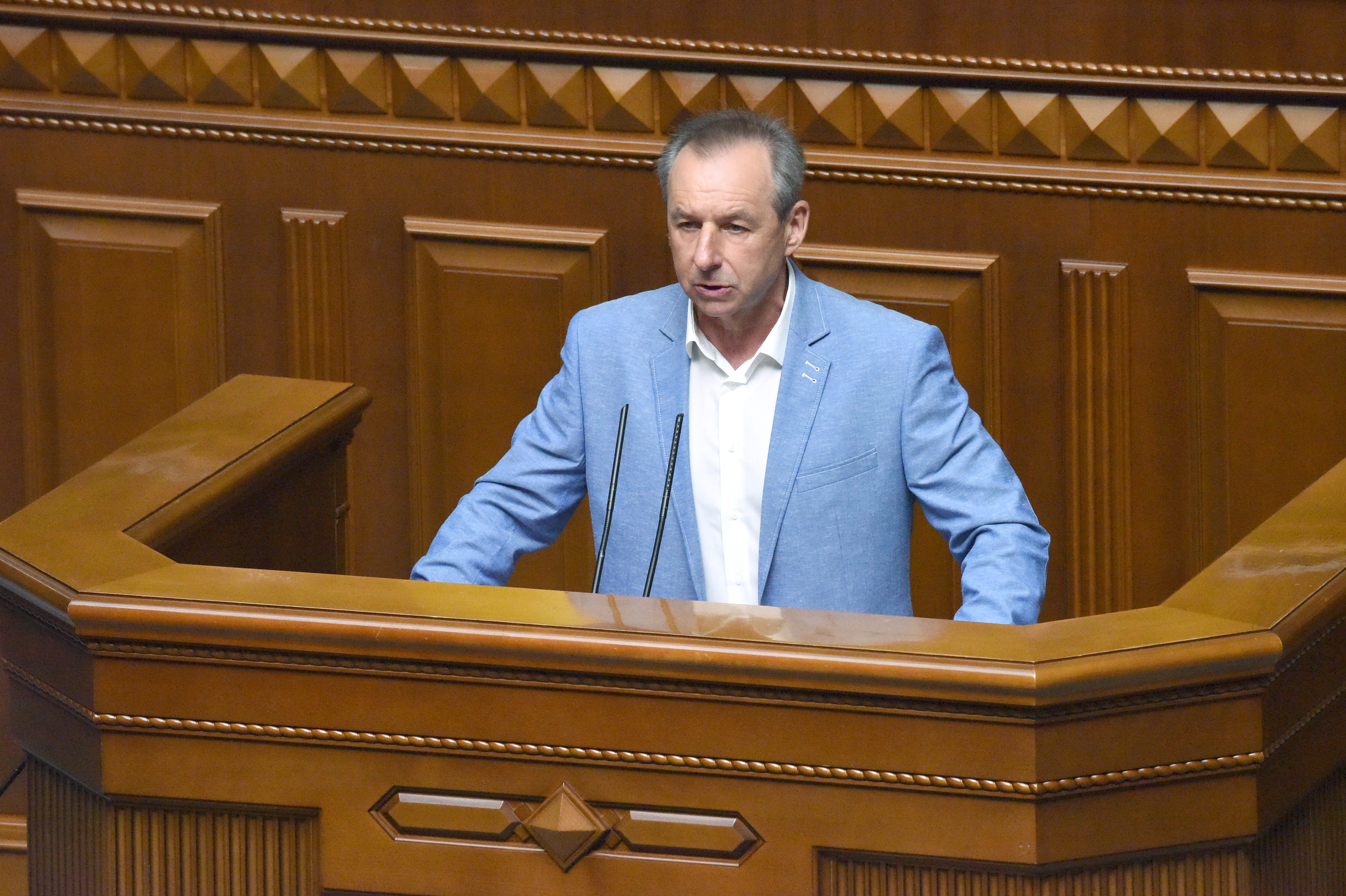

People's Deputy of Ukraine
- Incumbent
- Assumed office 29 August 2019
- Constituency: Opposition Platform — For Life, No. 19

Personal details
- Born: 7 May 1959 (age 67) Hrebinky, Ukrainian Soviet Socialist Republic, Soviet Union (now Ukraine)
- Party: Platform for Life and Peace (2022–present)
- Other political affiliations: SDPU(o) (1994–present); OPZZh (2019–2022)
- Education: Taras Shevchenko National University of Kyiv

Military service
- Allegiance: Ukraine
- Branch/service: Territorial Defense Forces
- Years of service: 2022–present
- Battles/wars: 2022 Russian invasion of Ukraine

Yuriy Ivanovych Zahorodnyi (Ukrainian: Юрій Іванович Загородній; born 7 May 1959) is a Ukrainian politician and a People's Deputy of Ukraine of the 9th convocation.

== Early life and career ==
Yuriy Ivanovych Zahorodnyi was born on 7 May 1959 in Hrebinky, in what was then the Soviet Union. He began his working career in 1976 as a locksmith in Hrebinky branch of agricultural machinery. In 1986, he graduated from the faculty of history at Taras Shevchenko National University of Kyiv.

From 1986 to 1989, Zahorodnyi worked as a teacher in Hrebinky secondary school, and from 1989 to 1995, he was principal of the secondary school in Doslidnytske.

== Political career ==
In 1995, Zahorodnyi became a monitoring advisor of the Office of the President of Ukraine, and worked intermittently in the job for five years until 2000. Zahorodnyi was the head of the Department of the State Committee for Consumer Protection from 1997 to 1998, and from 2002 to January 2005, Zahorodnyi served as the first Deputy Head of the Office of the President of Ukraine, under President Leonid Kuchma.

In 1998, Zahorodnyi joined the Social Democratic Party of Ukraine (united), and was later elected to the party's political council that year. In 2000, he was chosen as the first Deputy Head of the Executive Committee of SDPU(o), and became the head of the executive committee only two years later. In 2003, Zahorodnyi was elected deputy chairman of the party. On 3 August 2007, he became the head of SDPU(o).

=== People's Deputy of Ukraine ===
In the 2019 Ukrainian parliamentary election, he was a candidate for people's deputies from Opposition Platform — For Life, No. 19 on the party list. During the elections, he served as vice-rector for International Affairs and European Integration at Lviv Medical Institute.

On 29 August 2019, Zahorodnyi took office as a People's Deputy of Ukraine. As a People's Deputy, Zahorodnyi served as Chairperson of the Subcommittee on Parliamentary Ethics of the Verkhovna Rada of Ukraine.

Zahorodnyi was also:

- Member of the Ukrainian part of interparliamentary assembly with the parliaments of Georgia, Moldova, and Ukraine
- Member of a group for inter-parliamentary relations with the United Arab Emirates
- Member of a group for inter-parliamentary relations with China
- Member of a group for inter-parliamentary relations with Hungary
- Member of a group for inter-parliamentary relations with South Korea

=== 2022 Russian invasion of Ukraine ===
Following the 2022 Russian invasion of Ukraine, Zahorodnyi shifted his position, abandoning once-close ally Viktor Medvedchuk and employing the usage of Ukrainian nationalist rhetoric, saying, "Ukraine is my homeland, Russia is an aggressor and Putin is the main criminal of the 21st century." Zahorodnyi also claimed he had joined his town's local Territorial Defense Forces unit. On 12 May 2022, Zahorodnyi became one of the founding members of the Platform for Life and Peace.

== Honours and awards ==
- The civil servant of the first rank (August 2003)
- Excellence in education of Ukraine (2004)
- Chevalier of the 3rd class Order of Merit (2004)

== Personal life ==
Zahorodnyi is married.
