= Serhiy Osyka =

Ukrainian politician (1955–2026)

- Сергій Осика
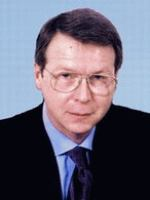
- Official Verkhovna Rada portrait, 2007

People's Deputy of Ukraine
- In office 14 May 2002 – 12 December 2012

Personal details
- Born: Serhiy Hryhorovych Osyka; 27 March 1955 Kiev, Ukrainian SSR, Soviet Union
- Died: 15 June 2026 (aged 71)
- Party: Batkivshchyna
- Education: Taras Shevchenko National University of Kyiv
- Occupation: Civil servant

Serhiy Hryhorovych Osyka (Ukrainian: Сергій Григорович Осика; 27 March 1955 – 15 June 2026) was a Ukrainian politician. A member of Batkivshchyna, he served in the Verkhovna Rada from 2002 to 2012.

Osyka died on 15 June 2026, at the age of 71.
