= 2004 Ukrainian presidential election =

Election of Viktor Yushchenko

- 31 October 2004 (first round); 21 November 2004 (second round); 26 December 2004 (second round re-run)
- Turnout: 74.54% (first round); 81.12% (second round); 77.28% (second round re-run) ▲2.41 pp
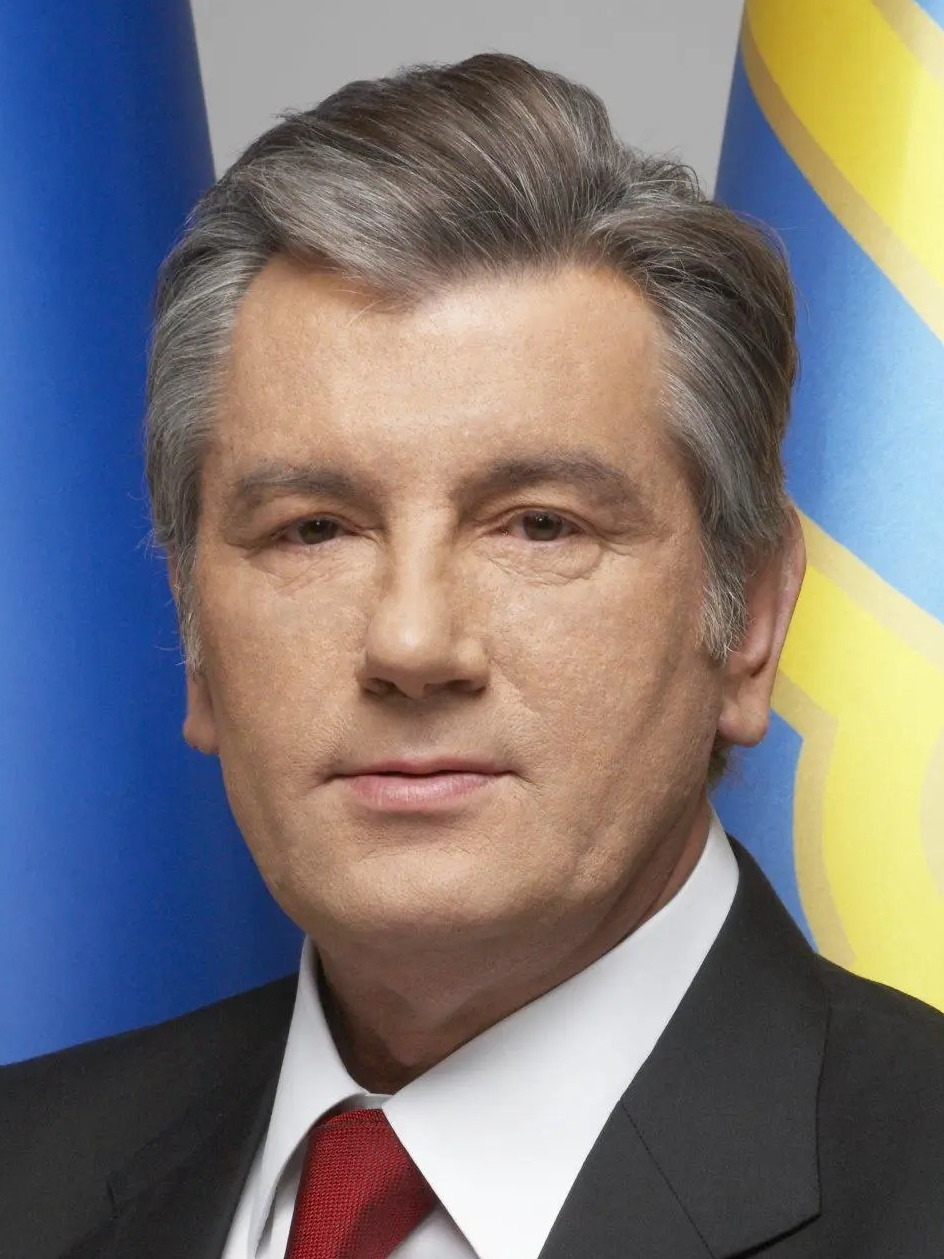

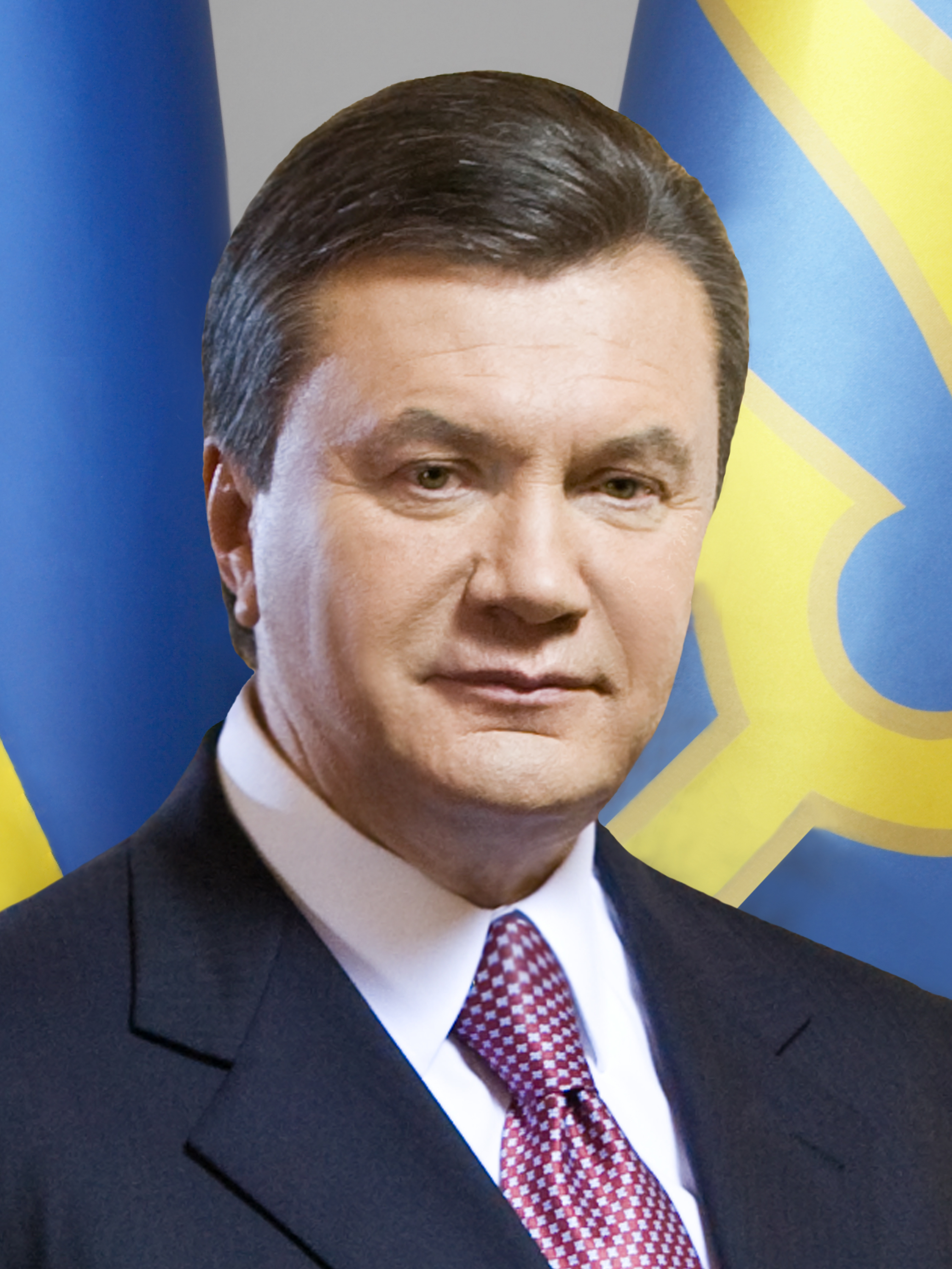
Nominee	Viktor Yushchenko	Viktor Yanukovych
Party	Independent	Party of Regions
Alliance	Our Ukraine Bloc
Popular vote	15,115,712	12,848,528
Percentage	52.77%	44.85%
President before election
Leonid Kuchma
Independent
Elected President
Viktor Yushchenko
Independent

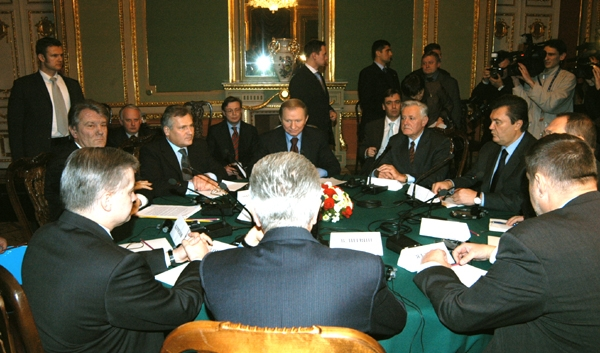
Round table talks with Ukrainian and foreign representatives during the Orange Revolution on 1 December in Kyiv.

Presidential elections were held in Ukraine on 31 October, 21 November, 26 December 2004 and 1 January 2005. This was the fourth presidential election in Ukraine following independence from the Soviet Union. The last stages of the election were contested between the opposition leader Viktor Yushchenko and incumbent Prime Minister Viktor Yanukovych from the Party of Regions. It was later determined by the Ukrainian Supreme Court that the election was plagued by widespread falsification of the results in favour of Yanukovych.

According to Ukraine's electoral law, a two-round system is used to elect the president in which a candidate must win a majority (50% or more) of all ballots cast. The first round of voting was held on 31 October. As no candidate received over 50% of all votes cast, a run-off between the two highest-polling candidates, Yushchenko and Yanukovych, was held on 21 November. According to official Central Election Commission results announced on 23 November, the run-off election was won by Yanukovych. However, the results were challenged by Yushchenko and his supporters, with many western observers claiming that the election was rigged.

The subsequent events led to a political crisis in Ukraine, with widespread peaceful protesters, dubbed the "Orange Revolution", calling for a re-run of the second-round election. On 3 December, the Supreme Court of Ukraine declared the results of the 21 November 2004 run-off ballot invalid and ordered a repeat of the second-round ballot.

The re-run ballot was held on 26 December. Viktor Yushchenko was declared the winner with 53% of the vote to Yanukovych's 44%. Western observers reported that the re-run ballot was considered overall fairer than the previous ballots.

== Candidates ==
The two main contenders in the election were the incumbent Prime Minister and government-supported candidate Viktor Yanukovych and opposition leader Viktor Yushchenko. Viktor Yanukovych, who was the Prime Minister since 2002, was supported by the outgoing President Leonid Kuchma, as well as by the Russian government and its president Vladimir Putin.

Viktor Yushchenko was portrayed as being more pro-Western and had received support of the European Union states and the United States.

== Conduct ==
Although a 75 percent turnout was recorded in the first round, observers reported many irregularities, particularly in the regions where Yushchenko's support was seen to be strongest. It was unclear how much of an impact this had on the result.

Observers for the Organization for Security and Cooperation in Europe (OSCE) said the run-off vote "did not meet international standards" and U.S. senior election observer, Senator Richard Lugar, called it a "concerted and forceful program of election day fraud". Between the two rounds of the election, dramatic increases in turnout were recorded in Yanukovych-supporting regions, while Yushchenko-supporting regions recorded the same turnout or lower than recorded in the first round. This effect was most marked in eastern Ukraine and especially in Yanukovych's stronghold of Donetsk Oblast, where a turnout of 98.5% was reportedly claimed—more than 40% up from the first round. In some districts, turnout was recorded to be more than 100%, with one district reported by observers to have recorded a 127% turnout. According to election observers and post-election investigations, pro-Yanukovych activists traveled around the country and voted many times as absentees. Some groups dependent on government assistance, such as students, hospital patients and prisoners, were told to vote for the government candidate.

Many other alleged irregularities were reported, including ballot stuffing, intimidation at voting booths and huge numbers of new voters appearing on the electoral rolls—in Donetsk alone, half a million more voters were registered for the runoff election. Yanukovych won all but one of the regions where significant increases in turnout were noted. It was later determined by the Ukrainian Supreme Court that this was in fact due to widespread falsification of the results.

=== International reactions ===
The European Union made it clear that they would not recognize the election results. All 25 member countries summoned their ambassadors from Ukraine in order to register a sharp protest against what was seen as election fraud. European Commission President José Manuel Barroso warning of consequences if there is no review of the election. During a meeting between Putin and EU officials in the Hague, the Russian president opposed the EU reaction by saying that he was "deeply convinced that we have no moral right to push a big European state to any kind of massive disorder."

Among EU member countries, Ukraine's western neighbors were most concerned. In Poland, Ukraine's largest western neighbor, politicians, the media and ordinary citizens enthusiastically supported Yushchenko and opposed the election fraud. Polish deputies to the European Parliament have called for giving Ukraine the prospect of future EU membership provided the country conformed to democratic standards. Western EU members are however more reluctant with the idea of Ukrainian membership in the EU, which results in Polish media accusing them of being more interested in the integration process with Turkey and maintaining good relations with Russia.

On 25 November former Ukrainian foreign minister and a close collaborator of Yushchenko, Borys Tarasyuk delivered a speech before the Polish Sejm, urging Poland not to recognize the election result and help solve the political crisis. On the same day former Polish President Lech Wałęsa went to Kyiv to publicly express his support for Viktor Yushchenko. He was later followed by a number of Polish MPs from different parties.

On 26 November the President of Poland Aleksander Kwaśniewski arrived in Kyiv, followed on the same day by the EU High Representative for Foreign Affairs Javier Solana and the Lithuanian president Valdas Adamkus.

The United States government also decided not to recognize the election, and expressed dissatisfaction with the results; the outgoing US Secretary of State, Colin Powell, unequivocally stated that the result announced could not be accepted as legitimate by the United States. President George W. Bush and various members of Congress made statements disclosing their concern over the legitimacy of the polling. Prominent former Cold War hawk Zbigniew Brzezinski cast the election as opposition to renewed Russian imperialism:

Russia is more likely to make a break with its imperial past if the newly independent post-Soviet states are vital and stable. Their vitality will temper any residual Russian imperial temptations. Political and economic support for the new states must be an integral part of a broader strategy for integrating Russia into a cooperative transcontinental system. A sovereign Ukraine is a critically important component of such a policy, as is support for such strategically pivotal states as Azerbaijan and Uzbekistan.

U.S. Senators John McCain and Hillary Clinton jointly wrote a letter nominating Victor Yushchenko along with Georgian President Mikheil Saakashvili for the Nobel Peace Prize. The nomination was unsuccessful.

Russia's president, Vladimir Putin congratulated Viktor Yanukovych, which was followed shortly afterward by Belarusian president Alexander Lukashenko, on his victory before election results were officially declared. CIS election observers praised the second round of the elections as "legitimate and of a nature that reflected democratic standards", a view in direct contradiction to other monitoring organizations such as the ENEMO, the Committee of Voters of Ukraine and the IEOM.

Prominent hardliners in Russia cast the election as opposition to renewed Western imperialism. Russian Communist Party leader Gennady Zyuganov blamed the West for interfering in the situation in Ukraine in the run-up to the 31 October presidential election:

I have been in Kyiv for a third day and I see for myself that the numerous actions of local opposition bear the earmarks of those groups that at different times tried to destabilize Prague, Budapest and Bucharest — the earmarks of U.S. special services.

On 28 November Moscow mayor Yury Luzhkov gave a speech denouncing the Ukrainian opposition, calling its members a "sabbath of witches" pretending to "represent the whole of the nation." Russian newspapers have printed increasingly shrill warnings, with the Communist party paper Pravda claiming: "NATO troops in Hungary and Poland are preparing to move, and Romanian and Slovak military units have been put on alert. Ukrainian towns are in their sights."

Several other CIS countries lined up with Russia in supporting Yanukovych. Belarusian President Alexander Lukashenko phoned Yanukovych to offer his own congratulations before the results had been officially declared. Kazakhstan's President Nursultan Nazarbayev wrote to Yanukovych that "Your victory shows that the Ukrainian people have made a choice in favour of the unity of the nation, of democratic development and economic progress." The presidents of Kyrgyzstan (Askar Akayev) and of Uzbekistan (Islam Karimov) likewise sent their congratulations. However, later Karimov criticized Russia's involvement in the Ukrainian election, saying that "Russia's excessive demonstration of its willingness to see a certain outcome in the vote has done more harm than good."

In contrast, the Georgian president Mikheil Saakashvili indicated his support for the supporters of Yushchenko, saying that "What is happening in Ukraine today clearly attests to the importance of Georgia's example for the rest of the world." This was a reference to the Rose Revolution of late 2003. Indeed, Georgians have been highly visible in the demonstrations in Kyiv and the flag of Georgia has been among those on display in the city's Independence Square, while Yushchenko himself held up a rose in a seeming reference to the Rose Revolution. Moldova's Foreign Ministry issued a statement late November 2004 that stated "basic democratic principles were distorted" and expressed regret that the poll "lacked the objective criteria necessary for their recognition by both the citizens of Ukraine and the international community".

Armenia and Azerbaijan kept more cautious positions, supporting neither side but stressing the need for Ukrainian unity.

On 2 December, one day before the Supreme Court ruled in favor of a repeat runoff ballot, President Kuchma visited Moscow to discuss the crisis with Russia's President Vladimir Putin. Putin supported Kuchma's position of desiring wholly new elections, rather than just a repeat of the second round.

== Results ==
The first round was held on 31 October. The official results recorded Viktor Yushchenko with 41% and Victor Yanukovych with 40% of the votes cast. As no candidate had secured over 50% of all votes cast (including invalid and blank votes) required for outright victory, a run-off election was scheduled for 21 November.

Following the run-off, the electoral commission declared Yanukovych the winner with 49.42% of all votes cast, while Yushchenko had received 46.69%.

However, the results were challenged by Yushchenko and his supporters. Protests, later known as the Orange Revolution, were held calling for a re-run of the second round. On 3 December the Supreme Court declared the second round results to be invalid and ordered a repeat of the vote. The re-run ballot was held on 26 December, with Yushchenko declared the winner with 53% of the vote to Yanukovych's 45%.

Yanukovych conceded defeat on 31 December and resigned as Prime Minister the same day. However, he made a Supreme Court appeal regarding the conduct of the elections. This was rejected on 6 January and on 10 January the Electoral Commission officially declared Yushchenko the winner. On 11 January it published the final election results, clearing the way for Yushchenko to be inaugurated as Ukraine's third President. The official ceremonies took place on Sunday, 23 January at about noon, when Yushchenko undertook the constitutional oath was sworn in as president.

Candidate	Party	First round		Second round		Second round re-run	
Candidate	Party	Votes	%	Votes	%	Votes	%
Viktor Yushchenko	Independent	11,188,675	41.13	14,222,289	47.37	15,115,712	52.77
Viktor Yanukovych	Party of Regions	11,008,731	40.47	15,093,691	50.27	12,848,528	44.85
Oleksandr Moroz	Socialist Party of Ukraine	1,632,098	6.00				
Petro Symonenko	Communist Party of Ukraine	1,396,135	5.13				
Nataliya Vitrenko	Progressive Socialist Party of Ukraine	429,794	1.58				
Anatoliy Kinakh	Party of Industrialists and Entrepreneurs of Ukraine	262,530	0.97				
Oleksandr Yakovenko	Communist Party of Workers and Peasants	219,191	0.81				
Oleksandr Omelchenko	Unity	136,830	0.50				
Leonid Chernovetskyi	Independent	129,066	0.47				
Dmytro Korchynsky	Independent	49,961	0.18				
Andriy Chornovil	Independent	36,278	0.13				
Mykola Hrabar	Independent	19,675	0.07				
Mykhailo Brodskyy	Independent	16,498	0.06				
Yuriy Zbitnyev	New Power	16,321	0.06				
Serhiy Komisarenko	Independent	13,754	0.05				
Vasyl Volha	Public Control	12,956	0.05				
Bohdan Boyko	People's Movement of Ukraine for Unity	12,793	0.05				
Oleksandr Rzhavskyy	United Family	10,714	0.04				
Mykola Rohozhynskyy	Independent	10,289	0.04				
Vladyslav Kryvobokov	People's Party of Depositors and Social Protection	9,340	0.03				
Oleksandr Bazylyuk	Slavic Party	8,963	0.03				
Ihor Dushyn	Liberal Democratic Party of Ukraine	8,623	0.03				
Roman Kozak	OUN in Ukraine	8,410	0.03				
Volodymyr Nechyporuk	Independent	6,171	0.02				
Against all		556,962	2.05	707,284	2.36	682,239	2.38
Total		27,200,758	100.00	30,023,264	100.00	28,646,479	100.00
Valid votes		27,200,758	97.02	30,023,264	98.40	28,646,479	98.55
Invalid/blank votes		834,426	2.98	488,025	1.60	422,492	1.45
Total votes		28,035,184	100.00	30,511,289	100.00	29,068,971	100.00
Registered voters/turnout		37,613,022	74.54	37,613,022	81.12	37,613,022	77.28
Source: Central Election Commission of Ukraine

== Analysis ==
The geographic distribution of the votes showed a clear east–west division of Ukraine, which is rooted deeply in the country's history. The western and central parts roughly correspond with the former territories of the Polish–Lithuanian Commonwealth in the 17th century. They are considered more pro-Western, with the population mostly Ukrainian-speaking and Ukrainian Greek Catholic (Uniate) in the west or Ukrainian Orthodox in the center, and have voted predominantly for Yushchenko. The heavy-industrialized eastern part, including the Autonomous Republic of Crimea, where the links with Russia and the Russian Orthodox Church are much stronger, and which contains many ethnic Russians, is a Yanukovych stronghold.

Many commentators saw the elections as being influenced by outside powers, notably the United States, the European Union and Russia, with the US and EU backing Yushchenko (Secretary of State Henry Kissinger, former National Security Advisor Zbigniew Brzezinski and Senator John McCain all visited Kyiv, in official or private capacities), and Russian president Vladimir Putin publicly backing Yanukovych. In the media the two candidates were contrasted, with Yushchenko representing both the pro-Western Kyiv residents as well as the rural Ukrainians, whereas Yanukovych representing the Eastern, pro-Russian industrial laborers.

More specifically it was considered that a Yushchenko victory would represent a halt of Ukraine's integration with the rest of the Commonwealth of Independent States, and possibly a cancellation of the Common Economic Space between Russia, Ukraine, Belarus and Kazakhstan that had already been agreed to by the Ukrainian parliament; he would instead be likely to increase attempts at further integration with Europe and a possible membership in the EU and NATO. Viktor Yanukovych had promised to make Russian an official language for Ukraine, as is also the case in other CIS member states Belarus, Kazakhstan and Kyrgyzstan.

== Aftermath ==
Despite alleged convincing evidence pointing to high-level involvement in the Leonid Kuchma administration and the Central Election Commission of Ukraine no criminal election fraud charges were filed against any top officials. The prosecutor general did arrest several public figures on charges of election fraud in the first half of 2005, but no high-profile case was brought to court. On 23 September 2005 Yushchenko announced a pact with the Party of Regions in which he promised to look into an amnesty for those convicted of vote rigging during the 2004 Ukrainian presidential elections. One of the top election-fraud suspects, former CEC head Serhiy Kivalov, is a Party of Regions deputy who heads the Ukrainian Parliament's Judiciary Committee.

In November 2009 Yanukovych stated that although his victory in the elections was "taken away", he gave up this victory in order to avoid bloodshed, commenting: "I didn't want mothers to lose their children and wives their husbands. I didn't want dead bodies from Kyiv to flow down the Dnipro. I didn't want to assume power through bloodshed."

During the 2010 presidential election-campaign, Viktor Yanukovych pledged to prevent electoral fraud during those elections, saying: "We will properly respond to all provocations and attempts to fake election results".
