= Mykola Kolisnyk =

Ukrainian statesman

- Микола Колісник
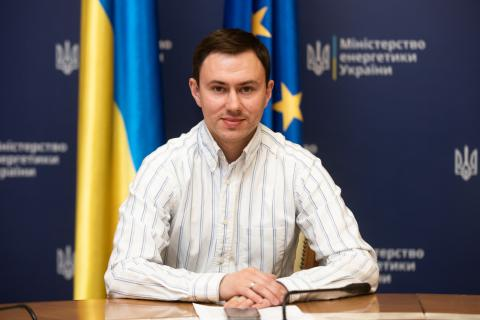

Deputy Minister of Energy of Ukraine
- Incumbent
- Assumed office 13 May 2022
- President: Volodymyr Zelenskyy
- Prime Minister: Denys Shmyhal

Personal details
- Born: 4 November 1988 (age 37) Zbarazh, Ternopil Oblast, Ukrainian SSR, Soviet Union (now Ukraine)
- Education: Kyiv National Economic University

Mykola Oleksandrovych Kolisnyk (Ukrainian: Микола Олександрович Колісник; born 4 November 1988) is a Ukrainian statesman, as well as the Deputy Minister of Energy of Ukraine.

== Early life ==
Mykola Kolisnyk was born on 4 November 1988, in Zbarazh, Ternopil Oblast, Ukraine.

=== Education ===
In 2014, he graduated from Kyiv National Economic University, majoring in Jurisprudence.

He completed specialized training abroad, in particular: JICA (Japan) courses on energy planning and management in energy markets; under the program BP & SOCAR management in the energy sector - ADA University (Azerbaijan, Baku).

From 2023 to 2025, he is studying for an MBA in Executive Energy Management at the Vienna University of Economics and Business.

In 2024, he graduated as a Strategic Architect from Kyiv-Mohyla Business School.

=== Career ===
He started working in foreign commercial enterprises of the oil and gas complex.

For three years he worked at the Antimonopoly Committee of Ukraine.

From 2016 to 2022, he worked his way up from chief specialist to director of the Directorate at the Ministry of Energy. He worked on the implementation of European legislation, in particular EU Regulations and Directives, on the security of natural gas supply, on daily balancing on the natural gas market, implementation of technical regulations on the quality of light petroleum products, coordinated cooperation with the NATO Energy Security Center on strengthening the security of critical energy infrastructure facilities. He was engaged in the development and implementation of MFI and MTD projects in the energy sector, more than 64 projects of Ukrtransgaz, OGTSU, NJSC Naftogaz of Ukraine.

From May 2018 until the appointment to the post of Deputy Minister has been working as Head of the Directorate of the Oil and Gas Complex and Development of Oil, Natural Gas and Oil Products Markets.

Ensured policy formation in the oil and gas complex, interaction with the enterprises of the oil and gas complex, implementation of projects to increase gas production, and signing of agreements on product distribution.

On 13 May 2022 he was appointed Deputy Minister of Energy of Ukraine.

He is a representative of the Ministry at the International Energy Charter and a natural gas expert in the UNECE.

Mykola Kolisnyk represents the position of the Ministry of Energy of Ukraine at many international forums and conferences. He is a participant in negotiations on establishing cooperation in the energy, natural gas and petroleum products sectors between Ukraine, the United States and EU member states.

== Expertise ==
- Ukrainian storage and pipelines can be key to east Europe’s gas supply security // Euractiv
- Sanctions against Russian LNG already have impact and can work even better // Euractiv
- Alternative front: Resisting russia's appetites in the gas market // Mind.ua
- How Ukraine can accelerate European energy transition – interview with Deputy Minister of Energy, Mykola Kolisnyk // Ceenergy News
- Opinion: Russia’s shadow fleet strategy draws from Iran’s playbook // Kyiv Independent
- Ukrainian Storage and Pipelines Can be Key to East Europe’s Gas Supply Security // KyivPost
- Attracting European traders to Ukrainian market is one of the priorities for development of oil and gas industry: Mykola Kolisnyk // Government of Ukraine
- Ukrainian energy facilities untouched by latest Russian night attack // The New Voice of Ukraine
- Heads of GTSOU and the Ministry of Energy discussed prospects for the development of the GTS // Transmission System Operator UA
