= Oleh Petrov =

Ukrainian politician (1960–2023)

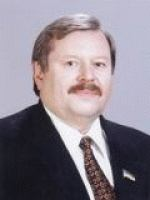
- Petrov in 2002

People's Deputy of Ukraine
- In office 12 May 1998 – 25 May 2006

Personal details
- Born: Oleh Volodymyrovych Petrov; 20 August 1960 Pavlohrad, Dnipropetrovsk Oblast, Ukrainian SSR, USSR
- Died: 20 January 2023 (aged 62) Kyiv, Ukraine
- Party: NDP
- Education: Dnipropetrovsk State University
- Occupation: Sailor

Oleh Volodymyrovych Petrov (Ukrainian: Оле́г Володи́мирович Петро́в; 20 August 1960 – 20 January 2023) was a Ukrainian politician. A member of the People's Democratic Party, he served in the Verkhovna Rada from 1998 to 2006.

Petrov died in Kyiv on 20 January 2023, at the age of 62.
