= Stanislav Strebko =

Soviet seafarer and Ukrainian politician

Hero of Ukraine Stanislav Strebko
- Станіслав Стребко
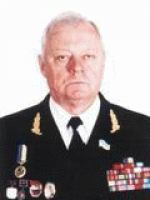
- Official Verkhovna Rada portrait, 2002
- Born: February 28, 1937; Molochansk, Ukrainian SSR, Soviet Union
- Died: July 28, 2008 (aged 71); Illichivsk, Ukraine
- Resting place: Chornomorsk, Ukraine
- Citizenship: Soviet Union; Ukraine
- Education: Odessa Seafaring School of Marinesko
- Occupations: Seaport dispatcher; administrator

Stanislav Kyrylovych Strebko (Ukrainian: Станіслав Кирилович Стребко; 28 February 1937 – 28 July 2008) was a Soviet seafarer and Ukrainian politician.

== See also ==
- Port of Chornomorsk
