= Borys Bespalyi =

Ukrainian engineer and politician (1953–2022)

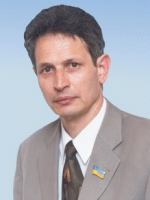
- Bespalyi in 2006

People's Deputy of Ukraine
- In office 12 May 1998 – 23 November 2007

Personal details
- Born: Borys Yakovych Bespalyi; 25 May 1953 Irpin, Kyiv Oblast, Ukrainian SSR, USSR
- Died: 17 October 2022 (aged 69)
- Party: NDP; Independent; HY
- Education: Kyiv Pedagogical Institute
- Occupation: Engineer

Borys Yakovych Bespalyi (Ukrainian: Бори́с Я́кович Беспа́лий; 25 May 1953 – 17 October 2022) was a Ukrainian engineer and politician. A member of the People's Democratic Party and later Our Ukraine, he served in the Verkhovna Rada from 1998 to 2007.

Bespalyi died on 17 October 2022, at the age of 69.
