= Petro Symonenko =

Ukrainian politician (born 1952)

- Петро Симоненко
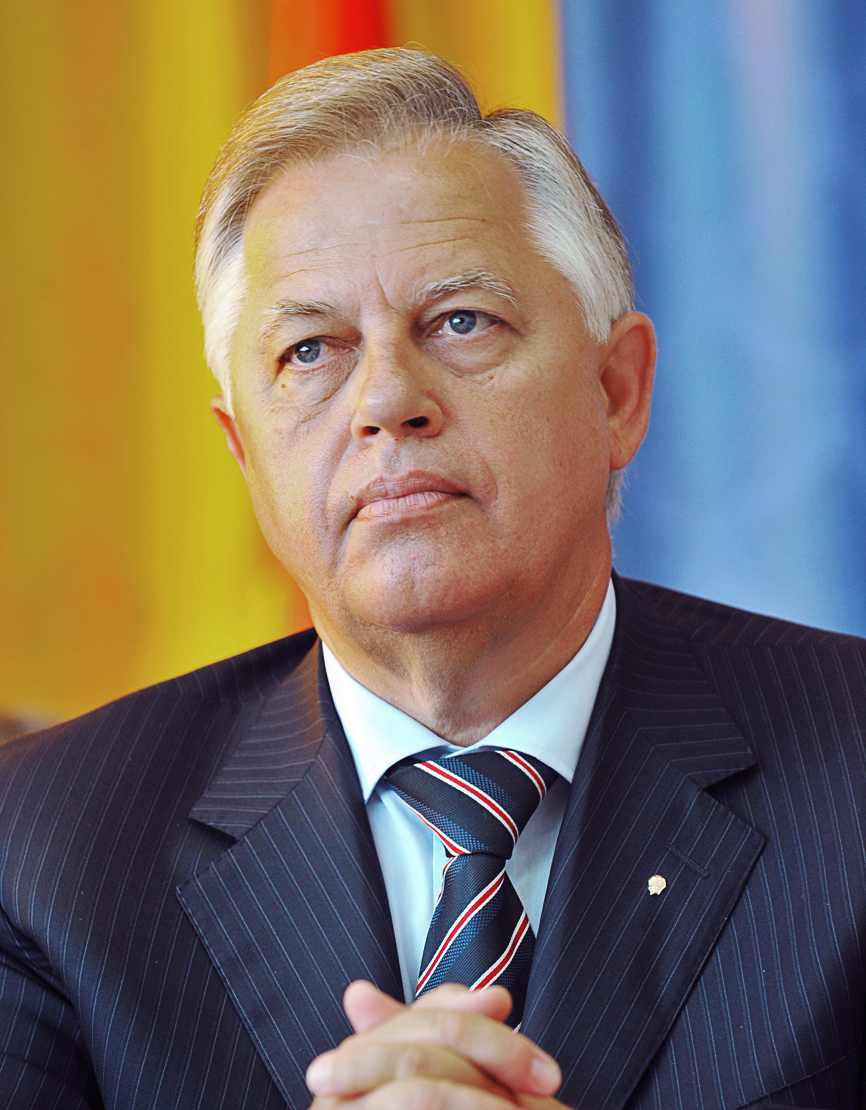
- Symonenko in 2011

First Secretary of the Central Committee of the Communist Party of Ukraine
- Incumbent
- Assumed office 19 June 1993
- Preceded by: Position established

People's Deputy of Ukraine
- In office 12 May 1994 – 27 November 2014
- Constituency: Donetsk Oblast, No. 150 (1994–1998); KPU, No. 1 (1998–2014)

Personal details
- Born: 1 August 1952 (age 74) Stalino, Ukrainian SSR, Soviet Union (now Donetsk)
- Party: Communist Party of Ukraine
- Other political affiliations: Communist Party of the Soviet Union (1978–1991)
- Spouses: Svetlana Vladimirovna Simonenko (m. 1974; div. 2009) Oksana Nikolayevna Vashchenko (m. 2009)
- Children: Maria (born 2009), Andrey, Konstantin, Ivan, Timofey
- Website: rada.gov.ua

Petro Mykolayovych Symonenko (Ukrainian: Петро́ Микола́йович Симоне́нко; born 1 August 1952) is a Ukrainian politician and the First Secretary of the Central Committee of the Communist Party of Ukraine. Symonenko was the party's candidate in the 1999 and 2004, 2010, (Note: In the 2010 Ukrainian presidential election, Symonenko was the candidate of the Bloc of Left and Center-left Forces, of which the Communist Party of Ukraine was a part.) and until his withdrawal, the 2014 Ukrainian presidential elections. The Central Election Commission of Ukraine prohibited his candidacy for the 2019 Ukrainian presidential election because the statute, name, and symbolism of his party did not comply with the decommunization laws in Ukraine.

== Biography ==
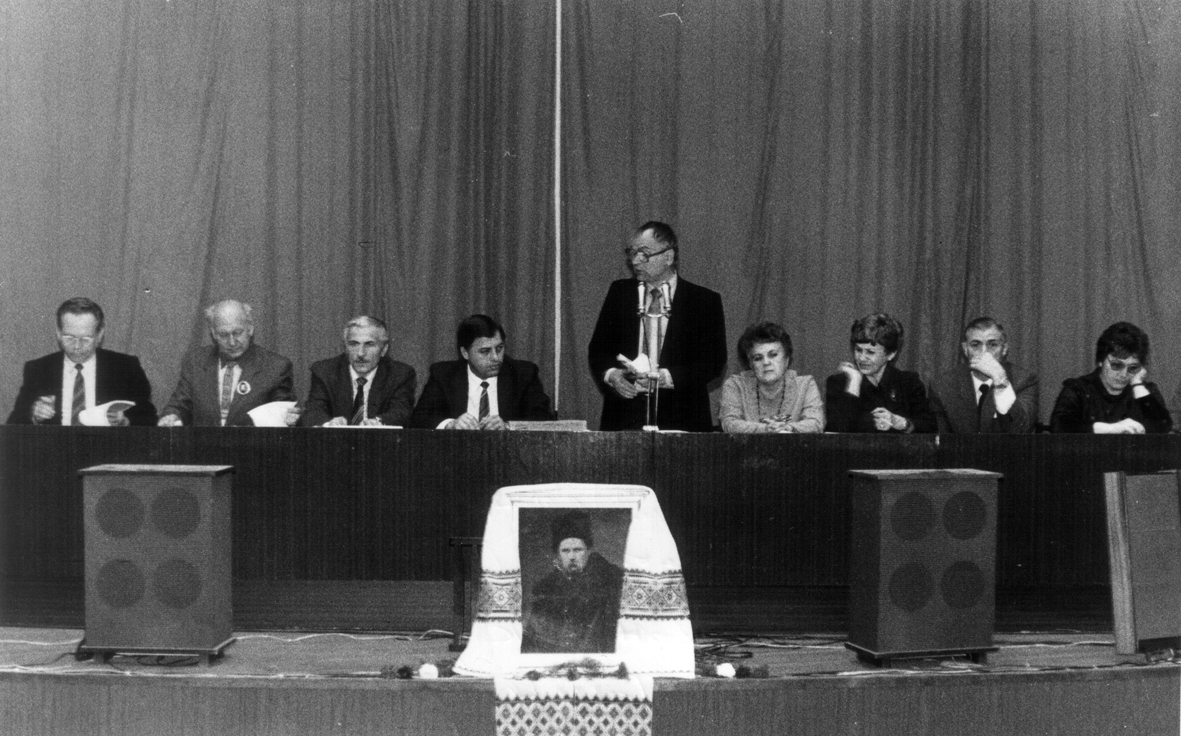
Symonenko (seated fourth from left, between Volodymyr Biletskyy and Dmytro Pavlychko) at the meeting of the Taras Shevchenko Fellowship of Ukrainian Language in Donetsk, 28 October 1989

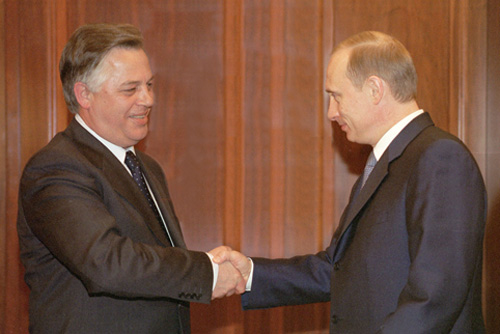
Symonenko at the Kremlin in 2002 with Vladimir Putin

Symonenko was born in Stalino (now Donetsk). He became a member of the Communist Party of the Soviet Union in 1978, and worked as a party functionary in the 1980s. He has been the First Secretary of the Central Committee of the Communist Party of Ukraine since 1993. He is also the chairman of the Communist Party Faction in the Verkhovna Rada (Ukraine's Parliament).

Symonenko has been a Ukrainian delegate to the Parliamentary Assembly of the Council of Europe. From 1994 to 1996 he was a member of the Ukrainian parliament's Constitution Commission. He was a candidate in the 1999 Ukrainian presidential election, receiving 22.24% of the votes in the first round and taking second place. In the second round he won 37.8% of the votes, losing to Leonid Kuchma. His election program had classic Communist content.

In late 2002, Viktor Yushchenko (Our Ukraine), Oleksandr Moroz (Socialist Party of Ukraine), Yulia Tymoshenko (Yulia Tymoshenko Bloc), and Symonenko issued a joint statement concerning "the beginning of a state revolution in Ukraine". His party left the alliance, as Symonenko was against a single candidate from the alliance in the 2004 Ukrainian presidential election; the other three parties remained allies, at least until July 2006.

Symonenko's support sharply declined at the time of the 2004 presidential election. He received 5% of the votes and came in fourth place, unable to get into the controversial runoff which caused the Orange Revolution. Symonenko was re-elected to the Verkhovna Rada in the 2007 Ukrainian parliamentary election. At the opening of the new parliament's first session on 23 November 2007, he was re-elected as chairman of the Communist Party faction.

During the 2010 Ukrainian presidential election, Symonenko was the candidate of the Bloc of Left and Center-left Forces, receiving 3.54% of the votes. In 2012 Ukrainian parliamentary election, he was re-elected into the Verkhovna Rada. In the 2014 Ukrainian presidential election, he initially ran as a candidate of his party on a federalization-platform that should have eventually led to a "parliamentary system without the institution of the presidency at all". He withdrew from the race on 16 May. He stated he withdrew "to save Ukraine from arbitrariness, which takes place today", and said about the elections itself "in our opinion they will be illegitimate". Later the same day, Symonenko's car was attacked by a mob with baseball bats and Molotov cocktails as he left a TV interview. He was uninjured in the incident. In the 2014 presidential election, he received 1.51% of the vote.

The Central Election Commission of Ukraine did not register his candidacy for the 2019 Ukrainian presidential election due to the fact that the statute, name, and symbolism of the Communist Party of Ukraine did not comply with 2015 decommunization laws. In late May 2021, TV channel 112 Ukraine received a fine of ₴100,000 for broadcasting Symonenko's claim that the war in Donbas was "a civil war" initiated by "Ukrainian nationalists and neo-fascists supported by the United States."

During the 2022 Russian invasion of Ukraine, Simonenko has taken a pro-Russian stance. In March 2022, as reported by Obozrevatel, he managed to escape from Kyiv to Belarus during the Kyiv offensive with the assistance of Russian forces. In October 2022, Symonenko took part in the International Meeting of Communist and Workers' Parties in Havana, Cuba. During the speech, he blamed the United States and the United Kingdom for the war, and said they wanted to "use Ukraine against Russia and Taiwan against China".

In August 2023, the Security Service of Ukraine opened an investigation against Symonenko on the charges of sedition and treason. The investigation established that during the Russian occupation of Kyiv Oblast of the 2022 Russian invasion of Ukraine he had fled to Russia accompanied by Russian Special Forces. In Russia Symonenko was appointed deputy chairman of the Union of Communist Parties – Communist Party of the Soviet Union.

Symonenko assets were blocked and he was stripped of his Ukrainian state awards on 19 January 2025 by a decree of Ukrainian President Volodymyr Zelenskyy.

== Political positions ==
On 28 November 2006, the Ukrainian Parliament narrowly passed a law defining the Holodomor as a deliberate act of genocide and made public denial illegal. Commenting in 2007, Symonenko said that he "does not believe there was any deliberate starvation at all", and accused Viktor Yushchenko of "using the famine to stir up hatred". In response, Yushchenko declared he wanted "a new law criminalising Holodomor denial". In May 2012, Symonenko defended the deportation of the Crimean Tatars, saying that this measure saved Crimean Tatars because otherwise a civil war would have started.
