= 1998 Ukrainian parliamentary election =

- 29 March 1998

All 450 seats in the Verkhovna Rada 226 seats needed for a majority
- Turnout: 70.78% (▼5.03 pp)
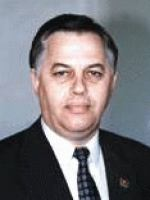

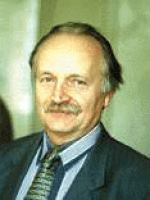

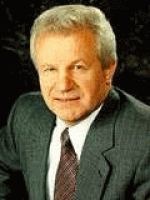

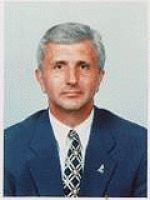

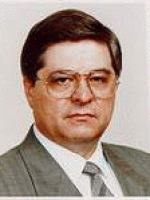

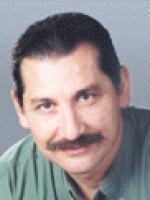

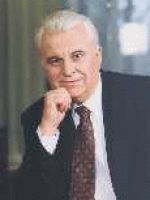

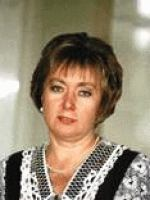
	First party	Second party	Third party
Leader	Petro Symonenko	Viacheslav Chornovil	Oleksandr Moroz
Party	KPU	Rukh	SPU–SelPU
Leader since	19 June 1993	4 December 1992	1 November 1997
Leader's seat	Party list	Party list	Kyiv Oblast 92
Last election	86 seats, 13.57%	20 seats, 5.49%	33 seats, 6.23%
Seats won	121	46	34
Seat change	▲35	▲26	▲1
Popular vote	6,550,353	2,498,262	2,273,788
Percentage	25.44% (PR)	9.70% (PR)	8.83% (PR)
Swing	▲11.87%	▲4.21%	▲2.60%
	Fourth party	Fifth party	Sixth party
Leader	Anatoliy Matviyenko	Pavlo Lazarenko	Vitaliy Kononov
Party	NDP	Hromada	Party of Greens
Leader since	24 February 1996	22 March 1994	9 October 1992
Leader's seat	Vinnytsia Oblast 17	Dnipropetrovsk Oblast 40	Party list
Last election	New	New	0 seats 0.27%
Seats won	28	24	19
Seat change	New	New	▲19
Popular vote	1,331,460	1,242,235	1,444,264
Percentage	5.17% (PR)	4.82% (PR)	5.61% (PR)
Swing	New	New	▲5.34%
	Seventh party	Eighth party
Leader	Leonid Kravchuk	Nataliya Vitrenko
Party	SDPU(o)	PSPU
Leader since	—	20 April 1996
Leader's seat	Party list	Sumy 160
Last election	New	New
Seats won	17	16
Seat change	New	New
Popular vote	1,066,113	1,075,118
Percentage	4.14% (PR)	4.18% (PR)
Swing	New	New
Chairman of the Verkhovna Rada before election
Oleksandr Moroz
SPU–SelPU
Elected Chairman of the Verkhovna Rada
Oleksandr Tkachenko
SPU–SelPU

Parliamentary elections were held in Ukraine on 29 March 1998. The Communist Party of Ukraine remained the largest party in the Verkhovna Rada (parliament of Ukraine), winning 121 of the 445 seats, but no party gained a majority of seats, resulting in a hung parliament that eventually resulted in elements of the left supportive of president Leonid Kuchma being placed in leadership positions.

Poor perception of the economy and Kuchma's economic liberalisation programme was a key issue in the election, as was the perception that Kuchma and members of his government were closely connected with Ukrainian oligarchs and members of the Ukrainian mafia and that the Verkhovna Rada's deputies were largely corrupt. Ukraine's oligarch and mafia groups (including leading "clans" such as the Dnipropetrovsk Mafia, the Donetsk Clan and the Kyiv Seven) participated in the election through utilising political parties as front organisations. The 1998 election was the first Ukrainian parliamentary election to used a mixed-member proportional representation system, after the previous election's first-past-the-post system resulted in electoral chaos.

The election was generally considered to be free and fair, though significant discrepancies occurred in Crimea, where members of the Crimean Tatar population were prevented from voting and engaged in violent clashes with police, and in the city of Odesa, where a series of events of electoral violence occurred as part of the simultaneous mayoral election. As a result of the election, no party formed a majority, and a standoff between the left and pro-Kuchma parties occurred for nearly four months before the election of Oleksandr Tkachenko, a member of the leftist bloc with financial connections to Kuchma's government, as Chairman of the Verkhovna Rada. Following the election, two of Kuchma's major political opponents (Pavlo Lazarenko and Oleksandr Moroz) were either forced to leave the country amidst corruption charges or subjected to a campaign of media harassment. The election highlighted the civil rights of Crimean Tatars, which continued to be in flux amidst their repatriation from Central Asia.

== Background ==
Ukraine became independent in 1991, amidst the dissolution of the Soviet Union. The period since 1991 had, by 1998, been marked by an economic crisis. At the peak of this crisis, during the previous parliamentary election in 1994, doubts existed as to the feasibility of Ukraine's survival as an independent state, according to political scientists Sarah Birch and Andrew Wilson. After Leonid Kuchma was elected as president that year, some improvements in the political situation began to take place. In particular were Russia–Ukraine relations, which had been strained as a result of disputes over the status of Crimea and the Black Sea Fleet, the supply of energy to Ukraine, and Ukraine's post-Soviet nuclear arsenal, which Kuchma saw relinquished with the finalisation of the Budapest Memorandum. Ukraine adopted a post-Soviet constitution in June 1996, with later amendments formally dating the next parliamentary election to March 1998.

The primary basis of Kuchma's support were the emerging business oligarchs (particularly the Dnipropetrovsk Mafia, a group of oligarchic and organised crime elements from Kuchma's native Dnipropetrovsk Oblast), and his presidency marked a "virtual corporate takeover" of Ukraine, according to Wilson. He had also initially been elected with the support of the left, who opposed the nation-building policies of Leonid Kravchuk. Kuchma's programme, however, had based in economic liberalisation from the outset of his 1994 campaign, and efforts to reform Ukraine's economy intensified in the period prior to the election. This led leftists to abandon their original support of Kuchma early into his presidency, characterising him as a puppet of the International Monetary Fund. Oleksandr Moroz, Chairman of the Verkhovna Rada before 1998 and leader of the Socialist Party of Ukraine, was a strong opponent of Kuchma's privatisations and the IMF, while Kuchma's links to international organisations such as the IMF and positive relations with the West buoyed his support. Continued poor economic performance was a leading factor in the election; a poll two weeks prior to the election indicted that 66.2% of respondents viewed Kuchma's economic reforms as a failure, and the two most pressing issues to voters polled were non-payment of wages by the state (33.5%) and unemployment (27.2%).

At 9.5%, the third-largest issue for voters was corruption. Kuchma's presidency was marked by the growth of the Ukrainian mafia, with several formerly-communist officials from eastern Ukraine engaging with crime interests in order to enrich themselves. Another poll, conducted by the Kyiv International Institute of Sociology, indicated that 59.6% of Ukrainians believed "almost all" or "most" People's Deputies were corrupt. Several parties were front organisations for major oligarchic-crime clans, including Hromada (tied to an anti-Kuchma branch of the Dnipropetrovsk Mafia led by Pavlo Lazarenko and Yulia Tymoshenko), the Razom coalition (comprising the Party of Labour and the Liberal Party of Ukraine, representing the Donetsk Clan), the Social Democratic Party of Ukraine (united) (connected to the Kyiv Seven and the ownership of FC Dynamo Kyiv) and the Party of Greens (which, despite having been founded as a legitimate party, was effectively sold by the party's leadership to banking interests prior to the election). Even parties which were not fronts for oligarchic or crime interests, such as the centre-right People's Movement of Ukraine (Ukrainian: Народний рух України, romanized: Narodnyi rukh Ukrainy, abbreviated Rukh) and the leftist parties, had seats on their proportional representation lists occupied by individuals associated with such groups.

=== Electoral system ===
The 1994 parliamentary election used a two-round system based on previous Soviet laws that had been designed for the one-party state, including stipulations that 50% of voters in each constituency turn out and that the successful candidate had one more vote than 50% of the turnout. The results of this system had been chaotic, with constituencies taking as many as five rounds to elect a People's Deputy. A year after the 1994 election, 10% of seats in the Verkhovna Rada (Ukrainian parliament) remained unfilled, and some were still vacant by the time of the 1998 election.

Following the chaos of the 1994 election, all parties save for the Communist Party of Ukraine (Ukrainian: Комуністична партія України, romanized: Komunistychna partiia Ukrainy, abbreviated KPU) agreed that electoral reform was needed to establish a stable democratic system and simplify the electoral process. Early discussions on electoral reform focused on a mixed-member proportional representation similar to that which had been adopted by Russia for elections to the State Duma in 1993. The KPU initially opposed any adoption of proportional representation, but later supported it after recognising that proportional representation would be likely to increase the amount of seats they held in the Verkhovna Rada. The electoral reform law, adopted in September 1997, provided for a 50/50 split of seats in the Rada between single-member districts and party-list proportional representation seats, with the latter having a threshold of 4%. All turnout requirements were abolished as a result of the electoral reform, and, rather than crossing out all candidates which they opposed of (as was the system under the Soviet-era laws), voters were required to simply select the candidate they supported.

After the election, a number of provisions in the election reform were declared unconstitutional by the Constitutional Court of Ukraine. These provisions were later amended.

== Electoral campaign ==
The eleven major parties had widely varying political positions during the electoral campaign, with most being opposed to Kuchma's government. The eight parties ultimately elected into the Verkhovna Rada's proportional representation seats professed the following policies:

- Communist Party of Ukraine (Ukrainian: Комуністична партія України, romanized: Komunistychna partiia Ukrainy, KPU): abolition of the presidency of Ukraine; establishment of the Russian language as the second state language of Ukraine; Ukrainian accession to the Union State; opposition to the economic liberalisation, the International Monetary Fund, the World Bank and NATO. The party's leader is Petro Symonenko.
- People's Movement of Ukraine (Ukrainian: Народний рух України, romanized: Narodnyi rukh Ukrainy, Rukh): opposition to Kuchma's government and the left; support for economic and political reforms; pro-Western and centre-right. Highly-placed candidates on its party list included Viacheslav Chornovil (the party's leader and a former prisoner of conscience held by the Soviet Union), Minister of Foreign Affairs Hennadiy Udovenko, writer Ivan Drach and Crimean Tatar leader Mustafa Dzhemilev.
- Socialist Party – Peasant Party (Ukrainian: Соціалістична партія України – Селянська партія України, romanized: Sotsialistychna partiia Ukrainy – Selianska partiia Ukrainy, SPU–SelPU): Strengthened relations with members of the Commonwealth of Independent States; state control of critical industries; opposition to privatisation of land. As a political alliance, it included members of both the Socialist Party of Ukraine (led by Chairman of the Verkhovna Rada Oleksandr Moroz) and the Peasant Party of Ukraine (led by Kateryna Vashchuk and also including Rouslan Bodelan and Anatoliy Franchuk); the two parties at times held divergent views, with the Peasant Party being pro-Kuchma.
- Party of Greens of Ukraine (Ukrainian: Партія зелених України, romanized: Partiia zelenykh Ukrainy, PZU): Reduction of taxes; abolition of conscription; international neutrality; environmentalism.
- People's Democratic Party (Ukrainian: Народно-демократична партія, romanized: Narodno-demokratychna partiia, NDP): Privatisation; market economy; abolition of parliamentary immunity; European integration while retaining positive relations with Russia and members of the CIS. It was very pro-Kuchma.
- Hromada (Ukrainian: Громада): 50% reduction of taxes; restructuring of the executive government; anti-corruption. The party was largely a personal vehicle for Prime Minister Pavlo Lazarenko and a front organisation for the Dnipropetrovsk Mafia.
- Progressive Socialist Party of Ukraine (Ukrainian: Прогресивна соціалістична партія України, romanized: Prohresyvna sotsialistychn partiia Ukrainy, PSPU): abolition of the presidency; recognition of Belarus and Russia as Ukraine's strategic partners; granting worker cooperatives the exclusive right to nominate candidates for People's Deputies; strongly anti-IMF, anti-World Bank and anti-NATO; opposed to both the KPU and SPU–SelPU on the basis that neither were sufficiently left-wing.
- Social Democratic Party of Ukraine (united) (Ukrainian: Соцiал-демократична партія України (об'єднана), romanized: Sotsial-demokratychna partiia Ukrainy (obiednana), SDPU(o)): Centrism; full employment; European integration while retaining positive relations with Russia. The party was a front organisation for the Kyiv Seven, and contained several national communist figures, including former President Leonid Kravchuk and former Prime Minister Yevhen Marchuk.

=== Interventions by Kuchma ===
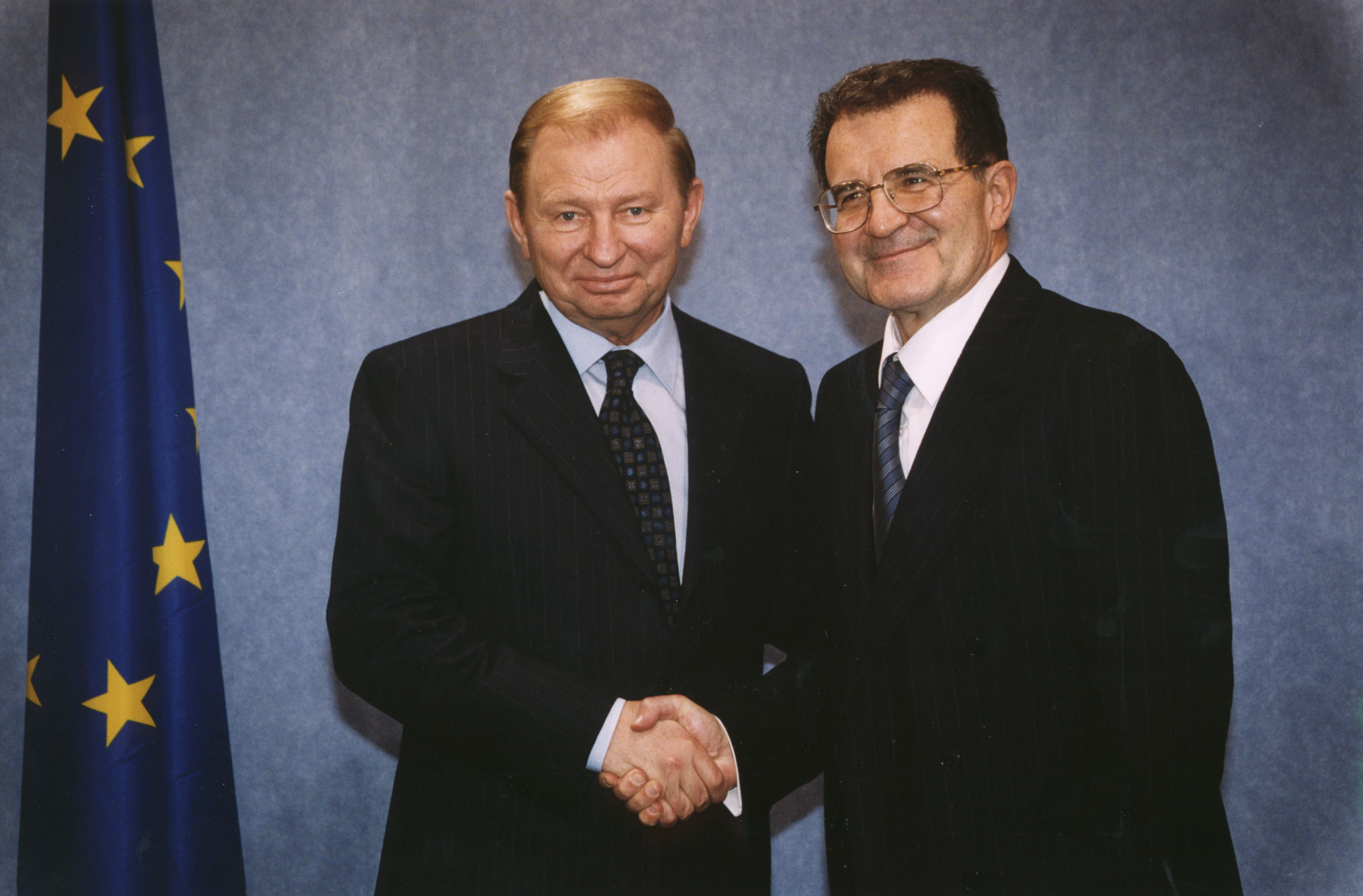
President Leonid Kuchma (on left, pictured here in 1999) and his close allies have been accused of interfering in the 1998 election

Despite only vaguely advising voters to vote "against the left", Kuchma and individuals close to him have been accused by Birch and Wilson of significantly intervening in the 1998 election, both in order to create a spoiler effect for leftist parties and to ensure the victory of the pro-government People's Democratic Party, which was intended to exist as a people's party under the leadership of Prime Minister Valeriy Pustovoitenko.

Many of the parties contesting the election were intended to spoil the results of the leftist bloc. Among these was the Agrarian Party (established in opposition to the Peasant Party's then-undisputed control over the rural population) and three parties and political alliances (Note: Laborious Ukraine, the Motherland Defenders Party and the All-Ukrainian Workers' Party) were founded with the support of the government with the intention of undermining the KPU's support among trade unions and veterans. The KPU and SPU–SelPU accused the PSPU of being directly created and supported by Kuchma's government, and Communist and Socialist media regularly attacked it as such.

The emergence of former Prime Minister Pavlo Lazarenko as a serious political opponent to Kuchma also led to Kuchma using legal measures to hinder him, including the instigating of corruption charges against him and the stripping of his parliamentary immunity. As a result of the prosecution, Lazarenko would eventually be forced to flee Ukraine before being arrested. Kuchma's government also used administrative and governmental resources to campaign for the NDP, to little success. State television channels broadcast in favour of the NDP, and individuals tied to Kuchma oversaw the split between Hromada and Yulia Tymoshenko's Batkivshchyna party.

== Results ==
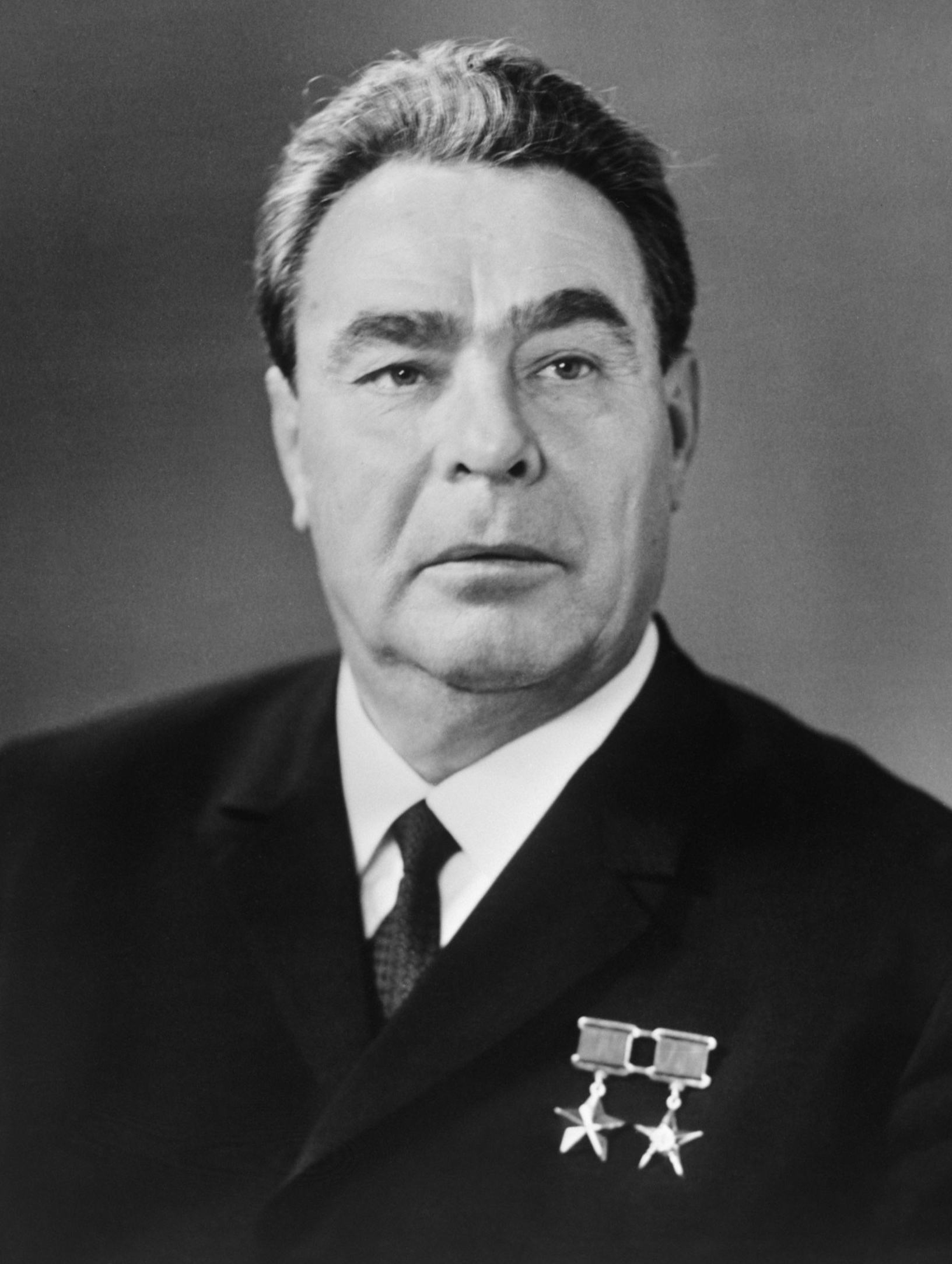
Signatures claimed to belong to Soviet leader Leonid Brezhnev (1906–1982) were among those used by parties to participate in the 1998 election

A total of 3,962 candidates were registered ahead of the election, of whom 1,717 (43.34%) were independents. Thirty parties or political alliances contested the election in total. Low threshold existed for ballot access, requiring 200,000 signatures (of which 10,000 were to come from 14 of the 26 administrative divisions of Ukraine). Little effort was made by authorities to verify signatures; in one instance, a Sumy Oblast newspaper reported that it had found signatures belonging to Soviet leader Leonid Brezhnev, Chechen military commander and politician Dzhokhar Dudayev (both of whom were deceased by 1998) and President of Russia Boris Yeltsin, with all signatories declared as living in the same apartment block.

The ultimate result was a victory for the left, with the KPU slightly expanding its plurality. Leftist parties were generally supported by those from the three easternmost oblasts of Ukraine (Donetsk, Luhansk and Kharkiv oblasts), as well as, in the case of the KPU in particular, in southern Ukraine. The SPU–SelPU alliance failed to break through in the south, but found unexpected support in the east. Western Ukraine, as well as the three westernmost oblasts of left-bank Ukraine (Chernihiv, Poltava and Sumy oblasts), were among the most unlikely oblasts to support the KPU. The SPU–SelPU alliance outperformed the KPU exclusively in Cherkasy Oblast (receiving 51.4%), but performed well across Ukraine, surpassing 30% of the vote in 12 oblasts. The Progressive Socialist Party was the next-highest-performing leftist party, but only managed to surpass 30% of the vote in Sumy Oblast. The Soyuz party, a leftist party in Crimea advocating for the region's annexation by Russia, was a notable case as a localist party in the left bloc that gained a significant portion of the region's vote (10.7%, behind only the KPU).

As in previous Ukrainian elections, ethnicity, language and religion also played a significant role in voting. The elderly, those with low levels of income, ethnic Russians and those belonging to the Ukrainian Orthodox Church (Moscow Patriarchate) being more likely to support leftist parties. By contrast, those who were not ethnic Russians, those who did not belong to the UOC(MP) and those who were employed were more likely to vote for national-democratic parties. Younger people, those with high levels of income and individuals living in central Ukraine tended to support centrist parties. Among the centrist parties, the People's Democratic Party was extremely unpopular in the south in favour of Hromada and the Greens were unpopular in eastern Ukraine.

Many of the centrist parties were concentrated into specific regions; Hromada was widely supported in the Dnipropetrovsk Mafia's eponymous oblast, while the SDPU(o) excelled in Zakarpattia as a result of both vote buying by the Kyiv Seven and a local tradition of social democracy dating back to the 1930s. The Reforms and Order Party's support was largely concentrated in Lviv Oblast, though it failed to obtain a majority of the votes there. Among national-democratic and nationalist parties, Rukh saw as much dominance as the KPU on the left, being the only right-of-centre to surpass the 4% proportional representation threshold and winning nearly three times the vote as the next-largest right-wing party, the National Front coalition. Rukh's support was largely concentrated in western Ukraine, particularly in Galicia and Rivne Oblast, though in other western oblasts it performed well enough to keep the leftist vote share below 20%.

The election was most humiliating of all for the pro-Kuchma People's Democratic Party, which won only 5% of the vote and 29 seats in the Verkhovna Rada. The People's Democratic Party had, prior to the election, already been in a state of disarray, with the party's liberal, reformist faction increasingly frustrated by its closeness to Kuchma. Although it would manage to grow dramatically in the initial period of coalition-building following the election, it would eventually collapse, splitting into several parties within a year of the election.

Party	Proportional			Constituency			Total seats	+/–
Party	Votes	%	Seats	Votes	%	Seats	Total seats	+/–
Communist Party of Ukraine	6,550,353	25.44	84	3,495,711	13.62	37	121	+35
People's Movement of Ukraine	2,498,262	9.70	32	1,500,648	5.85	14	46	+26
Socialist Party – Peasant Party	2,273,788	8.83	29	1,067,267	4.16	5	34	+1
Party of Greens of Ukraine	1,444,264	5.61	19	196,044	0.76	0	19	+19
People's Democratic Party	1,331,460	5.17	17	985,770	3.84	11	28	+24
Hromada	1,242,235	4.82	16	880,073	3.43	8	24	New
Progressive Socialist Party of Ukraine	1,075,118	4.18	14	231,043	0.90	2	16	New
Social Democratic Party of Ukraine (united)	1,066,113	4.14	14	450,522	1.76	3	17	New
Agrarian Party of Ukraine	978,330	3.80	0	784,287	3.06	9	9	New
Reforms and Order Party	832,574	3.23	0	455,166	1.77	3	3	New
Laborious Ukraine (GKU–UPS)	813,326	3.16	0	123,869	0.48	1	1	–1
National Front (KUN–UKRP–URP)	721,966	2.80	0	642,125	2.50	5	5	–10
Razom (LPU–PP)	502,969	1.95	0	309,371	1.21	1	1	–3
Forward Ukraine! (KDS–UKDP)	461,924	1.79	0	129,378	0.50	2	2	+2
Christian Democratic Party of Ukraine	344,826	1.34	0	190,783	0.74	2	2	+1
Bloc of Democratic Parties – NEP (DPU–PEV)	326,489	1.27	0	275,460	1.07	1	1	–1
Party of National Economic Development of Ukraine	250,476	0.97	0	28,418	0.11	0	0	New
SLON – Social Liberal Association (Viche–MBR)	241,367	0.94	0	112,968	0.44	1	1	0
Party of Regional Revival of Ukraine	241,262	0.94	0	204,631	0.80	2	2	New
All-Ukrainian Party of Workers	210,622	0.82	0	57,463	0.22	0	0	New
Soyuz	186,249	0.72	0	38,467	0.15	1	1	New
All-Ukrainian Party of Women's Initiatives	154,650	0.60	0	18,208	0.07	0	0	New
Republican Christian Party	143,496	0.56	0	70,064	0.27	0	0	New
Ukrainian National Assembly	105,977	0.41	0	88,136	0.34	0	0	–1
Social Democratic Party of Ukraine	85,045	0.33	0	36,670	0.14	0	0	–2
Motherland Defenders Party	81,808	0.32	0	26,286	0.10	0	0	New
Party of Spiritual, Economic and Social Progress	53,147	0.21	0	28,418	0.11	0	0	New
Party of Muslims of Ukraine	52,613	0.20	0	1,342	0.01	0	0	New
Fewer Words (SNPU–DSU)	45,155	0.18	0	65,760	0.26	1	1	0
European Choice of Ukraine (LDPU–USDP)	37,118	0.14	0	59,474	0.23	0	0	0
Communist Party (Bolshevik) of Ukraine				17,656	0.07	0	0	New
Women's Party of Ukraine				15,867	0.06	0	0	New
Party of Slavic Unity of Ukraine				12,470	0.05	0	0	0
Organization of Ukrainian Nationalists				1,944	0.01	0	0	0
Party of National Salvation of Ukraine				1,544	0.01	0	0	0
Independents				11,148,333	43.43	111	111	–57
Vacant						5	5	–
Against all	1,396,592	5.42	–	1,915,531	7.46	–	–	–
Total	25,749,574	100.00	225	25,667,167	100.00	225	450	0
Valid votes	25,749,574	96.91		25,667,167	96.60			
Invalid/blank votes	821,699	3.09		904,106	3.40			
Total votes	26,571,273	100.00		26,571,273	100.00			
Registered voters/turnout	37,540,092	70.78		37,540,092	70.78			
Source: Nohlen & Stöver, University of Essex

=== Electoral violations and violence ===
While the United States Commission on Security and Cooperation in Europe, which monitored the election, described the results as generally free and fair, the organisation noted that several instances of violence occurred during the election. These events largely occurred in the Crimean peninsula, located in the southeast of Ukraine, and the southern city of Odesa.

Most notably were events in Crimea, where members of the Crimean Tatar minority (who were being repatriated to Ukraine following their 1944 deportation to Central Asia) were blocked from voting and subjected to violence. At the time of the election, 85,000 (approximately 51.5%) of the 165,000 repatriated Crimean Tatars were non-citizens, with the majority (70,000, or 82.4% of non-citizen Crimean Tatars) of non-citizens being citizens of other Commonwealth of Independent States countries (primarily Uzbekistan). (Note: The remaining 15,000 non-citizen Crimean Tatars were stateless persons, at the time of a 30 March 1998 Organisation for Security and Co-operation in Europe–Parliamentary Assembly of the Council of Europe report.) Prior to the election, the government of Ukraine did not grant permanent residents of Crimea the right to vote regardless of their citizenship status, a measure which had been undertaken in 1994, and the granting of permanent residence status to repatriated Crimean Tatars was only partially performed. Protests by Crimean Tatars occurred, leading to violent clashes with police, after the Verkhovna Rada refused to pass legislation allowing non-citizen Crimean Tatars to vote in parliamentary, regional and local elections. An emergency presidential decree was drafted with provisions allowing for non-citizen Crimean Tatars to vote, but Kuchma ultimately decided not to sign it on 26 March.

Significant electoral violence also occurred in Odesa, where a polarised mayoral election between Eduard Hurvits and Rouslan Bodelan occurred simultaneously with the parliamentary election. Beginning in early 1998, a series of events of electoral violence occurred in the city, including the kidnappings of Leonid Kapeliushnyi, chairman of the Odesa Municipal Electoral Commission, and the chairman of a district electoral commission, as well as an attack on Odesa City Council by an armed militia. Ihor Svoboda, a Hurvits-aligned member of the Odesa Oblast Council notable for his activism against organised crime and drug trafficking, was also kidnapped and presumably killed, and in one instance, a group of local journalists who filmed a campaign rally by Bodelan were later attacked and had their camera film stolen. Bodelan and Hurvits accused each other of responsibility for the attacks, and on the day before the election, a court declared that Hurvits's candidacy was invalid.

Other electoral violations occurred during the election, particularly in the western Zakarpattia and Chernivtsi oblasts, where levels of invalid votes reached 5.9% and 4.9%, respectively. Blank votes reached a high in Sevastopol at 13.1%, in what researchers Peter R. Craumer and James I. Clem describe as likely having been caused by the city's affinity for Russia and dissatisfaction at being part of Ukraine. Mykhailo Brodskyy, a candidate for People's Deputy and mayor of Kyiv, was arrested on 10 March. Brodskyy, who owned the anti-Kuchma Kievskiye Vedomosti, was accused of illegal trade and profits, and the CSCE noted that "critics" had accused police of arresting Brodskyy on politically-motivated charges. Wilson has accused the SDPU(o) of engaging in widespread vote buying in rural Zakarpattia Oblast during the campaign. Following the election, Rukh and the Forward Ukraine alliance announced their intention to challenge election results in courts, citing irregularities.

== Aftermath ==
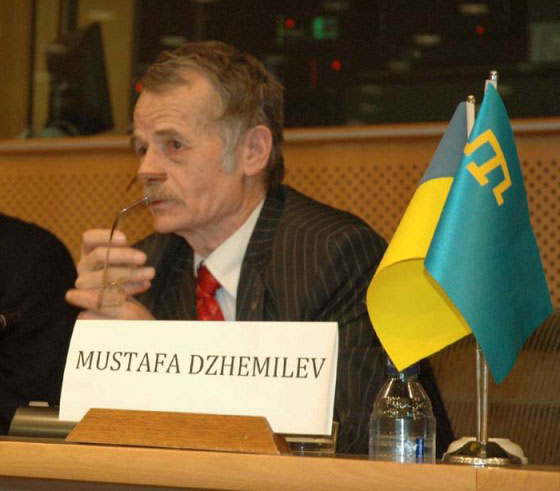
The inclusion of Mustafa Dzhemilev (pictured here in 2010) on Rukh's electoral list led to widespread Crimean Tatar support for the party

Kuchma and Rukh leader Viacheslav Chornovil, as well as other moderate politicians, noted that the results of the election, while a victory for the left, were not the most extensive possible victory. The results were disappointing for Rukh and the national democrats in general, with as they reached only 12.4% (only slightly above national results) in Kyiv, the party's traditional base outside of western Ukraine. Birch and Wilson describe the election as Chornovil's "last hurrah", noting that his romantic nationalism was under pressure from the pragmatism of younger Rukh members such as Oleksandr Lavrynovych and Yuriy Kostenko. The election highlighted problems related to the rights of repatriated Crimean Tatars and the abolition of provisions allowing for them to participate in elections and achieve representation at the regional level. As a result of Rukh advocating for a pro-Crimean Tatar policy and placing civil rights leader Dzhemilev at a high position on their party list, Crimean Tatars largely turned out to vote for Rukh.

A series of under-the-table bargains began in the days and months after the election, with the end result being the expansion of the NDP from its original position of 29 seats to a total of 93 seats. Kuchma's rivals were pushed out of the political scene in the months following the election: following his flight to the United States to escape corruption charges, the Verkhovna Rada voted to lift his parliamentary immunity in February 1999. Following Lazarenko's exile, newspapers published documents alleging that close Kuchma ally Volodymyr Horbulin had formulated a plan for a coordinated campaign against Hromada, utilising tax authorities, the police and the Prosecutor General. Moroz, who had been the sole major politician to vote against lifting Lazarenko's immunity, was subsequently subjected to a campaign of harassment by pro-Kuchma media. The pro-Kuchma parties blocked Moroz's attempts to regain the office of Verkhovna Rada Chairman for a period of nearly four months, with the Rada going through 19 rounds of voting before finally deciding on Oleksandr Tkachenko, a member of the Peasant Party and former Soviet apparatchik, on 7 July 1998. A $70 million loan to an agricultural concern owned by Tkachenko was written off prior to his election as Chairman, leading Wilson to conclude that he was "widely assumed to be in the president's debt".

In December 1998, the Constitutional Court of Ukraine issued a ruling, stating that elected People's Deputies could freely choose their party affiliation, rather than being constrained to the eight elected proportional representation parties. The NDP, buckling under the weight of its greatly-expanded membership, soon fractured into several parties, as did Hromada; they were later joined by the SPU–SelPU and, eventually, Rukh, which broke into two factions shortly before Chornovil's sudden death in March 1999.
