= Valentyn Zghursky =

Soviet-Ukrainian politician (1927–2014)

- Валентин Згурський

Head of the Executive Committee of the Kyiv City Council
- In office November 1, 1979 – January 17, 1990
- Preceded by: Volodymyr Husiev
- Succeeded by: Mykola Lavrukhin (Head of the Executive Committee of the Kyiv City Council) and Arnold Nazarchuk (Head of the Kyiv City Council)

Personal details
- Born: February 9, 1927 Birzula, Moldavian ASSR, Ukrainian SSR, Soviet Union
- Died: October 24, 2014 (aged 87) Kyiv, Ukraine
- Party: Communist Party of the Soviet Union
- Education: Kyiv Polytechnic Institute
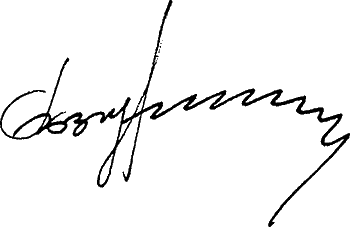
- Signature

Valentyn Arsentiyovych Zghursky (Ukrainian: Валентин Арсентійович Згурський) was a head of the executive committee of the Kyiv City Council.

== Biography ==
During World War II as a teenager he worked on Soviet railways. After graduating the Kyiv Polytechnic Institute in 1954 as an electrical engineer, in 1950s-1970s Zghursky worked at the Soviet Defense company "Radiopribor" (Radio Instrument) in Kyiv making there a career and eventually becoming its general director (1973-1979). Radiopribor was also known as the Korolyov Production Union.

After dissolution of the Soviet Union, Radiopribor was transformed into a Meridian Factory in 1994.

== Honours and awards ==
- Hero of Socialist Labour (1981)
- Order of Lenin (1981, 1986)
- Order of the Red Banner of Labour (1966, 1971)
- Order of the October Revolution (1976)
- Order of the Patriotic War (1985, 1st class)
- Order of Bohdan Khmelnytsky (2000, 3rd class)
- Order of Prince Yaroslav the Wise (2007, 5th class)
- Order of Merit (1997, 3rd class)
- Order for Courage (1999, 3rd class)
- State Prize of Ukraine in Science and Technology

== See also ==
- Viktor Medvedchuk
- Hryhoriy Surkis
- Ihor Surkis
- Kyiv Seven
