= Potimkov =

Potimkov (Russian: Потимков, Ukrainian: Потімков) or female form Potimkova (Russian: Потимкова, Ukrainian: Потімкова) is a surname of Slavic-language origin. Notable people with this surname include:

- Serhiy Potimkov (1954 - 2025), Ukrainian politician
- Yuriy Potimkov (born 2002), Ukrainian footballer
