= Akahoshi =

Akahoshi (written: 赤星 lit. "red star") is a Japanese surname. Notable people with the surname include:

- Iris Akahoshi (1929–1987), Czechoslovak-American human rights activist
- Norihiro Akahoshi (赤星 憲広; born 1976), Japanese baseball player
- Takafumi Akahoshi (赤星 貴文; born 1986), Japanese footballer
- Taku Akahoshi (赤星 拓; born 1984), Japanese footballer
- Yuji Akahoshi (赤星 優志; born 1999), Japanese baseball player
