= Synod of Lviv (1946) =

Synod merging Ukrainian and Russian churches

- Part of the Russification of Ukraine and persecution of Christians in the Soviet Union
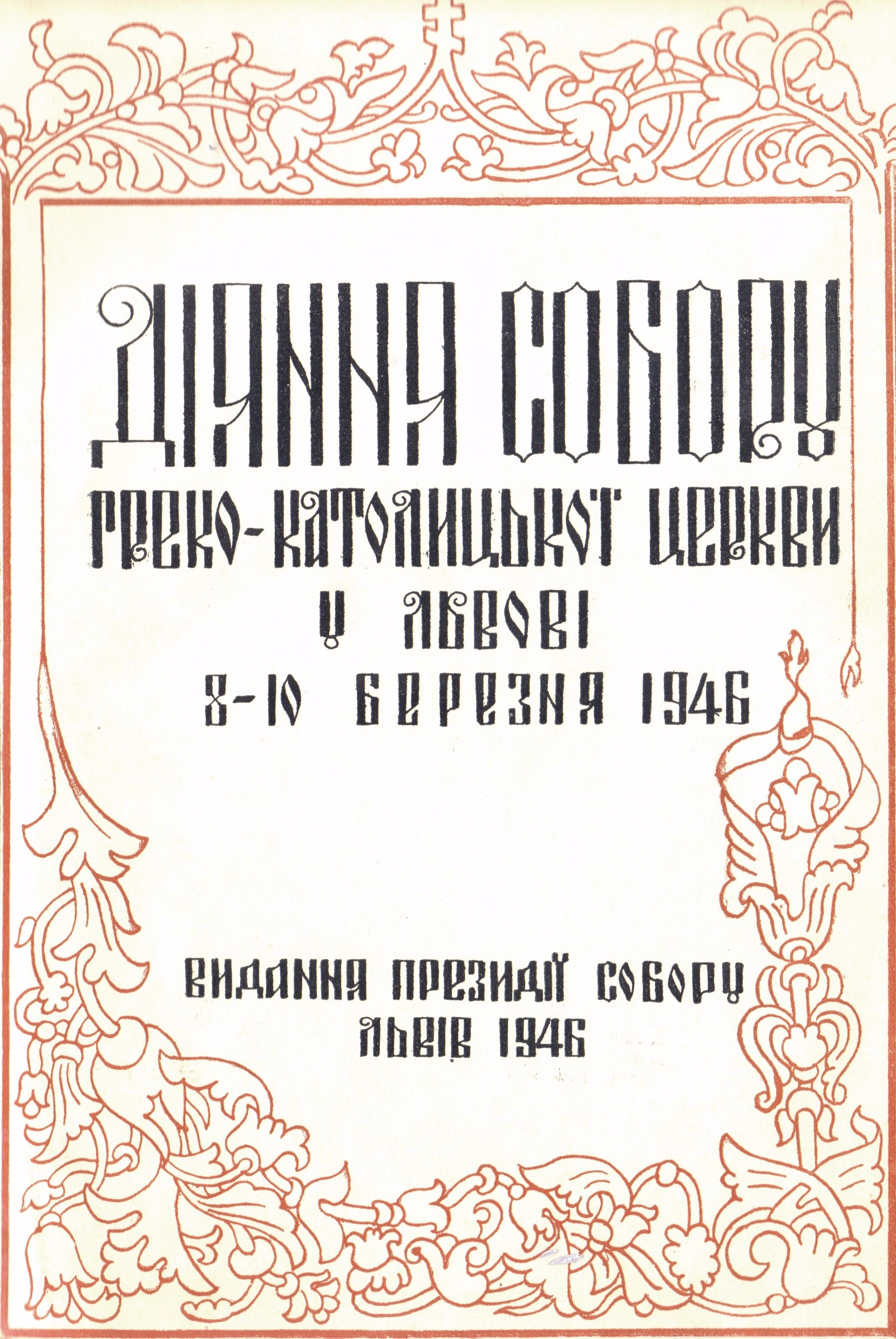
- Native name: Львівський собор
- Date: 8–10 March 1946
- Location: St. George's Cathedral, Lviv, Ukrainian Soviet Socialist Republic, Soviet Union
- Target: Ukrainian Greek Catholic Church
- Perpetrators: Government of the Soviet Union (People's Commissariat for State Security); Russian Orthodox Church; Havriyl Kostelnyk; Michael Melnyk; Anthony Pelvetskyi
- Outcome: Nullification of the 1596 Union of Brest; Ukrainian Greek Catholic Church forced underground

The Synod of Lviv (Note: Referred to by detractors as the "pseudo-synod" (Ukrainian: псевдосинод, romanized: psevdosynod).) or the Council of Lviv (Ukrainian: Львівський собор, romanized: Lvivskyi sobor; Russian: Львовский собор, romanized: Lvovsky sobor) was a March 1946 synod of the Ukrainian Greek Catholic Church that declared the 1596 Union of Brest to be annulled, thereby unifying the church with the Russian Orthodox Church. Held amidst a climate of repression by the Soviet government, the synod was rejected by the majority of the church's adherents, leading them to continue their practices underground until their activity was again legalised under Mikhail Gorbachev's policy of Glasnost.

The Soviet government had begun plans to forcibly dismantle the UGCC following their invasion of eastern Poland (present-day western Ukraine), although they were put on hold due to, among other reasons, Operation Barbarossa. With the region's recapture in 1944, the process was soon restarted in response to the UGCC's support for anti-communist Ukrainian nationalists, and the church's leadership was arrested. An organisation of three Catholic priests known as the Sponsoring Group was created in May 1945, and, with the support of the NKGB and Russian Orthodox Church, successfully pushed for the unification of the UGCC into the Russian Orthodox Church. The process was formalised by a March 1946 synod. As a result of the synod, the UGCC became the largest illegal religious organisation in the world, and followers were subject to persecution for over forty years until they were permitted to practice their faith in 1989, after a long-running campaign by Ukrainian Soviet dissidents.

== Background ==
By the mid-20th century, the Ukrainian Greek Catholic Church contained over 3,000 parishes, 4,440 churches, five seminaries, and 127 monasteries. The leading religion among ethnic Ukrainians in Austro-Hungarian Galicia, the UGCC was at the heart of the Ukrainian national revival. Centred in Lviv, their role in advocating Ukrainian independence increased after Andrey Sheptytsky became Major Archbishop of Kyiv–Galicia in 1901, as the church became among the foremost advocates of Ukrainian autonomy and independence.

Following the Soviet invasion of Poland at the beginning of World War II, areas of western Ukraine where the majority of the local population belonged to the Ukrainian Greek Catholic Church were placed under the control of the Soviet Union. Repressions by the Soviet government against members of the church and its clergy soon began, and in January 1941, Soviet leader Joseph Stalin and head of the NKVD Lavrentiy Beria approved a proposal to destroy the church. However, such a decision was politically untenable due to geographic proximity to the German-controlled General Government and unity between members of the church at the time. The beginning of Operation Barbarossa led to plans for the Greek Catholic Church's destruction being put on hold indefinitely.

With the Soviet recapture of western Ukraine in 1944, it at first appeared that there would be peace between the Soviet government and the UGCC. Sheptytsky's death the same year was marked by a lavish funeral, and the succession of Josyf Slipyj was noted in the Soviet press. In December, a group from the UGCC travelled to Moscow, the Soviet capital, where they met with the government and the Russian Orthodox Church. Behind this new cordiality, however, the church was far weaker than it had been before Germany's invasion of the Soviet Union: Sheptytsky's death had left the UGCC without a unifying figurehead, and the church's support for anti-communist groups such as the Ukrainian Insurgent Army had left their clergy vulnerable to treason charges. In 1945, after the church's leadership refused to denounce Ukrainian independence and join Soviet propaganda efforts, a purge of clergy began, with those deemed who opposed the concept of a UGCC-ROC merger being deported to Siberia and replaced by individuals who were more willing to support the Soviet government. These replacements were not recognised by the Holy See, which holds authority over appointments in the church. By February 1945, the People's Commissariat for State Security (NKGB) of the Ukrainian Soviet Socialist Republic had issued a goal for officers to liquidate the church, citing its ties to the Holy See and Ukrainian nationalist groups. The written report said, in part, "The Greek Catholic Uniate Church, in the form that it exists in at the present time, is an entirely foreign to us in influence, as a legal residence of the Vatican, and in its active participation in Ukrainian nationalist organisations on our territory."

== Timeline ==
=== Mass arrests ===
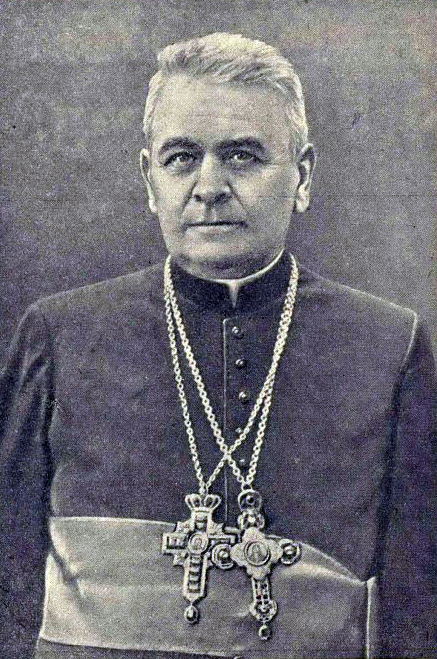
Havriyl Kostelnyk, chairman of the Sponsoring Group and the UGCC priest who oversaw the synod

Beginning in the spring of 1945 a series of articles and pamphlets by writer Yaroslav Halan accused the church of collective responsibility for subversion against the Soviet government. On 11 April Slipyj, along with four bishops (Note: Hryhoriy Khomyshyn, Nicholas Charnetsky, Nykyta Budka, and Ivan Lyatyshevskyi.) were arrested, later being sent into exile throughout the Soviet Union. The arrests resulted in a dramatic decline in the activity of the UGCC: the Greek Catholic Theological Academy was closed, as were several seminaries and deacons' schools. The Russian Orthodox Church was depicted in government propaganda as the progressive force compared to the reactionary UGCC, with its loyalty to the Soviet government during the war and its role in uniting all East Slavs under a single Russian nation being particularly noted.

A month following the arrests, on 28 May, a group known as the Sponsoring Group for the Re-Union of the Greek Catholic Church with the Russian Orthodox Church was established. The Sponsoring Group had three members: Havriyl Kostelnyk, the chairman, was based in Lviv and had an established reputation within the UGCC as a critic of the Holy See. Michael Melnyk was vicar-general of Archeparchy of Przemyśl, and Anthony Pelvetskyi was a dean in the Archeparchy of Stanyslaviv. The three received assistance from Macarius Oksiyuk, the newly minted Russian Orthodox bishop of western Ukraine. Claiming itself to be the legitimate leadership of the UGCC, the Sponsoring Group was publicly rejected in a letter by 300 priests, but found support from the government. On the day of their establishment, they submitted a petition to the government of the Ukrainian SSR requesting that they be permitted to start the process of integration with the Russian Orthodox Church. Their petition was approved on 18 June 1945 in a ruling that recognised them as the sole governing body of the UGCC. Members of the church were subsequently mailed fliers calling on them to support the unification of the churches in order to fight Polonisation and "the greatest enemy of the Rus' - Rome," and were specifically instructed to pay no attention to the recent arrests of clergy.

The arguments of the Sponsoring Group in favour of unifying the churches was based largely on pragmatism, and they felt that it was necessary to accept political realities in order to move forward. They additionally capitalised on opposition to liturgical Latinisation within the UGCC. Priests who were not already swayed by the Sponsoring Group's reasoning were subject to a campaign of death threats, internal exile, or Gulag sentences from the government. In a further move to reduce the number of dissenting voices in the church, the Sponsoring Group reorganised the church's deaneries, under the pretext that they were complying with the new administrative divisions of the Soviet government. These deaneries were staffed exclusively by those that supported the integration of the churches. By March 1946 a total of 986 priests, more than half of the Catholic clergy, had come out in support of unification. Only 281 priests opposed to the union remained at their posts, having not been deported, imprisoned, or forced into hiding.

=== The synod ===
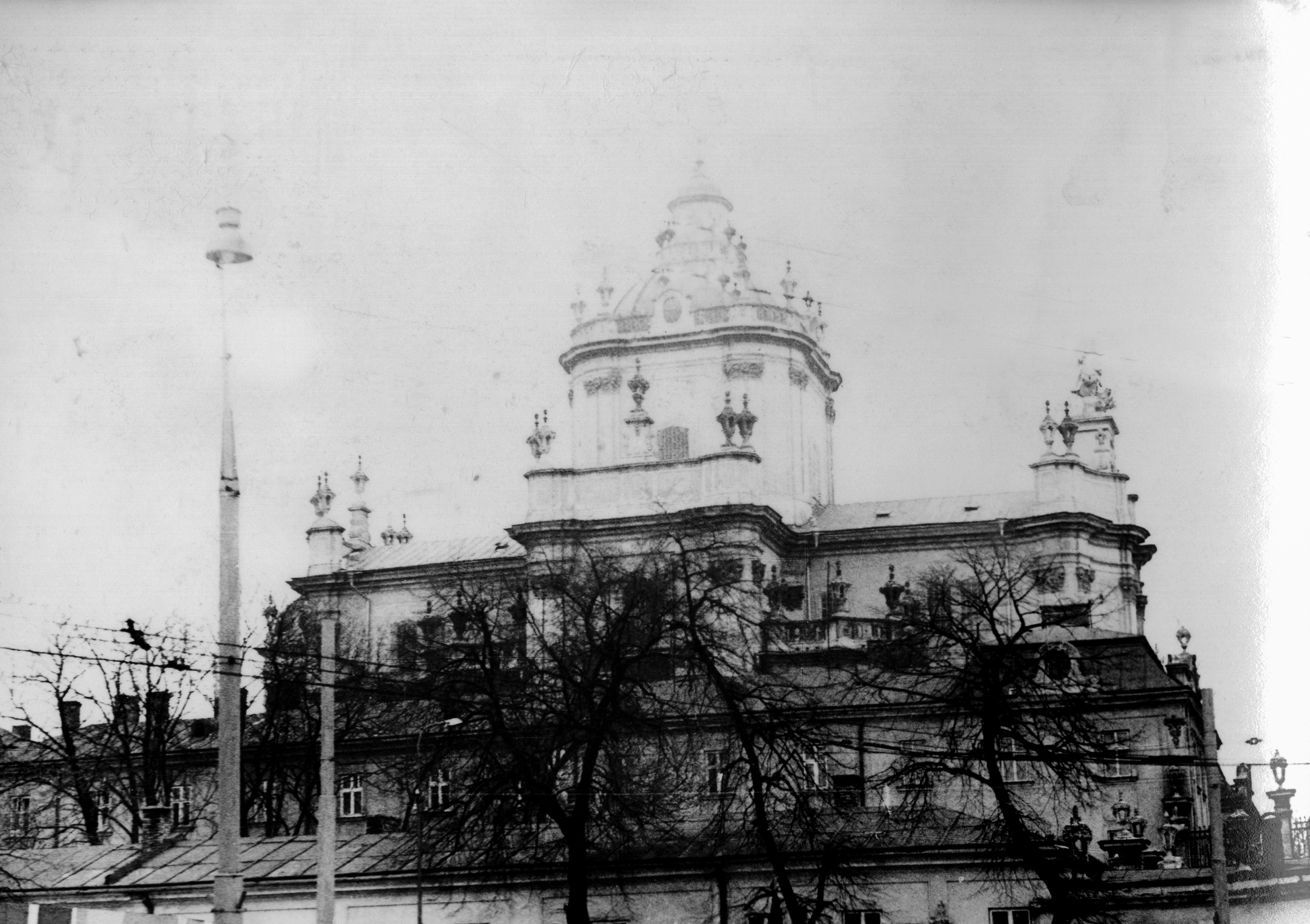
St. George's Cathedral, Lviv (pictured here in 1976) was the site of the synod

In February 1946, the NKGB of Ukraine dispatched lieutenant general P. Drozdetskyi to oversee the synod. The same month, the process of selecting candidates for attendance began. As the Soviet government sought to present an image of adequately representing western Ukraine, it was determined that there should be 216 individuals in attendance, equal to two people per deanery. 140 participants, equal to two-thirds of synod attendees, were NKGB agents. Several candidates proposed by the Sponsoring Group failed to pass loyalty tests, and all those present, including the NKGB agents, had corresponding reference documents with which to determine their attitude towards the unification of the churches.

The synod began on 8 March 1946 at St. George's Cathedral in Lviv. The first speaker was father Vasyl Lesiuk, who unexpectedly expressed his support for subsequent meetings between attendants and parishioners with which to gauge the best choice for the future of the UGCC. Midway through his speech, he was forcibly prevented from continuing by the NKGB, and Kostelnyk was rushed on stage. During his speech, he openly declared the intention of the synod was to formalise a union with the Russian Orthodox Church. Lesiuk was arrested following the incident, and further proceedings continued smoothly. That day, a resolution was unanimously adopted calling to "reject the resolutions of the 1596 Union of Brest, to abolish the Uniate church, to separate from the Vatican, and to return to our father's holy Orthodox faith - the Russian Orthodox Church." Telegrams, pre-written by the NKGB, were sent to Stalin, First Secretary of the Communist Party of Ukraine Nikita Khrushchev, Chairman of the Supreme Soviet of Ukraine Mykhailo Hrechukha, and Patriarch Alexy I of Moscow the next day. On 10 March 1946, the first Sunday of Lent and the 350th anniversary of the Union of Brest, the synod was formalised. Clergy were required to formally petition the Russian Orthodox Church to retain their roles in the new order under the threat of expulsion from their respective parishes.

=== Aftermath ===
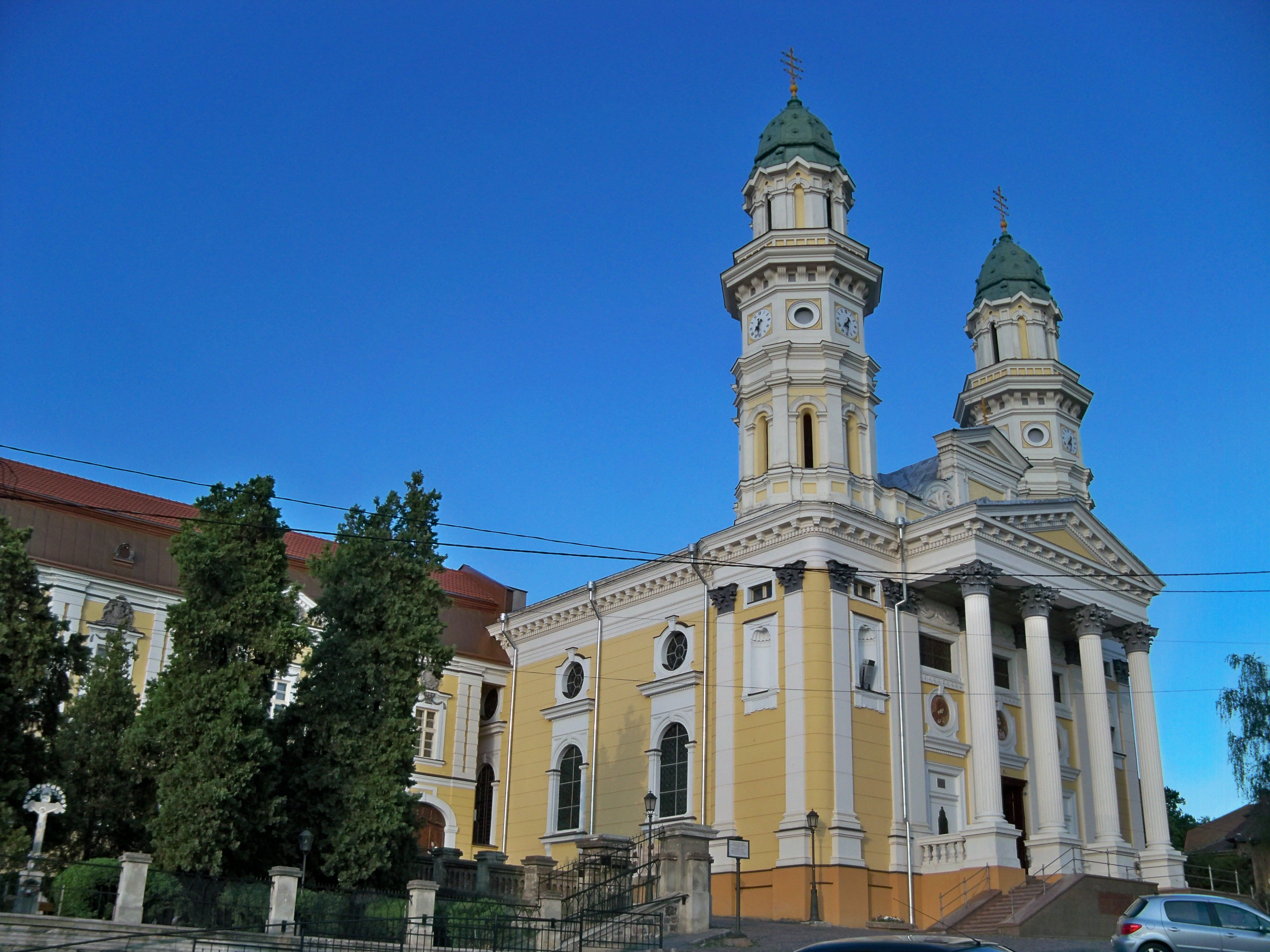
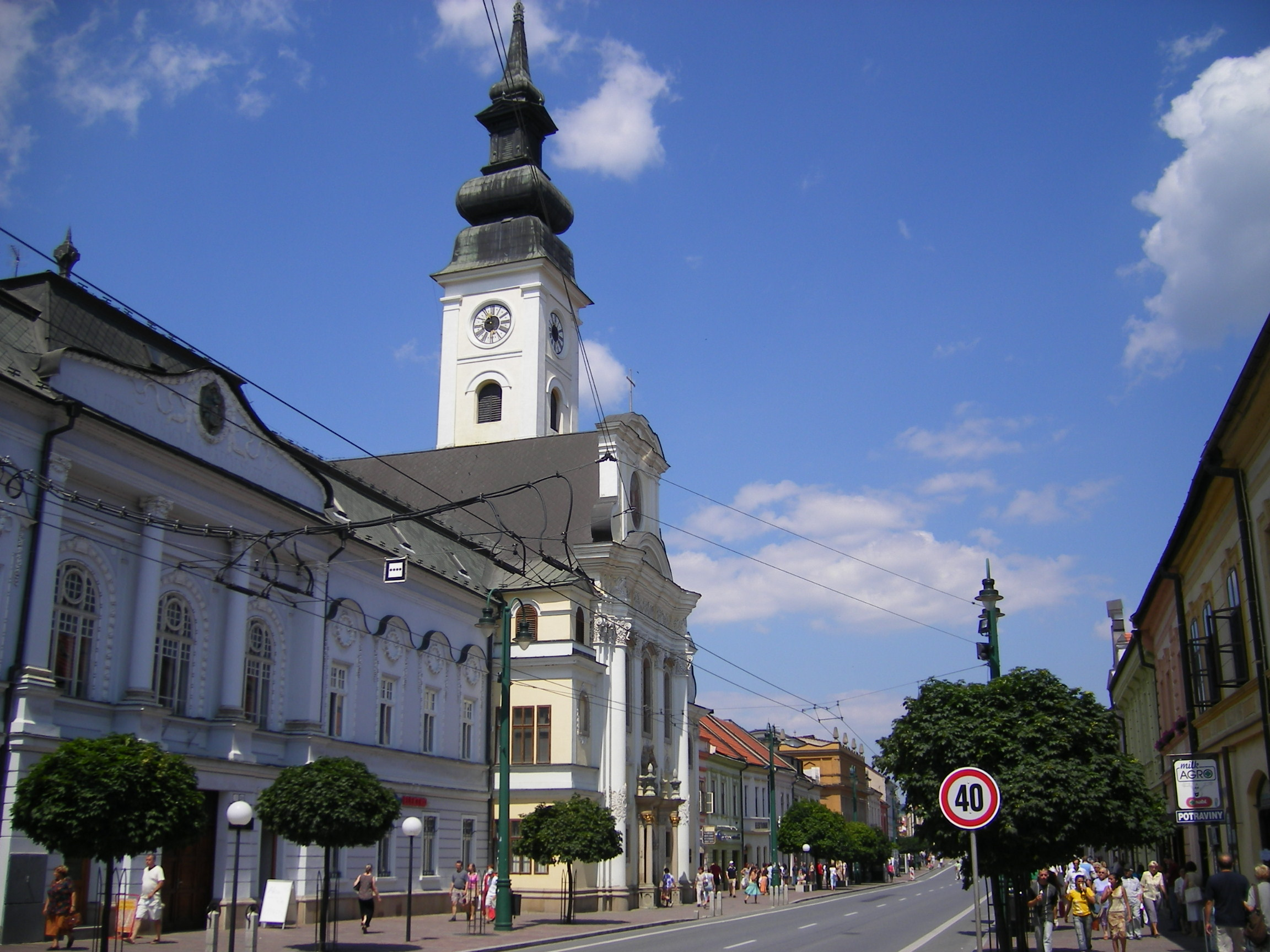
The Ruthenian Greek Catholic Church (then based in Uzhhorod, on left) and the Slovak Greek Catholic Church (based in Prešov, on right) were both later merged into the Russian Orthodox Church in procedures based on the Synod of Lviv

The Synod of Lviv made the Ukrainian Greek Catholic Church the largest illegal religious organisation in the world. Several priests who had participated in the synod, or had been alleged to have been in the synod, soon renounced it: father Mykhailo Lishchynskyi, whose name had been included in the lists of priests present, said in a letter to Macarius following the publication of lists that he remained a Catholic. Father Vasyl Baran, meanwhile, in 1948 announced that he was splitting off from the Russian Orthodox Church. Both were removed from the church in response; Lishchynskyi worked as an accountant in Lviv, while Baran was arrested in 1950. The synod also served as a basis for later synods targeting the Greek Catholics. The first, held in Uzhhorod in 1948, was directed against the Ruthenian Greek Catholic Church, while the second, held in 1950, brought the Slovak Greek Catholic Church into the fold.

Two of the Sponsoring Group's three members died shortly after the synod under unclear circumstances. Kostelnyk was shot to death while leaving the Church of Transfiguration in Lviv in 1948, in what was officially blamed on the Organisation of Ukrainian Nationalists, although debates continue as to the possible involvement of the NKGB. Melnyk died in 1950 after being poisoned during a trip to Leningrad as part of his duties. Even after the synod, the process of transferring former UGCC churches to the Russian Orthodox Church took until 1949.

== Legacy ==
While the Synod failed to lead the destruction of the UGCC as intended, it forced the church's followers underground. Slipyj, the church's legal leader, remained in Soviet prison camps for 18 years until being deported from the Soviet Union in 1963. Services and seminaries were conducted in homes or in forests, and were colloquially referred to as being "in the catacombs" by adherents.

Ukrainian Soviet dissidents actively protested for the Soviet government to end its recognition of the Synod of Lviv and again allow the UGCC to operate. Several prominent dissidents, such as Viacheslav Chornovil, Zenovii Krasivskyi, and Olena Antoniv, supported the legalisation of the UGCC, and Chornovil organised several large rallies in Lviv calling for the church's unbanning between 1988 and 1989 as part of the leadup to the 1989–1991 Ukrainian revolution.

Subsequently, with protests led by Chornovil, the UGCC also announced it was going to operate openly, in defiance of Soviet law. During celebrations of the 1000th anniversary of the Christianization of Rus' and Taras Shevchenko's 175th birth anniversary, thousands of Catholics openly participated in open-air services, and 120,000 signatures were collected for a petition to Soviet leader Mikhail Gorbachev to unban the church. A hunger strike by Catholic priests on the Arbat in Moscow drew additional attention, both domestic and international to the issue, and the Soviet government was soon forced to relent under pressure from its own citizens and an organised international campaign to distribute Catholic publications in Ukraine. The Council of Ministers of the Ukrainian SSR issued a statement on 28 November 1989, ahead of a meeting between Gorbachev and Pope John Paul II, stating that members of the UGCC were to be granted equal rights to practice their religion openly.
