= Olena Antoniv =

Ukrainian Soviet dissident and human rights activist (1937–1986)

- Олена Антонів
- Born: 17 November 1937; Bóbrka, Poland (now Bibrka, Ukraine)
- Died: 2 February 1986 (aged 48); Lviv, Ukrainian SSR, Soviet Union (now Ukraine)
- Education: Lviv Medical University
- Known for: Human rights activism
- Spouses: Viacheslav Chornovil (m. 1963, divorced) Zenovii Krasivskyi (m. 1978)
- Children: Taras Chornovil

Olena Tymofiivna Antoniv (Ukrainian: Олена Тимофіївна Антонів; 17 November 1937 – 2 February 1986) was a Ukrainian Soviet dissident and human rights activist. She was the wife of both Viacheslav Chornovil and Zenovii Krasivskyi, and the mother of Taras Chornovil.

== Early life and career ==
Antoniv was born on 17 November 1937 in the village of Bibrka, then within the Second Polish Republic. Antoniv grew up in a family of nationally conscious Ukrainians who had funded the Ukrainian Sich Riflemen. Moved by the stories of Ukrainians tortured by the Soviet secret police in Lviv, Antoniv chose to undergo an underground independent education, and additionally attended secret services of the Ukrainian Greek Catholic Church after it was banned and forcibly merged into the Russian Orthodox Church. From 1955 to 1961, she studied at Lviv Medical University, and following her graduated she worked in the Lviv Oblast tuberculosis hospital.

== Dissident activities ==
During the Khrushchev Thaw Antoniv was a member of the Sixtiers, and she joined the Artistic Youths' Club. At this time, she was also close to a former classmate, Iryna Burynets, and became acquainted with Burynets's husband, journalist Viacheslav Chornovil. Following the couple's divorce, Antoniv married Chornovil in 1963. The two had one son, Taras. The two had what was described by Taras as a "difficult" divorce soon after marrying, and Antoniv continued to raise Taras in Lviv. During this time, she first met Zenovii Krasivskyi as part of her efforts to support political prisoners from the Ukrainian National Front.

Antoniv was arrested during the 1972–1973 Ukrainian purge after organising Vertep and Koliada celebrations from her Lviv flat. Unlike most others, she was quickly released, and, along with other women (such as Oksana Meshko, Raisa Rudenko, Vira Lisova Nadiya Svitlychna, Mykhailyna Kotsiubynska, and Raisa Moroz played a critical role in maintaining the dissident movement while most of its leaders were imprisoned.

After Krasivskyi's 1978 release, Antoniv married him. The marriage was supported by Taras Chornovil and permitted by the Soviet state, despite laws against people who were regarded as mentally ill from being married (Krasivskyi had been a victim of punitive psychiatry declaring him mentally ill). After Krasivskyi was again arrested in 1980, Antoniv was subject to death threats by the Soviet government, but it only brought her to be more active in her human rights activism. Despite not being an official member of the Ukrainian Helsinki Group, she prepared multiple documents for the organisation and delivered the group's documents to foreign journalists in Moscow. She additionally spent many of her remaining years in Tyumen Oblast, where Krasivskyi was imprisoned. With the beginning of Mikhail Gorbachev's policy of Perestroika, Antoniv sought to campaign for the legalisation of the Greek Catholic Church.

== Death ==
Antoniv died on 2 February 1986 after being hit by a lorry in Lviv. Prior to her death, she, along with Krasivskyi, had been on the way to a birthday party for Raisa Moroz when Antoniv got out of the vehicle to buy flowers.

Shortly after Antoniv's death, exiled dissidents Sviatoslav Karavanskyi and Nina Strokata Karavanska published an article in the Anti-Bolshevik Bloc of Nations Correspondence accusing the Soviet government of masterminding it, further noting that it took place two days prior to another car crash which killed Juozas Zdebskis, a Lithuanian Catholic priest and Soviet dissident.
