= Dnipropetrovsk Mafia =

Oligarchic clique in the Soviet Union and Ukraine

Dniepropetrovsk Clan
- Ethnicity: Ukrainians, Ukrainian Jews
- Leaders: Ihor Kolomoyskyi, Oleksandr Turchynov,
- Activities: Corruption, state capture, drug trafficking, scamming, prostitution, pornography, human trafficking, white-collar crime
- Allies: Azov Brigade, Aidar Battalion
- Rivals: Donetsk Clan, Kyiv Seven

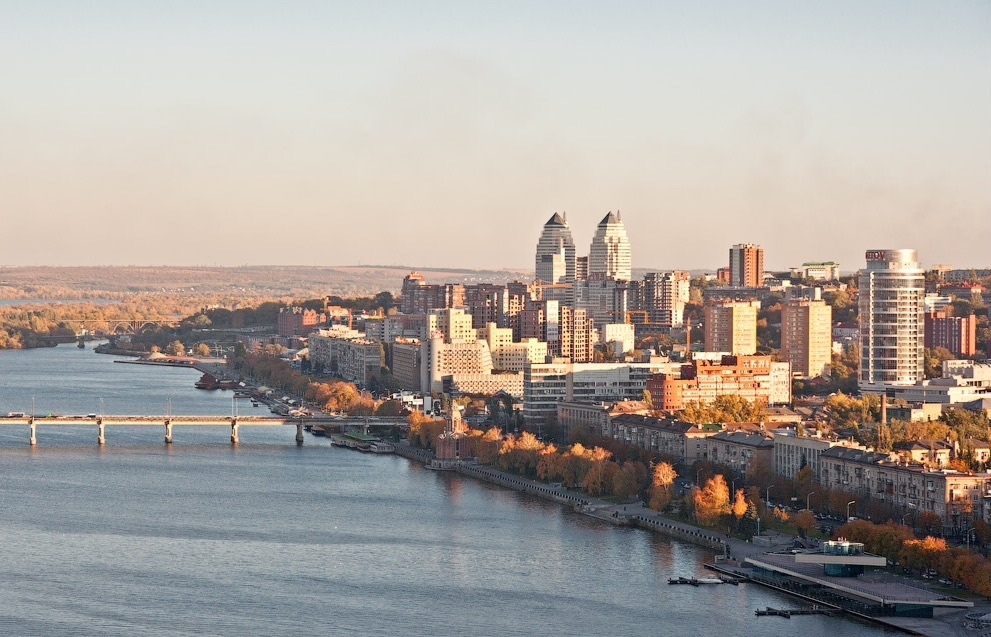
Dnipro (formerly Dnipropetrovsk) in 2015

The Dnipropetrovsk mafia, also known as the Dnipropetrovsk clan (Ukrainian: Дніпропетровський клан, romanized: Dnipropetrovskyi klan; Russian: Днепропетровский клан, romanized: Dnepropetrovskiy klan) or simply Dnipropetrovtsi (Ukrainian: дніпропетровці, lit. 'Dnipropetrovsk people'), is a group of Ukrainian oligarchs, politicians, and organised crime figures, and formerly Soviet politicians. While two separate groups, both iterations of the Dnipropetrovsk Mafia have been linked by their powerful influence on Ukraine and base in the eastern Ukrainian city of Dnipro (formerly Dnipropetrovsk).

== Origins ==
The Dnipropetrovsk Mafia first emerged in the aftermath of the Great Purge, as regional structures of the Communist Party of the Soviet Union were re-established in Dnipropetrovsk Oblast. Later, in the aftermath of World War II, as power structures were again rebuilt in the 1950s and 1960s, the Dnipropetrovsk Mafia was firmly established, comprising the close allies of Leonid Brezhnev in his political activities in Dnipropetrovsk Oblast and the city of Dnipropetrovsk (now Dnipro).

After World War II, Dnipropetrovsk was a closed city, with foreign visitors being barred from entry. This status was due to the city's importance in the Soviet nuclear weapons programme; Pivdenmash (Ukrainian: Південмаш; Russian: Южмаш, romanized: Yuzhmash), based in Dnipropetrovsk, was at the time the top producer of intercontinental ballistic missiles in the world. Pivdenmash also later grew to cover civilian rocketry, playing a critical role in the Soviet space programme. Dnipropetrovsk's position as a closed city also led to the growth of a flourishing black market, which involved many members of the post-Soviet Dnipropetrovsk Mafia, among them Ihor Kolomoyskyi and Gennadiy Bogolyubov.

== Under Brezhnev ==
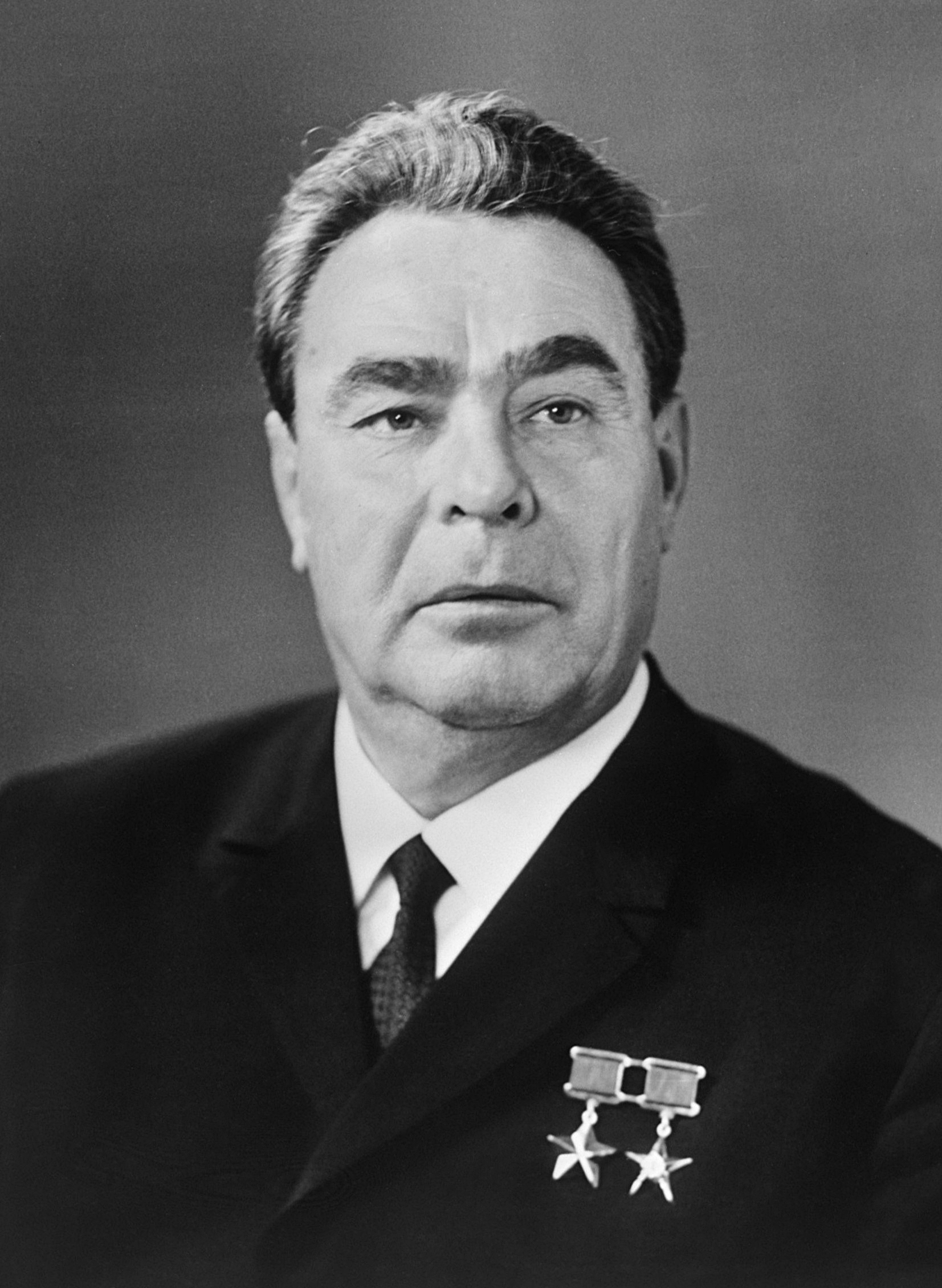
Leonid Brezhnev, leader of the Dnipropetrovsk Mafia and General Secretary of the Communist Party of the Soviet Union (1964–1982)

The Dnipropetrovsk Mafia was the name given to an informal group of Soviet politicians who held high office while Leonid Brezhnev was First Secretary or General Secretary of the Communist Party of the Soviet Union (CPSU) in 1964–82, whom he knew from his time as a provincial party official in 1946–56.

The group took its name from the Dnipropetrovsk region of Ukraine, where Leonid Brezhnev began his political career after graduating from the Dnipropetrovsk Metallurgical Institute. He was First Secretary of the Zaporizhzhia Oblast regional party committee in 1946–48, the Dnipropetrovsk party committee in 1948–50, and the Central Committee of the Communist Party of Moldavia in 1950–52. Most members of the 'mafia' were pensioned off – or, in a few cases, arrested – either soon after Brezhnev died, in 1982, or when Mikhail Gorbachev took over as General Secretary of the CPSU in 1985.

=== Members ===
- Leonid Brezhnev, General-Secretary of the Communist Party 1964–1982.
- Konstantin Chernenko, General-Secretary of the Communist Party following Yuri Andropov's death, 1984–1985.
- Nikolai Tikhonov, Premier of the Soviet Union 1980–1985.
- Andrei Kirilenko, Secretary of the CPSU Central Committee 1966–76.
- Volodymyr Shcherbytsky, First Secretary of the Communist Party of Ukraine 1972–89.
- Viktor Chebrikov, Deputy Chairman of the KGB 1968–82, Chairman of the KGB 1982–1988.
- Semyon Tsvigun, First Deputy Chairman of the KGB 1967–1982.
- Nikolai Shchelokov, Minister of Interior 1966–1982.

== In post-independence Ukraine ==
Leaders of the Dnipropetrovsk Mafia in the 1990s

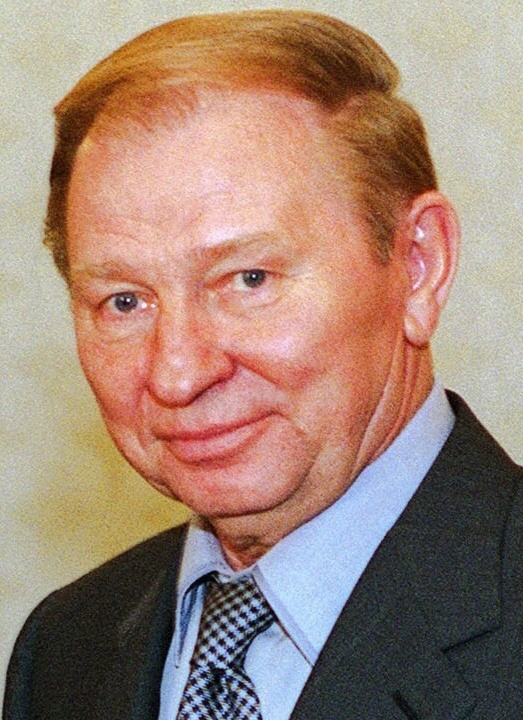
Leonid Kuchma, originally leader of the Dnipropetrovsk Mafia, later President of Ukraine

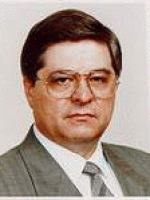
Pavlo Lazarenko, Kuchma's successor as Dnipropetrovsk Mafia leader, Prime Minister of Ukraine

However, the Dnipropetrovsk Mafia survived the post-Brezhnev period, and, after the Declaration of Independence of Ukraine, returned to the forefront of Ukrainian politics. Under President Leonid Kravchuk, the Dnipropetrovsk Mafia held the premiership from 1992 to 1993 under Leonid Kuchma. Kuchma's rule was preceded by Vitold Fokin, as well as succeeded in an acting capacity by Yukhym Zvyahilsky, both of whom were members of the Donetsk Clan. These events precipitated the conflict between the Dnipropetrovsk Mafia, led by Kuchma, and the Donetsk Clan, led by Zvyahilsky.

By the 1990s, Kuchma had taken on the same role as Brezhnev and Shcherbytsky as leader of the Dnipropetrovsk Mafia. This status was owed in part due to his role as former head of Pivdenmash, as well as his Dnipropetrovsk origins, in contrast with Fokin, Zvyahilsky, and Vitaliy Masol, all of whom had political roots in the Donbas region.

When Kuchma was first elected as president in the 1994 Ukrainian presidential election, he appointed close friends and political allies from Dnipropetrovsk to positions within the government. According to a 2002 report by the Federal Bureau of Investigation, Kuchma appointed over 200 Dnipropetrovsk residents to government positions, awarding an additional 55 high-ranking positions. By 1996, however, this had become something of a liability, with bitter infighting among these individuals. Following the resignation of Yevhen Marchuk as Prime Minister, Kuchma appointed Pavlo Lazarenko, a leading member of the Dnipropetrovsk Mafia and First Deputy Prime Minister, to the premiership.

Prior to his appointment, Lazarenko had been Governor of Dnipropetrovsk Oblast from 1992 to 1995. There, he had established a reputation for himself, both as a qualified economist who had accomplished remarkable short-term growth and as a powerful ruler who effectively controlled the Ukrainian mafia in the Oblast. These events had together formed a public opinion of Lazarenko as a strict but fair leader. However, economic forecasts for 1995 onwards projected an economic downturn in Dnipropetrovsk Oblast. Seeking to preserve his career, Lazarenko quickly moved from regional to national politics, and was brought into the Government of Ukraine by Kuchma as a third competitor between Marchuk and Viktor Pynzenyk, who both presented differing views on necessary economic reforms. Rather than competing with Marchuk, however, Lazarenko painted himself as his ally while simultaneously preparing for his own political rise.

Once in the premiership, Lazarenko at first was supported by both Kuchma and Oleksandr Moroz, leader of the Socialist Party of Ukraine, who hoped Lazarenko would divide Kuchma's allies. However, things did not go as Moroz anticipated: the adoption of the Constitution of Ukraine, granting increased powers to the presidency over the Verkhovna Rada (parliament of Ukraine) was supported by Lazarenko and other supporters of Kuchma, while Moroz, on the other hand, opposed the amendments. In return for this support, Kuchma granted Lazarenko sweeping powers after the constitution was passed.

With these powers, Lazarenko brought his own allies to Kyiv from Dnipropetrovsk Oblast, and began appointing them as ministers and governors. The dismissal of Volodymyr Shcherban as Governor of Donetsk Oblast led to protests by the Donetsk Clan, and Lazarenko's calls for the Pavlohrad-born Yuriy Poliakov led to the beginning of open conflict between the two groups. On 16 July 1996, a bomb exploded next to Lazarenko's motorcade while he was driving to Boryspil International Airport.

=== Kuchma-Lazarenko conflict ===
By 1997, Lazarenko's power had reached its zenith. The Donetsk Clan's leadership had been eliminated by the gang war, including People's Deputy Yevhen Shcherban (unrelated to Volodymyr Shcherban) and businessman Oleksandr Momot. However, this success did not last for long, as Lazarenko soon drew Kuchma's ire. Lazarenko was removed, and forced to flee the country. Despite an attempt to further his political career by founding the Hromada political party, he found little political success after the 1998 Ukrainian parliamentary election and was later arrested in the United States. Kuchma's efforts to stamp out Lazarenko were supported by both the remnants of the Donetsk clan and the Kyiv clan, another oligarch group.

=== After Lazarenko ===
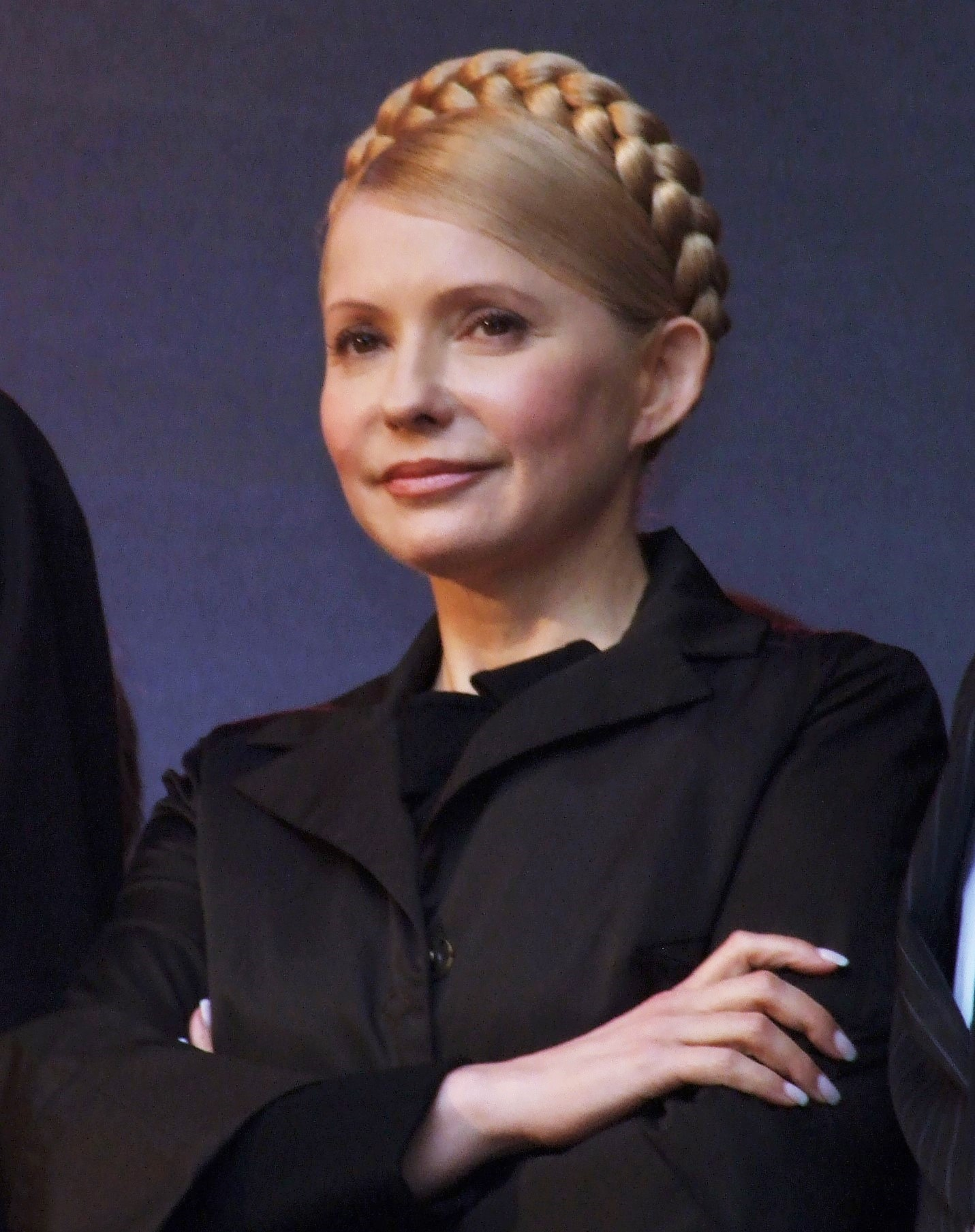
Yulia Tymoshenko (pictured here in 2010), a close follower of Lazarenko, became one of the leaders of the Dnipropetrovsk Mafia after the latter's flight from Ukraine.

Following Lazarenko's defeat, Kuchma became an arbiter between inter-clan disputes, and the Dnipropetrovsk Mafia broke into various factions. At the time of the 2004 Ukrainian presidential election, the two largest factions of the Dnipropetrovsk Mafia were the so-called "Interpipe Faction" led by Kuchma's son-in-law Victor Pinchuk, and Privat Group, led by oligarch Ihor Kolomoyskyi. Kuchma, marred by the Cassette Scandal as well as questions surrounding his sale of missiles to Iraq, pushed the clan to support Viktor Yanukovych of the Donetsk clan after being pressured by the Donetsk clan's leader, Rinat Akhmetov.

However, ultimately neither Pinchuk nor Kolomoyskyi were able to consolidate control over the clan. A third group, descended from Lazarenko's and led by Yulia Tymoshenko, took control after the presidential election, Orange Revolution, and Kuchma's resignation from politics. During the 2010 Ukrainian presidential election, she faced off against Yanukovych. However, Ukrainian political commentator Denys Kazanskyi has rejected the idea that the 2010 presidential election was simply another clash between the Donetsk and Dnipropetrovsk clans, citing the involvement of groups from throughout the entire country.

=== Since Euromaidan ===
Following Euromaidan and the Revolution of Dignity, the political clan system in Ukraine ended with the cementing of the government as the primary source of authority. Despite this, however, the Dnipropetrovsk Mafia endured, in contrast to the Donetsk and Kyiv clans, which both died out. This was in large part due to the activities of Kolomoyskyi as Governor of Dnipropetrovsk Oblast, where the 2014 pro-Russian unrest in Ukraine was heavily cracked down upon. Taras Kuzio, Sergei I. Zhuk, and Paul D'Anieri, credit Kolomoyskyi with Dnipropetrovsk Oblast's transformation into a "stronghold of Ukrainian statehood," noting that, "After becoming governor of Dnipropetrovsk region in March 2014, Kolomoyskyy launched an all-out campaign to ensure that separatist sentiment did not spread beyond the Donbas. He personally subsidised the Ukrainian Air Force, offered a $10,000 reward for the capture of a pro-Russian separatist, and backed the creation of the highly effective Dnipro battalions." They have additionally claimed, citing Andriy Portnov, that Euromaidan marked a significant victory for the Dnipropetrovsk Mafia.

During the 2019 Ukrainian presidential election, concerns were expressed by opponents of Volodymyr Zelenskyy that he was controlled by Kolomoyskyi. Zelenskyy's early policy reflected this approach, with officials opposed to Kolomoyskyi's interests being removed. However, after the United States began investigating Kolomoyskyi for financial crimes, Zelenskyy began to change his approach. In 2022, following the Russian invasion of Ukraine, Kolomoyskyi was stripped of his citizenship.

=== Members ===
==== Kuchma/Interpipe faction ====
- Leonid Kuchma
- Victor Pinchuk
- Valeriy Pustovoitenko

==== Lazarenko/Tymoshenko faction ====
- Pavlo Lazarenko
- Yulia Tymoshenko
- Oleksandr Turchynov

==== Kolomoyskyi faction/Privat Group ====
- Ihor Kolomoyskyi
- Borys Filatov
- Gennadiy Bogolyubov

== See also ==
- Kyiv Seven
