= Laborious Ukraine Electoral Bloc =

Ukrainian political bloc

The Laborious Ukraine Electoral Bloc or Labour Ukraine (Ukrainian: Трудова Україна) is a former political alliance in Ukraine that participated in the 1998 Ukrainian parliamentary election.

It consisted of:

- Civil Congress of Ukraine
- Ukrainian Party of Justice

With 4% passing threshold in party voting, it won 3.06% of the popular vote and no seats. The blos also was not successful in a single constituency voting as all of its candidates lost.

Its top five candidates of electoral party list included: Ivan Herasymov (non-partisan), Oleksandr Bazylyuk (Civil Congress of Ukraine), Serhiy Chervonopysky (Ukrainian Party of Justice), Yuriy Andreyev (Ukrainian Party of Justice), Viktor Derzhak (non-partisan).
