= Serhiy Potimkov =

Ukrainian politician (1954–2025)

- Сергі́й Потімко́в'
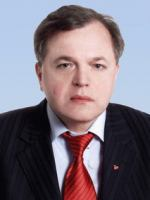
- Potimkov in 2006

People's Deputy of Ukraine
- In office 25 May 2006 – 23 November 2007
- In office 12 May 1998 – 14 May 2002

Personal details
- Born: Serhiy Yuriyovich Potimkov; 11 December 1954; Kharkov, Ukrainian SSR, USSR
- Died: 27 May 2025 (aged 70); Hanover, Lower Saxony, Germany
- Political party: SPU–SelPU (1998–2002); Batkivshchyna (2006–2007)
- Education: Kharkiv State University
- Occupation: Journalist

Serhiy Yuriyovich Potimkov (Ukrainian: Сергі́й Юрі́йович Потімко́в'; 11 December 1954 – 27 May 2025) was a Ukrainian politician. A member of the Socialist Party – Peasant Party and Batkivshchyna, he served in the Verkhovna Rada from 1998 to 2002 and from 2006 to 2007.

Potimkov died in Hanover on 27 May 2025, at the age of 70.
