= State Independence of Ukraine =

Former political party in Ukraine

State Independence of Ukraine Державна самостійність України
- Leader: Roman Koval
- Founder: Zenovii Krasivskyi; Ivan Kandyba
- Founded: April 1990
- Dissolved: 28 May 2003
- Ideology: Ukrainian nationalism

The All-Ukrainian Political Movement "State Independence of Ukraine" (Ukrainian: Всеукраїнське об'єднання «Державна самостійність України», romanized: Vseukrainske obiednannia «Derzhavna samostiinist Ukrainy») was a political party in Ukraine from 1990 until 2003.

== History ==
The party was founded by two former political prisoners and members of the Ukrainian Helsinki Group: Zenovii Krasivskyi (1929–1991) and Ivan Kandyba (1930–2002) in Lviv in April 1990. Only ethnic Ukrainians could join the party, and only Ukrainians were considered an indigenous ethnic group in Ukraine (Ukrainians and Crimean Tatars in the case of Crimea). The party attracted more radical nationalist members than other parties who also urged for Ukrainian independence. (Note: Ukraine as the Ukrainian SSR was part of the Soviet Union since 1920 until 24 August 1991 (Sources: A History of Ukraine: The Land and Its Peoples by Paul Robert Magocsi, University of Toronto Press, 2010, ISBN 1442610212 (page 563/564 & 722/723))) A merge with the more moderate Ukrainian Republican Party was rejected by the party in 1991. The party referred to the Declaration of Independence of Ukraine as 'a useless scrap of paper' as it stated in December 1991 that there was no independent Ukraine; meanwhile it boycotted the Presidential elections of December 1991.

On 23 March 1993 the party received official registration by the Ministry of Justice. Later in 1993 Kandyba left the party to head the Organization of Ukrainian Nationalists and he also tried to dissolve his former party. Early 1994 writer Roman Koval became chairman of the party which under his leadership radicalised.

During the 1994 parliamentary elections the party competed in 11 electoral districts, but none of its candidates made it to the Verkhovna Rada (Ukrainian Parliament).

In the 1998 Ukrainian parliamentary election the party joined a bloc of parties (together with Svoboda) called "Less Words" (Ukrainian: Менше слів), which collected 0.16% of the national vote. From the bloc only Oleh Tyahnybok was voted into Parliament.

From the 1998 parliamentary elections on the party existed only on paper. The party (by chose) did not take part in the 2002 parliamentary elections. On 28 May 2003 the Supreme Court of Ukraine withdrew its registration of the part "as it did not meet Ukrainian legislation. The party tried to legally challenge this decision, but this did not brought any results.

In 2003 the Ministry of Justice of Ukraine annulled registration of the party.

== Stances ==
The party only considered Ukrainians as an indigenous ethnic group of Ukraine (Ukrainians and Crimean Tatars in the case of Crimea). It only accepted ethnic Ukrainians as members. The party openly propagated the idea of establishing a national dictatorship and adhered to the legacy of the Organization of Ukrainian Nationalists’s ideologists Dmytro Dontsov, Mykola Stsiborskyi and Stepan Bandera.
