= Kyiv Seven =

Group of Ukrainian oligarchs during the 1990s and early 2000s

Kyiv clan
- Years active: 1991 - 2004
- Territory: Kyiv
- Ethnicity: Ukrainians
- Activities: state capture, corruption, scamming, white-collar crime
- Rivals: Donetsk Clan, Dnipropetrovsk Mafia

Members of the Kyiv Seven elected to the Verkhovna Rada in the 1998 Ukrainian parliamentary election

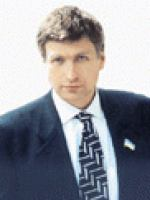
Bohdan Hubskyi (SDPU(o); seat no. 9, party list)

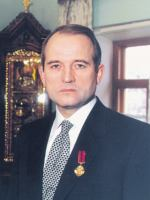
Viktor Medvedchuk (Zakarpattia Oblast, no. 73; SDPU(o))

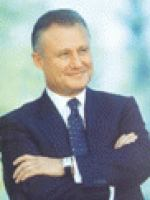
Hryhoriy Surkis (Zakarpattia Oblast, no. 71; SDPU(o))

The Kyiv Seven (Ukrainian: Київська сімка, romanized: Kyyivska simka), also referred to as the Magnificent Seven (Ukrainian: прекрасна сімка, romanized: prekrasna simka), and the Kyiv Clan (Ukrainian: Київський клан, romanized: Kyyivskyi klan) were two interrelated economic and political groups in Ukraine during the 1990s and early 2000s. The term "Kyiv Seven" refers to a group of Ukrainian oligarchs who wielded significant financial and political power in Ukraine during the late 1980s and 1990s. As the name suggests, it comprised seven members: Viktor Medvedchuk, Valentyn Zghursky, Hryhoriy and Ihor Surkis, Bohdan Hubskyi, Yuriy Karpenko, and Yuriy Liakh. The term "Kyiv Clan" more broadly refers to the groups which operated under the Seven's leadership. These groups were one of three large political clans in Ukraine during the presidency of Leonid Kuchma, alongside Kuchma's own Dnipropetrovsk Clan and the Donetsk Clan of Rinat Akhmetov and Viktor Yanukovych, among others.

== Establishment ==
The Kyiv Seven were brought together in 1989 under the leadership of Valentyn Zghursky, at the time head of the Kyiv city executive committee (a position equivalent to the modern-day mayor of Kyiv). The group bonded together over a common interest in association football and support for FC Dynamo Kyiv. Viktor Medvedchuk's link to the group remains unclear, though he has claimed that he met Hryhoriy Surkis while they were both employed by FC Dynamo Kyiv. Zghursky played a pivotal role in Hryhoriy's early business career, and was in turn given a prominent position among the latter's businesses after leaving the mayorship of Kyiv.

== Business activities ==
The business history of the Kyiv Seven began in 1992 with the establishment of offshore financial centres such as Burley and Newport Management. The same year, the Kyiv Seven entered the oil importing business, possibly with either the support of the government of Ukraine or the Ukrainian mafia. With hyperinflation affecting the Ukrainian karbovanets, the Seven imported oil to Ukrainian companies, who in turn provided energy to Ukrainian citizens at a raised price as part of a price fixing agreement.

Logo of FC Dynamo Kyiv, a Kyiv-based football club which played a significant role in the Kyiv Seven's origins and operations

By the end of 1992, the Kyiv Seven had founded the Ometa-21st Century National Investment Fund. Ometa-21st Century was legally founded by the Kyiv Seven-led B.I.M. International Law Firm, in addition to the Ben-Israel and Co. law firm, based in Haifa, Israel. Ometa-21st Century was made up of the subdivisions of Ometa-Trust, Ometa-Invest, Ometa-Inster, and Ometa-Private. Hryhoriy Surkis headed the Ometa-Inster board of directors, while Bohdan Hubskyi served as deputy head. Beginning in 1993, Ometa-21st Century began selling shares valued at 1,000 karbovantsiv, with advertised dividends as high as 1,000%. Share prices steadily rose, and by mid-1993, over 12,000 people had purchased 440 million karbovantsiv in shares. In March 1994, the company's shareholders were paid dividends, but it was announced in early 1995 that the remaining shares could not be paid back, in a Ponzi scheme compared by Ukrainska Pravda to the MMM scheme in neighbouring Russia.

Also in 1993, the Kyiv Seven took over FC Dynamo Kyiv in what was termed as the "Dynamo Revolution", firing president Viktor Bezverkhyi and installing Hryhoriy Surkis in his place. Leonid Kravchuk, then president of Ukraine, refused to get involved in the matter despite protests, and the matter was prevented from reaching courts by Medvedchuk's connections to the legal system. This event brought Surkis and Medvedchuk to the leadership of the Kyiv Seven.

In the aftermath of the "Dynamo Revolution" and the Ometa-21st Century scheme, the Seven returned to the energy sector, founding Slavutych Industrial-Financial Concern in early 1994. Hryhoriy Surkis served as president of the concern, while Hubskyi was head of the board of directors. Slavutych was primarily concerned with the energy import sector, as well as selling products created by others. According to Medvedchuk, Slavutych had taken over 10-12% of the petroleum processing industry in Ukraine by 1995–1996. According to Yuriy Buzduhan, leader of the Social Democratic Party of Ukraine (unrelated to SDPU(o)), asserted in 1998 that Slavutych was purchasing petroleum at ₴0.30–0.40 and selling it to collective farms at a rate of ₴1.20, or as high as ₴2.40 during harvests. With many farmers unable to pay the full price, they instead paid in sugar and other products, which was exported to Russia in return for oil, then refined and sent to Ukraine for sale. Slavutych made profits of up to 800% as a result of this barter cycle.

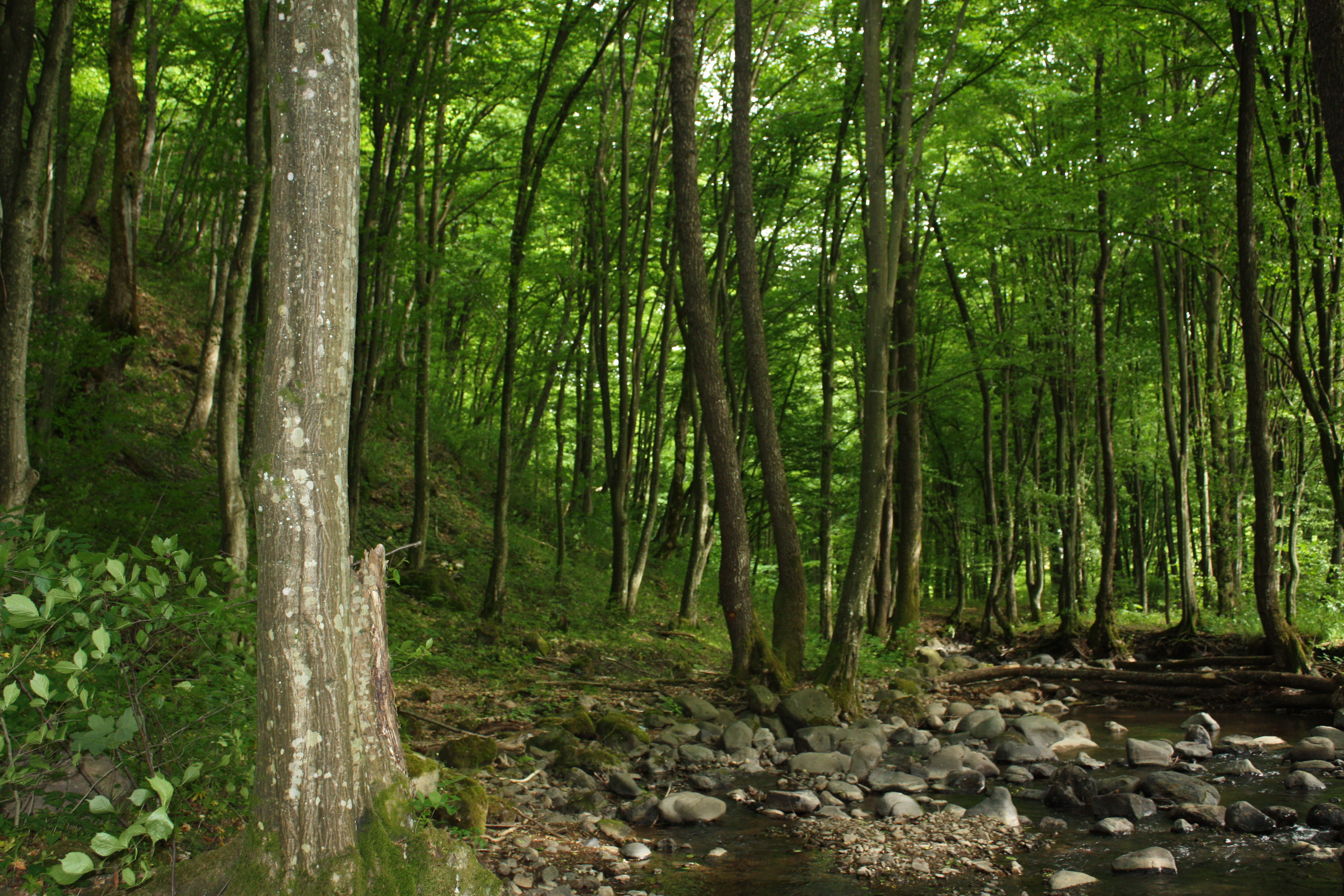
A forest in Zakarpattia Oblast. The Kyiv Seven were involved in forestry in Zakarpattia, allegedly threatening tree species in the region

By the late 1990s, the Seven had shifted its focuses to achieving total monopolisation of the Ukrainian energy industry, an endeavour supported by Prime Minister Valeriy Pustovoitenko (deputy owner of FC Dynamo Kyiv under Surkis). In 1998, Pustovoitenko signed an act transferring 25% of government shares in energy companies in the Kirovohrad, Ternopil, and Kherson Oblasts to Ukrainian Credit Bank, owned by Surkis. By 1999, the Seven effectively controlled the energy sector of western Ukraine, as well as Sumy and Chernihiv Oblasts. They additionally held substantial shares in the energy companies of Kirovohrad, Kherson, and Poltava Oblasts. Oblast power companies were privatised at minimal prices, and involved in the Seven's barter process. The privatisation of these companies and their purchase by associates of FC Dynamo Kyiv drew the attention of the Security Service of Ukraine and the Prosecutor General, with the latter ordering the privatisations cancelled. In spite of this, however, the Seven set their sights on power companies in Dnipropetrovsk, Kyiv, and Zaporizhzhia Oblasts, particularly the Zaporizhzhia Nuclear Power Plant, responsible for producing one-fifth of Ukrainian energy production and 47% of Ukrainian nuclear power.

At this time, the Seven also began to branch out into various other ventures. The Black Sea ports of Mykolaiv, Odesa, and Kherson were monopolised by the group, which lobbied for the establishment of free economic zones throughout southern Ukraine. In Zakarpattia Oblast, Slavutych engaged in forestry, leading to protests from local environmental activists who accused the concern of driving local tree species to the brink of extinction through mass felling. By this time, the Kyiv Seven also effectively controlled the cardboard and metal industries, and held sway over the food and alcohol industries of the country. According to members of the Kyiv City Council, Surkis even expressed a desire to sell the Saint Sophia Cathedral in Kyiv.

== Political activities ==
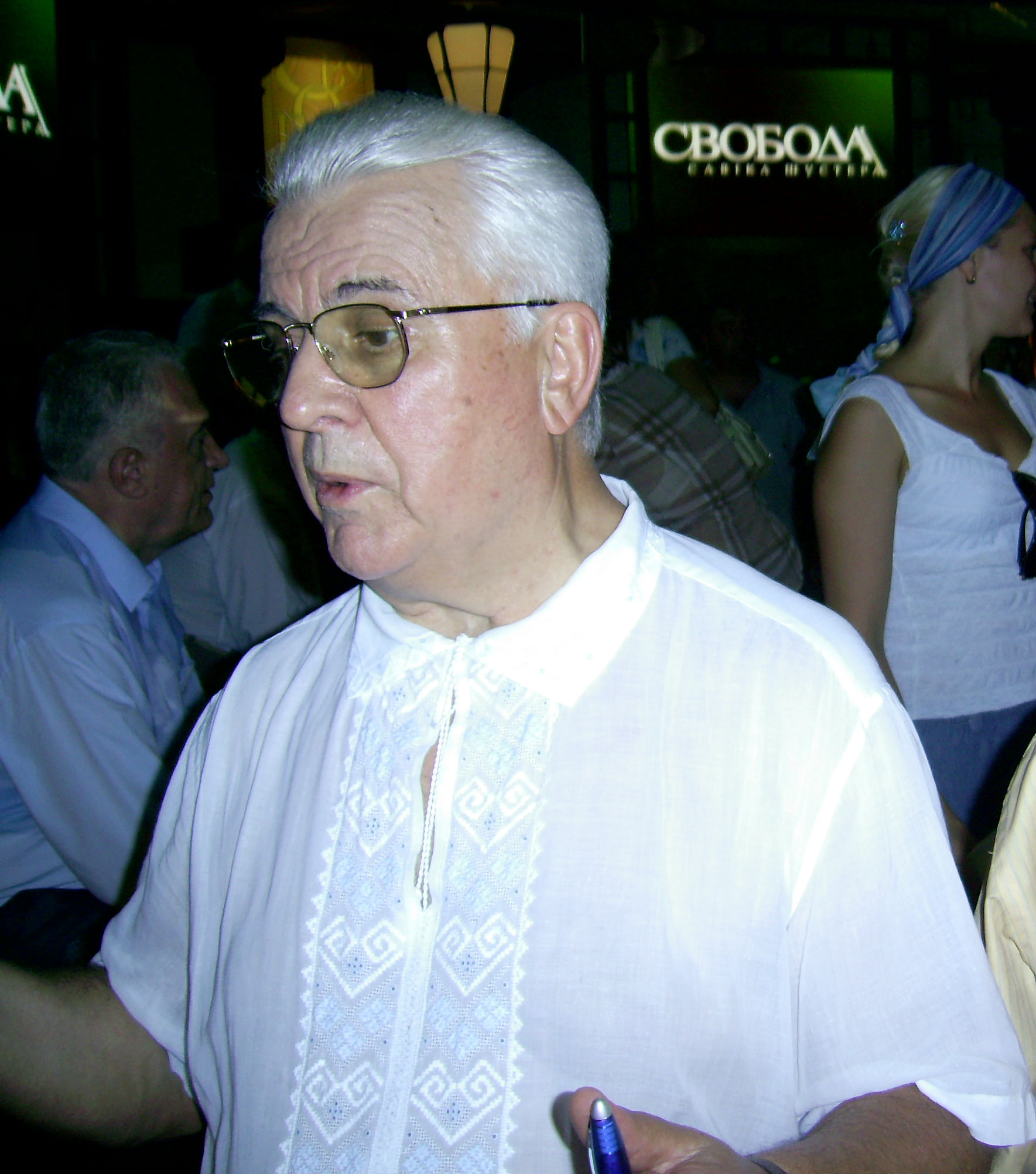
Former President Leonid Kravchuk (pictured here in 2006) and his SDPU(o) were backed by the Kyiv Seven

Politically, the Kyiv Seven were aligned with Russophile groups in Ukrainian politics, primarily President Leonid Kravchuk and later the Social Democratic Party of Ukraine (united), or SDPU(o). During the 1994 Ukrainian presidential election, both Medvedchuk and Surkis attempted to become members of Kravchuk's electoral staff, though he refused the offer due to the fact that there were no suitable roles to be filled. Following the victory of Leonid Kuchma, the government position on the Seven initially changed from one of friendliness to one of hostility. In November 1994, Kuchma referred to the group as "a monopoly, which, from a meagre start, managed to operate with billions of dollars." An investigation was also launched into allegations of Slavutych illegally being funded by the government, and attempts were made by Kuchma's staff to intimidate Surkis into leaving the country.

However, this divide soon mended, possibly with the mediation of Dmytro Tabachnyk, and both Surkis and Medvedchuk were awarded the Order of Merit in 1996. Following their spat with Kuchma, the Seven sought new political coverage, with their position appearing untenable. Surkis joined the SDPU(o) in 1996, and provided ample funding to the party, working to transform it into a political organ of the Seven. Surkis brought in allies Oleksandr Zinchenko and Ihor Pluzhnikov, who, while unaffiliated with the Kyiv Seven, became a vital part of the SDPU(o)'s organs. In a 1997 by-election, Medvedchuk was elected to the Verkhovna Rada (Ukrainian parliament) from Ukraine's 73rd electoral district by a margin of 94.16%, a record number of votes cast for a single candidate. In the 1998 Ukrainian parliamentary election less than a year later, three members of the Kyiv Seven were elected to the Verkhovna Rada: Medvedchuk, Surkis from Ukraine's 71st electoral district, and Hubskyi as 9th on the party list of SDPU(o). The other results were less fortunate: only 14 of the 178 party-list candidates were elected, as SDPU(o) won only 4.01% of the vote, and only four of the 128 single-mandate district candidates won election. After the election, however, another 25 deputies expressed a desire to join the SDPU(o) faction, and the party received recognition as a significant political force.

After the election, an effort was made to remove those unaffiliated with the Kyiv Seven from the party. Vasyl Onopenko, leader of the party, was removed after saying that the party's leaning on the FC Dynamo Kyiv brand and party list candidates were mistakes. Next was Yevhen Marchuk, former Prime Minister of Ukraine, who sought to become President of Ukraine. Medvedchuk, meanwhile, rose through the ranks of the party and the Verkhovna Rada, being elected as president of SDPU(o) in October 1998 and later as deputy Chairman of the Verkhovna Rada in February 2000.

Following the 1999 Ukrainian presidential election, the Seven came into conflict with Kuchma once again, with Medvedchuk making preparations to succeed him as President of Ukraine. These conflicts would eventually lead to the group's downfall.

== Downfall ==
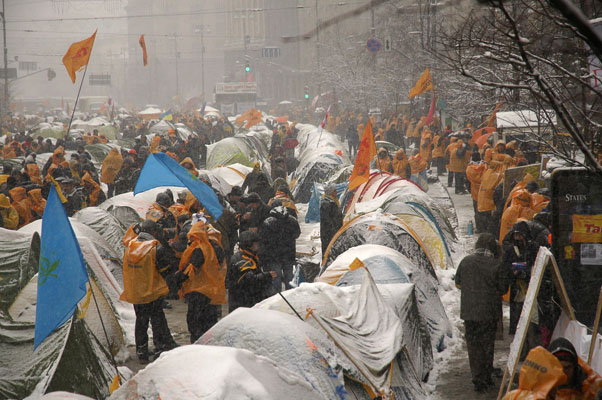
The 2004–2005 Orange Revolution resulted in the decline of the Kyiv Clan before the clan system totally collapsed following the 2014 Revolution of Dignity

By 2001, the Kyiv Clan, in spite of a bitter effort with Kuchma's Dnipropetrovsk Clan to take control of the country, lost out to the Donetsk Clan, a group led by Mykola Azarov, Viktor Yanukovych, and Rinat Akhmetov which had previously held the premiership under Yukhym Zvyahilsky, who served briefly in an acting tenure from 1993 to 1994. Also bringing the Donetsk Clan into conflict with the Seven was the increasing recognition of FC Shakhtar Donetsk, a Donetsk-based football club, and the increasingly antagonistic relationship between fans of Shakhtar Donetsk and Dynamo Kyiv. Ravil Safiullin's appointment as president of the Professional Football League of Ukraine in 2000 was viewed as a slight against Surkis, who had previously held the post. The creation of the Party of Regions in 2001 was a further step by the Donetsk Clan against the Kyiv Seven in attempting to assert control over the country. In the 2004 Ukrainian presidential election, Medvedchuk ultimately did not run, instead lending his support to Yanukovych as one of his primary backers.

The ultimate death knell for the Kyiv Clan was the success of the 2004–2005 Orange Revolution. Following the Orange Revolution, Yuriy Liakh, a member of the Seven, was found dead with a suicide note, having apparently slashed his throat with a letter opener. Medvedchuk later fled the country, anticipating criminal charges, and eventually declared his retirement from politics in 2006. Hubskyi joined the Yulia Tymoshenko Bloc. In the revolution's aftermath, the clans began to lose their strength, and the Kyiv Clan declined in power. This decline was further hastened by the 2014 Revolution of Dignity, which led to the total end of the clans and the establishment of the government of Ukraine as a force replacing the clans.

== Notable members ==
=== The Seven ===
1. Valentyn Zghursky
2. Viktor Medvedchuk
3. Hryhoriy Surkis
4. Ihor Surkis
5. Bohdan Hubskyi
6. Yuriy Karpenko
7. Yuriy Liakh

=== Others ===
- Petro Poroshenko
