= Socialist Party – Peasant Party =

For the Truth, For the People, For Ukraine! Виборчий блок Соціалістичної партії України та Селянської партії України "За правду, за народ, за Україну!"
- Abbreviation: SPU–SelPU
- Leaders: Oleksandr Moroz; Serhii Dovhan
- Founded: 14 June 1997
- Registered: 1 November 1997
- Dissolved: 14 May 2002
- Ideology: Democratic socialism Factions: Social democracy Agrarian socialism
- Political position: Centre-left to left-wing
- Colours: Blue; Yellow; Red (customary)

Socialist Party – Peasant Party (Ukrainian: Соціалістична партія – Селянська партія, romanized: Sotsialistychna partiia – Selianska partiia; SPU–SelPU), officially known as the Electoral Bloc of the Socialist Party of Ukraine and the Peasant Party of Ukraine "For the Truth, For the People, For Ukraine!" (Ukrainian: Виборчий блок Соціалістичної партії України та Селянської партії України "За правду, за народ, за Україну!", romanized: Vyborchyi blok Sotsialistychnoi partii Ukrainy ta Selianskoi partii Ukrainy "Za pravdu, za narod, za Ukrainu!") was the political alliance and an electoral bloc in Ukraine that managed to win parliamentary seats on party list. The alliance was founded in November 1997 to participate in the 1998 parliamentary election and consisted of the Socialist Party of Ukraine and the Peasant Party of Ukraine.

== Election results ==
Top-10 on the party list: Oleksandr Moroz (SPU), Serhiy Dovhan (SelPU), Viktor Suslov (independent), Ivan Chyzh (SPU), Ivan Bokyi (independent), Stanislav Nikolaenko (SPU), Oleksandr Tkachenko (SelPU), Kostiantyn Dovhan (SelPU), Yosyp Vinskyi (SPU), Nina Markovska (SPU).

Party	PR			Constituency			Total seats	+/–
Party	Votes	%	Seats	Votes	%	Seats	Total seats	+/–
Socialist Party – Peasant Party	2,273,788	8.8	29	1,067,267	4.2	6	35	New
Socialist Party of Ukraine			14			3	17	+3
Peasant Party of Ukraine			10			2	12	-7
Independents			5			1	6	-

== Parliamentary faction ==
Following the election, the bloc has created a faction "Left Center" in the Verkhovna Rada.

On 17 October 2000 on proposition of the Left Center deputy, several members of Verkhovna Rada left in protest against the closing of publishing of "Peasant Herald". On 3 July 2001, the faction requested on urgent creation of provisional parliamentary commission in investigation of board governors of the Agrarian Bank "Ukraine" that led to bankruptcy of that bank.
