= Kievskiye Vedomosti =

Newspaper in Kyiv (1992–2010)

The Kievskiye Vedomosti (Russian: Киевские ведомости) was a local daily Russian-language newspaper, based in Kyiv. It was published between 1992 and 2010 in a tabloid format. Its chief editor, Viktor Chayka, had been affiliated with the Narodnyy Rukh Ukrainy party, but was expelled after the Kievskiye Vedomosti took an independent line, and criticised selected Rukh members. In the late 1990s, two of the correspondents for Kievskiye Vedomosti were killed in connection with a government investigation into journalism . Kievskiye Vedomosti is a member of UAPP.
