= Zenovii Krasivskyi =

Ukrainian poet, Soviet dissident, and human rights activist (1929–1991)

- Зеновій Красівський
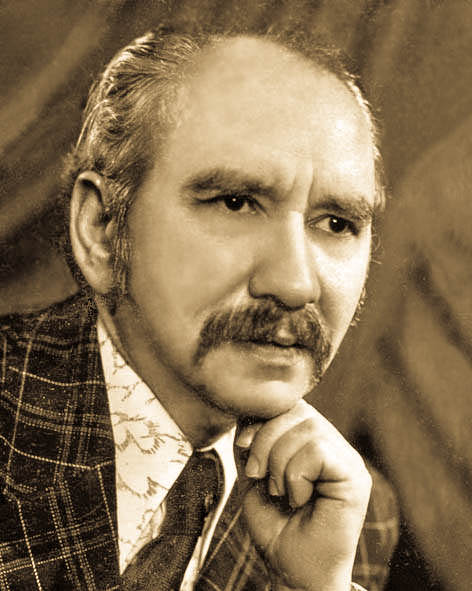

Leader of the Organisation of Ukrainian Nationalists (Banderite) within Ukraine
- In office 1990 – 20 September 1991
- Preceded by: Vasyl Kuk (1954)
- Succeeded by: Slava Stetsko

Personal details
- Born: 12 November 1929 Witwica, Poland (now Vytvytsia, Ukraine)
- Died: 20 September 1991 (aged 61) Morshyn, Ukraine
- Party: Organisation of Ukrainian Nationalists
- Other political affiliations: Ukrainian National Front; All-Ukrainian Political Movement "State Independence of Ukraine"
- Spouses: Stefania Yurovych (m. 1960, divorced) Olena Antoniv (m. 1978; died 1986)
- Children: 2 (Yaroslav, Myroslav)

Zenovii (Note: Sometimes also written Zynovii (Зиновій) or Zinovii (Зіновій).) Mykhailovych Krasivskyi (Ukrainian: Зеновій Михайлович Красівський; 12 November 1929 – 20 September 1991), also spelled Zenovij Krasivskyj, was a Ukrainian poet, Soviet dissident, and human rights activist. He was a member of the Ukrainian Helsinki Group, and in the last year of his life the leader of the Banderite wing of the Organisation of Ukrainian Nationalists within Ukraine.

== Early life and first arrest ==
Krasivskyi was born on 12 November 1929, in the village of Witwica, in the Stanisławów Voivodeship of the Second Polish Republic (now Vytvytsia in Ukraine's Ivano-Frankivsk Oblast). His family supported the Organisation of Ukrainian Nationalists, and his older brothers were members of the Ukrainian Insurgent Army. This influenced his worldview and attitudes towards Ukrainian nationalism.

Krasivskyi's family was deported to the Kazakh Soviet Socialist Republic by the Soviet government in 1947 or 1948. Rather than following them, Zenovii fled to the Carpathian Mountains, where he lived illegally until he was badly injured, upon which he moved to Lviv. In 1949 he was arrested, and tried by the NKVD. He was sentenced to five years imprisonment in Arkhangelsk Oblast and forbidden from ever returning to Ukraine.

== Amnesty ==
Krasivskyi was released as part of the amnesty of 1953, and allowed to visit his family in Karaganda. There, he worked as a miner, and partook in the opening of Ukrainian-language schools and book stores in the city. During his time as a miner, he sustained several injuries, including being buried under rubble and injured in an explosion, and as a result suffered damage to his spine and paralysis in his legs. He was formally recognised as an invalid and given a pension. He began studying journalism at the University of Lviv in 1956, but was arrested in 1959 and accused of having pursued nationalist activities while in Karaganda. In particular, he was accused of having organised Greek Catholic religious ceremonies in prison camps, having organised Ukrainian-language classes, smuggling books from Ukraine, and organising dance halls. According to a letter he wrote upon his entry to the Ukrainian Helsinki Group, he managed to avoid a trial and was allowed to return to Ukraine, as his invalid status meant he was no longer required to be a special settler.

Krasivskyi first married music teacher Stefania Yurovych in 1960 and had his first son, Yaroslav, the same year. During this time, he may have met and interacted with Viacheslav Chornovil, who was then an employee at Lviv Television (now Suspilne Lviv), as part of his studies. Chornovil would go on to emerge as the leader of Ukraine's dissidents. Krasivskyi moved to Morshyn in 1963. He had a second son, Myroslav, the next year, and later divorced Yurovych.

In 1964, amidst the Khrushchev Thaw, Krasivskyi established the Ukrainian National Front, an underground Ukrainian nationalist organisation. He wrote for the UNF's journal, Freedom and Fatherland (Ukrainian: Воля і батківщина, romanized: Volia i batkivshchyna), and took up samvydav writing, creating the novel Baida and three poem collections between 1965 and 1966. In the latter year, he also wrote "The Memorandum of the UNF to the 23rd Congress of the Communist Party of the Soviet Union", an open letter which condemned the 1965–1966 Ukrainian purge and the Russification of Ukraine, and called for the release of special settlers. This brought the group under the surveillance of the KGB. Other open letters were written to various government organs, including one to high-ranking leaders of the Ukrainian Soviet Socialist Republic (First Secretary Petro Shelest, Chairman of the Council of Ministers Volodymyr Shcherbytsky, and Chairman of the Supreme Soviet Demyan Korotchenko) urging them to declare Ukraine as a sovereign entity.

== Second arrest and psychiatric hospital stay ==
Krasivskyi was re-arrested in March 1967 alongside fellow UNF leaders Dmytro Kvetsko, Mykhailo Diak, Yaroslav Lesiv, and Vasyl Kulynyn. They were charged with treason and involvement in a conspiratorial group and tried under the Supreme Court of the Ukrainian SSR. Krasivskyi was sentenced to 12 years imprisonment (of which seven were to be spent in corrective labour colonies) and five years of internal exile.

Krasivskyi initially spent his sentence at Vladimir Central Prison, and continued to write poems in this time period. In 1972, he was released and placed in a psychiatric hospital in the city of Smolensk. He was moved to a Lviv psychiatric hospital in 1976. The same year, he was declared a prisoner of conscience by international human rights non-governmental organisation Amnesty International. Iris Akahoshi, an American member of Amnesty International, took particular interest in Krasivskyi's case, and began exchanging letters with him. Over the course of the next nine years, the two exchanged hundreds of letters. Following his 1978 release Krasivskyi credited Akahoshi's letters with helping him to stay alive.

== Release, third arrest, and later career ==
After being released Krasivskyi married fellow dissident Olena Antoniv, whom he had met in 1974 during his time in Smolensk. Taras Chornovil, Antoniv's son from her first marriage with Viacheslav Chornovil, supported the marriage, and it was permitted by the KGB despite laws barring individuals diagnosed as mentally ill from being married. He joined the Ukrainian Helsinki Group in 1979, and devoted himself to the revival of the Ukrainian Greek Catholic Church.

On 12 March 1980, Krasivskyi was arrested yet again. He was interned at Perm-36 for eight months, and served the sentenced five years of exile in Tyumen Oblast. He was released in 1985 and returned to Lviv. The next year, tragedy struck Krasivskyi after Antoniv was killed in a car crash. Antoniv's death pushed Krasivskyi to further devote himself to public activities, and he took an active part in the development of the Ukrainian Greek Catholic Church, backing the construction of a women's monastery in the village of Hoshiv.

Krasivskyi was politically active during the 1989–1991 Ukrainian revolution, serving as secretary of the Ukrainian Helsinki Union, founding the State Independence of Ukraine party, and participating in the People's Movement of Ukraine, the Memorial society, and the revived Prosvita. Krasivskyi also became leader of the Organisation of Ukrainian Nationalists in 1990, although this fact was not revealed until after his death.

He died in Morshyn on 20 September 1991 after suffering a stroke. Ukraine declared independence less than a month prior to his death.
