= Iris Akahoshi =

American human rights activist (1929-1987)

- Born: March 14, 1929; Czechoslovakia
- Died: July 24, 1987 (aged 58)
- Occupation: Human rights activist

Iris Akahoshi (March 14, 1929 – July 24, 1987) was an American human rights activist who became known for her persistent support of a jailed Ukrainian political prisoner.

== Biography ==
Akahoshi was born in Czechoslovakia to German parents. Her family moved to the United States when she was a young child and she grew up in Hollywood, California. An engineer by training, she soon moved on to other interests. As she once wrote, "I simply cannot commit myself to one thing for any great length of time, and consequently I can never really become an expert at anything, though I came close to it in the engineering field. (I remained in it for seven years and was considered one of the better persons in my trade.)"

=== Correspondent ===
In 1976, through her involvement with Amnesty International's Group 11 based in New York City, Akahoshi began writing letters of support to the oppressed Ukrainian political prisoner Zenovii Krasivskyi (1929-1991, sometimes spelled Zenovij Krasivskyj), a "Ukrainian poet, human rights activist, and defender of Ukraine's right to independence." She had no knowledge of Slavic languages. (Persistent letter writing to jailed dissidents has been a successful strategy long favored by the human rights organization Amnesty International.)

In 1976, Akahoshi wrote the first of many letters to Krasivskyi when he was forcibly detained in a psychiatric hospital (Serbsky Institute, a "notorious Soviet psychiatric prison for dissidents"), but she did not receive a reply to any of them until he had received the 31st, after he had been temporarily freed and was able to answer. When his reply in Ukrainian was finally received, it said, "Dear Iris: In front of me are thirty one of your letters. This is my reply to the first one. The responses to the rest will follow...."

During the following years of persecution, he was taken to labor camps and then into Siberian exile. Despite his imprisonments, the "poignant correspondence" between the two continued and they became close friends, even though they were never able to meet and spoke over the telephone only once. (The letters were translated by fellow AI Group 11 member Anna Procyk.)

Their correspondence reveals Akahoshi's deep spirituality and overarching love of nature as well as Krasivskyi's poetry and musings. Together, the writings been called "one of the most touching human documents of the cruel age." Their letters would outlive both; ultimately the collection was published in book form by Amnesty International.

According to Krasivskyi, in a letter to her widower,

"Iris has come to me at a moment when I was at the lowest point of my existence--when it appeared that there were no windows or doors of escape from my condition….I had no doubt that she was sent to me by Providence as a ray of hope, as a bar of salvation for a drowning man….I resurrected and Iris became for me a bright star that did not cease to glow for many years to come. I have not known anyone who would embody so fully the best humanistic ideals as did Iris. Time may bring about change, but the idea of hope, the consciousness of something permanent and firm would never leave you because of Iris. She was like the light within you. Blessed be her name."

The relationship was not one-sided as attested by Akahoshi's friends. After she died, her friends wrote to Krasivskyi, saying,

"his correspondence 'opened a new world for her. This is probably was one of the most important aspects of her life for the last 10 years.'"

=== Legacy ===
- In 2013, many years of correspondence was translated and edited by Anna Procyk and published by Smoloskyp Publishers. Both Akahoshi and Krasivskyi are credited as co-authors of the book. A review of the book by Alexander Motyl in The Ukrainian Weekly, May 18, 2014 says, "Readers of this moving and informative volume will have the privilege of sharing in the lives of an American activist and a Ukrainian dissident, both of whom wanted to live their lives ethically and make a difference – and succeeded on both counts."
- An image of Akahoshi appears in the play UBN of the Lviv Ukrainian Academic Theater named after M. Zankovetska (2000, directed by G. Telnyuk).

== External sources ==
- Anna Procyk, editor and translator,"Two Worlds, One Idea: Ten Years of Correspondence between Amnesty International Group 11 and a Ukrainian Political Prisoner, Zinovii Krasivskyj". New York and Kyiv: Smoloskyp, 2013; ISBN 978-966-1676-54-0
- Correspondence of Ukrainian political prisoner Zinoviy Krasivsky with Amnesty International member Iris Akagoshi, museum.khpg.org. Accessed June 14, 2024.
- De Boer, S. P.; Driessen, Evert J.; Verhaar, Hendrik L. (1982-05-26). Biographical Dictionary of Dissidents in the Soviet Union: 1956-1975. BRILL. ISBN 978-90-247-2538-0.
- International biographical dictionary of dissidents of Central and Eastern Europe and the former USSR. Vol. 1. Ukraine. Part 1. - Kharkiv: Kharkiv Human Rights Group; Human Rights, 2006, pg. 27 (in Ukrainian)
- Amnesty International (Group 11, NYC website)
- Reference to Iris Akahoshi, khpg.org. Accessed June 14, 2024.
