= Donetsk Clan =

Ukrainian oligarch and organised crime group

- Донецький клан
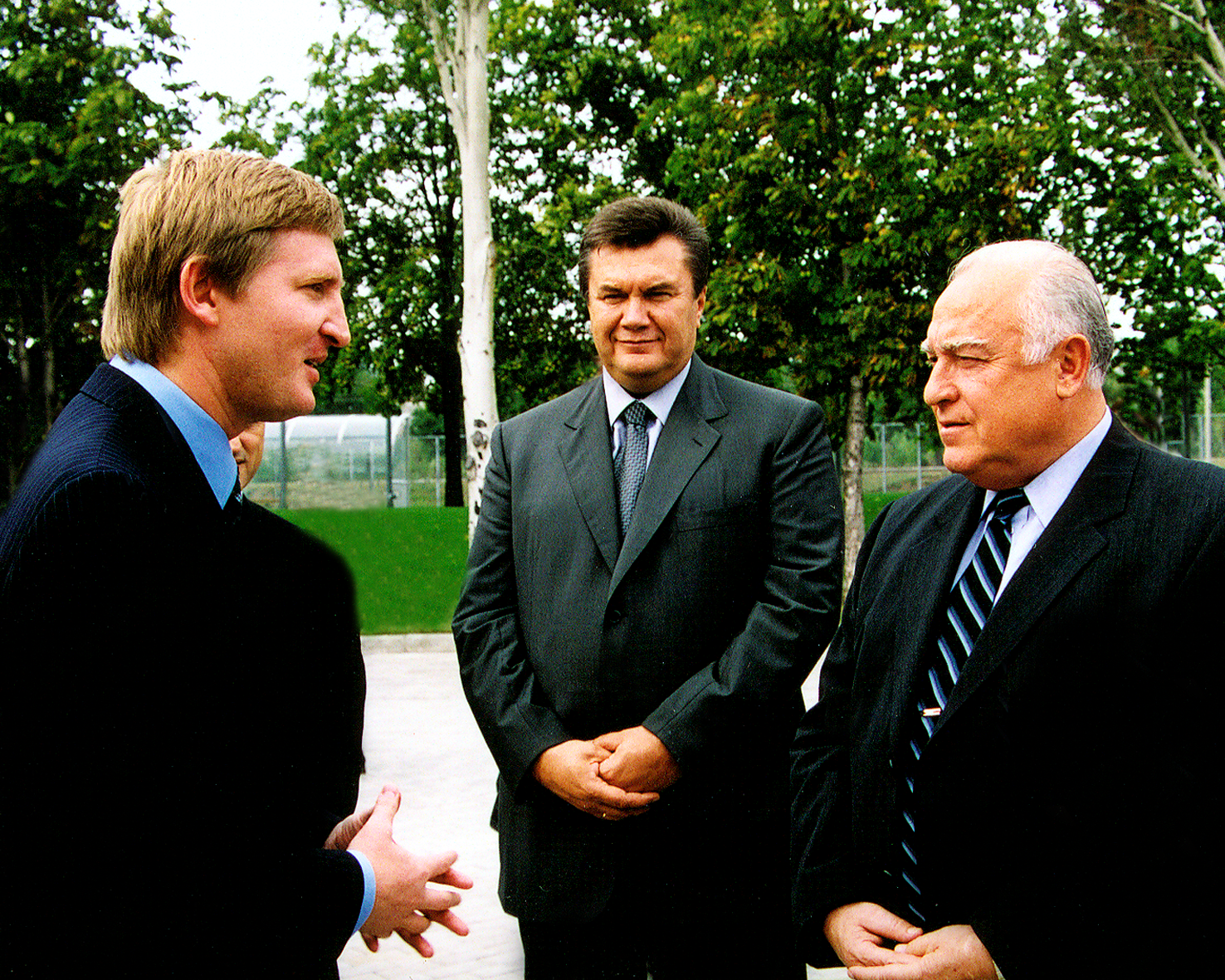
- Donetsk clan leaders Rinat Akhmetov and Viktor Yanukovych (left and centre, respectively) with Russian Prime Minister Viktor Chernomyrdin
- Founding location: Donetsk, Ukraine
- Years active: 1991–2014 (23 years)
- Territory: Donbas, Ukraine
- Ethnicity: Volga Tatars, Ukrainians, Russians
- Leaders: Akhat Bragin (1991–1994), Rinat Akhmetov, Dmytro Firtash, Viktor Yanukovych
- Activities: Corruption, drug trafficking, gambling, human trafficking, profiteering, prostitution, state capture
- Allies: Solntsevskaya Bratva
- Rivals: Kyiv Seven, Dnipropetrovsk Mafia
- Notable members: Mykola Azarov, Borys Kolesnikov, Oleksandr Yefremov

The Donetsk Clan (Ukrainian: Донецький клан, romanized: Donetskyi klan; Russian: Донецкий клан, romanized: Donetsky klan), also called the Donetsk mafia, the Donetsk Family, or simply "The Family", was a group of Ukrainian oligarchs and members of the Ukrainian mafia active between the late Soviet period and the 2014 Revolution of Dignity, when the clan collapsed. Emerging from the nomenklatura of Ukraine's eastern Donbas region, the Donetsk Clan formed one of the three main groupings of oligarchs during the presidency of Leonid Kuchma, alongside Viktor Medvedchuk's Kyiv Seven and Kuchma's own Dnipropetrovsk Mafia. In Kuchma's second term, the clan outplayed the other two groups, leading to the political rise of Viktor Yanukovych. Following Yanukovych's fall from power, the Donetsk Clan dissolved, though its members remained prominent in Ukraine.

== Background ==
Following World War II, the Donbas region, and in particular the city of Donetsk, faced wide-reaching urbanisation and immigration from throughout the Soviet Union. From 1945 to 1955, roughly 3.5 million people settled in Donetsk to work in the city's coal mines and factories. Further increasing the city's population was the Gulag camps located nearby, and these individuals entered organised crime after the completion of their prison sentences. Sergey Pryjmachuk, Sloviansk chief of police from 1994 to 1998, said in 2006, "Criminals took advantage of the fact that recently released prisoners were not in a hurry to leave the Donetsk region as long as people had money. Thus, illegal night clubs and casinos were created, while that was prohibited in the rest of the USSR. Those casinos and night clubs belonged to criminal gangs that cultivated their own territory."

With the large population of prisoners, Soviet prison culture was exported to the Donbas. By the time of Perestroika, this had grown to a general distrust of the law and the cultural dominance of criminal groups in the Donbas. Combined with a lack of established laws and taxes on businesses, along with a general economic slump, and the closure of unprofitable mines by the Ukrainian government, a "Ukrainian rust belt" came into being in the Donbas, and crime rose sharply.

== History ==
The Donetsk Clan formed shortly following the Declaration of Independence of Ukraine, as members of the former nomenklatura united with newly wealthy businessmen and members of the Ukrainian mafia in an effort to secure their own control over the Donbas region. In its early years, the Donetsk Clan was dominated by violent competition; the clan's leader, Akhat Bragin, was killed in a 1995 bombing at Shakhtar Stadium, and various other members either were killed off by other criminal groups or left to the Ukrainian capital of Kyiv after taking political office.

Following Bragin's death, fellow Donetsk businessman Rinat Akhmetov took over his businesses and further expanded on them. He joined forces with Viktor Yanukovych, Governor of Donetsk Oblast and himself a former violent criminal who was willing to forge an alliance with Akhmetov's FC Shakhtar Donetsk. Between 1994 and 2004, the Donetsk Clan consumed its opponents, assuming economic control over the Donbas. However, the clan was also focused on politics, and mobilised local residents against the Communist Party of Ukraine beginning in the late 1990s. Using government resources controlled as a result of state capture, the clan organised the Party of Regions as an alternative to the Communist Party, resulting in the party entering the Ukrainian government in 2002. The clan also expanded eastwards into Luhansk, effectively taking over the city's underworld after the murder of Luhansk mobster Valerii Dobroslavskyi in 1997.

In 2002, Yanukovych was appointed as Prime Minister of Ukraine by President Leonid Kuchma. The move was widely seen as a victory for Akhmetov, and in Yanukovych's campaign in the 2004 presidential election, Akhmetov lent his support. However, after Yanukovych turned to Russian president Vladimir Putin and electoral fraud in an effort to defeat opposition candidate Viktor Yushchenko, the Orange Revolution successfully contested the election's legitimacy, and helped ensure Yushchenko's election. After Yushchenko took office, he began targeting the Donetsk Clan. Akhmetov in particular was a victim of anti-oligarch measures, and he fled to Monaco to avoid prosecution for illegally obtaining his assets. He would later return to campaign on Yanukovych's behalf.

=== Yanukovych presidency and aftermath ===
After Yanukovych was successfully elected as president in the 2010 Ukrainian presidential election, he began placing members of the Donetsk Clan in high-ranking positions. Serhiy Arbuzov, Oleksandr Klymenko, and Vitaliy Zakharchenko, all members of the Donetsk Clan, were appointed to offices within the government, and Mykola Azarov, a member of the clan, was appointed as Prime Minister. Yanukovych's son, Oleksandr, also became a millionaire under his father's rule.

The corruption of the Donetsk clan was a prime target of the 2013–2014 Euromaidan protests, and the clan's other two leaders, Firtash and Akhmetov, ultimately played a pivotal role in ousting Yanukovych from office. Following the Revolution of Dignity, the clan entered into an agreement with pro-Russian gas executives, forming the Opposition Bloc. However, the clan's political influence was severely weakened after the city of Donetsk was captured by the separatist Donetsk People's Republic during the War in Donbas, and the clan, along with the Kyiv Seven, proved unable to survive.

== See also ==
- System Capital Management
- Industrial Union of Donbas
- Yuriy Ivanyushchenko
