= Party of Veterans of Afghanistan =

Party of Veterans of Afghanistan Партія ветеранів Афганістану
- Founder: Serhiy Chervonopysky
- Founded: February 9, 1993; 33 years ago
- Headquarters: Kyiv
- Ideology: Veterans' rights
- Political position: Big tent
- Verkhovna Rada: 0 / 450
- Regions: 6 / 43,122

Website
- www.upva.org.ua (archived)

Party of Veterans of Afghanistan (Ukrainian: Партія ветеранів Афганістану) is a political party of Ukraine. It was created by the Ukrainian society of veterans of Afghanistan initially as the Ukrainian Party of Justice (UPS).

The party was registered on February 9, 1993.

In 1998 it was part of political alliance (bloc) Laborious Ukraine Electoral Bloc.

In 2001 the Ukrainian Party of Justice was renamed into Ukrainian Party of Justice – Union of veterans, handicapped, Chornobyl [victims], and [veterans of Soviet war in] Afghanistan (UPS — SVIChA).

In 2002 it joined a political alliance Unity.

In 2005 supposedly the party merged into the Socialist Party of Ukraine.

In 2020 the Ministry of Justice of Ukraine filed a lawsuit to annul the registration of the party among 48 other "zombie parties" who did not participate in the elections for 10 years.

== See also ==
- Party of Veterans of the Afghan War Kyrgz Afghan War Veteran's party
