= Mykola Lavrukhin =

Politician

An image of his signature, taken on 1987

Mykola Vasylovych Lavrukhin (25 January 1925, Mityakinska village, Tarasovsky district, Rostov region, RSFSR, USSR—18 September 1994, Kyiv, Ukraine) was a Ukrainian Soviet statesman, chairman of the executive committee of the Kyiv City Council of People's Deputies in 1990, honored builder of the Ukrainian SSR, and laureate of the prize of the Council of Ministers of the USSR. Deputy of the Verkhovna Rada of the Ukrainian SSR of the 10th and 11th convocations.

== Biography ==
He was born into a peasant family. He started his career in 1943 as a track repair worker on the Donetsk Railway. In 1947, he graduated from the Voroshilovograd Technical School of Railway Transport, after which he worked in the Voroshilovograd construction and assembly department of the "Pivdenavtoprombud" trust as a foreman, head of department, and chief engineer.

In 1954, he graduated from higher engineering courses at the Kyiv Engineering and Construction Institute, then studied at a graduate school.

Member of the CPSU since 1955.

In 1957–1961, he worked as a senior engineer of the Ministry of Construction of the Ukrainian SSR and chief specialist of the State Building of the Ukrainian SSR. In 1961–1963, he worked as a chief engineer and then as a manager of the "Buddetal" trust of the Holovkyivmskbudu.

In 1963–1970, he was the head of the construction and urban management departments of the Kyiv Regional Committee of the Communist Party of Ukraine.

From 1970 he worked as the first deputy chairman of the executive committee of the Kyiv City Council of Workers' Deputies (from 1978, of the Kyiv City Council of People's Deputies). From 17 January to 29 December 1990 he was chairman of the executive committee of the Kyiv City Council of People's Deputies.

From 1991 he was the head of the department for technogenic and ecological safety, emergency situations, and the design and construction of complex engineering structures at the Kyiv City State Administration.

He died on 18 September 1994 in a sanatorium in Koncha-Zaspa, and was buried at Baikovo Cemetery (plot No. 1).

== Legacy ==
A street in Vygurivshchyna-Troyeshchyna in Kyiv was named after Lavrukhin and a bronze commemorative sign was erected to him near house No. 7 on this street.
