= Left Opposition (Ukraine) =

Left Opposition Ліва опозиція
- Co-chairpersons: Petro Symonenko; Nataliya Vitrenko; Valery Soldatenko; Rudolf Povarnitsyn; Heorhiy Kryuchkov
- Founded: 15 June 2015
- Banned: 20 March 2022
- Ideology: Russophilia; Left-wing populism Left-wing nationalism Eurasianism; Pan-Slavism
- Political position: Left-wing to far-left
- Members: KPU; PSPU; Slavic Party; RPU; New Power

The Left Opposition (Ukrainian: Ліва опозиція, romanized: Liva opozytsiya; Russian: Левая оппозиция, romanized: Levaya oppozitsiya) was a Pro-Russian coalition of socio-political organizations and parties in Ukraine established in June 2015.

On 19 March 2022, the activities of the political group were suspended, and later banned, by the National Security and Defense Council during martial law.

== Leadership ==
The association was headed by 5 co-chairs:

- Petro Symonenko – First Secretary of the Central Committee of the Communist Party of Ukraine
- Nataliya Vitrenko – Chairwoman of the Progressive Socialist Party of Ukraine
- Valery Soldatenko – former director of the Ukrainian Institute of National Memory
- Rudolf Povarnitsyn – world record holder in athletics
- Heorhiy Kryuchkov – member of the Communist Party of Ukraine

== Members ==
The association includes 5 political parties, 13 public organizations and 6 individuals.

Parties:

- Communist Party of Ukraine (banned 15 December 2015)
- Progressive Socialist Party of Ukraine (banned 20 March 2022)
- "Kievan Rus'" Party
- Workers' Party of Ukraine
- Slavic Party of Ukraine
- New Power Party (entered on 24 September 2015)

Public organizations:

- Anti-Fascist Committee of Ukraine
- All-Ukrainian Union of Workers
- All-Ukrainian Union of Soviet Officers
- All-Ukrainian Women's Organization "The Gift of Life"
- Eurasian People's Union
- Association "For the Union of Ukraine, Belarus and Russia" (ZUBR)
- Association "Intelligentsia of Ukraine - for socialism"
- Leninist Communist Youth Union of Ukraine
- Labor Conference of Ukraine
- Slavic Committee of Ukraine
- Cathedral of Orthodox Women of Ukraine
- Communist Student Council
- Union of Orthodox Brotherhoods of Ukraine

Individuals:

- Petro Tolochko — National Academy of Sciences of Ukraine

It was also announced that the vicegerent of the Kyiv Pechersk Lavra, Metropolitan Pavel (Lebed), close to the Communist Party of Ukraine, could join the movement. The Socialist Party of Ukraine and the All-Ukrainian Public Movement "Ukrainian Choice" of Viktor Medvedchuk refused to participate in the association.

== Ideology ==
Political theses of the organization:

- The events of February 2014 are a "coup d'état" that led Ukraine to the loss of economic and political independence;
- The domestic and foreign policy of Ukraine is “determined by the United States of America, international financial oligarchies”;
- Ukraine is “united by a common history, culture, spirituality, civilizational values” with Russia and Belarus, but not with the US and EU countries;
- The territorial integrity and independence of Ukraine were preserved only in the conditions of the unity of "our countries (Ukraine, Russia, Belarus) and fraternal peoples";
- Organization denounces laws condemning communist ideology;
- The organization condemns the course towards the integration of Ukraine with Europe.

Goals:

- Joining the Customs Union with Russia;
- Russian as a second state language;
- "Restoration of good neighborly, equal and mutually beneficial relations" with the Russian Federation and Belarus.

== History ==
On 12 June 2015, the constituent assembly of the political movement was held in Kyiv.

== Criticism ==
=== Name theft charge ===
The eponymous socialist organization "Left Opposition" (one of the successors of the Organization of Marxists, mainly from its Trotskyist wing; its representatives create a new left party "Social Rukh") accused "representatives of the previous authorities (KPU), marginal Russophiles ("Kievan Rus") and Black Hundreds (PSPU), who parasitize on the left movement”, of stealing its name. According to the statement of its activist Nina Potarskaya, their organization is named after the leftists of the 20s with whom they associate themselves (leftists in the Central Rada and the Left Opposition in the VKP(b) opposing Stalinism).
