= Davyd Chychkan =

Ukrainian artist, anarchist and activist (1986–2025)

- Давид Чичкан
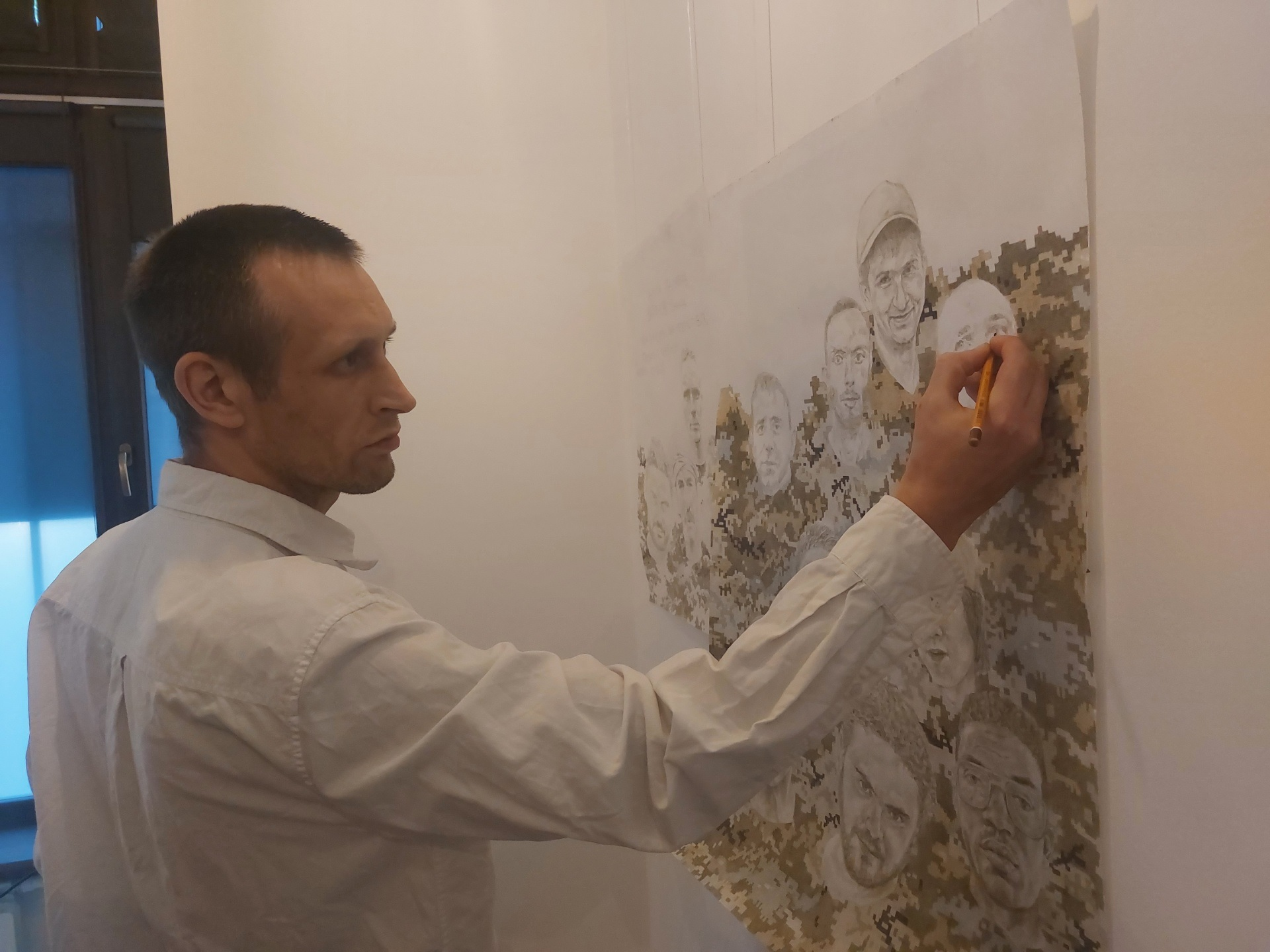
- Born: 15 April 1986; Kyiv, Ukrainian SSR, USSR
- Died: 10 August 2025 (aged 39); Zaporizhzhia Oblast, Ukraine
- Style: Watercolour graphics, posters, installation, street art
- Children: Nestor Chychkan

Davyd Illich Chychkan (Ukrainian: Дави́д Іллі́ч Чичка́н; (Note: Also known by the Russian: Давид Ильич Чичкан, romanized: David Illyich Chickhan.) 15 April 1986 – 10 August 2025) was a Ukrainian artist, anarchist and activist.

== Early life ==
Davyd Chychkan was born in Kyiv on 15 April 1986, into a distinguished artistic family. His father, Illya Chychkan, was a prominent figure of the Ukrainian New Wave and a member of the Squat Paris Commune, and his mother, Tetiana Illiahova, is a contemporary painter, graphic designer, and textile artist known for her neo-modernist tapestries. His grandfather, Arkadiy Chychkan, was a celebrated nonconformist artist; and his great-grandfather, Leonid Chychkan, was a noted socialist-realist painter during the Soviet era. Largely self-taught, Davyd developed his artistic approach independently, embracing social and political critique over formal art education. Davyd's sister, Oleksandra Chychkan, is also a contemporary artist known for her realistic collage techniques.

== Political views ==
An avowed anarcho-syndicalist, and anti-authoritarian Chychkan was a member of the Autonomous Workers' Union between 2010 and 2016 and, from 2014, a member of the libertarian organization Black Rainbow. He founded the Libertarian Club of Underground Dialectics (LCUD) in 2014, a research-based initiative examining the influence of right-wing ideology in Ukraine through artistic means. His activism was inseparable from his creative practice, seeing art as a critical tool for social transformation. In 2016, Chychkan exhibited works he had created depicting the history of the Ukrainian anarchist movement. One piece, titled "Revenge", depicted Symon Petliura's responsibility for antisemitic pogroms during the Ukrainian War of Independence, followed by his subsequent assassination by the Jewish anarchist Sholem Schwarzbard.

In February 2017, he held an exhibition titled "Lost Opportunity", which depicted the Euromaidan as an unsuccessful social revolution and criticised the nationalist and anti-communist policies of the post-revolutionary government. The exhibition was attacked by far-right activists, who accused Chychkan of "separatism" and pro-Russian sentiment. The attackers destroyed Chychkan's artwork and tagged the walls with graffiti; images of the attack, which was caught on CCTV, circulated widely in the Ukrainian media.

== Artistic practice ==
Chychkan's artistic medium spanned watercolor graphics, posters, installation, street art, performance, and text-based works, often employing a bold, anti-elitist visual language reminiscent of political posters intended for public dissemination. His imagery combined Ukrainian folk motifs such as embroidery and traditional costume with modernist geometry. In addition to blue and yellow, he introduced black (anti-authoritarianism, decentralisation), purple (feminism), and red (social equality, direct democracy) into a new Ukrainian visual canon. Davyd rejected the appellation of “artist” during his lifetime. Rather, emphasizing his anarchist non-belonging to the guild identity, he described himself as a “draftsman.”

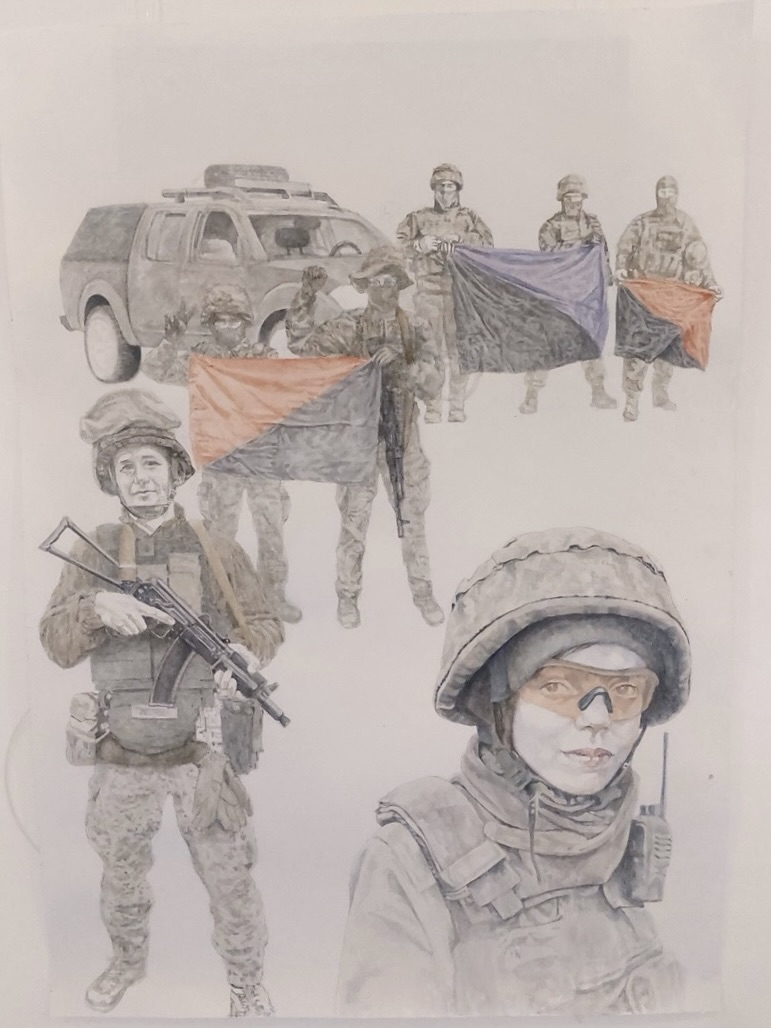
Artist's work from the exhibition «Ідентифікація. Інтерпретація. Репрезентація». Zaporizhia, Ukraine, 2023.

== Participation in the Russo-Ukrainian War and death ==
Although health issues initially prevented his enlistment in 2022, Chychkan remained artistically supportive of Ukraine's defense. In 2024, he joined the Armed Forces of Ukraine as a mortar operator, motivated by his anti-fascist, anti-imperialist ideals. His decision to serve aligned with his lifelong resistance to authoritarianism and his belief that Russia embodied modern fascism.

On 9 August 2025, Chychkan was fatally wounded repelling a Russian infantry assault in Zaporizhzhia Oblast; he died on 10 August, leaving behind his wife and infant son. During his funeral, the chief of the Russian Volunteer Corps, Denis Kapustin, confronted and assaulted openly gay serviceman Viktor Pylypenko.

== Selected exhibitions ==
- 2016 – ARTSVIT Gallery. “During the War.” Dnipro, Ukraine.
- 2017 – Kyiv Biennial. Visual Culture Research Center. Kyiv, Ukraine.
- 2017 – Visual Culture Research Center. “The Lost Opportunity.” Kyiv, Ukraine.
- 2018 – Biennale Warszawa. Warsaw, Poland.
- 2018 – Ludwig Museum of Contemporary Art, “Permanent revolution.” Budapest, Hungary.
- 2019 – Semperdepot Gallery. “Between Fire and Fire: Ukrainian Art Now.” Vienna, Austria.
- 2020 – Bereznitsky Art Foundation. “Portraits that Speak” Kyiv, Ukraine.
- 2021 – ARTSVIT Gallery. “Alternative Hryvnia.” Dnipro, Ukraine.
- 2022 – Lviv Municipal Art Center. “Ribbons and Triangles.” Lviv, Ukraine.
- 2025 – Galeria Labirynt. “Voices From Ukraine.” Lublin, Poland
- 2025 – NAMU. “Different Places." Part 2. Kyiv, Ukraine.
- 2026 – HURI. "With Ribbons and Flags." Cambridge, UK.
