= Borotba =

Association "Struggle" Об'єднання «Боротьба»
- Leaders: Serhiy Kyrychuk, Yevhen Holyshkin, Yevhen Vallenberh, Andriy Manchuk, Vasyl Tereshchuk, Viktor Shapinov, Denys Levin
- Founded: 2 May 2011
- Split from: Organization of Marxists; Communist Party; Komsomol of Ukraine
- Headquarters: Odesa
- Newspaper: Borotba
- Ideology: Communism; Marxism–Leninism; Stalinism
- Political position: Far-left
- National affiliation: Anti-Maidan
- International affiliation: World Anti-Imperialist Platform

Party flag

The Association "Struggle" (Ukrainian: Об'єднання «Боротьба», romanized: Ob'yednannia "Boroťba"; Russian: Объединение «Боротьба») is a Stalinist organization in Ukraine.

== Manifesto ==
The draft manifesto of the organization declares:

Union “Borotba” stands for Revolutionary Marxism, and its most important task – to extend Left ideology implementing Marxist methodology in the political discourse of Ukraine.

The manifest also states that the organization will support principles of anti-capitalism, internationalism, anti-fascism, political radicalism and gender equality.

== History ==
Taking the name of oppositional political party in Soviet Ukraine, from 1920 until 1925, which had merged with the Ukrainian Communist Party in 1920, Borotba has been described as part of the emerging heterogeneous New Left in Ukraine. Its leader is the Russian, Victor Shapinov, formerly active in Russian Communist Workers Party before moving to Ukraine in 2005. The association was established in May 2011 by former members of the Stalinist wing of "Organization of Marxists" (a Marxist-Leninist group formed in 2007), the Communist Party of Ukraine (KPU) and its youth wing the "Leninist Communist Youth Union of Ukraine, the "All-Ukrainian Union of Workers", the "Youth Association Che Guevara" and the "Youth against capitalism" movement, with some individual leftist activists also joining. The founding congress was attended by delegates from across Ukraine. International guests from Sweden and Russia were also present.

Borotba has cooperated with and received support from Germany's Die Linke and the Swedish Left Party's VIF aid organization. It also cooperates with the Left Front, a Russian opposition group.

== Activities ==
When the Euromaidan movement started in 2013, Borotba were critical of it from the outset. Some members of Borotba, including Dennis Levine, attempted to recruit protesters to the Confederation of Independent Trade Unions of Ukraine to fight against increased public transport costs in Kyiv. According to Svetlana Tsiberganova, they were attacked by the far-right.

Borotba claims that after the revolution of Dignity, far-right nationalists received too much power and control over important ministries and agencies including defense, anti-corruption and national security, education, agriculture and the environment, as well as the office of the Prosecutor General of Ukraine. Borotba has condemned what they considered a "Western-backed" and "fascist" February 2014 "coup" in Kyiv and called for a socialist revolution in Ukraine against the government of "ultra-nationalists and Nazis".

Borotba's members took an active role in the riots in Kharkiv in March 2014. On March 15, Borotba, the "People's Unity" and other groups called a public meeting in Kharkiv. Borotba joined Anti-Maidan protesters in storming the regional administration building, which at that time was occupied by pro-Maidan activists, and their members are accused by other Ukrainian left organisations of taking part in the beating of pro-Maidan activists, including anarchists and the well-known Ukrainian author Serhiy Zhadan. Borotba justified their action by calling the occupants members of Right Sector. On April 15, 2014, Borotba's office in Kharkiv was raided by police, which seized 20 Molotov cocktails found on its premises.

In Kharkiv, Borotba activists claim to have printed 100,000 leaflets and 10,000 posters persuading the voters to boycott the presidential election in May 2014, since they considered it unrepresentative, radical rightist, and illegitimate.

On May Day, Borotba members staged a rally in Kovalska Street in Odesa. Later in May, Borotba joined other Anti-Maidan parties (Yury Apukhtin's "Southeast" movement, the Progressive Socialist Party of Ukraine and the Communist Party of Ukraine) in rallying against the presidential elections. The leader of the Odesan regional organisation of Borotba, Aleksey Albu, fled to Russian-annexed Crimea, where he founded a "Committee for the Liberation of Odesa" on 24 May 2014 together with representatives of the Russian nationalist party Rodina and of the far-right organization "Slavic Unity".

== Criticism ==
On March 3, 2014, several left and anarchist organizations in Ukraine, including the Autonomous Workers' Union, the "Direct Action" Independent Student Union and the Left Opposition socialist organization, criticized Borotba for cooperation with conservative, nationalist and fascist, pro-Russian groups in Ukraine and spreading "overt lies and fact manipulations". In a rebuttal, Borotba rejected the accusations as "hypocritical" and "irrelevant". Borotba states that it has regularly criticized Russian authorities and organized in solidarity with left-wing Russian organizations that met with repression from the Russian authorities.

After the circulation of these allegations, the regional coordination office of the German federal Die Linke party distanced itself from Borotba and its founding member Serhei Kirichuk, who is currently living in German exile. Die Linke cancelled several events with Kirichuk, such as a panel discussion in Hamburg on the 2 July 2014 and in Kiel 3 July 2014. A book presentation which Kirichuk had helped to organise was also cancelled due to the author's ties to Russian neo-Nazi groups such as Russian National Unity and the anti-immigrant Movement Against Illegal Immigration, both of which have been banned by the Russian judiciary due to their extremist positions.

Kirichuk responded to many of the accusations levelled against the organisation, especially with regard to their support for separatists in the South and East of Ukraine, in an interview with Andrej Hunko of Die Linke.

=== Allegations of Kremlin support ===
In October 2016, the Ukrainian hacker group Cyber Hunta released more than a gigabyte of emails and other material from the office of Vladislav Surkov, one of Vladimir Putin's assistants. One of the leaked documents was a letter by Aleksei Chesnakov, a Russian political scientist and adviser to Surkov. In this email, Chesnakov provided Surkov with a list of influential media personalities upon whom Russia could count to amplify its propaganda throughout Ukraine. Three key members of the Borotba party were cited, including Borotba's leader Sergey Kiritschuk.

== See also ==
- Antifascist Committee of Ukraine
- Communist Party of the Donetsk People's Republic
- Communist Party of Ukraine
- Progressive Socialist Party of Ukraine
