= Organization of Marxists =

Organization of Marxists Організація марксистів
- Abbreviation: OM
- Chairman of the Coordination Council: Vasyl Tereshchuk
- Founded: 24 March 2007
- Dissolved: 2 May 2011
- Succeeded by: Borotba; Left Opposition
- Newspaper: Labor Solidarity; Against the Current
- Ideology: Communism; Marxism; Revolutionary socialism Factions: Marxism–Leninism; Trotskyism; Neo-Marxism; Left communism Maoism
- Political position: Left-wing to far-left

Website
- marx.org.ua

The Organization of Marxists (Ukrainian: Організація марксистів, romanized: Orhanizatsiya marksystiv; OM) was a radical left-wing political association in Ukraine.

== Organization establishment ==
The organization of Marxists was created at the founding conference on March 24–25, 2007. The basis of the new organization was made up of several political groups and information publications in Ukraine, in particular, the Che Guevara Youth Association, groups around the editorial offices of the contr.info and communist.ru websites and the Against the Current magazine. Some members of the association at one time left the youth league of the Communist Party of Ukraine, the Leninist Communist Youth Union of Ukraine, and the All-Ukrainian Union of Workers, others left the Workers' Resistance, the Ukrainian section of the Committee for a Workers' International.

One hundred and fifty people attended the founding conference, including about ninety delegates from left-wing publications, political groups, and trade union organizations from many cities in Ukraine. The delegates of the conference adopted the Declaration and Statute of the OM, and also elected the OM Coordinating Council consisting of 21 people. Vasily Tereshchuk was elected Chairman of the Coordination Council.

The founding conference was attended by guests from France (Revolutionary Communist League), United Kingdom (International Marxist Tendency) and Poland, as well as representatives of Russian left-wing organizations and structures - ICC "Left Politics", the Socialist League Vpered, the Russian Communist Workers' Party – Revolutionary Party of Communists, the Union of Communist Youth of the Russian Federation and the Russian Communist Youth League. Director of the Institute of Globalization Problems (now the Institute of Globalization and Social Movements) Boris Kagarlitsky, who was also present at the founding conference, described it as "a very important and useful lesson", noting that "organizationally Ukrainian comrades were significantly ahead of us".

== Ideology ==
The OM Declaration, in particular, states that it unites in its ranks all those who stand on the position of the "revolutionary theory of Marxism" and "recognition that the path to socialism lies through the socialist revolution, the elimination of private ownership of the means of production, the destruction of the bourgeois state bureaucracy and involving all workers in the management of society".

At the time of the creation of the organization, representatives of various currents of revolutionary socialism acted within it - Trotskyists, Stalinists and supporters of the existence of socialism in the USSR, Maoists, neo-Marxists, left communists (supporters of the theory of state capitalism in the USSR). The decisions of the OM Conference, held in December 2007, on this matter say: “At the current stage, the attitude to the question of the “nature of the USSR” is not the main and decisive one for developing a program and building an organization of Marxists”.

== Activities ==
Activists of the Organization of Marxists took part in the work of the Network of Film Clubs of Social and Classical Cinema. In February–March 2008, the Network hosted the Anti-Fascist Film Festival. The organization has been active in the Save the Old Kyiv initiative “Let's Protect the Old Kyiv”, together with other (also predominantly left-wing) activists and local residents. Actions against infill development were also carried out in other cities (Cherkasy, Sevastopol).

The OM preferred non-parliamentary methods of political struggle. Thus, in 2007 and 2009, the organization set out to campaign against all parties and candidates in early parliamentary and presidential elections, respectively.

The organization participated in campaigns against the adoption of the new labour code and amendments to the Law of Ukraine "On Higher Education", as well as against the increase in tariffs and attacks on the social rights of workers in the context of the economic crisis. Among such actions, in which the OM took part, were the “March of Rogues” and “Enraged Passengers”, a protest action against the increase in prices for public transport in Kyiv on November 9, 2008, dispersed by Berkut. In 2009 and 2010, she participated in alternative May Day demonstrations in Kyiv together with a number of other left-wing organizations (“Social Alternative”, “Anti-Fascist Action”, the Revolutionary Confederation of Anarcho-Syndicalists, “New Left”, “Youth Against Capitalism”, Komsomol members expelled from the LKSMU, animal rights activists) and independent trade unions (Direct Action, Labor Defence).

As part of an international campaign of solidarity with Cuba, OM campaigned for the release of the Cuban Five from US prisons.

OM, together with the New Left organization, organized the Preparatory Assembly of the European Social Forum held in Kyiv on June 6–8, 2008. Participated in the work of the ESF in Malmö, Sweden, September 17–21, 2008 as part of the Ukrainian delegation.

Local OM organizations worked to establish contacts with workers' collectives and independent trade unions. The largest success of the organization in this matter was the support of the employees of the Kherson Machine-Building Plant in their struggle against the liquidation of the enterprise (2009). Activists of the Organization of Marxists were at KhMZ from the very beginning of the events and actively contributed to the development of the action, and as a result, they tried to create a Coordinating Committee of struggling labor collectives. During the "Italian" strike at the Poltava Mining and Processing Plant (2010), members of the OM actively supported the workers' struggle, which ended in the defeat and dismissal of most members of the unregistered trade union "People's Solidarity".

== Dissolution ==
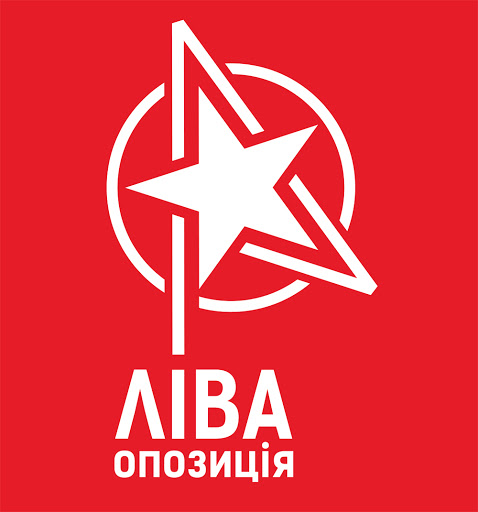
Flags of Borotba and Left Opposition

By the beginning of 2011, the Marxist Organization had virtually ceased to exist. Part of its activists (considered as the “Stalinist wing” of the OM and including people from the structures of the Communist Party and the Komsomol) took part in the creation of the Borotba association, the other (anti-Stalinist, mainly Trotskyist) - of the Left Opposition socialist association, which after Maidan participates in the creation of a new leftist party Social Movement (originally the "Assembly of the Social Revolution"), the labor movement in Kryvyi Rih and Kyiv. The name of OM's theoretical journal, "Against the Current", was left to a small left communist group.

The contradictions between the two wings of the OM, based on ideological differences, different political culture and approaches to the search for allies, have been growing for a long time, but finally came to light during the discussion on the creation of a broad left political subject. The reason for the final disengagement was the concealment by the future founders of "Borotba" from the rest of the organization of financial assistance received by the Organization of Marxists from the Left Party of Sweden.

== Press ==
The organization published the newspaper "Working Solidarity" (together with the independent Lviv trade union "Protection of Labor", which united more than a thousand residents of workers' hostels) and the theoretical magazine "Against the Current"

In 2007, the Moscow publishing house "Algorithm" in the series "Left March" published books by OM activists, left-wing publicists Viktor Shapinov "Imperialism from Lenin to Putin" and Andrei Manchuk "The Heirs of Che Guevara"
