= Soldatenko =

Soldatenko (Ukrainian: Солдатенко) is a Ukrainian-language surname. Notable people with the surname include:

- Veniamin Soldatenko
- Rostislav Soldatenko
- Valeriy Soldatenko
