= Social Movement (Ukraine) =

Political movement in Ukraine

Social Movement Соціальний рух
- Abbreviation: SR; SotsRukh
- Chairman of the Council: Snizhana Oleksun
- Founded: 1 May 2015
- Registered: 8 June 2016
- Preceded by: Assembly of Social Revolution
- Ideology: Democratic socialism Anti-imperialism; Anti-capitalism; Anti-Putinism; Socialist feminism Socialism
- Political position: Left-wing to far-left
- European affiliation: Central-Eastern European Green Left Alliance
- International affiliation: Fourth International
- Slogan: «A free person instead of a free market!» (Ukrainian: «Вільна людина замість вільного ринку!»)

Website
- rev.org.ua

The Social Movement (Ukrainian: Соціальний рух, romanized: Sotsialnyi rukh; (Note: Alternatively transliterated as Sotsialnyy rukh.) abbreviated SR) is a Ukrainian left-wing community organization founded in 2015, which stands on the principles of democratic socialism, opposing capitalism and xenophobia. It operates in the largest cities of Ukraine (Kyiv, Kryvyi Rih, Lviv, Odesa, Dnipro, Kharkiv). The group is aspiring to become a grassroots political party and came to some prominence during the 2022 Russian invasion of Ukraine when it called upon the international left to support the Ukrainian resistance to Russian imperialism and campaigned against wartime curtailing of certain labour rights by the Ukrainian government.

== History ==
The Social Movement was based on the Assembly of Social Revolution initiative, created in the wake of the 2013-2014 Euromaidan protests by activists of social, trade union and left-wing movements, in particular the anti-Stalinist Marxist organization Left Opposition (not to be confused with the party of the same name). The latter originated from the Trotskyist wing of the Organization of Marxists joined by independent leftists, for instance, former members of Direct Action, a syndicalist students' union.

During the Maidan protests of 2013-2014, representatives of the Left Opposition circulated the "Ten Points" of social demands, which declared the cause of the country's unresolved problems to be the system of oligarchic capitalism, and came to the conclusion about the need for a political force of the left-democratic base, which would promote a socially oriented agenda in the interests of the working class of the entire country crossing over regional or language divisions. Individual candidates of the Assembly of Social Revolution ran for the Kyiv City Council in the 2014 local election, but the main activity was in the area of street politics and protest performances.

The congress on May 1, 2015 visited by May 68 veteran Alain Krivine laid the foundation for the organizing committee of the future party called "Social Movement" and the public organization of the same name, which was registered on June 8, 2016. The Social Movement was conceived as a broad association open to various members of Ukrainian New Left — including democratic, libertarian, and revolutionary currents of socialism ranging from social democrats to anarchists. Among others, some of the editors of the critical left-wing publications Commons (Spilne) and Politychna Krytyka also take part in it.

== Activities ==
Activists of the Social Movement operate in the trade union organizations of the Confederation of Free Trade Unions of Ukraine (Independent Trade Union of Mineworkers of Ukraine, Free Trade Union of Railway Workers of Ukraine) and the Federation of Trade Unions of Ukraine (Professional Union of Workers of the Construction and Building Materials Industry of Ukraine, Trade Union of Crane Workers). The organization provides legal support on issues of labor rights, endorses feminist, environmentalist, "pirate" initiatives, and also promotes such social movements as the grassroots movement of nurses and medical workers "Be Like Nina".

The organization opposes what it considers neoliberal and anti-social government measures. It organizes rallies against commercialization of public sector, pro-business labor reforms, public transport fare hikes and far-right violence. The group regularly supports trade union and human rights actions, March 8 feminist marches and climate change demonstrations trying to bring anti-capitalist criticism to these topics. It considers necessary to democratize public life, decentralize politics, stand up for women's and LGBTQ+ rights, fight against patriarchy and discrimination based on nationality, etc.

Speaking against the austerity policy and the closure of budget institutions, the organization's activists took part in the protests for the preservation of jobs at the Pivdenmash aerospace plant in Dnipro (2015-2016), in the 350-kilometer protest march of doctors from the city of Romny, who protested against the closure of the local polyclinic (2016), and in defense of the rights of members of the independent trade union at the Kurenivske trolleybus depot in Kyiv (since 2016). The Social Movement also supported the protesting staff of the Kryvyi Rih hospital during the labor conflict.

The Social Movement provides support to the workers of the metallurgical plant ArcelorMittal Kryvyi Rih, mining and processing plants and other enterprises of Kryvyi Rih, who since 2017 have been campaigning to raise wages to the level of 1000 euros and improve working conditions at workplaces. Manifesting solidarity with the workers of Kryvyi Rih, the organization chose this city to hold a number of its May Day actions (in particular, in 2018 and 2019), and also participated in the study of the amount of withdrawal of profits from the export of iron ore from Ukraine to offshore zones. A SR representative, Vitaly Dudin, was a self-nominated candidate in the 2019 parliamentary election for the 31st electoral district in Kryvyi Rih.

The Social Movement is critical of the Ukrainian decommunisation legislation but also of the 'old left' parties in Ukraine as being Stalinist, socially conservative, pro-business, and pro-Russian. Activists of the SR have repeatedly faced attacks from the Ukrainian far-right who tried to disrupt their events, e.g. anti-fascist rallies in memory of Stanislav Markelov and Anastasia Baburova murdered by Russian neo-Nazis or presentations of books like Left-Wing Europe, an account of European leftist parties and movements, or Leon Trotsky's works collection in Ukrainian.

The group also conducts educational activities on various topics of domestic and international politics, political theory and practice (capitalism and the labor theory of value, workers' rights and the labour movement, history of socialist movements in Ukraine and abroad, lessons from the international Left like the rise and fall of Syriza or Jeremy Corbyn's and Bernie Sanders' campaigns).

== International cooperation ==
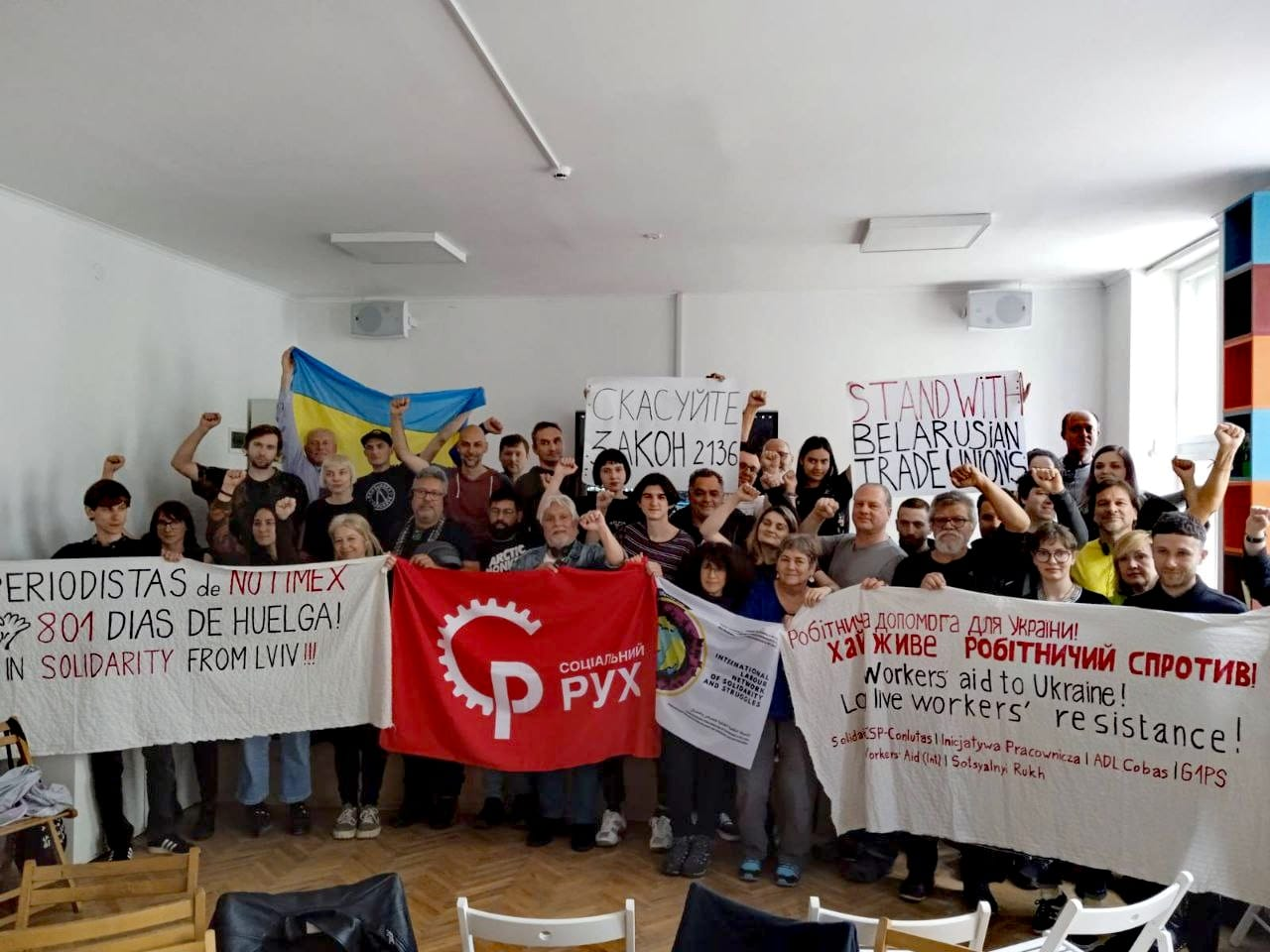
International trade union conference in Lviv hosted by the Social Movement on 2022 May Day.

The Social Movement maintains links with a number of foreign socialist parties, organizations and initiatives. On the eve of the 2022 Russian invasion of Ukraine, the Social Movement called on left-wing foreign countries for anti-war solidarity against the threat of Russian imperialism, which it also condemned in a joint statement with the oppositional Russian Socialist Movement. A letter to the Western Left from Kyiv written by one of the Social Movement activists who joined Territorial Defense (Teroborona) units gained international publicity.

With the beginning of the full-scale Russo-Ukrainian war, Sotsialnyi Rukh began organizing campaigns of international support for the people of Ukraine in the circles of the foreign democratic and revolutionary left which included trade union convoys of humanitarian aid and the promotion of such political demands as the cancellation of Ukraine's foreign debt. Its activists helped to establish the European Network for Solidarity with Ukraine and to draft “The Right to Resist” feminist manifesto.

The solidarity delegation that attended the conference of the SR in Lviv, dedicated to the development of the European Network for solidarity with Ukraine, included deputies and other prominent political figures from France (Olivier Besancenot, Catherine Samary, Mireille Fanon Mendès-France), Switzerland (Stéfanie Prezioso), Poland (Paulina Matysiak), Finland (Veronika Honkasalo), Denmark (Søren Søndergaard), and Argentina (Juan Carlos Giordano). On 17 September 2022, the Social Movement held a national conference in Kyiv attended by international guests.

On the basis of condemnation of the invasion of Ukraine, parties, initiatives and activists from different countries of the world, from Brazil to Hong Kong and Japan, established contacts with the SR. In the neighboring countries, the Social Movement closely cooperates with the anti-war Russian Socialist Movement and the Polish party Left Together (Lewica Razem). Besides Lewica Razem, SR's campaign for debt cancellation is also supported by a number of other left-wing forces in Europe (mainly Central and Northern), including the Red–Green Alliance in Denmark, the Left Alliance in Finland, and the Left Bloc in Portugal.

Even earlier, the Social Movement established active cooperation with the British Ukraine Solidarity Campaign, thanks to which the problems of the Ukrainian labor movement were voiced in the British Parliament by deputies from the Labour Party, the Green Party of England and Wales, the Scottish National Party, and the Plaid Cymru. John McDonnell MP has praised the Social Movement for being “at the front of supporting progressive, trade union and environmental campaigns, strikes and demonstrations”. SR hosted a delegation of British left-wing activists and trade unionists, including Adam Price, Mick Antoniw, Julie Ward and Paul Mason, days before the Russian intervention.

Like the core of the Social Movement itself, many of its contacts also come from the Trotskyist tradition like the British Alliance for Workers' Liberty, the French New Anticapitalist Party and Ensemble! or the Brazilian Socialism and Liberty Party and United Socialist Workers' Party. Thus, the organization applied for observer status in the Fourth International (post-reunification). It also maintains contacts with a number of other international associations and foreign trade union organizations, for example, the anarcho-syndicalist All-Polish trade union Workers' Initiative. For its part, the SR organized and participated in street actions of solidarity with social and democratic protests abroad, protests in Belarus and Kazakhstan, the Kurdish liberation movement, etc.

== Program principles ==
The program of the Social Movement unites the broad Ukrainian democratic left on the basis of socialism, anti-capitalism, and feminism. It outlines the main 12 points of political and social transformation:

1. "People's rule instead of oligarchs' rule": expanding the role of democratic institutions in society by introducing elements of direct and electronic democracy, effective legislation on referendums, increasing the representation of workers in government bodies.
2. "Socializing the Economy": Nationalization and Workers' control of Strategic Enterprises and Banks. Implementation of democratic planning in the economy.
3. "Worker control and decent work": representation of workers in the governing bodies of enterprises, increasing the role of trade unions and public associations in their management. Legal and stable labor relations, regulation of flexible forms of employment, social package at the expense of the employer.
4. "Tax justice": taxation at a rate of 50% for the purchase of luxury objects worth more than ₴1 million. Progressive taxation of incomes of individuals and corporations. Seizure of all assets of "offshore companies" until the legality of the invested funds is proved.
5. "Assistance to peasants": development of village infrastructure and creation of jobs by the state within agricultural enterprises.
6. "Social lustration": restriction of the opportunity to hold positions in state administration bodies and run for councils to certain groups of the population, such as capitalists, top managers of large financial and industrial groups, deputies of the last two convocations.
7. "Public control over budget funds": development of a system of participatory budgets for communities, decentralization of budget funds and powers. "Open accounting" of state bodies, budgetary institutions and monopolistic companies.
8. "Overcoming the coercive apparatus": successive reduction of costs for the coercive apparatus. Guarantee of peaceful assembly and freedom of association regardless of political views, opposition to any form of censorship and attack on civil rights.
9. "Health, education, progress": free education and medicine, creation of a platform for active equal cooperation of scientists, managers and the public. Increasing state funding of theoretical and applied research.
10. "Ensuring people's sovereignty": refusal of further cooperation with the International Monetary Fund and other international financial institutions and closure of their representative offices in Ukraine. Requirement to write off foreign debt.
11. "Equality above all": affirming the equality of cultures of all national groups. Ensuring the representation of women in all spheres of public life. Protection against discrimination based on gender, language, nationality, race, sexual orientation, etc. Social integration of migrants and providing asylum to refugees.
12. "Ensuring peace": defending the lives of civilians and Ukraine's territorial integrity, fighting against Russian and any other imperialism, restoring destroyed territories and their inclusive reintegration. Disarmament and disbandment of all illegal armed and paramilitary formations.

== Sources ==
- Kim, Seongcheol. Radical democracy and left populism after the squares: ‘Social Movement’ (Ukraine), Podemos (Spain), and the question of organization // Contemporary Political Theory. — Basingstoke: Palgrave Macmillan, 2020. — Volume 19. Issue 2. — P. 211—232.
- Samary, Catherine. Une gauche ukrainienne en construction sur plusieurs fronts // Contretemps, 18 October 2022.
