= Black Rainbows =

Black Rainbows may refer to:

- Black Rainbows (Brett Anderson album), 2011
- Black Rainbows (Corinne Bailey Rae album), 2023
- "Black Rainbows", a 2017 song by Cut Copy from Haiku from Zero
- "Black Rainbows", a 2012 song by Miracle Musical from Hawaii: Part II

== See also ==
- Black Rainbow, a 1989 psychological thriller film
- Beyond the Black Rainbow, a 2010 science fiction horror film.
- Black Rainbow, a Ukrainian anarcho-syndicalist organisation
