= Visual Culture Research Center =

Cultural centre in Kyiv, Ukraine

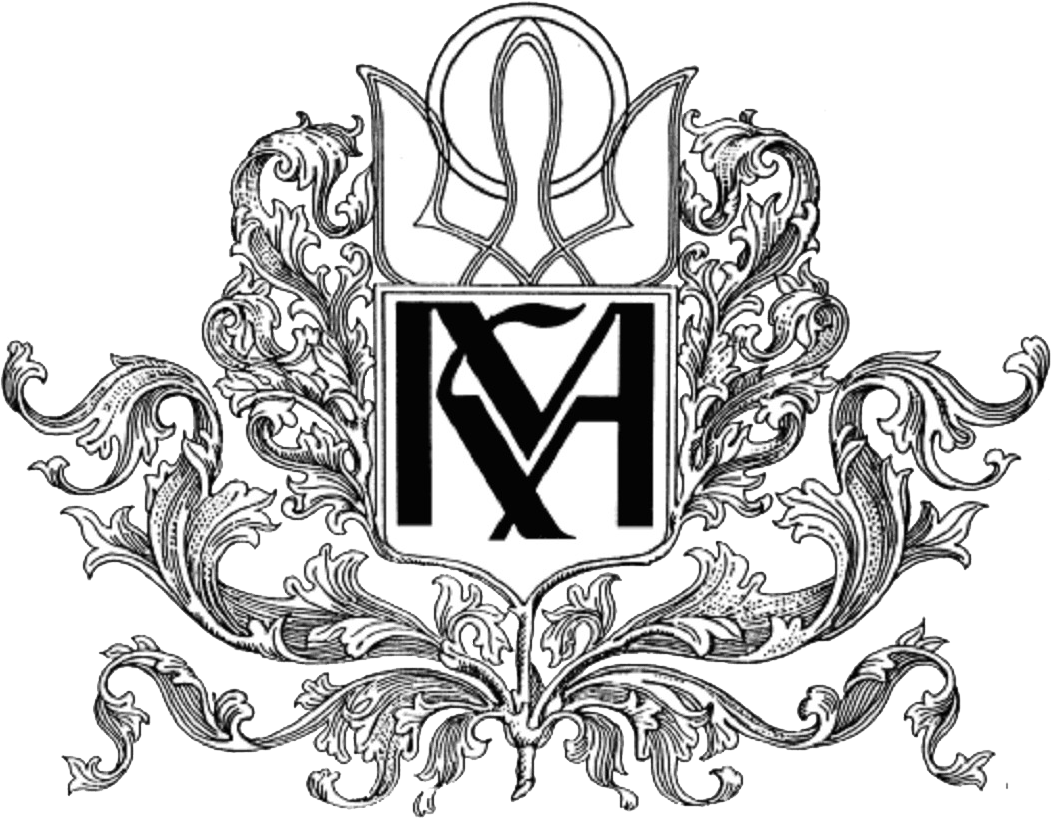
Logotype for the National University of Kyiv-Mohyla Academy

The Visual Culture Research Center (Ukrainian: Центр візуальної культури) (VCRC) is an independent cultural institution in Kyiv, founded in 2008 as a platform for interaction between academic, artistic, and activist communities. The VCRC is an independent public organization engaged in publishing and exhibition activities, scientific research, conducting public lectures, discussions, and conferences. From 2008 to 2012, it operated at the National University of Kyiv-Mohyla Academy.

In 2015, the Visual Culture Research Center received the Princess Margriet Award from the European Cultural Foundation.

In 2017, the VCRC was the organizer and curator of the "Kyiv International – Kyiv Biennale 2017," which included a series of exhibitions, lectures, discussions, and workshops with the participation of well-known international thinkers and artists.

== History ==
=== Establishment ===
Among the co-founders of the VCRC were Vasyl Cherepanyn, Nadia Parfan, Inna Sovsun, Olga Bryukhovetska and others. For some time the activities of the center were funded by membership fees, during the first years the participants worked on a volunteer basis.

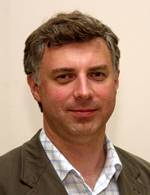
Serhiy Kvit

Beginning in 2008, the center was based at the National University of Kyiv-Mohyla Academy.

=== Suspension of the center's operation in February 2012 ===
On February 7, 2012, the VCRC opened the contemporary art exhibit entitled "Ukrainske Tilo" ("Ukrainian Body"), which explored bodily existence in Ukrainian society. The show exhibited a mix of art pieces, including some that contained nude images and drawings. On February 10, 2012, Serhiy Kvit—president of the National University of Kyiv-Mohyla Academy (NaUKMA), where the exhibit was held—visited the show. He promptly ordered the closure of the exhibition, telling the media afterwards that "The exhibition is not closed, it is just locked."

Kvit stated his actions were motivated by the fact that at the exhibition you can see not art, but "shit" or "a disparate set of pornographic images." He later commented that the reason for closing the exhibition was not the content, but "procedural problems". On February 29, the exhibition was dismantled on schedule. Works of artists Oleksandr Volodarsky, Nikita Kadan, Sasha Kurmaz, Lada Nakonechnaya, Anatoliy Byelov, Yevheniya Belousets, Mykola Ridny, Volodymyr Say and others were presented there.

On February 23, 2012, by the decision of the Academic Council of the Kyiv-Mohyla Academy, the operation of the NaUKMA Visual Culture Research Center was suspended. On February 27, a protest action against the closure of the Center took place outside the Kyiv-Mohyla Academy. On the same day, the director of the Visual Culture Research Center Vasyl Cherepanin decided to resign, handing over control to Inna Sovsun, after which Serhiy Kvit stated that the work of the center would be resumed.

The suspension in the operation of the center was supported by the Honorary President of the Kyiv-Mohyla Academy Viacheslav Briukhovetsky.

The center was defended by David Eliott, curator of the First Kyiv Biennale, former President of Poland Aleksander Kwaśniewski, philosophers Slavoj Žižek, Judith Butler and Jacques Rancière, translator Andrii Riepa, artist Oleksandr Volodarsky.

On March 12, 2012, Serhiy Kvit issued an order according to which the Visual Culture Research Center was deprived of premises in the Old Academic Building of NaUKMA due to the emergency condition of the building.

On March 29, 2012, by the decision of the Academic Council of the Kyiv-Mohyla Academy, the Visual Culture Research Center was liquidated, in particular, among the main reasons for the closure of the center was the following: "deliberate damage to the reputation of NaUKMA", "substitution of academic criteria by ideological and political", "intolerance of different opinions and views", "public discrediting of colleagues", "systematic misleading of the NaUKMA administration".

The opening and presentation of the new program of the center was announced on April 26 in the premises of the Zhovten (October) cinema within the framework of the Seventh Berlin Biennale.

== See also ==
- Direct Action (trade union)
- Commons (magazine)
- European Cultural Foundation
- Krytyka Polityczna

== Additional references ==
- The Visual Culture Research Center
- "We didn't know what we were going for". Kyiv Visual Culture Research Center received a prestigious award in Slovenia — December 14, 2018.
- Deprivation of the office of the NaUKMA Center for Visual Culture
- Anastasia Moskvichova. What's wrong with the "Ukrainske Tilo"? // Radio Svoboda, February 17, 2012.
- Katerina Botanova. Hostages of the revolution // Criticism. 2012, No. 3 (173).
- Andriy Movchan. Defended the Cinematheque. Let's defend the VCRC! // Direct action, February 25, 2012.
- Andriy Merhel. On the minefield "Mohylyanka" // Mirror of the week. Ukraine, No. 12, March 30, 2012.
- Ginanne Brownell. Ukrainian Art World Gets Political // The New York Times, March 23, 2012.
