= Oleksandr Volodarsky =

Ukrainian activist (born 1987)

Oleksandr Viktorovych Volodarsky
- Олександр Вікторович Володарський
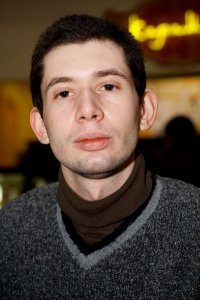
- Born: 17 August 1987 (age 39); Voroshilovgrad, Ukraine, Soviet Union
- Other name: "Shiitman"
- Education: University of Erlangen-Nuremberg
- Known for: Performance art
- Spouse: Ascania Alonso
- Website: www.shiitman.ninja

Oleksandr Viktorovych Volodarsky (also known as Shiitman; born 17 August 1987) is a Ukrainian publicist, performance artist, and blogger. In the past, he was a left-libertarian political activist, a member of the independent student union "Direct Action", the "Autonomous Workers' Union" and the All-Ukrainian anarchist association "Libertarian Coordination". He is a programmer by profession. From 2002 to 2009 he studied in Germany and since November 2009 he has lived and worked in Kyiv.

== Action in front of the Verkhovna Rada ==
Formerly active in LiveJournal (LJ), Volodarsky gained popularity after a performance on 2 November 2009, against the National Expert Commission for the Protection of Morality, which the activist accused of censorship and attempts to restrict freedom of speech. During the performance, Oleksandr Volodarsky and his partner, who remained anonymous, imitated sexual intercourse in front of the Verkhovna Rada, while a third participant addressed a press conference.

After the rally, an already dressed Oleksandr Volodarsky was arrested, charged under Art. 296 part 2 of the Criminal Code of Ukraine: "hooliganism committed by a group of persons." The artist spent a month and a half in SIZO 13 (Lukyanovsk SIZO). While he was in custody, numerous actions were held in his support.

Volodarsky does not consider his act as hooliganism and insists on full justification. He repeatedly reported violations during the investigation, wrote numerous complaints about the investigator's actions, and sent a letter to Ukrainian President Viktor Yanukovych, information that was reprinted by many Ukrainian publications. The action and the arrest provoked a discussion in Ukrainian society and, ultimately, contributed to the intensification of the campaign against censorship, which included such Ukrainian writers as Serhiy Zhadan and Yuriy Andrukhovych.

== Other actions ==
After his release from the pre-trial detention center, Oleksandr Volodarsky held a number of other artistic and political performances, which were covered by the blogosphere and the media. Special mention should be made of "Censorship of Audiences" at the presentation of Oles Ulyanenko's book "The Woman of His Dreams" and the action "Orthodoxy or Law", held in solidarity with victims of clerical censorship. At the end of September, as part of the Judicial Experiment exhibition on criminal cases against activists, Volodarsky asked for a scar with the words "This is not Europe for you" - words that the investigator said during his first interrogation. The action "Consecration of the Icon of Stalin" in the Kyiv Pechersk Lavra, which was conducted by Volodarsky as part of the situationist group AKT (UOC officially denied the fact of "consecration").

== Written work ==
Oleksandr Volodarsky is published in the magazines Avtonom and Telekritika, Political Critique (Russian and Ukrainian editions) and others. Volodarsky's prison notes were planned to be published by the Ultraculture publishing house. They were published under the title Chemistry.
