= Kirill Savchenkov =

Russian artist based in Moscow (born 1987)

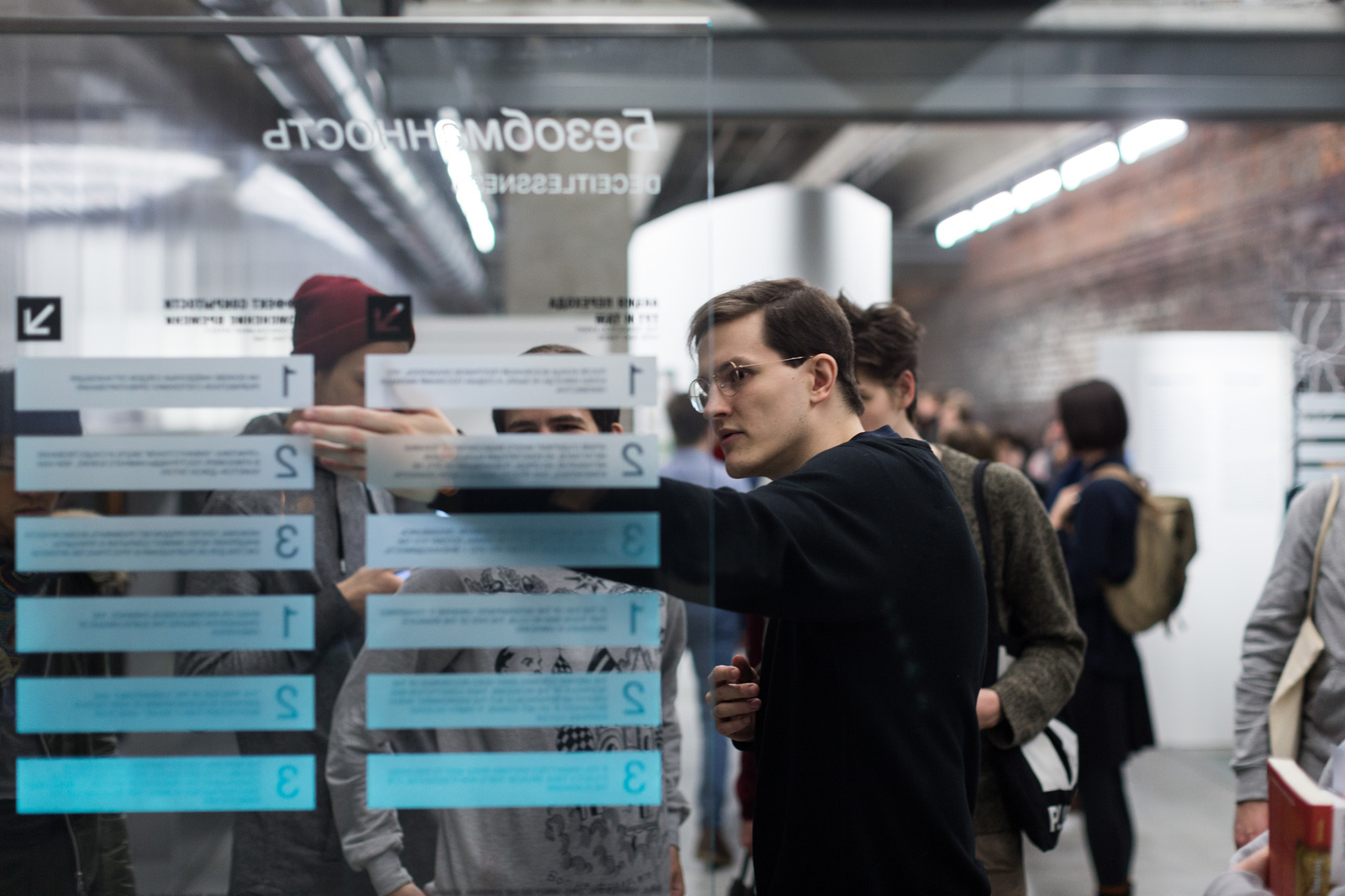
Kirill Savchenkov (2017).

Kirill Savchenkov (Russian: Кирилл Савченков, born May 30, 1987) is a Russian artist based in Moscow.

== Life and work ==
Kirill Savchenkov studied at the Moscow Technical University of Communications and Informatics (2004–2009), and the Rodchenko Art School (2009–2012, Oleg Klimov' Documentary Photography Studio and Roman Minaev's Intermedia Studio). He works with various media including photography, video, text, installation and various performative practices engaging the audience (tours, workshops). His practice often deals with themes of memory and relations between the city space and human mentality, exploring various aspects of life in suburbia, contemporary information streams and the way they affect subcultures and communities.

In February 2017 Savchenkov's project Memory Center was featured in the exhibition Toward the Source at Garage Museum of Contemporary Art. In December 2015 – January 2016 he presented his Horizon Community Workshop project—a series of seminars, where he acted as a coach teaching visitors survival techniques— at the Agency of Singular Investigations (ASI), CCI Fabrika.

Earlier in 2015, he also presented Museum of Skateboarding within the public art program Expanding Space. Artistic Practice in the Urban Environment, organized in Moscow by V-A-C Foundation. The total installation explored the relations and mutual influences between the urban environment and skateboarding. As part of the project, Savchenkov took visitors on tours around the Victory Park—the main skateboarding area in Moscow. In summer 2016, the project was exhibited as part of Power and Architecture program at Calvert 22 in London.

In 2014, Savchenkov presented two projects devoted to suburbs: Atlas (featured in the exhibition Semiconductors at Stella Art Foundation) and Umwelt. In the words of curator and critic Anastasia Fyodorova, ‘based on the artist’s childhood and teenage memories, and his analysis of the failed utopian ideology [of the Soviet Union], Atlas and Anabasis explore the post-Soviet suburbia: the spaces at the periphery of cities, which are easily recognizable by their standardized housing estates.’

As Savchenkov himself explains, 'many people find suburban landscapes sterile and anonymous, and I wanted to disprove that. I wanted to show that every housing block and every vacant lot contain certain histories and memories.'

Similar spaces and phenomena were explored in Savchenkov's earlier two-part project Anabasis (2013), which consisted of a series of walks in Bitsevsky Park and an exhibition in a former Cinema Hall in a Yasenevo. AMOK, Savchenkov's graduation project at the Rodchenko Art School, presented at the MAMM exhibition Without Exception, was devoted to serial murders that had taken place in Moscow suburbs and consisted of found images mixed with the artist's own photographs in a single visual stream.

In 2010, Savchenkov had his first solo exhibition at FotoDepartament in Saint Petersburg.

Since 2013, he has been a lecturer at the Rodchenko Art School in Moscow. Savchenkov received the Architecture Grand-Prix at the Silver Camera Prize in 2011 (for his project Void) and was shortlisted for MACK First Book Award and Kassel Photobook Award for his book Iceberg in 2014.

His works are held in the collections Multimedia Art Museum, Moscow, and Stella Art Foundation.

== Solo exhibitions ==
- 2016 – Museum of Skateboarding. Calvert 22, London, UK
- 2015 – Horizon Community Workshop. Agency of Singular Investigations (ASI), CCI Fabrika, Moscow, Russia
- 2015 – Echo. Svilova Gallery, online platform
- 2014 – Avalanche. FotoDepartament, Saint Petersburg, Russia
- 2013 – Anabasis. Vdokhnovenie Cultural Center, Moscow, Russia
- 2012 – To Fight the Fury (with Sasha Kurmaz), Paperworks Gallery, Moscow, Russia
- 2010 – 207'’. FotoDepartament, Saint Petersburg, Russia

== Selected group exhibitions ==
- 2017 – Toward the Source. Garage Museum of Contemporary Art, Moscow, Russia
- 2016 – New Blood. Winzavod CCA, Moscow, Russia
- 2015 – Expanding Space. Artistic Practice in the Urban Environment. V-A-C Foundation, GES-2, Moscow, Russia
- 2015 – Metogeography. The State Tretyakov Gallery, Moscow, Russia
- 2014 – Truthfinders. Viktoria Gallery, Samara, Russia
- 2014 – Semiconductors. Stella Art Foundation, Moscow, Russia
- 2014 – The Rustling of Angels. Electromuseum (Rostokino Exhibition Hall), Moscow, Russia
- 2014 – Twelve Thinking Photographers. The Parallel Program of Manifesta 10, First Cadets Corpus, Saint Petersburg, Russia
- 2014 – Look inside Her. Zamoskvorechye Exhibition Hall, Moscow Russia
- 2013 – Distance. CCI Fabrika, Moscow, Russia
- 2013 – Stability. Ghosts. Parallel Program of the 5th Moscow International Biennale of Contemporary Art
- 2011 – Young Photographers 2011 1/2. The Edge. FotoDepartament, Saint Petersburg, Russia
- 2011 – Performative Archive. E. K. ArtBureau, Moscow, Russia
- 2011 – Uninvented Photography. Multimedia Art Museum, Moscow, Russia
- 2010 – Young Photographers 2010 2/2. Time. FotoDepartament, Saint Petersburg, Russia
- 2010 – Photographie russe historique, moderne et contemporaine 1850–2010. Beckel Odille Boïcos Gallery, Paris, France
- 2010 – Sense and Sensibility. Artplay, Moscow, Russia
