= Strangerfestival =

- Location: Amsterdam, Netherlands
- Established: 2007

StrangerFestival is an annual film festival held in Amsterdam, Netherlands, devoted to short videos from 60 seconds up to 500 seconds. The festival was established in 2007 and is initiated, organised and coordinated by the European Cultural Foundation.

The main goal of StrangerFestival is to support young people's video explorations on issues that matter to them.

The 2008 edition of the festival was opened by Princess Laurentien of the Netherlands and held in the Westergasfabriek, in West Amsterdam. Ron von Jacobs, of Belgium, won the award for "Best of the World." A young Dutch woman with Down syndrome, Nanda Swiersema, made a short film about being teased which garnered a lot of attention in the Dutch media.
