= European Cultural Foundation =

Cultural foundation in the Netherlands

- Abbreviation: ECF
- Formation: 1954; 72 years ago
- Founder: Denis de Rougemont
- Founded at: Geneva, Switzerland
- Legal status: Foundation
- Headquarters: Amsterdam, Netherlands
- Region served: Europe
- Website: Official website

The European Cultural Foundation (ECF) is a Netherlands-based independent cultural foundation. Its mission is to “make a tangible impact on civil society, citizen initiatives, public opinion and policy proposals to combat the fragmenting forces jeopardising peace and social progress in Europe”.

== Organisation ==
The European Cultural Foundation was set up in Geneva in 1954 by the Swiss philosopher Denis de Rougemont. ECF's first President was Robert Schuman, one of the principal architects of the European Economic Community, which later evolved into the European Union.

From the start, ECF focused on implementing a European grants programme, based on the idea of putting culture at the intersection of education, social sciences and history.

In 1960, ECF moved to Amsterdam at the initiative of Prince Bernhard of the Netherlands, who was ECF's President from 1955-77.

Since then ECF’s programme has evolved with the shifting dynamics of European politics. In the 1960s, ECF focused on the future of Europe through a youth forum on education and an initiative called Plan Europe 2000. In the 1970s, the emphasis shifted towards student mobility – and from 1987 to 1995, ECF managed the Erasmus student exchange programme.

As Europe continued to expand, ECF's focus turned to the cultural dimension of European integration and enlargement – encompassing the wider European Neighbourhood and including capacity building work in the Mediterranean area and Eastern Europe.

The foundation's work continues to support cultural exchange and creative expression across wider Europe today, through advocacy work, media activism, partnerships, events and grant programmes. This included STEP travel grants, which encouraged mobility; and the TANDEM Cultural Exchange programme, which facilitated the exchange of cultural managers.

Between 2013 and 2017, ECF worked in close collaboration with cultural organisations in Croatia, France, Poland, Moldova, Spain and Sweden as part of the Connected Action for the Commons network this has led to a series of Idea Camps in France, Sweden and Spain, inspiring several special editions of Eurozine.

Princess Laurentien of the Netherlands is currently the President of ECF and Extraordinary Member of ECF’s Supervisory Board. Since November 2018, André Wilkens has been the director of the foundation.

ECF is a registered charity and is funded by Vriendenloterij (previously BankGiro Loterij) and Nederlandse Loterij in partnership with Prins Bernhard Cultuurfonds.

== ECF Awards ==
The European Cultural Foundation has initiated multiple awards, to recognise the work of artists and academics.

From 2004 to 2013, ECF granted the Cultural Policy Research Award in collaboration with ENCATC (European network on cultural management and policy) and the Bank of Sweden Tercentenary Foundation. The award served to encourage talented researchers to address issues, relevant to Europe, in the academic field of cultural policy studies. The award consisted of a €10,000 cash prize to enable the winners to conduct a research project. Laureates include Nina Obuljen Koržinek (elected Minister of Culture in the Government of Croatia in 2016), Sophia Labadi, Claire Bullen, Davide Ponzini, Aleksandar Brkić, Christiaan De Beukelaer, and Višnja Kisic.

From 2008 to 2019, ECF granted the ECF Princess Margriet Award for Culture to recognise cultural change-makers across Europe. The annual award is made in honour of Princess Margriet of the Netherlands, who served as ECF President from 1984 to 2007. Past laureates include the late cultural theorist Stuart Hall, museum director Charles Esche and film director John Akomfrah.

== Current Programmes ==
In 2019 the European Cultural Foundation celebrated its 65th anniversary. In a dedicated publication 'Stories of Europe' many Europeans from ECF networks look back together on ECF's achievements. As many other ECF publications this publication is freely available online.

Since the outbreak of the Covid'19 pandemic in 2020 ECF set up an emergency fund: Culture for Solidarity Fund. With other foundations contributing this fund supports artists and cultural makers across Europe. Since the Russian war in and on Ukraine this pulled fund became a tool to support the Ukrainian cultural sectors.

Other programmes include: The Europe Challenge - launched by the European Challenge in 2020 to offer support, resources and funding to libraries and communities – to help explore how people can meet, live together and work in the Europe of today.

The European Pavilion - ECF's ambition to facilitate a space that encourages experimentation and reflection on Europe. It set out to support a European network of arts and cultural organisations that, through artistic and educational projects, offers the opportunity to explore ideas for a future Europe.

Re:framing Migrants in European Media – a pilot programme to change current media narratives by assuring appropriate media representation of migrant and refugee communities across Europe.

The Cultural Deal for Europe campaign was launched in November 2020 together with Culture Action Europe and Europa Nostra Europa Nostra as a call to the European Union to place culture at the heart of its political vision and ambition for years to come.

== See also ==
- Strangerfestival
- Visual Culture Research Center
