= Sasha Kurmaz =

Ukrainian artist and photographer (born 1986)

- Sasha Kurmaz (2023)
- Born: Oleksandr Kurmaz (Ukrainian: Олекса́ндр Володи́мирович Ку́рмаз); 9 September 1986 (age 39); Kyiv, Ukrainian SSR, Soviet Union
- Known for: photography, art
- Website: sashakurmaz.com

Sasha Kurmaz (Ukrainian: Са́ша Ку́рмаз; born 9 September 1986) is a Ukrainian interdisciplinary artist and photographer.

== Early life and education ==
Kurmaz was born and raised in Kyiv, Ukraine (former Ukrainian SSR, Soviet Union), where he remains based. His artistic trajectory began within Kyiv's graffiti scene during the early 2000s as a member of the collective Psia Krew (Ukrainian: Пся Крев), which operated at the intersection of classical and post-graffiti styles. He received technical training at the Kyiv Electromechanical College (Bachelor's degree, 2005) before studying design at the National Academy of Government Managerial Staff of Culture and Arts (Master's degree, 2008).

== Artistic practice ==
He uses various media and approaches in his artistic practice, such as photography, collage, video, public intervention, and situations, as well as diverse strategies to engage the audience through collaborative practice. He also actively experiments with found and archival images and develops conceptual artists’ books. The main focus of his work is social and political issues and global challenges that Ukrainian society has faced in recent years.

Despite the wide range of mediums the artist uses to realize his artistic projects, photography remains one of his primary tools. He often stages his photography using cardboard or paper, adding "found images" from newspapers or other print sources to contribute to the atmosphere of his works.

Kurmaz's works have been widely presented at many international exhibitions and festivals, including exhibitions at the Akademie der Künste Berlin (Germany), Künstlerhaus Vienna (Austria), Latvian Museum of Photography (Latvia), Galeria Arsenał (Poland), Museum Folkwang (Germany), Ujazdowski Castle Centre for Contemporary Art (Poland), Museum de Fundatie (The Netherlands), NRW-Forum Düsseldorf (Germany), Forum Stadtpark (Austria), C/O Berlin (Germany), Skovde Art Museum (Sweden), Centre Photographique Marseille (France), Albertinum – Staatliche Kunstsammlungen Dresden (Germany), The DOX Centre for Contemporary Art (Czech Republic), ZKM Center for Art and Media (Germany), Stadtgalerie Künstlerhaus Lauenburg (Germany) and many others.

== Projects ==
=== Red Horse (2022–2025) ===
This project has the form of a visual diary and consists of various collages that tell first-hand about life in Ukraine and how this life is constantly changing under the influence of the destructive force of war. In November 2025, a book dedicated to this project was published by the Swiss publishing house Éditions Images Vevey. In 2026, the book received the Kraszna-Krausz Photography Book Award.

=== The Temple of the Transfiguration (2022) ===
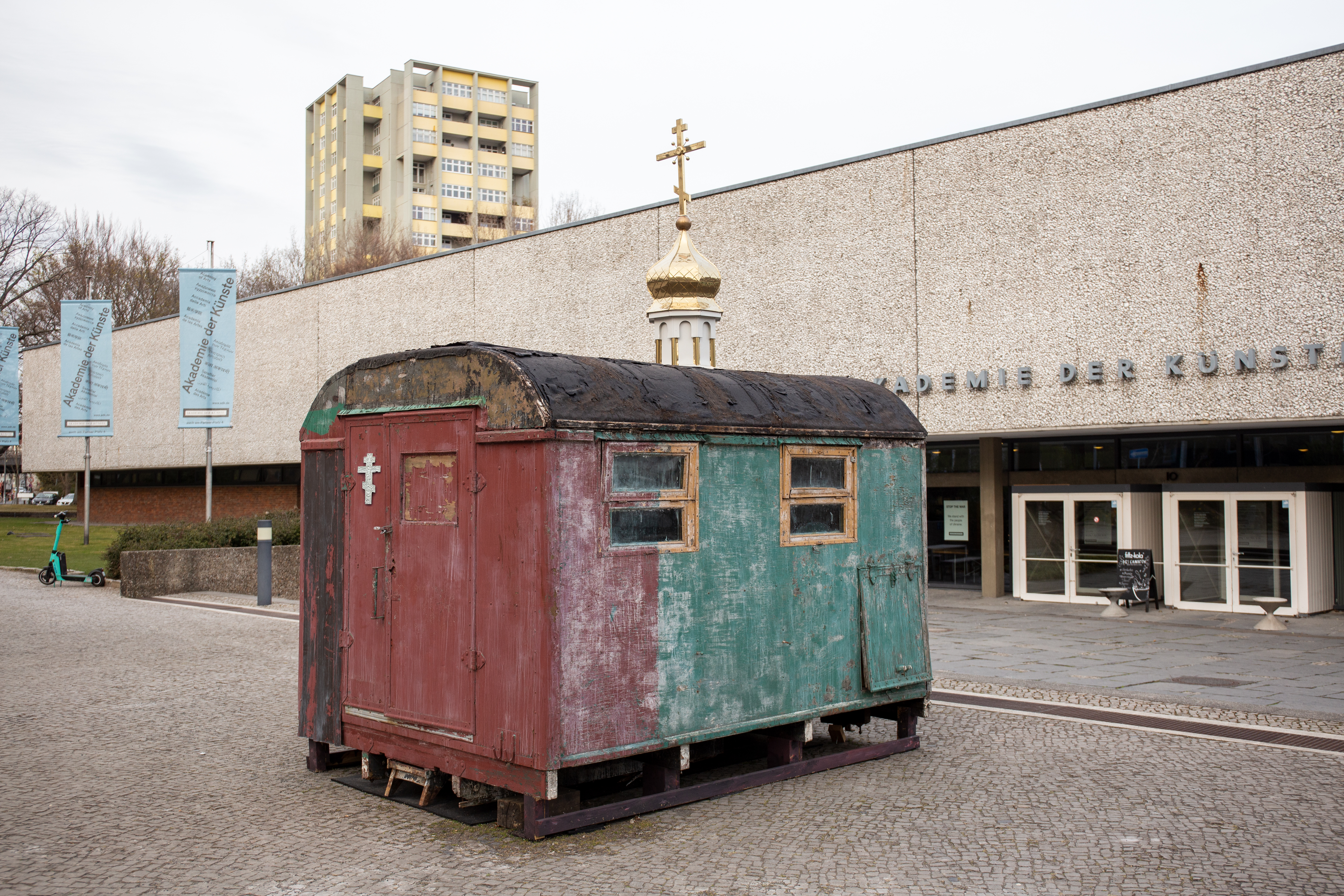
Sasha Kurmaz. Installation—The Temple of the Transfiguration. Akademie der Künste, Berlin, Germany, 2022.

The Temple of the Transfiguration is an installation in public space in which the author explores the influence of the Ukrainian Orthodox Church of the Moscow Patriarchate on Ukrainian society, as well as the role of this church in the Russian-Ukrainian war. The temple installation was created based on a booth used on a Russian military truck GAZ-63.

=== I Sleep For A Revolution (2013) ===
This is a video work in which the author captures the sleeping state of activists in the Kyiv City State Administration building when it was turned into a protest base during the Revolution of Dignity in Kyiv.

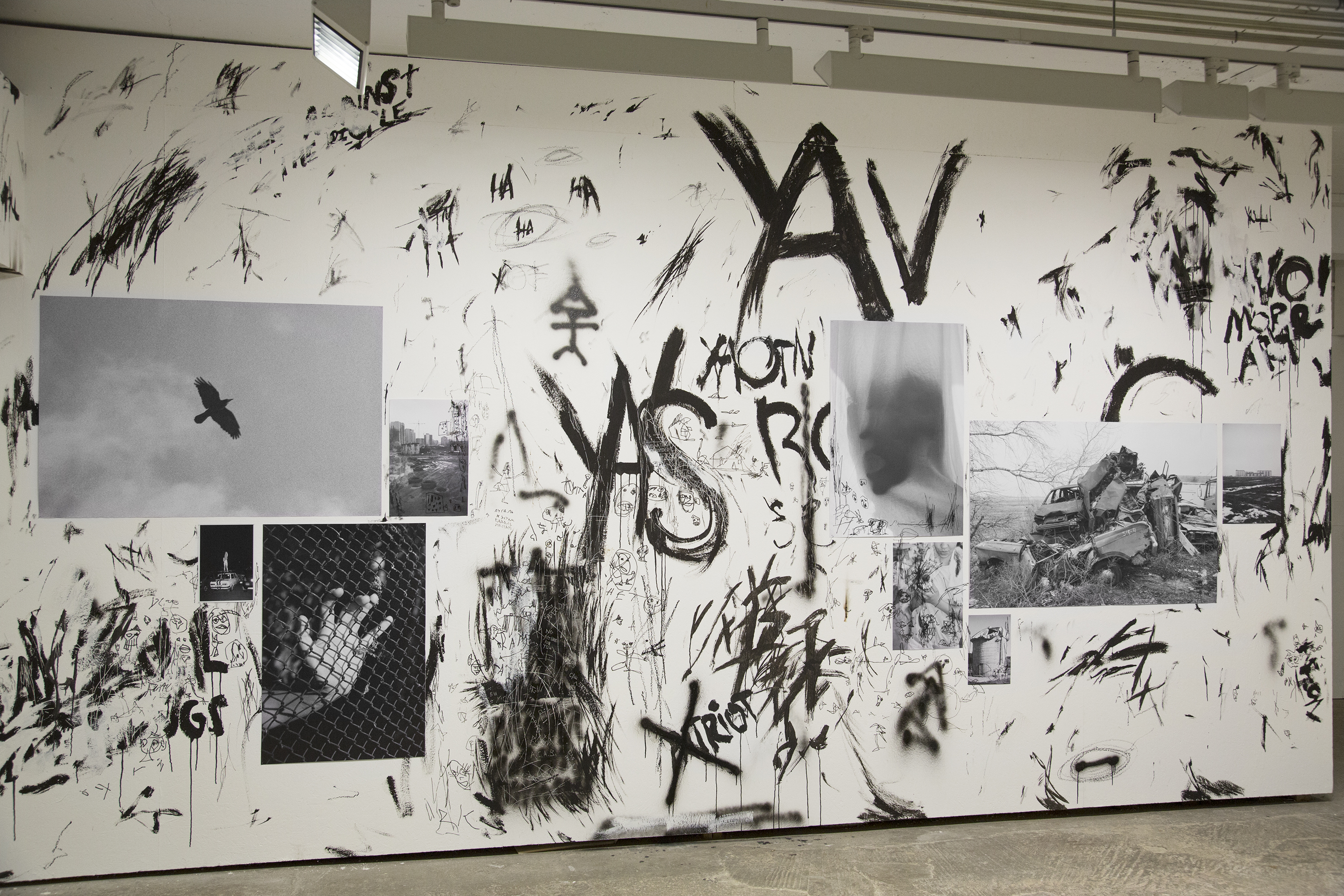
Sasha Kurmaz. Installation view, FLIP A COIN exhibition. OXYD Kunsträume, Winterthur, Switzerland, 2018.

== Awards ==
He was awarded the C/O Berlin Talent Award in 2016 (Germany), the Kazimir Malevich Art Award in 2020 (Ukraine-Poland), and the Grand Prix Images Vevey in 2023 (Switzerland).

== Fellowships and residencies ==
The Gaude Polonia Scholarship (Poland), CEC ArtsLink (United States), KulturKontakt (Austria), the Ujazdowski Castle Centre for Contemporary Art (Poland), HIAP (Finland), Westwerk (Germany), Kulturhaus Villa Sträuli (Switzerland), Akademie der Künste (Germany), Artist Residency Schloss Balmoral (Germany).

== Selected exhibitions ==
- 2011 — Mystetskyi Arsenal / Mala Gallery. "Newspeak." Kyiv, Ukraine.
- 2011 – Paperworks Gallery. "The Frenzied Urge to Struggle." (with Kirill Savchenkov) Moscow, Russia.
- 2012 — VCRC at NaUKMA. "Ukrainian Body." Kyiv, Ukraine.
- 2012 — W139. "Catch A Glimpse of Me." Amsterdam, Netherlands.
- 2013 — CCA Ujazdowski Castle. "Ukrainian News." Warsaw, Poland.
- 2013 – Survival Kit – International Contemporary Arts Festival. Riga, Latvia.
- 2013 — FORMAT Photography Festival. Derby, United Kingdom.
- 2013 — ZKM Museum of Contemporary Art. "Global Activism." Karlsruhe, Germany.
- 2014 — Künstlerhaus. "I Am Drop In The Ocean." Vienna, Austria.
- 2014 — Yermilov center. "After The Victory." Kharkiv, Ukraine.
- 2015 – Biel/Bienne Festival of Photography. Biel/Bienne, Switzerland.
- 2015 – Kaunas Photography Festival. Kaunas, Lithuania.
- 2015 — Saatchi Gallery. "UK/raine." London, United Kingdom.
- 2016 – Kunsthalle Exnergasse WUK. "Into the Dark." Vienna, Austria.
- 2016 – Gallery Awangarda BWA Wrocław. "Dependence Degree." Wrocław, Poland.
- 2016 – The Art Museum of Skovde. "Between Revolution and War." Skövde, Sweden.
- 2017 — NRW Forum. "Perfect Storm." Düsseldorf, Germany.
- 2017 — Czech Center. "Baby, I Like It Raw." New York City, United States.
- 2017 – Galeria Arsenał. "Central by East Central." Białystok, Poland.
- 2017 – Bien Urbain Public Art Festival. Besançon, France.
- 2017 – BIG Biennale. Geneva, Switzerland.
- 2018 – OXYD Kunsträume. "Flip A Coin." Winterthur, Switzerland.
- 2019 — Mystetskyi Arsenal. "Obabich." Kyiv, Ukraine.
- 2019 — Latvian Museum of Photography. "The Body of Propaganda." Riga, Latvia.
- 2019 – Semperdepot Gallery. "Between Fire and Fire: Ukrainian Art Now.” Vienna, Austria.
- 2020 – Galería Santa Fe. "Escaleras Futuras." Bogotá, Colombia.
- 2021 — PinchukArtCentre. "Remember Yesterday." Kyiv, Ukraine.
- 2021 – Galeria Arsenał. "Na początku był czyn!" Białystok, Poland.
- 2021 – Forum Stadtpark. "One Monument in Time." Graz, Austria.
- 2022 — Akademie der Künste. "What Matters." Berlin, Germany.
- 2022 — Museum Folkwang. "What is depicted here?" Essen, Germany.
- 2022 — PHOXXI / Deichtorhallen Hamburg. "The New Abnormal." Hamburg, Germany.
- 2022 – DOX Centre for Contemporary Art. "The Pain of Others." Prague, Czech Republic.
- 2022 – Beta – Timișoara Architecture Biennial. Timișoara, Romania.
- 2023 – Centre Photographique Marseille. "Ukraine(s)." Marseille, France.
- 2023 — Albertinum – Staatliche Kunstsammlungen Dresden. "Kaleidoscope of (Hi)stories. Ukrainian Art 1912–2023." Dresden, Germany.
- 2023 – The 18th Venice Biennale of Architecture. The Pavilion of Ukraine. Venice, Italy.
- 2023 – Foto Arsenal Wien. "Crossing Lines. Politics of Images." Vienna, Austria.
- 2023 – 5th edition of the Kyiv Biennial. Uzhhorod, Ukraine.
- 2023 — Museum de Fundatie. "Kaleidoscope of (Hi)stories: Kunst aus der Ukraine.” Zwolle, Netherlands.
- 2023 – Robert Capa Contemporary Photography Center. "Crossing Lines. Politics of Images." Budapest, Hungary.
- 2024 — Centro Fotográfico Manuel Álvarez Bravo. "Beyond the Silence." Oaxaca, Mexico.
- 2024 – Stadtgalerie Künstlerhaus Lauenburg. "Contemplating the Empathy of Others." Lauenburg, Germany.
- 2025 – Jam Factory Art Center. "Beyond the Silence." Lviv, Ukraine.
- 2025 — C/O Berlin. "Documentary in Flux." Berlin, Germany.
- 2025 — Galeria Labirynt. "Voices From Ukraine". Lublin, Poland.

== Publications ==
- Wasted Youth. Sasha Kurmaz. Osnovy Publishing (2026). ISBN 978-617-8535-35-3
- Red Horse. Sasha Kurmaz. Éditions Images Vevey (2025). ISBN 978-2940624355
- Empathy of Others. I lost my library (2025). ISBN 978-617-8247-54-6
- 13 Stories of War. Ukrainian Warchive (2024). ISBN 978-9152793886
- Orthodox Chic. Sasha Kurmaz / Alexander Burlaka / Alexey Bykov. Osnovy Publishing LLC (2020). ISBN 978-9665008545
- Method. C/O Berlin Talents 38. Sasha Kurmaz / Svea Bräunert. KEHRER Verlag (2016). ISBN 978-3868287080
- Concrete and Sex. Sasha Kurmaz. PogoBooks (2013). ISBN 978-3942547260
