= Antifascist Committee of Ukraine =

Antifascist Committee of Ukraine (AFKU) Антифашистский комитет Украины (АФКУ)
- Leader: Heorhiy Buiko
- Founded: 2006
- Headquarters: Kyiv
- Ideology: Anti-Maidan; Soviet patriotism Left-wing nationalism Russian nationalism
- National affiliation: Left Opposition (2015–2022)

The Antifascist Committee of Ukraine is an anti-fascist organization, closely linked to the banned Communist Party of Ukraine.

== History ==
The organization was established in 2006. Its founding chair was former People's Deputy of Ukraine Heorhiy Buiko, who is a secretary of the Central Committee of the Communist Party of Ukraine.

In 2011, it protested in Kyiv against nationalism, alongside the Ukrainian Communist Party and Russian Bloc Party.

On March 3, 2014 the organization supported the annexation of Crimea by the Russian Federation from Ukraine.

On April 18, 2014 the organization accused the acting Government of Ukraine of driving the nation to war, economy down, cutting on salaries and pensions, de facto destruction of education, healthcare, culture and armed forces.

In February 2018, two members of the Committee and of the Communist Party were attacked by Right Sector activists.

In March 2022, the Morning Star reported that two activists in the Committee, Mikhail Kononovich (leader of the Leninist Communist Youth Union of Ukraine, and his brother, Aleksander Kononovich, who had previously been attacked by National Corps/C14 activists, were arrested by the Ukrainian security service, the SBU on charges of “pro-Russian views and pro-Belarusian views"; the Greek Communist Party raised their case in the European Parliament.

== Organization ==
As of 2015, it was a member of the Left Opposition.

Its deputy head is Oleksandr Kalyniuk, also the secretary of the Lviv regional committee Communist Party of Ukraine.
