= Heorhiy Kryuchkov =

Ukrainian politician (1930–2021)

- Георгій Крючков
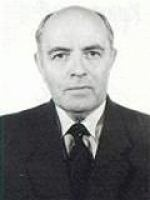
- Official portrait, 1998

Member of the Verkhovna Rada
- In office 12 May 1998 – 25 May 2006

First Secretary of the Odesa Regional Committee of the Communist Party of Ukraine
- In office 5 November 1998 – 3 April 1990
- Preceded by: Anatoliy Nochovkin
- Succeeded by: Rouslan Bodelan

Personal details
- Born: 20 October 1929 Husarka, Pershotravneve Raion, Ukrainian SSR, Soviet Union
- Died: 4 November 2021 (aged 92)
- Party: CPSU; KPU

Heorhiy Korniyovych Kryuchkov (Ukrainian: Георгій Корнійович Крючков; 20 October 1929 – 4 November 2021) was a Soviet and Ukrainian politician. In 1989, he was elected as a People's Deputy of the USSR. A member of the Communist Party of the Soviet Union and later the Communist Party of Ukraine, he served in the Verkhovna Rada from 1998 to 2006.

== Early life ==
Kryuchkov was born on 20 October 1929 in Husarka, which was then part of the Ukrainian SSR in the Soviet Union. In 1951, he graduated from the Yaroslav Mudryi National Law University. He then began working for the Ministry of Justice of the Ukrainian SSR.

== Political career ==
In 1955, he took on various positioins in the Komsomol within Zaporizhzhia Oblast, which he did until 1959. He was then promoted to party positions within the oblast, which he did until 1966. He then started working in the apparatus of the Central Committee of the Communist Party of Ukraine. In 1972, he became Head of the Department of Organizational and Party Work of the Central Committee of the Communist Party of Ukraine, which he did until 1985. For the next three years he was then the deputy head of that same department, but for the state in Moscow. Upon returning, from 1988 to 1990, he was First Secretary of the Odesa Regional Committee and for a year until the collapse of the Soviet Union he was the Assistant to the Chairman of the Council of Ministers of the Ukrainian SSR.

During the 1998 Ukrainian parliamentary election, he was elected a People's Deputy of Ukraine in the Verkhovna Rada as a member of the Communist Party of Ukraine. He was re-elected to the 4th convocation during the 2002 elections, and he then became the Chair of the Committee on National Security and Defense, which he chaired until the end of his term in 2006.
