= Workers Resistance =

Ukrainian political party

Workers Resistance (Ukrainian: Робітничий спротив, romanized: Robitnychyi sprotyv) was a Trotskyist political party in Ukraine. It was a member of the Committee for a Workers' International (CWI). The party was founded in 1994.

== Fraud ==
In February 2000, leading members of Workers' Resistance began contacting various socialist political parties and internationals via the internet. They chose groupings without contacts in Ukraine, and used various invented party names. Posing as these organizations, they began discussions with them and talked about joint work. Most of the organizations were keen to develop links, and responded to requests for money to translate and print documents, purchase computer equipment or maintain an office.

As the fraud progressed, they undertook some poor quality translations, to satisfy their partner organizations. Some organizations met members of Workers Resistance in person, without suspecting that they were not who they claimed to be. With the apparent proliferation of socialist groups in Ukraine, the fraudsters began inventing polemics between their various front organizations. This complex web of activity, and the small amounts of money actually obtained, has led to suggestions that the fraud may have been intended to discredit certain groups, or may even have simply been run for entertainment value.

Suspicions grew in several organizations as the complex fraud proved difficult to maintain. The Coordination Council of the Workers Movement (a Maoist organization in Ukraine) attempted to alert the League for the Fourth International to the fraud, but were not believed. The situation was finally exposed in 2003, when a small Group of Proletarian Revolutionaries-Collectivists informed different left-wing activists and groups about the fraud.

In an attempt to cover their tracks, the fraudsters had produced documents in the names of members of the Coordination Council of the Workers Movement, but people who had met the perpetrators were able to identify them and they soon admitted the fraud.

=== CWI response ===
The seven individuals involved in the fraud were expelled from the CWI in September 2003 following an investigation by the CWI's International Secretariat which first learned of the allegations against the Ukrainian section earlier in the summer.

On August 29, 2003, the CWI issued a statement on the affair which said, in part:

In late July and early August, allegations concerning the leadership of the Kiev and Ukrainian organisations of the CWI were brought to our attention. Serious charges of fraud against this leadership in their dealings with many left groups internationally were made and since then CWI representatives have investigated them. Unfortunately, we have found that, in substance, these allegations appear to be true. Indeed, when confronted with these charges, the leadership of the Ukrainian organization admitted that they had pursued a policy of deception in their dealings with many left groups. This was done, they claim, in order to obtain “information” about these groups, but primarily to gather funds from these organizations.

Up to this time, the leadership of the CWI and the international secretariat (IS), as well as the international executive committee (IEC), were completely unaware that these methods were being used. They are totally at variance with the longstanding methods, both politically and organisationally, practised by our international. As soon as it was confirmed, by these individuals in Kiev, that these dishonest methods had been used, we took the step of suspending the leadership of the Kiev and Ukrainian organisations. Since then, in a visit to Kiev, an investigation has been conducted by the CWI and we are now in possession of a more detailed picture of what the Ukrainian leadership has done over a period of years in their dealings with other political revolutionary groups.

The statement concluded with the decisions to:

1. Immediately suspend Oleg Vernik, a member of the IEC of the CWI, and to recommend his expulsion to the next meeting of the IEC. To immediately expel Boris Pastukh, Zakhar Popovich, Alexander Zvorskii, Yuri Baranov, Yaroslav Ganzenko, Alexei Aryabinskii. These individuals are primarily responsible for this shameful incident. They will have the right to appeal against their expulsion to the appropriate bodies.

2. To suspend immediately the Kiev and Ukrainian organisations. We recognise that within the ranks of the Ukrainian organisation are some very good comrades, some of whom acquiesced to the dishonest methods that were used and some of whom were ignorant of what was done. We intend to recommend to the CIS section of the CWI that the rebuilding of the Ukrainian organisation is undertaken, in conjunction with the IS of the CWI. This will have to be done in such a way as to completely separate the organisation that comes out of this from the methods of the previous leadership, who will have no influence on the direction, deliberations or actions of any Ukrainian or Kiev organisation which adheres to the CWI. A full political discussion will be necessary in Kiev and Ukraine on the perspectives of the CIS organisation as a whole and the CWI, in order to ensure that those who wish to remain in the CWI do so on a clear political and organisational basis, in consonance with the ideas of the CWI.

Since then, Workers Resistance in Ukraine has been reorganized and there has been an attempt to rebuild the party around its remaining members.

=== Organisations affected ===
Organisations which were affected by the fraud (with the name of the purported Ukrainian party in brackets) include:

- Communist Party of Great Britain (Provisional Central Committee) (Communist Struggle Group)
- International Bolshevik Tendency (Young Revolutionary Marxists)
- International Bureau for the Revolutionary Party (Radical Communists)
- International Committee of the Fourth International (Workers Revolutionary Party) (Workers Revolutionary League)
- International Workers' Committee (Ukrainian Workers Committee)
- League for a Revolutionary Communist International (Workers Power – Young Revolutionary Marxists)
- League for the Revolutionary Party/Communist Organisation for a Fourth International (Revolutionary Workers Organisation)
- League for the Fourth International (Revolutionary Communist Organisation)
- News & Letters (Ukraine Workers Group)
- Socialist Labor Party (Socialist Labor Party of Ukraine)
- Workers Liberty (Ukrainian Workers Tendency)
- World Socialist Movement (World Socialist Party)

The International Bolshevik Tendency lobbied events organised by CWI member groups asking for a refund of the money they had donated, but the CWI did not return the money, as they claimed they did not have it.

== Sources ==
- International Bolshevik Tendency – Cast list – Fraud Against the Workers' Movement
- LRP-COFI – CWI Group Guilty of Ukraine Fraud
- Workers Liberty – Scam in the Ukraine
- CWI statement on the fraud
- Leftist Parties of the World – Ukraine
- Chickens Come Home to Roost in Kiev
