= Autonomous Workers' Union =

Ukrainian political organisation

- Автономна спілка трудящих
- Established: 2011; 15 years ago
- Dissolved: 2016; 10 years ago
- Type: Political organisation
- Headquarters: Kyiv
- Location: Ukraine
- Website: avtonomia.net

The Autonomous Workers' Union (Ukrainian: Автономна спілка трудящих; AWU) was a Ukrainian anarcho-syndicalist political organisation. Established in 2011 by former members of Direct Action, it participated in a series of campaigns against privatisation and the rollback of labour rights in Ukraine. It intended to establish a trade union federation, but it never gained enough recruits in a single workplace to register a trade union. Instead its activism was focused on propagating cultural liberalism, against rising conservative and reactionary attitudes in Ukraine. The AWU participated in the Euromaidan movement, gaining particular prominence in Kharkiv, where it joined the local Maidan's coordination council. After the victory of the Revolution of Dignity, it aligned itself against the anti-Maidan movement and took a pro-Ukrainian position against the Donetsk and Luhansk People's Republics, which it considered counterrevolutionary and fascist. In the wake of the Euromaidan, the organisation declined and eventually dissolved, with its members splitting over how to respond to the War in Donbas.

== Establishment ==
In 2008, the government of Viktor Yushchenko proposed a new Labour Code, which would have extended the work day to 10 hours and made dismissals easier to carry out. Activists who agitated against it, successfully preventing its passage through the Verkhovna Rada, were inspired by their experiences in extra-parliamentary pressure politics to establish a new political organisation to resist the state through direct action. In 2011, the Autonomous Workers' Union (Ukrainian: Автономна спілка трудящих; AWU) was established by anarchist, Marxist and syndicalist activists from the Ukrainian trade union movement. It was composed largely of former activists from the student union Direct Action, who hoped to establish an organisation for adult workers to capitalise on Direct Action's popularity.

== Early activities ==
The AWU was an anarchist and revolutionary syndicalist organisation. Its aim was to build an anarcho-syndicalist trade union federation. It brought together people from various different trades, including workers in the media, construction and education sectors. However, it ultimately never established a single trade union, as it was unable to recruit the three people in a single workplace necessary to register a union. It thus remained a relatively small organisation, and many activists engaged in unofficial trade union organising without legal protection.

According to Ukrainian research Volodymyr Ishchenko, much of the AWU's activism involved promoting cultural liberalism within the Ukrainian new left. The AWU believed that the collapse of the Ukrainian Soviet Socialist Republic had led to a decline in progressive values such as feminism and internationalism, which were replaced by conservatism and nationalism in the newly-independent Ukrainian state. The AWU positioned itself against the cultural conservatism of both Russian and Ukrainian nationalism, as well as the old Ukrainian left. The AWU opposed Ukrainian nationalism and considered the independent Ukrainian state to be a "sub-imperialist state", in which oligarchs used nationalism to divide the Ukrainian working-class and separate them from their counterparts in the west and in Russia. Ishchenko described it as the "most ideologically coherent anarchist organisation" in Ukraine at the time.

The AWU participated in dozens of protests in the lead up to the Euromaidan. It campaigned against rollbacks of labour rights and state pensions, against the privatisation of Ukrainian Railways, and against a bill that attempted to limit freedom of assembly. It organised demonstrations in support of precarious workers in the Ukrainian cultural sector, as well as striking workers at Reuters and Changhong. It also supported political prisoners in Ukraine and other countries, and protested against the Zhanaozen massacre in Kazakhstan. In 2012, female members of the AWU spoke at the International Women's Day demonstration in Kyiv, raising the profile of women activists as part of a strategy by the growing feminist movement. Through its website and various cultural events, the AWU has published and propagated anarchist theory, and analysed societal developments such as the rise of far-right politics in Ukraine. Initially based largely in Kyiv, in May 2013, the AWU established a branch in Kharkiv, which grew to become its largest branch and staged a series of protests.

== Participation in Euromaidan ==
Activists of the Kharkiv AWU, announcing the opening of an occupied social centre in 2014

Following the outbreak of the Euromaidan protests, an AWU spokesperson commented that protesters had an idealised view of the European Union as an institution with high income, rule of law and a lack of political corruption. They also said that pro-Europeanism motivated the protestors less than opposition to Viktor Yanukovich and anti-Russian sentiment, which had become the main driving motivations after the police crackdown against the movement. Their own opposition to police brutality and political repression motivated the Kyiv branch of the AWU to join the protests and lend the movement their critical support. The AWU became one of the main left-wing organisations that participated in the Revolution of Dignity, although it was largely isolated from the other groups present, as the populists attempted to gain hegemony over the left-wing opposition. An AWU spokersperson in Kyiv said that the initial self-organisation of the Maidan later gave way to leadership by right-wing political organisations, with rank-and-file activists having little role in the decision-making process.

AWU branches in Lviv and Kharkiv also participated in the protests, becoming one of the more recognised presences in the local opposition movements, but failed to infuse the protests with left-wing aims. As the far-right was relatively weak and divided in Kharkiv, the AWU's local branch was able to freely engage in student activism and community organising, and promote their anti-authoritarian views to liberal protestors. The AWU successfully gained representation in the local coordination council, making Kharkiv the only city with left-wing representation in the Maidan's structures. According to Volodymyr Ishchenko, their relative success was in part due to the Kharkiv AWU having avoided explicitly affiliating themselves with left-wing politics, and instead referring to themselves as anarchists and activists. The Kharkiv AWU remained active in the city after the overthrow of Yanukovych.

== After the revolution ==
After the victory of the revolution and the outbreak of the War in Donbas, the AWU denounced the Donetsk and Luhansk People's Republics as "fascist juntas". A member of the Kharkiv AWU depicted the republics as a cover for the Russian invasion of Ukraine. The AWU issued a statement, declaring themselves against both the Donbas people's republics and the new Ukrainian government, which they claimed to be equally opposed to the unity and federalisation of Ukraine, and denounced "war incitement under the guise of pacifism". They declared their support for organisations provided humanitarian aid to internally displaced person, and called for the strengthening of Ukrainian labour movement and the defence of labour rights throughout Ukraine, which they considered a necessary precursor to end the war.

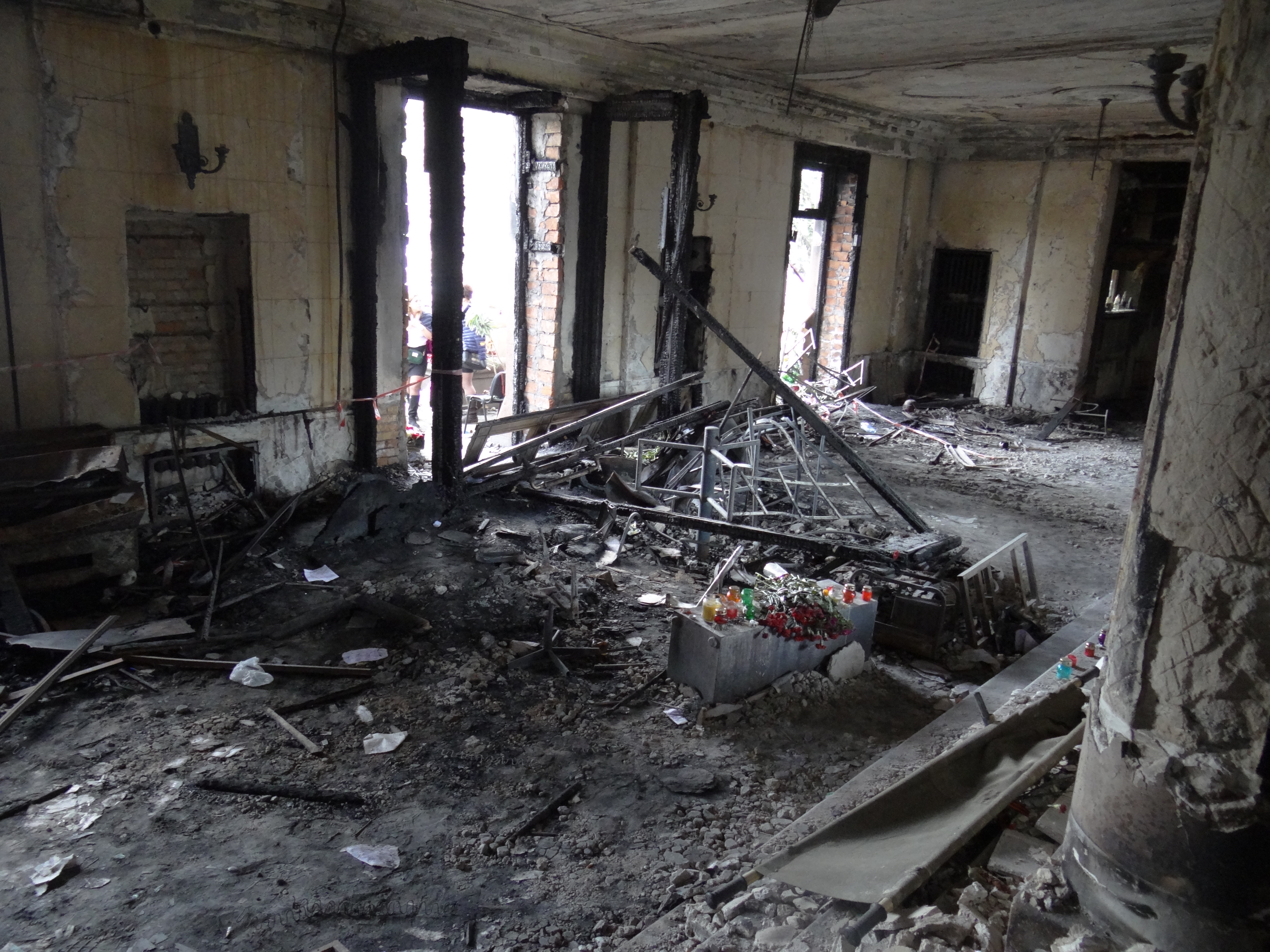
Interior of the Odesa Trade Unions House, following the arson attack against it

The AWU was also fiercely critical of the anti-Maidan movement, which Oleksandr Volodarsky mocked as insufficiently radical or anti-capitalist, and depicted as fundamentally reactionary and Eurasianist. The Kharkiv AWU was the only group of the pro-Maidan left that was organised enough to challenge the anti-Maidan mobilisation, which made it a target for violence by anti-Maidan protestors. AWU members described anti-Maidan activists as "colorados" and "vatniks" (both pejorative terms for people with pro-Russian sentiments), with one justifying the arson attack against the Odesa Trade Unions House as a necessary means to prevent civil war.

In the wake of the 2014 Odesa clashes, the AWU broke with the anti-Maidan leftist organisation Borotba; according to American anthropologist Emily Channell-Justice, the two organisations had previously been on good terms. They criticised Borotba's "Minsk Statement", which they denounced as "implicitly pro-Putin". Under pseudonyms, the AWU publicly attacked Borotba, accusing Borotba activist Oleksii Albu of being personally responsible for the deaths in Odesa. They translated their articles into other languages, attempting to cut international support to Borotba. They called for the international left to distance itself from Borotba, and warned that any support given to the organisation would "fund the civil war". Borotba later claimed that the AWU's articles were used by the Security Service of Ukraine as evidence against them, but provided no evidence of this.

In 2016, the AWU published its analysis of the revolution in "Program of the Revolution's First Day" and in AWU activist Volodymyr Zadyraka's writings for Nihilist, an anti-authoritarian leftist publication with a pro-Ukrainian slant. They presented the Euromaidan as a bourgeois revolution against oligarchy and bureaucracy, and depicted the Russian intervention as a counterrevolution and the Donbas republics as totalitarian, clericalist and fascist. Zadyraka declared that the task of revolutionaries was to continue dismantling the Ukrainian state's capacity for capital accumulation, to establish a decentralised system of self-government and social ownership of the economy. Recalling the debate over anarchist participation on the side of the Allies during World War II, Zadyraka said he would neither denounce anarchists who joined the Ukrainian Armed Forces nor those who conscientiously objected. He also denounced those who supported the Donbas republics and depicted narratives of Western imperialism as a pro-Russian conspiracy theory, designed to unite the far-right and the authoritarian left around claims of "anti-imperialism".

== Dissolution ==
In the wake of the Euromaidan, the AWU lost many of its members due to disillusionment in the leadership of the organisation, which was perceived to be supportive of nationalism and militarism. Some former members established the splinter group "Black Rainbow", which criticised AWU activists for xenophobia, citing declarations of the "collective responsibility" of the Russian people for the invasion. Black Rainbow criticised the Ukrainian government for using the war as a pretext to roll back social progress. Conversely, former AWU member Oleksandr Volodarsky distanced himself from left-wing politics, out of frustration at what he perceived as insufficient anti-Russian sentiment in the western left. By 2020, the AWU was no long an active organisation.

== See also ==
- Revolutionary Confederation of Anarcho-Syndicalists – Ukrainian anarchist organisation
- Workers' Initiative – Polish trade union confederation

== Bibliography ==
- Björk, Tord (2014). "Autonomous Workers' Union". OpenFSM. Archived from the original on 24 March 2019.
- Channell-Justice, Emily S. (2021). "Thinking through positionality in post-socialist politics: Researching contemporary social movements in Ukraine". In Kurtović, Larisa; Sargsyan, Nelli (eds.). After Utopia: Leftist Imaginaries and Activist Politics in the Postsocialist World. Routledge. pp. 47–66. doi:10.4324/9781003149958-3. ISBN 9781003149958.
- Dmytryk, Olenka (2016). ""I'm a Feminist, Therefore…:" The Art of Gender and Sexual Dissent in 2010s Ukraine and Russia". Journal of Soviet and Post-Soviet Politics and Society. doi:10.24216/JSPPS-2016-1-9783838268866_007 (inactive 26 September 2025).
- Ishchenko, Volodymyr (2016a). The Ukrainian Left during and after the Maidan Protests (Report). European United Left/Nordic Green Left. doi:10.13140/RG.2.2.23614.69447.
- Ishchenko, Volodymyr (2016b). "Old and New Left in the Ukrainian Protests before Maidan". Вісник НТУУ "КПІ" Політологія. Соціологія. Право (31/32): 8–13. doi:10.20535/2308-5053.2016.3/4(31/32).137574 (inactive 26 September 2025).
- Ishchenko, Volodymyr (2020). "Left divergence, right convergence: anarchists, Marxists, and nationalist polarization in the Ukrainian conflict, 2013–2014". Globalizations. 17 (5): 820–839. Bibcode:2020Glob...17..820I. doi:10.1080/14747731.2020.1722495.
- Kim, Seongcheol (2020). "Radical democracy and left populism after the squares: 'Social Movement' (Ukraine), Podemos (Spain), and the question of organization". Contemporary Political Theory. 19 (2): 211–232. doi:10.1057/s41296-019-00343-x. ISSN 1470-8914.
- Iltis, Tony (2014a). "Ukraine: Regime fall followed by fresh chaos". Green Left (999): 19. ISSN 1036-126X.
- Iltis, Tony (2014b). "Behind the Ukraine crisis: the West's role in war threat". Green Left (1000): 28, 34. ISSN 1036-126X.
