= Valeriy Soldatenko =

Valery Fedorovych Soldatenko
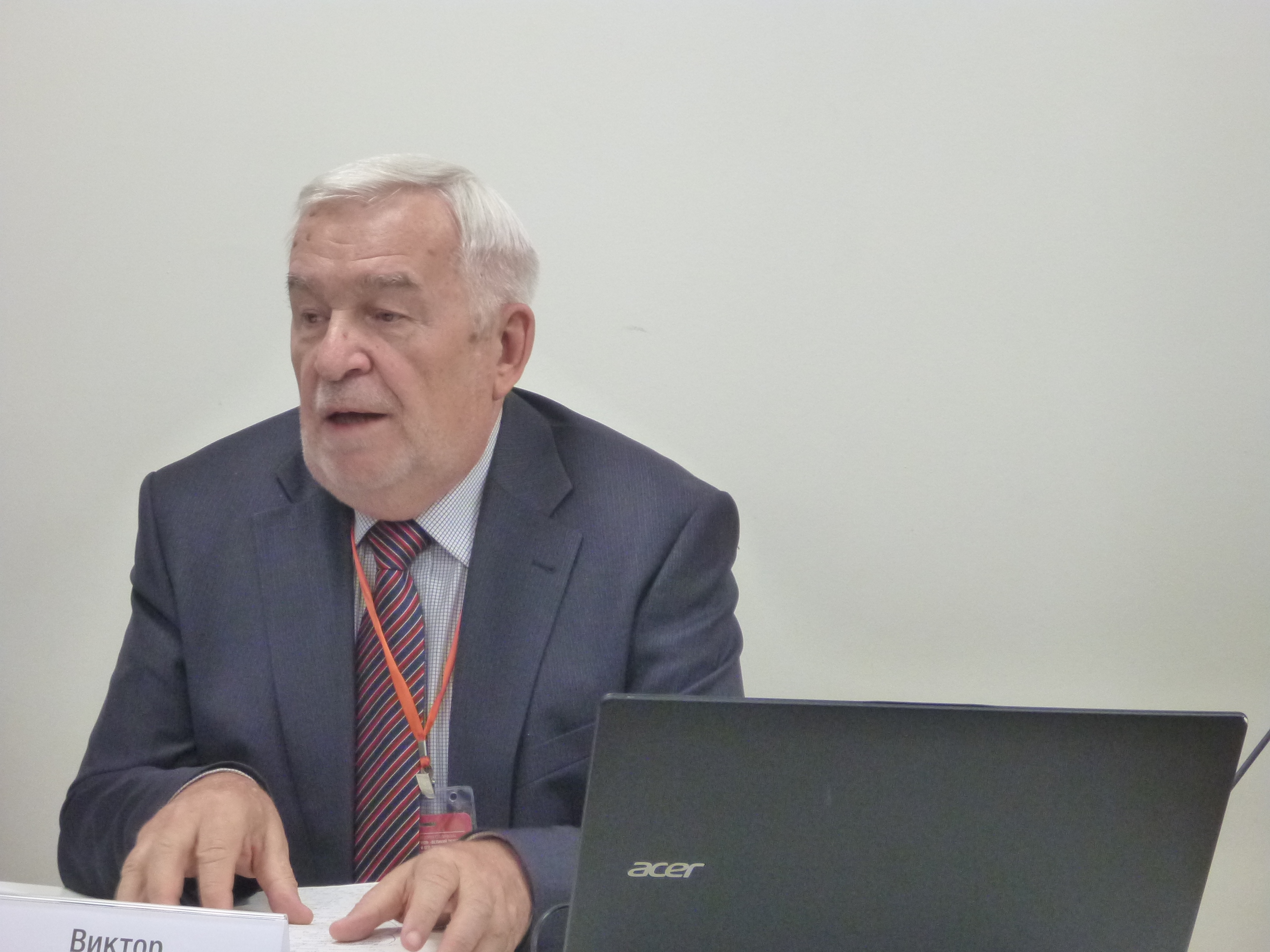
- Soldatenko in 2019

Head of the Ukrainian Institute of National Remembrance
- In office 19 July 2010 – 24 March 2014
- Preceded by: Ihor Yukhnovskyi
- Succeeded by: Volodymyr Viatrovych

Personal details
- Born: April 13, 1946 (age 80) Selydove, Donetsk Oblast, Ukraine
- Education: Taras Shevchenko National University of Kyiv
- Occupation: Historian

Valeriy Soldatenko (Ukrainian: Вале́рій Солдате́нко; born 4 April 1946) is a Ukrainian historian and professor, member of the National Academy of Sciences of Ukraine since 2006. Soldatenko was a member of Communist Party of Ukraine, which he joined in 1969. In 2014, Soldatenko was appointed by then Ukrainian President Viktor Yanukovych as the head of the Ukrainian Institute of National Memory, a decision which proved controversial due to Soldatenko's support for the Soviet Union and denial of the Holodomor as a genocide. After the Ukrainian Revolution, Soldatenko was forced to resign from his post, and since then, he has been a chief researcher at the I. F. Kuras Institute of Political and Ethnonational Studies of the National Academy of Sciences of Ukraine.

== Biography ==
Valeriy Soldatenko was born on April 13, 1946, in Selydivka (now Selydove in Donetsk Oblast). In 1970, he graduated from the Faculty of History of the Taras Shevchenko National University of Kyiv. Until 1976, he worked as an assistant, senior teacher and associate professor at the same university. At the same time, he studied at a graduate school and in 1973 defended his candidate's thesis. His scientific supervisor was Ivan Kuras.

From 1976 to 1984, Soldatenko worked as a senior researcher at the Institute of Party History at the Central Committee of the Communist Party of Ukraine — a branch of the Institute of Marxism–Leninism at the Central Committee of the Communist Party of the Soviet Union (CPSU). Soldatenko researched the history of Bolshevik organizations in Ukraine at the beginning of the 20th century and in 1917–1918; the history of the Party-Soviet press of this period, publishing several individual monographs and becoming a co-author of a number of collective works. In 1981, he defended his doctoral dissertation based on the materials of these studies.

In 1984–1988, he headed the Department of Historical Experience of the CPSU of the Kyiv Higher Party School. From 1988 to 1991, he was the head of the historical and political research department of the Institute of Political Research of the Central Committee of the Communist Party of Ukraine. In 1992–2010, he was the head of the department of ethno-historical studies of the I. F. Kuras Institute of Political and Ethnonational Studies of the National Academy of Sciences of Ukraine. In 2010, Viktor Yanukovych appointed Soldatenko as the head of the Ukrainian Institute of National Memory, at a time where it went from being a governmental institution with a special status from 2006 to 2010 to a research budget institution under the Cabinet of Ministers of Ukraine. This appointment was controversial because Soldatenko, as a member of the Communist Party of Ukraine, was technically tasked with documenting the crimes of the Soviet Union in Ukraine, highlighting a conflict of interest. He was a supporter of the non-genocidal theory of the Holodomor of 1932–33. He strongly opposed the granting of the Hero of Ukraine to Stepan Bandera. Prior to his appointment, he had been involved in drafting the new programme for the Ukrainian Communist Party. In 2014, following the Revolution of Dignity, Valery Soldatenko was forced to leave the post of director of the Ukrainian Institute of National Memory, and Volodymyr Viatrovych became his successor.

Following this, since 2014, Soldatenko returned to the I. F. Kuras Institute of Political and Ethnonational Studies of the National Academy of Sciences of Ukraine, where he currently works as a chief researcher for the institute. In 2015, he became co-chairman of the Left Opposition coalition, however this group was suspended in 2022, following the Russian invasion of Ukraine.

He is the author of more than 650 publications. Among them are about 50 monographs, 20 of which belong exclusively to him.

== Awards ==
- Merited Science and Technology Functionary of Ukraine (May 20, 2011) — for a significant personal contribution to the development of national science, strengthening of the scientific and technical potential of Ukraine through many years of fruitful work
- Pushkin Medal (Russian Federation, March 6, 2012) — for great contributions to the development of cultural ties with the Russian Federation, preservation and popularization of the Russian language and culture abroad
- Medal "To the 140th anniversary of I. V. Stalin"
