= Direct Action (trade union) =

Ukrainian student union

- Independent Student Union "Direct Action"
- Незалежна студентська профспілка «Пряма дія»
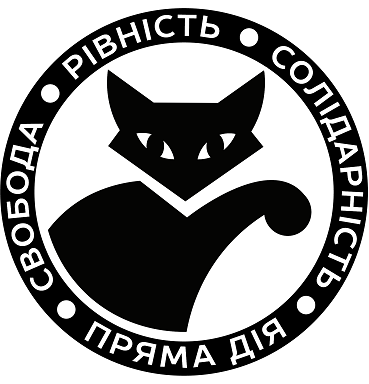
- Founded: 1994 (original); 2008 (renewed)

Direct Action (Ukrainian: Пряма дія, romanized: Pryama diya) is an independent trade union in Ukraine that pulls together students of leftist views. The union was founded in 2008 by the students of Kyiv University. Legalized on 15 April 2009, the union has its branches in a number of Kyiv universities and also in several regional centres of Ukraine.

== Activities ==
=== Re-establishment of the trade union ===
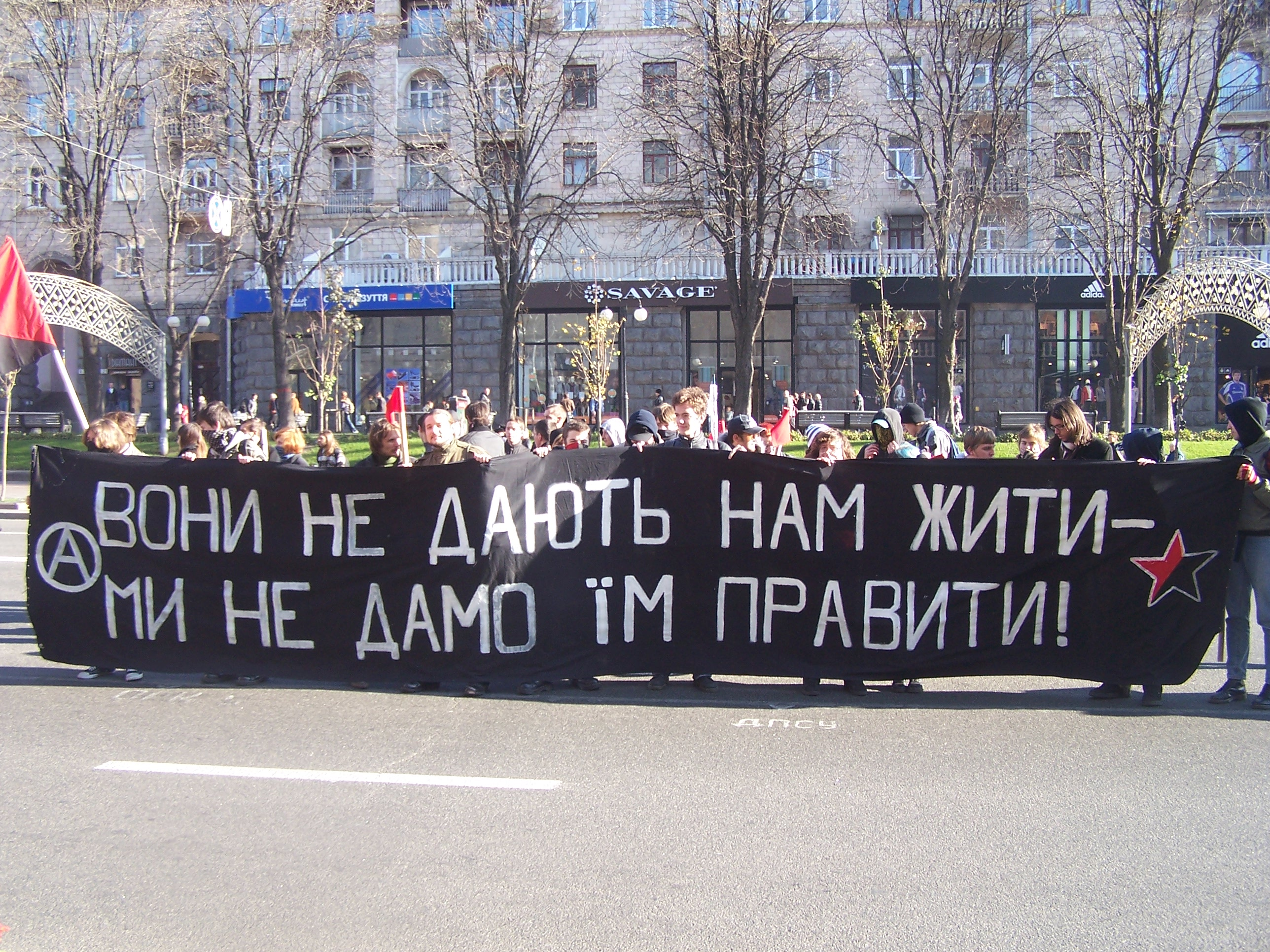
"Direct Action" at the Social March on 8 November 2008

A student union under the name of "Direct Action" already existed in Kyiv in the middle of the 1990s. During the time of its existence, the union succeeded in a number of actions, aimed at the protection of students' rights. These were the first attempts to raise the students' movement in Ukraine. The trade union existed until 1998.

Since its re-establishment in 2008, the Direct Action trade union has been a participant and initiator of a number of campaigns to protect the rights of students and workers. In July, together with other organizations, it held its first action - a picket of the Ministry of Education in support of Rivne students who had achieved negotiations with the university administration on reducing tuition fees. In September, the union opposed the anti-student provisions of the new version of the Law "On Higher Education", in particular forced labor, which led to the removal of controversial articles. In the same autumn, "Direct Action" became one of the initiators of the campaign against the new Labor Code, which limited the rights of employees, organizing public actions, pickets and a large-scale concert "Rock against the Legalization of Slavery" on Khreshchatyk together with allies, after which consideration of the bill was postponed. On 8 November, activists took part in the "Social March".

In June 2009, Direct Action, together with other organizations, led more than 150 students to a picket outside the walls of the Cabinet of Ministers, during which they demonstratively burned a firecracker and several grade books; as a result, at an emergency meeting, the government canceled the resolution on the introduction of paid services. In October, the trade union joined the strike of students and teachers of the Institute. Boychuk, which was accompanied by protests near the Ministry of Education and ended at the end of the month with a loud blockade of the institute. On 17 November, International Students' Day, activists held a "Break the Wall" action against the repressive education system and in solidarity with the German and Austrian striking students.

=== Mass student protests and international campaigns of "Direct Action" (2010–2012) ===
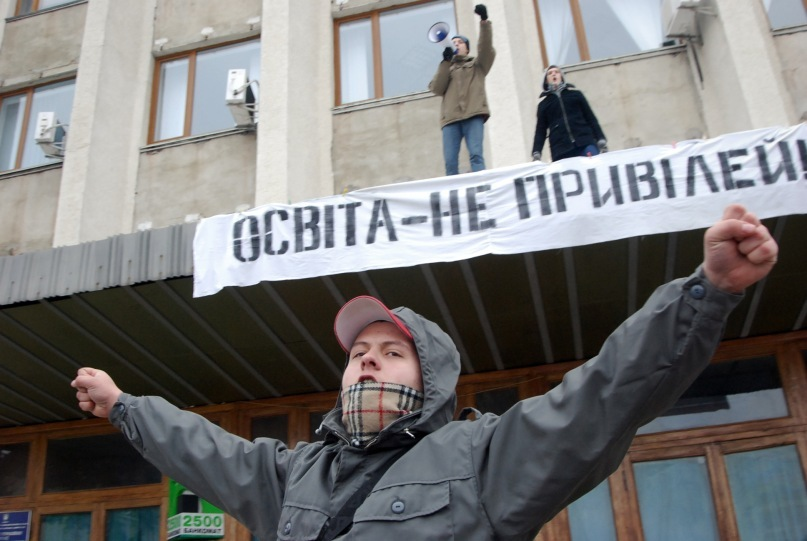
Protest against the commercialization of education in Khmelnytskyi. Direct Action activists on the roof of the Department of Education and Science of Khmelnytskyi Oblast.

In 2010, Direct Action held a number of high-profile actions and campaigns, starting with the March attack by neo-Nazis after a solidarity action with the workers of Nestlé, which even caused condemnation from some ultra-right groups. In April, the trade union initiated an international campaign against repression and interference by special services in universities, held a picket outside the SBU and achieved a temporary cessation of pressure on activists. Then there was the May Day "Collective Action March", participation in the "No to the Police State" campaign after the death of student Igor Indyl, the fight against overcrowding in dormitories and the conflict with the KNU administration. In the fall, Direct Action became the driving force behind protests against Resolution No. 796 on the introduction of paid services in universities, organizing an All-Ukrainian action in 14 cities on 12 October, together with the FRI, which gathered up to 20,000 participants and received international resonance, despite the partial cancellation of the document by the authorities.

In the fall of 2010, Direct Action took an active part in student protests: after the failure of a meeting with the rector of Kyiv National University, which ended with an agreement on negotiations, the trade union supported Simferopol students in a march against Resolution No. 796., and on 12 October, together with the FRI, it organized a large-scale all-Ukrainian action in 14 cities, which gathered up to 20,000 participants and had an international resonance, despite only a partial repeal of the resolution. Later, Direct Action supported the Polish left in their demands for the legalization of labor migrants and ended the year with the Student Offensive in Kyiv and other cities of Ukraine. In the fall of 2010, Direct Action took an active part in student protests: after the failure of a meeting with the rector of Kyiv National University, which ended with an agreement on negotiations, the trade union supported Simferopol students in a march against Resolution No. 796., and on 12 October, together with the FRI, it organized a large-scale all-Ukrainian action in 14 cities, which gathered up to 20,000 participants and had an international resonance, despite only a partial repeal of the resolution. Poet and writer Serhiy Zhadan. Later, Direct Action supported the Polish left in their demands for the legalization of labor migrants and ended the year with the Student Offensive in Kyiv and other cities of Ukraine.

On 17 November 2010, a local branch of "Direct Action" appeared in Khmelnytskyi, and on 11 December, the trade union, together with a number of left-wing and human rights organizations, held a march in Kyiv to mark International Human Rights Day, which ended with a theatrical action on Maidan and an attack by nationalists on march participants. In early 2011, Direct Action, together with allied organizations, launched an all-Ukrainian campaign "Against the Degradation of Education", directed against the commercialization of higher education and the reduction of state procurement, holding three waves of protests in many cities and achieving the cancellation of two bills. In parallel, the trade union organized solidarity actions in Ukraine and abroad, demonstrations against police brutality, rising dormitory prices, and neoliberal reforms, and participated in the international campaign "Spring of resistance" and in the May Day "March of Collective Action".

In 2012, Direct Action combined educational and protest initiatives: in April, the self-organized project "Free School" was launched on the principles of free, accessible and equal education, and a campaign was launched to protect female students of the Shakhtar Pedagogical College from forced labor and humiliation, which ended with partial concessions from the administration and a fine for the director. The trade union joined the May Day action "Attack for Workers' Rights", held the second international summer camp in Crimea together with "Student Action", established cooperation with other independent trade unions and received its own premises in the city center, which after renovation became a place for meetings, lectures, a library and preparation of actions until 2013.

=== Latest activities ===
"Direct Action" during the anti-corruption protests in Ukraine 2025
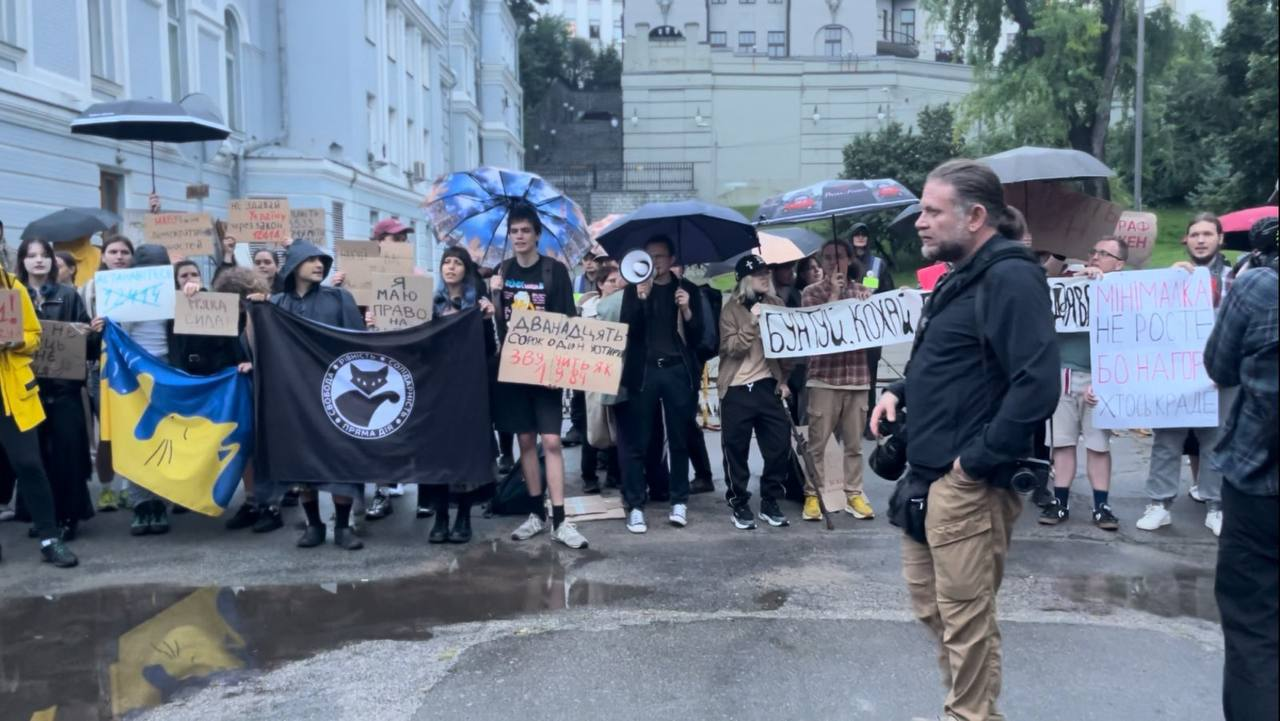
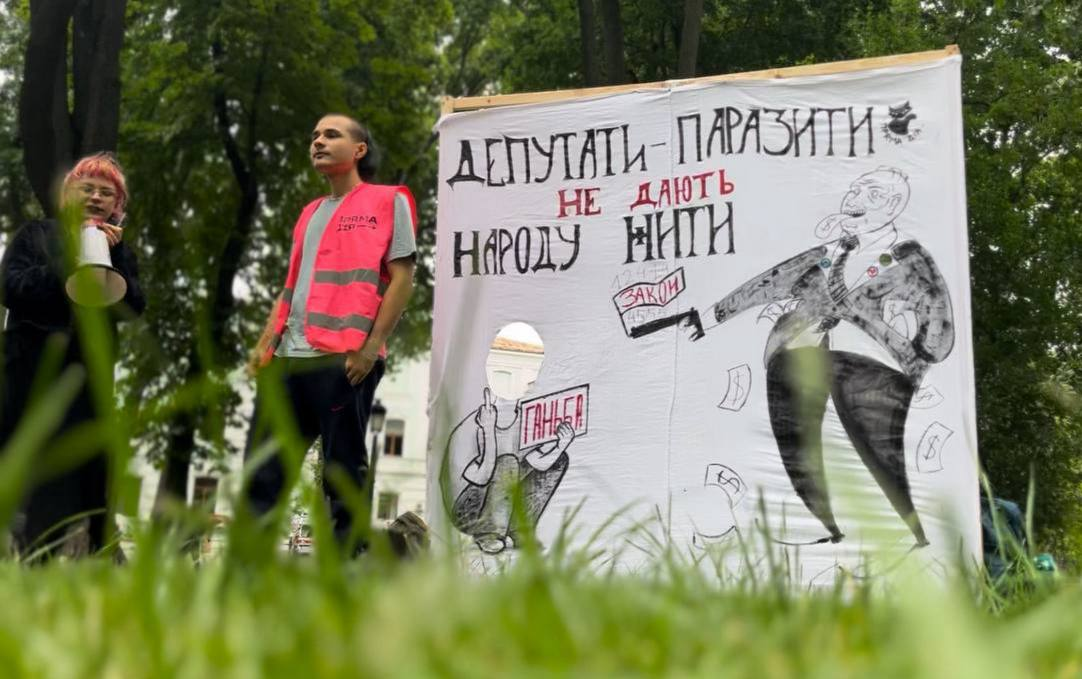

The trade union helped students of the Ukrainian Academy of Printing organize a protest against the merger with the Lviv National University. Later, "Direct Action" conducted an educational campaign "#AntifascismWeek", publishing posts about students who fought against fascist invaders in the 20th century. Thanks to the efforts of the trade union, a student of the T. Shevchenko, the initiative "Students – Academic!" was also held, designed to draw attention to the problem of state-funded students taking academic leave during martial law. On the initiative of "Direct Action", a series of meetings were organized to clean up Kyiv parks. The trade union achieved the creation of the "Student Committee of October 11", designed to audit the installation of windows and doors at the Lviv National University, and then organized an inspection of shelters in universities as part of the "BUS" initiative. "Direct Action" activists participated in protests by students of KNUKiT, KIMU, etc. In November 2023, Direct Action participated in a student rally in front of Lviv Polytechnic demanding the resignation of Iryna Farion, organized by the public organization "Ukrainian Students for Freedom". That same month, Direct Action organized a protest at the private Kyiv International University against the administration's decision to charge students for missing classes.

As part of the "Against the Merger of Knowledge" campaign, aimed at opposing the intentions of the MES to unite and reorganize higher education institutions, the trade union created a solidarity network, which united students from a number of universities that were subject to reorganization. On 25 January 2024, an action was held at the Tavrida National University at a meeting with Mykhailo Vinnytsky and Serhiy Kvit against the accession of TNU to the Kyiv-Mohyla Academy. This campaign was also supported by international student organizations from Poland and Britain. On 21 March, a similar action took place in Lviv against the merger of the Ukrainian Academy of Printing with the Lviv Polytechnic.

In 2024, "Direct Action" organized a number of collective appeals, protests, and pickets at various universities in Ukraine, which forced the administrations of dormitories and academic buildings to begin repairs, improve sanitary conditions and heating, and respond to other urgent needs of students. At the end of the year, activists from "Direct Action" helped students of the NAOMA file a collective complaint demanding improved sanitary conditions in the dormitory and heating in the workshops, and after the administration's delay, on 10 March 2025, students, with the support of the trade union, held a picket near the academy. In the summer of 2025, Direct Action joined the large-scale anti-corruption protests.

On 24 July 2026 Lviv Direct Action activist Makysym Shumakov was notified that a criminal case had been opened against him for dissemination of Communist symbols, an activity illegal under Article 436-1 of the Criminal Code of Ukraine. Shumakov claimed that the charges stemmed from English language articles he shared on Facebook and that they were likely retaliation for his activism.

== See also ==
- Direct action
- Visual Culture Research Center
