= Maxim Kurochkin =

Russian politician (1969–2007)

- Born: Maxim Borisovich Kurochkin; 4 June 1969; Moscow, Soviet Union
- Died: 27 March 2007 (aged 37); Kyiv, Ukraine
- Cause of death: Assassination by gunshot
- Citizenship: Russia
- Education: Moscow State University
- Occupations: crime boss, businessman, political figure
- Children: son Maxim, daughter Alisa
- Parents: Boris Ivanovich Kurochkin, diplomat, boxer, businessman (father); Galina Arkadyevna Kurochkina, restaurateur (mother)

Maxim Borisovich Kurochkin, nicknamed Mad Max, (4 June 1969, Moscow, Soviet Union – 27 March 2007, Kyiv, Ukraine) was a Russian and Ukrainian businessman, political figure, and crime boss.

In the early 1990s, he was the leader of the group that privatized Moscow's largest market, "Luzhniki"; from the late 1990s until 2006, he had a large business in Ukraine (he owned five regional power companies, several hotels, and one large market); in 2004, he became involved in Ukrainian politics (as a sponsor) at the highest level—founder of the "Russian Club" in Kyiv in 2004. He was mentioned in connection with the case of the poisoning of Yushchenko in 2004. In the 2006 parliamentary elections in Ukraine, he sponsored the party "Russian–Ukrainian Union" (part of the Vitrenko Bloc). In Ukraine, he was considered the organizer of the storming of the "Ozerka" market in Dnipropetrovsk on October 30, 2006 (in Ukrainian media, his nickname "Max the Mad" was widely mentioned). At the end of 2006, he lost political significance due to his arrest. He was shot dead on the premises of the Sviatoshynskyi District Court in Kyiv.

== Biographical data ==
Maxim Borisovich Kurochkin was born in Moscow, the eldest son (he has a brother Denis) in a family of diplomats. He served his conscript service in the Soviet Army. In 1989, he entered the law faculty of Moscow State University, graduating in 1994; his classmate was Tatyana Montyan. A former judo athlete.

He was married (divorced in 2004 after 15 years of marriage). Son Maxim, daughter Alisa.

His father, Boris Ivanovich Kurochkin, was a diplomat. In addition to diplomatic service, he wrote poetry and even songs.

Maxim Kurochkin was personally acquainted with a number of politicians and political analysts:

- In Russia — with businessman and politician Alexander Babakov (Rodina party), with whom Kurochkin long shared a business (starting in the 1990s at the Luzhniki market and continuing until 2004).
- In Ukraine — his "high‑level acquaintances" mainly date back to 2004 and are connected with the activities of the "Russian Club", in which Viktor Medvedchuk (head of the Presidential Administration of Kuchma in 2004), Vice Prime Minister Andriy Klyuyev, and Prime Minister Viktor Yanukovych actively participated. The Russian Club was dominated by well‑known Russian political analysts Gleb Pavlovsky and Marat Gelman. The peak of Kurochkin's "political activity" occurred during the 2004 Ukrainian presidential election.

In the 2006 Ukrainian parliamentary elections, Kurochkin financed the party "Russian–Ukrainian Union" as part of the "Vitrenko bloc" (the Vitrenko bloc received 2.93%, falling just hundredths of a percent short of the 3% threshold).

=== Business in Russia (1990s) ===
Kurochkin made his first million at the age of 25 by doing business at Moscow's Luzhniki market. In the mid‑1990s he became involved with Alexander Babakov and privatized Moscow's largest market, Luzhniki (hence the name of the business group — the "Luzhniki group"). The press pointed to his ties to the criminal underworld, specifically the "Luzhniki" criminal group. Kurochkin is said to have been involved in robberies, extortion and other criminal activities. He was also a suspect in the contract killing of criminal boss Sergei Batozsky ("Baton", "Seryozha Kharkivsky") in July 2001. Several criminal cases were opened against Kurochkin, but all of them quickly came to nothing.

The press reported that the reason for Kurochkin's "untouchability" lay in his cooperation with Interior Minister Vladimir Rushailo. Allegedly, Rushailo sought to use Kurochkin's group to push Chechen and other organized criminal groups out of Moscow's markets.

=== Business in Ukraine (since the late 1990s) ===
Kurochkin's business in Ukraine began in 1999, during a period of large‑scale privatization. He moved his family to Kyiv, while he himself commuted between Moscow and Kyiv on a private plane. He worked with his partner Alexander Babakov (a State Duma deputy and, from March 2006, chairman of the Rodina party).

Kurochkin and Babakov's company, VS Energy International, became known as the "Slovak group" because of its place of registration. Unofficially, many called it the "Luzhniki group," continuing to associate it with Kurochkin's initial business. Soon the group's sphere of influence included:

- A number of regional electricity distribution monopolies: Khersonoblenergo, Zhytomyroblenergo, Kirovohradoblenergo, Odesaoblenergo, and Sevastopoloblenergo. According to Kurochkin himself, in 2004 he owned "five oblenergos, three hotels, seven city gas companies and had a monthly income of half a million dollars."
- Hotels: the Premier Palace and Dnipro in Kyiv; the Oreanda in Yalta; the Dniester in Lviv; the Star in Mukachevo; the Londonskaya in Odesa. The same group owned a number of enterprises in Kharkiv under the common "Argo" brand. In Kharkiv these included confectionery and pelmeni production, pasta manufacturing, Argo‑branded supermarkets, a liquor and vodka distillery, and an Argo mineral water bottling plant.
- The Dnipropetrovsk market "Ozyorka," over which the "Kurochkin group" long clashed with Hennadiy Korban's "Slavutych‑Capital" group, close to Privat (later Yuriy Lutsenko described the situation as "Kurochkin attacks – the Privat group defends itself").

After his death, half of his estate went to his wife and half to his sister, Ekaterina Fesenko.

== In Ukrainian politics ==
=== 2004 presidential election ===
On the eve of the 2004 Ukrainian presidential election, Kurochkin found himself in the thick of Ukrainian politics, creating the "Russian Club" in Kyiv. It was headed by the leading Russian political strategist in Ukraine at that time, Gleb Pavlovsky.

The organization was opened on 31 August 2004 with the participation of Ukrainian Prime Minister Viktor Yanukovych, the heads of the presidential administrations of Ukraine and Russia, Medvedchuk and Dmitry Medvedev, as well as regional leaders from both countries, members of governments, deputies, and public figures. At the club's opening, Prime Minister Yanukovych said: "Today we have come to a practical solution — the decision to create the Russian Club, which will take on a whole range of functions in relations between our states, primarily humanitarian and also economic."

The "Russian Club" immediately became the headquarters of Russian political strategists in Ukraine, a venue for crowded press conferences (which were actively covered by pro-government Ukrainian media). Commentators noted that the club worked actively for Yanukovych's victory in the 2004 presidential election.

=== 2006 parliamentary election ===
During the 2006 election campaign, reports appeared in the press that Kurochkin financed the election campaign of Nataliya Vitrenko — her bloc failed to enter the Verkhovna Rada, falling short of the electoral threshold by one-tenth of a percent. The "Vitrenko Bloc" in the 2006 election campaign stood out for its large number of campaign tents and advertising, on a scale comparable to Ukraine's largest parties. Vitrenko herself stated that Kurochkin had contacts not directly with her party (the Progressive Socialist Party of Ukraine), but with the second party of her bloc, the "Russian-Ukrainian Union".

== Criminal cases against Kurochkin in 2005–2007 ==
After Yushchenko's victory, in 2005 the Ministry of Internal Affairs of Ukraine opened a criminal case against Kurochkin, and Ukrainian Interpol put him on the wanted list. Kurochkin was accused of illegally obtaining 340 hectares of the Yalta Nature Reserve, the "Ozerka" market in Dnipropetrovsk, and the "Dnipro" hotel in Kyiv.

Kurochkin fled to Russia and reappeared in Ukraine only on 20 November 2006. Straight from the airport, Kurochkin was taken to a pre-trial detention center on charges of extorting $10,000. He was suspected of involvement in two crimes under Part 2 of Article 189 (extortion) of the Criminal Code of Ukraine.

Over the following four months behind bars, Kurochkin pretended to be mentally unstable. Through the media, he appealed to God: "Please come to my trial!", declared himself the Messiah. In a letter to Rinat Akhmetov (handed over from the courtroom on 18 March 2007 through correspondent Sonia Koshkina), Kurochkin demanded that he "sort out" those who killed his people: "Rinat! The day before yesterday my people were killed. I came to visit you; unfortunately, you and I never met. Sort this out, please! I will give you what you really want. Rinat, I know what you truly want – a long, long life in a healthy body. Yours. Deal with them like a true Muslim – as written in the Koran". Also at the trial, Kurochkin promised to "eat the vile Lutsenko."

Kurochkin's arrival in Ukraine on 20 November 2006 was explained by commentators as an attempt to protect his business. He hoped for support from the Yanukovych team, for whose victory Kurochkin had worked during the 2004 election as part of the Russian Club. However, Kurochkin was arrested by the "orange" interior minister Lutsenko (Lutsenko was serving his last ten days in office; the Second Yanukovych government had already been working for three months, initially including "nine ministers from President Yushchenko"). Even after Lutsenko resigned as Ukraine's interior minister (dismissed on 1 December 2006) and a Yanukovych nominee was appointed to the post, Kurochkin was not released from custody.

On 1 December 2006, the Russian Club (still headed by Kurochkin in Ukraine) appealed to the Ukrainian authorities to release Kurochkin. However, Kurochkin was kept in the detention center, probably because on the eve of his arrival (30 October 2006) his people had taken part in a scandalous seizure of the "Ozerka" market. It is also believed that influential politicians, friends of Kurochkin in Russia and Ukraine, for some reason abandoned him in 2006.

== Attempted seizure of the "Ozerka" market in Dnipropetrovsk ==
On October 30, 2006, footage was broadcast on all Ukrainian television channels showing how 150 people armed with stun grenades and traumatic pistols attempted to break into the "Ozerka" market early in the morning in order to seize the management building. However, a unit of the "Berkut" special police force that arrived at the scene disarmed the attackers and forced them to lie down in long rows on the asphalt. Ninety people were detained, and two "Berkut" officers were injured. A significant part of this nighttime and morning attack was filmed and shown on Ukrainian television. The attackers were mostly hired professional security guards dressed in camouflage. The market's management accused Maxim Kurochkin of the attempted seizure.

== Murder of Kurochkin's people ==
Shortly after Kurochkin's arrest, the most important members of his group were killed:

On December 16, 2006, at 1:00 a.m., the first deputy director of the central "Ozerka" market, Vladimir Aleksandrovich Vorobyov (a Russian citizen born in 1967), was shot dead on the steps as he was leaving the "Salut" cinema entertainment complex in Dnipropetrovsk. His 24-year-old female companion received a gunshot wound to her right leg and was hospitalized. The killer fired more than 20 shots at close range from a pistol before fleeing.

On March 16, 2007, a jeep was riddled with automatic gunfire by unknown assailants on the busy Obukhiv highway near the village of Pliuty, outside Kyiv. Three people from Kurochkin's entourage were killed: Kurochkin's head of security Alexander Kharchyshen and his acquaintances Demyan Topilin and Anatoly Kurylenko.

== Murder ==
Assassination of Maxim Kurochkin
- Location: 50°26′15.3″N 30°22′58.7″E
- Target: Maxim Kurochkin
- Attack type: Sniper assassination
- Weapon: Sako TRG
- Deaths: 1
- Injuries: 1 convoy guard
- Victims: 2

Kurochkin was killed on 27 March 2007 at around 17:00 in the courtyard of the Sviatoshynskyi District Court in Kyiv by a shot to the heart, after the end of a court hearing in his case. At the hearing immediately before his death he had asked to be released and said that he did not want to die. According to regulations, the prison van was supposed to be parked right next to the door, but the court yard was being renovated and a pile of construction waste lay by the door, so the van was standing three metres from the door. Kurochkin had to walk literally two seconds – from the courthouse door to the van; but the sniper fired at the very instant Kurochkin stepped into the yard from the doorway. The shot was fired quickly and accurately, the sniper firing from the attic of a nine-storey building about 80 metres from the courthouse. Kurochkin was shot from a "Finnish sniper rifle 'Sako TRG-42'", which has great stopping power (the bullet weighs 7.5 grammes); the sniper left the rifle in the attic of the building. Witnesses saw two masked men walk out of the entrance and drive away in a Mazda. The car was later found abandoned in Kyiv.

According to the newspaper Segodnya, Kurochkin's last words were "Vot blyad". The same shot also wounded the police sergeant Andrei Litvinchuk, who was escorting Kurochkin. The convoy officer survived.

The head of the company "Slavutych-Capital", Korban, who had been in conflict with Kurochkin over "Ozerka", stated: "We are shocked by what happened. But we cannot be suspected of having an interest in this death, because our conflict with Kurochkin was exhausted long ago."

== Statements about Kurochkin ==
Natalia Vitrenko said of him after his death: "— I did not know Kurochkin myself – it was not my PSPU party that dealt with him, but the second party of my bloc (the Russian-Ukrainian Union). I heard the nickname 'Max the Mad' from Lutsenko. He was the one who latched onto him for some reason. But the story is a real detective one! Who needed him out of the way so badly? If this is business, then we are talking about billion-dollar deals, not the laughable $10,000 he was accused of."

After Kurochkin's death, the Moscow political analyst Marat Gelman, who had worked for the team of Yanukovych and Medvedchuk during the 2004 Ukrainian presidential election, wrote about him in his blog: "— He was, of course, no gift, but I have rarely met people so powerfully gifted by nature. Sasha Babakov introduced us. They were partners. Two opposites: one cautious, inconspicuous, clever; the other flamboyant, talented, reckless."

== Court proceedings regarding Kurochkin after his death ==
On 24 September 2007, the Sviatoshynskyi District Court of Kyiv found Maxim Kurochkin not guilty of the crime of extortion under Part 2 of Article 189 of the Criminal Code of Ukraine.

However, on 8 October, the Kyiv prosecutor's office filed an appeal against the decision of the Sviatoshynskyi District Court.

== Investigation into Kurochkin's murder, 2007–2010 ==
In May 2007, the Security Service of Ukraine (SBU) and the Ministry of Internal Affairs (MVD) arrested six individuals, including Furman, Pugachev, and Yeremenko, suspected of involvement in the murder of Kurochkin and members of his team — the deputy director of the Ozerka market, Vorobyov, and three people on the Obukhiv highway.

By 8 April 2008, the investigations into the murder of the deputy director of the Ozerka market and the killings on the Obukhiv highway had been completed.

Two years later, on 23 March 2010, the Dnipropetrovsk Regional Court of Appeal delivered a verdict in the case of the murder of the deputy director of the Ozerka central market. The court sentenced three accomplices to various prison terms: the leader of the organized criminal group, who took part in the shooting, received 15 years; two individuals who helped prepare the crime and kept Vladimir Vorobyov under surveillance were sentenced to 11 and 10 years of imprisonment, respectively.

On 26 March 2010, the Investigation Department of the Main Directorate of the Ministry of Internal Affairs of Ukraine in Kyiv announced that the identity of the hitman who killed M. Kurochkin had been established. The killer was put on the wanted list. This man had previously lived in Dnipropetrovsk but had obtained Russian citizenship. At one time, he had worked in a special unit of the security forces. However, the police stated that the chances of finding him were extremely slim, because "such people do not live long."

On 2 December 2010, the Ministry of Internal Affairs (Ukraine) announced that the person who ordered Kurochkin's murder was a Russian citizen and was located outside Ukraine. Russian law enforcement agencies were involved in the search.

== Reaction five years later ==
Ukraine's Ombudsman Nina Karpachova recalled that Kurochkin's murder in the courtroom "shocked, sounding like a shot at Ukraine's image".

Former Deputy Minister of Internal Affairs General Moskal stated that "Mad Max" had "blood up to his elbows", and that he "wasn't friends with his head, hence the nickname". Moskal also asserted that there was a general in Ukraine's Ministry of Internal Affairs who took money to "protect" Kurochkin; and that "Kurochkin was greatly helped by the Ukrainian authorities" in privatization and business.

Politician Natalia Vitrenko explained that Kurochkin financed not her own party, the PSPU, but the Russian-Ukrainian Union party, with which "Vitrenko's PSPU" ran in a bloc during the 2006 parliamentary and local elections.

The newspaper Segodnya (owned by Ukraine's richest man, Rinat Akhmetov, to whom Kurochkin passed a letter in the courtroom) published for the first time the name of the alleged killer, whom a "key witness" named to the police in May 2007 – supposedly Timofey Ratushny (criminal boss Zhora Armani), born in 1976, a native of Dnipropetrovsk, a former special forces soldier and athlete, who obtained Russian citizenship in the 2000s.

Ratushny was charged in absentia (and placed on the wanted list in Ukraine) in May 2007; in April 2008 he was placed on the international wanted list, but the case was soon suspended; it was reopened only in early 2011 – materials on Ratushny were sent to the "National Central Bureau of Interpol in Ukraine". Since October 2011, the case has been handled by the Main Investigation Department of the Ministry of Internal Affairs of Ukraine. The Ukrainian Interior Ministry states that the Kurochkin case has stalled: "If Armani hasn't been eliminated, he's hidden somewhere under a fake passport with a changed appearance".

The identity of the second person in the hit group (there were two people in the attic of the building) remains unknown.

== Multimedia ==
- Diagram of the "shot at Kurochkin" — shows the layout of the buildings and the direction of the shot. Aired on the Ukrainian TV channel "Inter" in March 2007.
- A short account of Kurochkin's story, presented on the programme "Exclamation Mark" (Znahk oklyku) on the Ukrainian TV channel "TBi". May 2010.
- Video fragment about the "attempt to seize Ozerka" on 30 October 2006 by the raiders of M. Kurochkin. A more detailed version was shown on Ukrainian television.
- Vorobyov (deputy director of the Ozerka market) at a press conference in the premises of the Union of Journalists in Dnipropetrovsk: "Kurochkin will soon enter (Ukraine), and will soon be here." 3 November 2006.
- Maksim Kurochkin is detained at Kyiv Boryspil Airport upon arrival in Ukraine. 20 November 2006.
- Kurochkin's last seconds before stepping into the courtyard where he was killed. 28 March 2007.
- The verdict is handed down to the killers of Vorobyov (deputy director of the Ozerka market). 23 March 2010.
- When the judge asked him to state his name, Kurochkin introduced himself as the "messiah". He also "blessed" everyone present and professed his love for his "common‑law wife" Yulia: "And do you love me like that? But I still love you more than anyone else."
- After Kurochkin's murder, an ambulance takes away a wounded policeman.
- Boris Ivanovich Kurochkin, song "Mama". 4 May 2010.
