= 1999 Ukrainian presidential election =

Re-election of Leonid Kuchma

- 31 October 1999 (first round); 14 November 1999 (second round)
- Turnout: 70.15% (first round) ▼0.22pp 74.87% (second round) ▲3.24pp
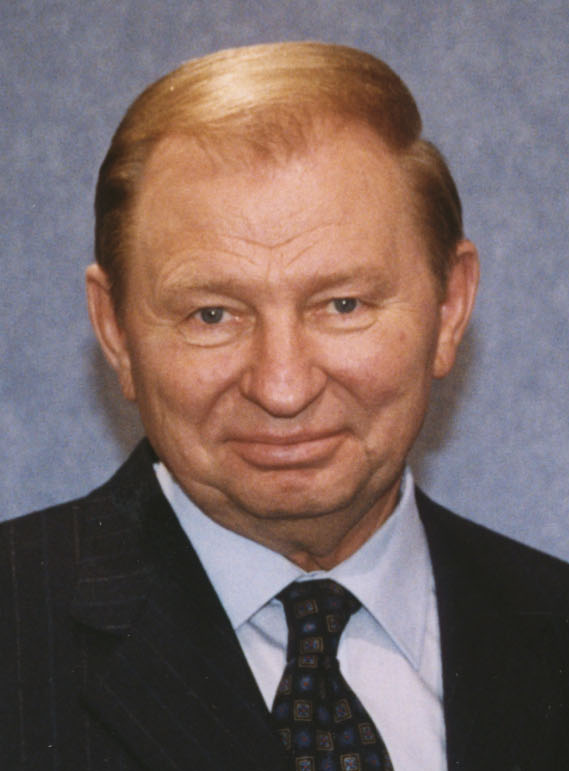

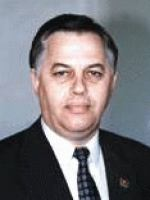
Nominee	Leonid Kuchma	Petro Symonenko
Party	Independent	KPU
Popular vote	15,870,722	10,665,420
Percentage	57.70%	38.77%
President before election
Leonid Kuchma
Independent
Elected President
Leonid Kuchma
Independent

Presidential elections were held in Ukraine on 31 October 1999, with a second round on 14 November. The result was a victory for Leonid Kuchma, who defeated Petro Symonenko in the run-off, winning a second consecutive presidential election.

Kuchma, who had been elected on a leftist programme in 1994 before subsequently abandoning it for economic liberalisation, was extremely unpopular prior to the election, with a reputation for patronage and ties to large corporations and organised crime. Two major opponents of Kuchma were unable to compete in the election: Pavlo Lazarenko of the centrist Hromada was arrested in the United States on money laundering and embezzlement charges, while Viacheslav Chornovil, leader of the centre-right Rukh, died in a traffic collision under disputed circumtances. Kuchma's main opponents were Oleksandr Moroz, leader of the centre-left Socialist Party, and far-left candidates Petro Symonenko and Nataliya Vitrenko; Moroz, Kuchma's most significant opponent, was eliminated in the first round, and Kuchma campaigned against the uncharismatic and unpopular Symonenko as a supporter of Russian imperialism and an opponent of Ukrainian independence.

The first round was marked by the Kaniv Four, a quadrumvirate of Moroz and three other candidates who pledged to drop out in support of the highest-polled candidate. The alliance collapsed shortly before the first round of voting, possibly as a result of government interference. A falsified assassination attempt against Vitrenko was also blamed on Moroz. In the second round, Kuchma accused Symonenko of supporting Soviet and Russian atrocities. Symonenko attempted to moderate his position, expressing support for private business and renouncing the possibility of Ukraine joining the Union State, but his appeals were not widely published outside of communist press. Symonenko was largely supported by social conservatives, Pan-Slavists and leftists, while Kuchma benefited from a significant number of voters seeing him as a lesser evil than communism.

Kuchma utilised extensive administrative resources, including state media, the Security Service and the presidential administration, to harass his political opponents and benefit his re-election. He additionally pressured banks and oligarchs to provide him with financial backing. The Parliamentary Assembly of the Council of Europe referred to the conduct of the election as "a disgrace", noting a media blackout against opposition candidates. Local governments pressured state employees to vote for Kuchma and utilised governmental resources to encourage turnout.

As of 2026, this is the only re-election of an incumbent president in the history of independent Ukraine.

== Background ==
Leonid Kuchma had been elected president of Ukraine in the 1994 election, succeeding Leonid Kravchuk. Kuchma, who came from eastern Ukraine, initially ran on a leftist campaign of opposition to Ukrainian nationalism and bilingualism between the Ukrainian and Russian languages. After being elected, however, Kuchma abandoned his previous leftist rhetoric and supported Kravchuk's policies of nation-building, though he abandoned Kravchuk's emphasis on ethnic and linguistic nationalism for civic nationalist policies and placed increased attention on economic concerns, which Kuchma and his advisers viewed as hindering nation-building.

Prior to the election, Kuchma was extremely unpopular; a March 1999 poll from The Day, a Kyivan newspaper, registered 7% of voters as trusting Kuchma, and a November 1998 poll from The Day indicated that 31% of voters said they would never vote for him, the highest number above all candidates. In the 1998 parliamentary election, the two main pro-Kuchma parties (the People's Democratic Party and the Social Democratic Party of Ukraine (united)) together gathered less than 10% of the vote.

=== Corporate rule and instability ===
Since 1991, Ukraine's political system had been dominated by a political system of cooperation between the centre-right national democrats and "centrist" corporate groups in an informal coalition against the left. The national democrats, who emerged from the Ukraine's Soviet dissidents, recognised its inability to govern Ukraine on its own and accepted the dominance of corporate groups over the state in return for maintaining policies of Ukrainianisation and the granting of important ministries to the national democrats. The "centrist" bloc was dominated by three oligarchic "clans", which dated back to the Soviet era and were based along geographic lines: the Kyiv Clan, the Dnipropetrovsk Clan and the Donetsk Clan. Kuchma belonged to the Dnipropetrovsk Clan.

Historian Andrew Wilson argues that Kuchma's election as president "inaugurated a virtual corporate takeover of the state" from the national-democratic intellectuals and national communists that had guided Kravchuk's presidency. According to Wilson, Kuchma "soon gained notoriety" for his widespread usage of patronage. Additional accusations of ties to organised crime dogged Kuchma, namely that his 1994 campaign had been partially financed by companies Seabeco and Nordex, which were tied to members of the Ukrainian mafia and the Russian Solntsevskaya Bratva and were involved in arms trafficking to Iran and North Korea.

Like Kravchuk before him, Kuchma's presidency had been marked by governmental instability; Vitaliy Masol, an opponent of reform and a Kravchuk appointee, was originally retained as prime minister before being removed after half a year. Yevhen Marchuk, Kuchma's first appointed prime minister, resigned ostensibly due to obtaining a mandate as a People's Deputy of Ukraine (though academic Bohdan Harasymiw says that Kuchma's uneasiness with Marchuk's popularity led to Kuchma forcing his resignation), while his successor, Pavlo Lazarenko, resigned due to "ill health" amidst a large-scale corruption scandal. Lazarenko in turn was replaced by Valeriy Pustovoitenko, a leader of the pro-Kuchma People's Democratic Party who was a member of the Dnipropetrovsk Clan.

==== Lazarenko scandal ====
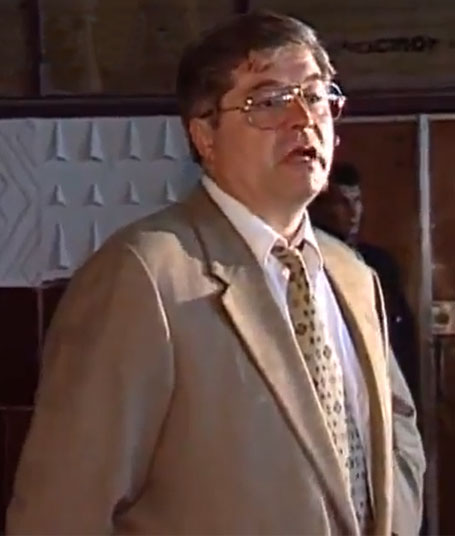
Pavlo Lazarenko, a competitor to Kuchma, fled Ukraine and was arrested on money laundering charges before the 1999 election

Pavlo Lazarenko, governor of Dnipropetrovsk Oblast and a member of Kuchma's Dnipropetrovsk Clan, was appointed as prime minister in late May 1996. Soon after being appointed, it became evident that Lazarenko was involved in massive money laundering. Utilising government resources, Lazarenko transferred as much as 50% of Ukraine's gross domestic product and US$700 million to Dnipropetrovsk Clan businesses linked to him. It is unclear whether Lazarenko acted independently or was assisted by Kuchma in laundering money. Local business leaders (namely natural gas trader Yulia Tymoshenko) were also implicated in Lazarenko's network, which was being used to fund a political movement for Lazarenko. Kuchma was pressured by Western diplomats to remove Lazarenko, and he eventually did so in July 1997.

Concerns about the scale and publicity of Lazarenko's corruption were not the sole reason for his removal; Kuchma was also concerned about Lazarenko's political popularity. After being removed as prime minister, Lazarenko founded the centrist Hromada party in opposition to Kuchma. The party was successful at the 1998 election, winning 40 seats, and Kuchma and his allies began devoting their attention to destroying the party.

The Prosecutor General of Ukraine launched an investigation into Lazarenko in January 1997. He was subpoenaed by the Prosecutor General's office in March 1998, but failed to appear. An attempt to lift his parliamentary immunity at the time did not succeed. In December 1998, Lazarenko was arrested while entering Switzerland and charged with money laundering. His bail was posted and he returned to Ukraine before again fleeing to the United States ahead of a 17 February 1999 vote that successfully lifted his parliamentary immunity. There, he was arrested on a fraudulent Argentine visa and accused of embezzling US$2 million, obtaining 2 million hryvnias in kickbacks and laundering 4.4 million Swiss francs and US$1.1 million through foreign bank accounts. Hromada, which had nominated him for the presidency shortly before his flight from Ukraine, soon collapsed, with his erstwhile ally Tymoshenko forming the breakaway Batkivshchyna party.

That Lazarenko was a significant political opponent of Kuchma prior to his flight from Ukraine has led to controversy about the extent to which prosecution was motivated by political, rather than legal, grievances. Olena Nikolayenko says that "it is generally believed" that Lazarenko's presidential ambitions, as well as a struggle with Kuchma over control of the Dnipropetrovsk clan, were the main causes of his flight from Ukraine. Harasymiw argues that whether the prosecution of Lazarenko politically-motivated is irrelevant as a result of the intertwining of politics, business and organised crime in Ukraine. The alliance between Lazarenko and Socialist Party of Ukraine leader Oleksandr Moroz was utilised by Kuchma to attack Moroz, subjecting him to harassment from state media and tax authorities in order to discredit him during the 1999 campaign.

=== Economic crisis and reforms ===
While his mandate had been one to pursue anti-nationalist and bilingual policies, Kuchma sought to govern on a programme of economic liberalism. Kravchuk's first term had been dominated by economic liberalisation, debates over the adoption of the constitution of Ukraine and increased corruption. Kuchma's liberalisation efforts, led by Viktor Pynzenyk and Viktor Yushchenko, culminated in a 1996 monetary reform and austerity policies that reduced deficit spending and hyperinflation. These reforms, which were opposed by both large enterprises (on the basis that austerity had led to reduced corporate subsidies) and the leftist-dominated Verkhovna Rada (the parliament of Ukraine, which accused Kuchma of abandoning his previous leftist programme in favour of policies supported by the International Monetary Fund), were eventually abandoned after 1996, though Kuchma continued to insist that he supported such policies.

By 1999, most major economic problems remained unresolved, and the post-independence economic depression continued: issues of land ownership, large state-owned enterprises, high unemployment (growing to as much as one-third of the workforce by 2002) and low wages (equivalent to US$40 per month) remained important issues for the electorate. While GDP contraction had declined from a peak of 12.2% in 1995, with comparatively minor contractions of 3% in 1997, 1.9% in 1998 and 0.2% in 1999, perceptions of the economy as poorly-performing continued to hamper Kuchma's popularity.

=== Split in Rukh, Chornovil's death ===
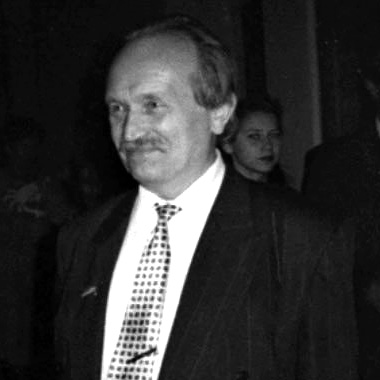
Viacheslav Chornovil, a competitor to Kuchma from the centre-right, was killed in a March 1999 traffic collision under disputed circumstances

The centre-right People's Movement of Ukraine (Ukrainian: Народний Рух України, romanised: Narodnyi Rukh Ukrainy, abbreviated Rukh) was a significant political force leading up to the 1999 election. The party's leader, former political prisoner Viacheslav Chornovil, was "the "main threat to power" for Kuchma according to human rights activist Adrian Karatnycky. At the Ninth Congress of Rukh in December 1998, Chornovil published the party's campaign strategy, advocating for greater focus on increasing support among the electorates of eastern and southern Ukraine. At the same congress, Chornovil declared his candidacy for the presidency, (Note: The Encyclopedia of Modern Ukraine has claimed that Chornovil refused to participate in the election, but this is rejected by historian Pavlo Hai-Nyzhnyk and Chornovil's son Taras.) alongside Hennadiy Udovenko. The final candidate of Rukh was to be determined at a later date.

Rukh was increasingly split between Chornovil's supporters and those who disapproved of him, with both sides feeling that the other was too close to Kuchma's government. Chornovil's supporters additionally accused the anti-Chornovil faction of being supported by the oligarchs and blamed Kuchma for organising the split, while his opponents saw Chornovil as disrespectful of party rules and accused him of an authoritarian leadership style. Yuriy Kostenko, a member of Rukh who had served as Minister of Environmental Protection in the Pustovoitenko government, removed Chornovil as leader of the parliamentary group of Rukh in a vote by the party's deputies before launching an effort to replace Chornovil as party leader. This infighting weakened the party ahead of the 1999 election. Hai-Nyzhnyk states that Chornovil withdrew his candidacy for the presidency in January 1999, while Taras Chornovil states that he was campaigning for president until his death.

On 25 March 1999, Chornovil was killed in a traffic collision near Boryspil International Airport while returning from a campaign speech in the city of Kirovohrad (now Kropyvnytskyi) when his car crashed into a lorry blocking the highway. The driver of the lorry was charged with recklessness and sentenced to prison before being amnestied. An investigation to determine whether Chornovil had been assassinated was launched in 2005, after the end of Kuchma's presidency. Investigations into Chornovil have since been repeatedly closed and reopened without consensus on whether or not he was assassinated.

== Candidates ==
According to Ukrainian electoral law, candidates may be nominated by a political party, an alliance of parties or a group of voters. Under the law, 200 delegates of a party or alliance must affirm the nomination of a candidate, while a meeting of 500 voters was necessary to nominate an independent candidate. Unlike previous elections, the 1999 elections required all candidates to obtain one million signatures, with 30,000 of these signatures coming from two-thirds of the twenty-six regions of Ukraine.

Fifteen candidates were initially nominated, of whom two (Kuchma and Yevhen Marchuk) were independents. Two of the candidates (Oleksandr Tkachenko and Volodymyr Oliinyk) dropped out, in line with a declaration made by the members of the Kaniv Four (comprising both of them alongside Marchuk and Oleksandr Moroz of the Socialist Party of Ukraine) to drop out in favour of the leading candidate. Political scientist Sarah Birch lists the final 13 candidates as being placed in the following political alignments:

Left-wing	Centrist	Right-wing
Petro Symonenko (KPU); Oleksandr Moroz (SPU); Nataliya Vitrenko (PSPU); Yurii Karmazin (PZV); Oleksandr Bazylyuk (SP)	Leonid Kuchma (Ind.); Yevhen Marchuk (Ind.); Vasyl Onopenko (SDPU(o)); Vitaliy Kononov (PZU)	Yuriy Kostenko (Rukh, anti-Chornovil); Hennadiy Udovenko (Rukh, pro-Chornovil)

In addition, Birch does not note two of the final candidates (Oleksandr Rzhavskyy and Mykola Haber) as being aligned with the left, right or centre. She further describes Kuchma and Marchuk as "centre-right".

=== Kuchma ===
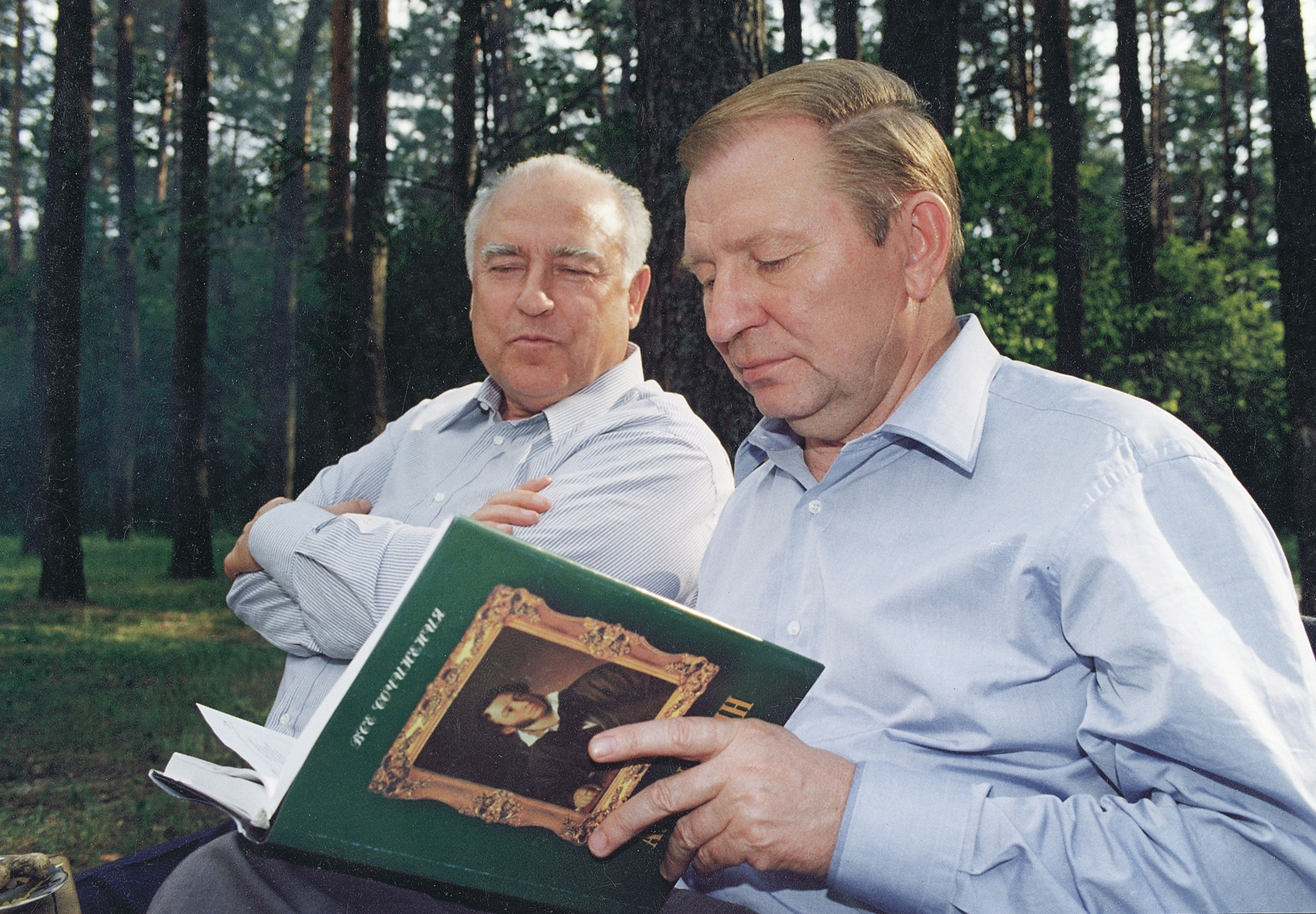
Leonid Kuchma (right) with former Russian prime minister Viktor Chernomyrdin, August 1999

Leonid Kuchma was born into a family of peasants in the northern Chernihiv Oblast. His early life was marked by World War II, during which his family was displaced by the destruction of his native village, as well as the intermingling of Ukrainian, Russian and Belarusian cultures. From 1960 he was involved in the Soviet Union's rocket industry, working at Pivdenmash from 1960 until his 1992 resignation, when he became prime minister. At the time of his resignation, he was the company's general director and a member of the nomenklatura. Kuchma's premiership had been marked by efforts to resolve the budget deficit and hyperinflation (at the time equivalent to 33% of Ukraine's GDP), as well as by infighting with president Leonid Kravchuk. Kuchma's efforts to resolve the economic slowdown failed, for which he blamed Kravchuk and his inner circle. Kuchma had won the 1994 Ukrainian presidential election campaigning on recognition of Russian as a co-official language and improved relations with Russia. After his election, however, he abandoned his campaign promises to pursue market reforms, which were also later watered down.

Invigorated by the increased powers granted to the presidency with the adoption of the constitution, Kuchma announced his intention to seek re-election in September 1996. He campaigned on the threat of a "red revanche", accusing Symonenko of opposing Ukrainian democracy and supporting Russian imperialism, the Holodomor, the Great Purge and Russia's military campaign in Chechnya. Kuchma, emulating Yeltsin's 1996 campaign in Russia, benefited from usage of administrative resources to his advantage, including by closing or suing opposition newspapers and through strong-arming banks and oligarchs into providing money for his re-election. In one instance, the Ukraïna bank, which had contributed the least to Kuchma's campaign funds up to that point, was placed under the control of the Security Service of Ukraine (Ukrainian: Служба безпеки України, romanised: Sluzhba bezpeky Ukrainy, SBU) in August–September 1998. Kuchma's campaign staff was bolstered by the involvement of several veteran "political technologists" of Yeltsin's 1996 campaign, including Timofey Sergeytsev, Dmitry Kulikov, Iskander Valitov and Gleb Pavlovsky.

=== Symonenko ===
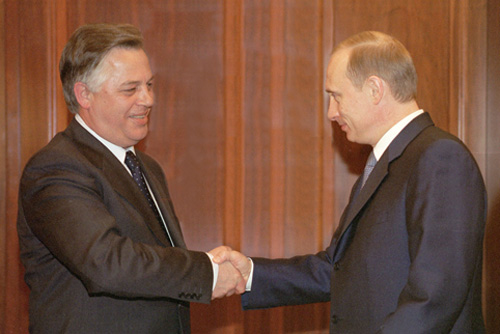
Petro Symonenko (left) and Russian president Vladimir Putin in 2002

Petro Symonenko was born in 1952 in the city of Donetsk. He graduated from Donetsk Polytechnic Institute with a degree in electromechanical engineering and initially worked as a coal miner before becoming a Komsomol employee in 1975. He continued to work in the Communist Party of the Soviet Union from 1975 to 1988, including on the Mariupol municipal committee of the CPSU and the Donetsk Regional Committee, where he served as second secretary. From 1991 to 1993 he was general director of coal mining company Ukrvuhlemash before being elected first secretary of the reestablished Communist Party of Ukraine (Ukrainian: Комуністична партія України, romanised: Komunistychna partiia Ukrainy, KPU) in 1993. While he had led the KPU to support Kuchma in 1994, Symonenko was frustrated with Kuchma's failure to pursue greater ties with Russia and particularly by his economic reforms.

Symonenko advocated for Soviet patriotism and nostalgia, increased welfare spending and Ukrainian membership in the Union State, a supranational union comprising Belarus and Russia. Symonenko's campaign faced several uphill struggles, including Symonenko's lack of charisma and the CPU's low support ceiling. In September 1999, Communist Party of the Russian Federation leader Gennady Zyuganov allegedly communicated to Symonenko a desire for him to withdraw and form a popular front led by Moroz and the SPU, believing that an outright KPU victory was impossible. Karatnycky likewise contends that Symonenko was "unelectable" and that his advance to the second round provided Kuchma the greatest opportunity for victory, and Birch notes that Symonenko "never really stood a chance against" Kuchma, and that the CPU's electoral ceiling was well below 50% of the electorate.

=== Moroz ===
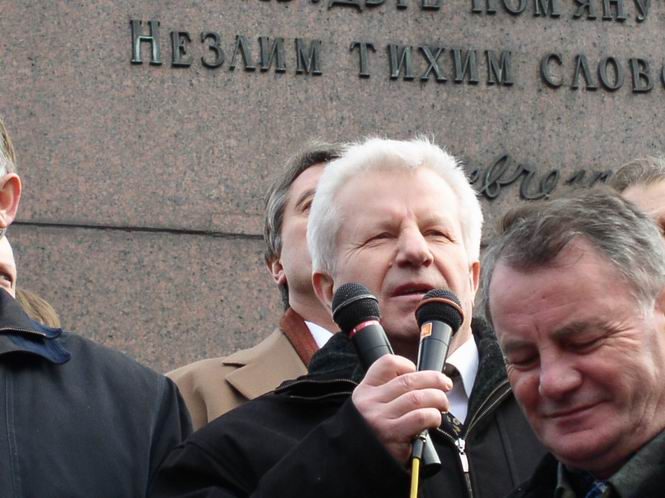
Oleksandr Moroz at a 2003 protest against Kuchma

Oleksandr Moroz, born in 1944, was the leader of the Socialist Party of Ukraine from its establishment, and a People's Deputy from 1990. He previously ran for president in 1994, during which time he obtained 13% of the vote. The SPU was critical of the one-party state and Soviet bureaucracy, while supporting a socialist economy and society and criticising the dissolution of the Soviet Union. Moroz accepted Ukrainian independence; he was known for his repeated usage of the adage "Anybody who does not regret the collapse of the USSR has no heart; anybody who wants to restore the Union today has no head".

Moroz campaigned on anti-corruption and improved social welfare, and had a public image as a morally upstanding politician. He sought to emulate Aleksander Kwaśniewski, the moderate leftist president of Poland. However, such efforts were stymied by a lack of centrist allies (particularly after the end of Lazarenko's political career) and the general unwillingness of most Ukrainian leftists to moderate their views. Such unwillingness had resulted in the party's left splitting and forming the Progressive Socialist Party in 1996. In spite of these divisions, Moroz remained Kuchma's strongest rival. Kuchma's campaign accused Moroz of financial improprieties and political violence, and, after Lazarenko left Ukraine, exploited the alliance between Moroz and Lazarenko to reduce the former's popularity. In an effort to combat Kuchma, Moroz formed the Kaniv Four alliance, comprising himself and three other centrist and leftist candidates. (Note: Yevhen Marchuk, Oleksandr Tkachenko and Volodymyr Oliinyk.) This strategy ultimately failed, as both Marchuk and Moroz refused to step down in the other's favour.

=== Vitrenko ===
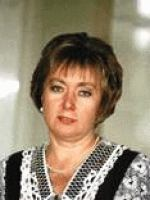
Nataliya Vitrenko in 1998

Nataliya Vitrenko was leader of the Progressive Socialist Party of Ukraine, a far-left breakaway from the SPU comprising dissidents who opposed Moroz's cooperation with Kuchma on writing the constitution of Ukraine. Vitrenko had led the PSPU in the 1998 Ukrainian parliamentary election with the slogan "We shall build a Soviet and Socialist Ukraine!". She was widely known by the derogatory epithet of "Konotop Witch", owing to her Verkhovna Rada constituency and the 1837 short story by Hryhorii Kvitka-Osnovianenko.

Vitrenko's campaign largely focused on anti-Western sentiment and economic concerns. Among her proposals were the closure of all borders and foreign bank accounts on the first day of her presidency, the removal of all IMF advisers and the deportation of "reformers" and "the bandit class" to Siberia. Harasymiw notes that "widely suspected" that Vitrenko's campaign had been encouraged by Kuchma's campaign staff in order to split the leftist vote. Wilson likewise describes Vitrenko as privately being backed by the presidential administration, while Kuzio reports that Kuchma had provided covert backing to Vitrenko since her 1996 split from the SPU and saw her as another preferable alternative to Moroz. Vitrenko was the only leftist candidate to receive significant coverage in state media during the election.

== Campaign ==
During the campaign Kuchma was supported by the Bloc "Our Choice – Leonid Kuchma!"

=== First round ===
==== Kaniv Four ====
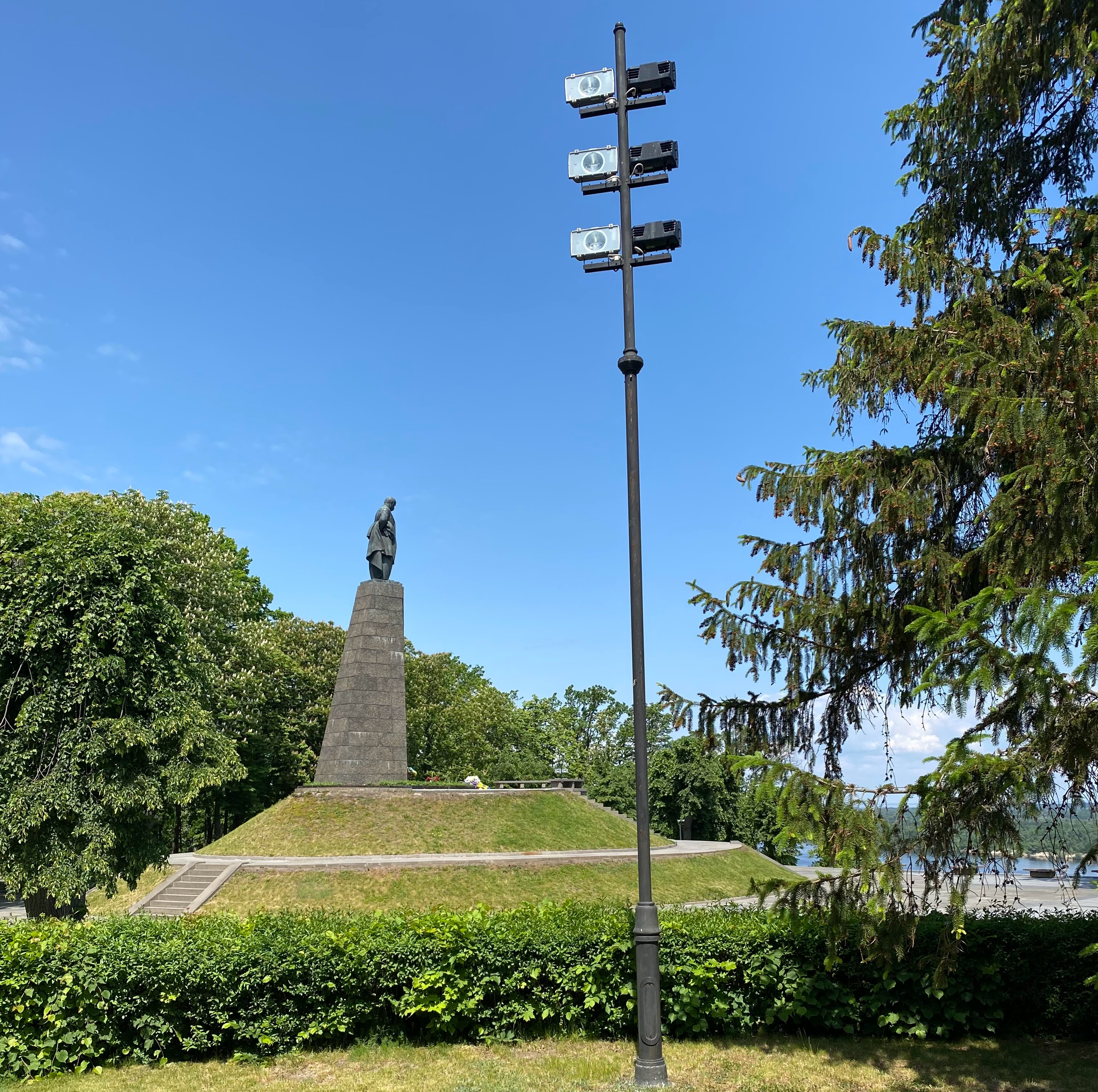
A monument to Taras Shevchenko on Taras Hill in Kaniv. The Kaniv Four gathered at Shevchenko's grave in Kaniv to announce the formation of the quadrumvirate.

On 24 August 1999 (Independence Day), Oleksandr Moroz, former head of the SBU and prime minister Yevhen Marchuk, chairman of the Verkhovna Rada Oleksandr Tkachenko and Cherkasy mayor Volodymyr Oliinyk gathered at the grave of Taras Shevchenko in the city of Kaniv to announce an electoral alliance, informally known as the Kaniv Four. The date and location were both chosen to separate the coalition from the KPU and PSPU and cast an image as patriotic leftists. The group vowed to drop out in favour of the candidate placed the highest in opinion polling at a date shortly prior to the election as part of an informal primary election.

While the Kaniv Four acquired significant media attention, they found themselves unable to gather the endorsement of right-wing candidates (who, according to Wilson, were largely being bankrolled by the presidential administration), though Marchuk maintained connections with dissident Rukh leader Yuriy Kostenko. Likewise, attempts to include Symonenko in the group were unsuccessful, as Symonenko generally retained consistently high polling numbers that would have made him the group's natural choice.

Karatnycky, citing an unnamed political consultant close to Kuchma, alleges that Kuchma's campaign staff deliberately engineered frictions within the Kaniv Four by leaking fake polls to Marchuk that showed him, rather than Moroz, as the leading candidate, leading Marchuk to demand his selection as the quadrumvirate's candidate. In 2000, Wilson accused Moroz of reneging on the alliance by refusing the agreement of the other three to support Marchuk, while noting that the presidential administration may have worked with any of the candidates behind the scenes to sow discord among the quadrumvirate. He later argued that Moroz had been double-crossed by Marchuk, who he alleges received support from the presidential administration. The alliance dissolved a few weeks before the first round of voting. Oliinyk endorsed Marchuk, while Tkachenko abandoned the quadrumvirate to support Symonenko.

==== Attempted assassination of Vitrenko ====
On 3 October, during a campaign rally in Dnipropetrovsk, an assailant threw a RGD-5 grenade at Vitrenko in an apparent assassination attempt. State media blamed Serhii Ivanchenko, a local organiser of Moroz's campaign, leading to a decrease in Moroz's support.

Several sources have described the attempt as a false flag, though it is disputed who organised the attack or what the intention of it was. Political scientist Taras Kuzio, noting that the RGD-5 grenade thrown at Vitrenko was a stun grenade, argues that it increased her popularity. In a later-released cassette tape secretly recorded by presidential bodyguard Mykola Melnychenko, an individual believed to be Kuchma admits to organising the attack to discredit Moroz, and Kuzio alleges that the attack was based on advice from Russian advisers. Shortly following the attack, two Russian individuals claimed responsibility, saying that they had been paid by Vitrenko to throw the grenade. Wilson notes this, as well as increased state media focus on Vitrenko's more eccentric positions, as causing a drop in her popularity.

=== Second round ===
The first round of the election occurred on 31 October 1999. Kuchma placed first with 38% of the vote, followed by Symonenko at 23% and Moroz at 11.8%. As no candidate gained a majority, the election went to a second round.

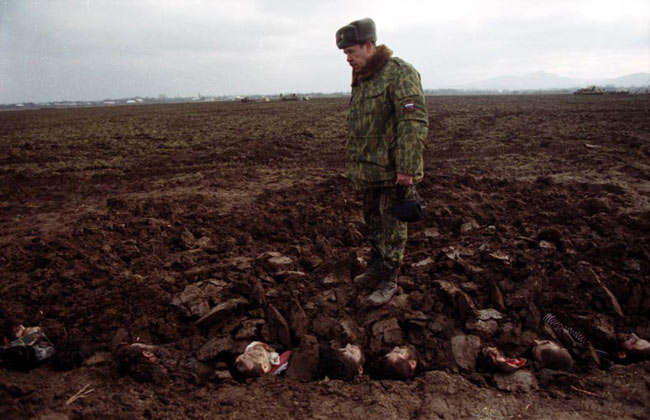
In the second round, Kuchma accused Symonenko of supporting Russian imperialism, including the Second Chechen War, and threatening Ukraine's independence

Facing Symonenko, Kuchma urged the national democrats and those supporting economic reforms to turn out against the left, tying himself to both independence and liberalisation. Kuchma placed particular importance on the memory of the man-made Holodomor famine, as well as casting the KPU as agents of both historical and contemporary Russian imperialism. This included tying the party to the Great Purge, the 1962 Novocherkassk massacre and the ongoing Second Chechen War. Kuchma's campaign extensively deployed black propaganda through leaflets purporting to represent the KPU, leading to a condemnation in the party's Komunist newspaper as part of an "arsenal of techniques from bourgeois countries". Both Kuchma and Symonenko engaged in extensive negative campaigning during the second round.

Marchuk endorsed Kuchma on 10 November and in exchange was named as secretary of the National Security and Defence Council, replacing longtime Kuchma ally Volodymyr Horbulin. Wilson compares Marchuk's role in the election to that of Alexander Lebed in the 1996 Russian presidential election, noting that Lebed had similarly been appointed to a government position with the expectation that his voters support the incumbent in the second round. Kostenko and Hennadiy Udovenko, the two rival leaders of Rukh, also endorsed Kuchma, as did minor candidates Oleksandr Rzhavskyy and Vitaliy Kononov.

In early November, Symonenko received the joint endorsement of Moroz, Tkachenko, Oliinyk, Karmazin and Haber. In return, Symonenko issued a pledge to respect Ukrainian independence and private enterprise as president. In the statement, which Wilson describes as "surpris[ing] virtually everybody", Symonenko compared himself to Polish president Aleksander Kwaśniewski and expressed support for a coalition of multiple parties in support of his presidency, as well as renunciation of the powers of the presidency and membership in the Union State. Though the appeal was widely shared in KPU press, it failed to make an impact due to how late in the election it had been published, that few saw the statement and, as Birch argues, that those who saw it were unlikely to have been convinced.

== Election ==
As in the previous election, the 1999 election was marked by a shift in the electorate of western Ukraine towards the incumbent, in a reversal of the region previously voting against Kuchma. By contrast, Symonenko failed to win an absolute majority in any of Ukraine's regions in the first round, reaching a peak of 47% in the eastern Luhansk Oblast. Moroz won in two regions (Vinnytsia and Poltava oblasts), while Vitrenko won in her native Sumy Oblast. Harasymiw argues that the 1999 election proved the non-existence of a west-east schism in Ukrainian presidential elections, arguing instead that western Ukraine was the only one of Ukraine's four regions to give decisive majorities to any singular candidate. Political scientist Kimitaka Matsuzato argues that the previous election's dominance of the left in eastern Ukraine had shifted to a central Ukrainian "Red Belt", while Dnipropetrovsk, Donetsk and Odesa oblasts shifted towards the anti-Kuchma "western camp".

In the second round, Kuchma's voters primarily comprised younger individuals, those who described themselves as "strong believers" in religion and residents of western Ukraine (86% of whom turned out for Kuchma). By contrast, Symonenko's supporters were generally elderly and from eastern Ukraine. All demographic groups polled by the Central Election Commission (religious adherence, age and region of residence) voted for Kuchma. Among first-round voters, 35% of Moroz's voters turned out for Kuchma, while 49% voted for Symonenko (16% voted against both); Vitrenko's supporters were split more evenly, with 45% voting for Kuchma and 48% voting for Symonenko. An additional two percent of Vitrenko voters claimed to the Central Election Commission to have voted for a third candidate in the second round. 63% of Marchuk voters in the first round voted for Kuchma in the second, compared to 22% for Symonenko. The remaining candidates' supporters almost exclusively transferred their votes to Kuchma in the second round. Kuchma also benefited from the unpopularity of communism in Ukraine; Wilson notes that over 40% of voters chose Kuchma as the lesser evil compared to Symonenko. Symonenko's largest support bases, according to Harasymiw, were social conservatives, leftists and supporters of Pan-Slavism, while Kuchma's voters were a heterogenous grouping largely united by support for economic liberalisation.

=== Conduct ===
The campaign was condemned by the Parliamentary Assembly of the Council of Europe as "a disgrace", with Kuchma's abuse of administrative and state resources (particularly state media) to benefit his reelection and prevent other candidates from organising being noted by both the PACE and the Organisation for Security and Co-operation in Europe. Independent television channel STB was subjected to government harassment, and opposition candidates' appearances on television were followed by comedy shows mocking them. Birch describes the state media treatment of Kuchma's opponents as a media blackout. The State Tax Service and police also engaged in harassment of independent press.

While Kuchma claimed campaign funds of only 1.7 million hryvnias (equivalent to US$372,000), Wilson alleges that he in fact had access to over US$1.5 billion as a result of money controlled by ally Oleksandr Volkov through a body known as the "Social Protection Fund". Contributors to the Social Protection Fund included Russian oligarch Boris Berezovsky, mobile operator Kyivstar (headed by Kuchma's daughter Olena) and son-in-law Viktor Pinchuk. Kuchma, through his daughter's former marriage, was also connected to the Franchuk patronage network in Crimea, which itself was tied to the Salem crime group, and both Volkov and Pinchuk were accused by the Verkhovna Rada of involvement in money laundering in September 1999 (the latter through the U.S.-based Bank of Boston and the Bank of New York, the former through Spanish bank accounts). Kuchma's campaign was additionally accused by opposition deputies of paying people to vote for Kuchma with the usage of state funds, a measure condemned by government newspapers Holos Ukrayiny and Uryadovy Kuryer.

Kuchma also attempted to utilise regional bureaucracies in order to influence turnout in his favour. Three oblast governors (Note: Dmytro Dvorkis of Vinnytsia Oblast, Oleksandr Kolesnikov of Poltava Oblast and Valeriy Kalchenko of Kirovohrad Oblast.) were fired after the first round, according to Birch as a result of insufficient voter turnout for Kuchma, though this did not significantly impact the results of the election. In Dnipropetrovsk, Donetsk and Odesa oblasts, the oblast administrations utilised government resources to encourage voters to turn out in Kuchma's favour. The practice was criticised by the OSCE, who noted that state employees (particularly healthcare workers and teachers) were coerced into voting for Kuchma, as well as by supporters of Kuchma, such as George Soros.

== Results ==
Candidate	Party	First round		Second round	
Candidate	Party	Votes	%	Votes	%
Leonid Kuchma	Independent	9,598,672	37.99	15,870,722	57.70
Petro Symonenko	Communist Party of Ukraine	5,849,077	23.15	10,665,420	38.77
Oleksandr Moroz	Socialist Party of Ukraine	2,969,896	11.75		
Nataliya Vitrenko	Progressive Socialist Party of Ukraine	2,886,972	11.43		
Yevhen Marchuk	Independent	2,138,356	8.46		
Yuriy Kostenko	Independent	570,623	2.26		
Hennadiy Udovenko	Rukh–Reforms and Order	319,778	1.27		
Vasyl Onopenko	Social Democratic Party of Ukraine (united)	124,040	0.49		
Oleksandr Rzhavskyy	One Family	96,515	0.38		
Yuriy Karmazin	Motherland Defenders Party	90,793	0.36		
Vitaliy Kononov	Party of Greens of Ukraine	76,832	0.30		
Oleksandr Bazyliuk	Slavic Party	36,012	0.14		
Mykola Haber	Patriotic Party of Ukraine	31,829	0.13		
Against all		477,019	1.89	970,181	3.53
Total		25,266,414	100.00	27,506,323	100.00
Valid votes		25,266,414	96.05	27,506,323	97.50
Invalid/blank votes		1,038,749	3.95	706,161	2.50
Total votes		26,305,163	100.00	28,212,484	100.00
Registered voters/turnout		37,498,630	70.15	37,680,581	74.87
Source: Nohlen & Stöver

First round results
Kuchma	37.99%
Symonenko	23.15%
Moroz	11.75%
Vitrenko	11.43%
Others	9.84%
Against all/invalid	5.84%

Second round results
Kuchma	57.70%
Symonenko	38.77%
Against all/invalid	6.03%

=== Results by region ===
Regions won by Leonid Kuchma
Regions won by Petro Symonenko
Regions won by Oleksandr Moroz
Regions won by Nataliya Vitrenko

Election results by region, percentages (first round)
	Leonid Kuchma		Petro Symonenko		Oleksandr Moroz		Nataliya Vitrenko		Yevhen Marchuk	
Region	#	%	#	%	#	%	#	%	#	%
Crimea	308,501	34.35	338,053	37.64	21,218	2.36	81,665	9.09	56,893	6.34
Vinnytsia	181,635	17.11	204,393	19.25	359,306	33.84	98,718	9.30	99,867	9.41
Volyn	313,193	51.49	31,683	5.21	25,519	4.20	69,340	11.40	86,516	14.22
Dnipropetrovsk	756,152	39.12	558,848	28.91	193,875	10.03	189,849	9.82	41,016	2.12
Donetsk	778,104	31.96	959,183	39.40	153,406	6.30	280,172	11.51	48,881	2.01
Zhytomyr	254,751	30.91	179,985	21.85	158,442	19.24	87,192	10.59	35,288	4.28
Zakarpattia	299,696	54.73	18,327	3.35	45,599	8.31	25,121	4.59	91,279	16.67
Zaporizhzhia	317,305	30.74	317,783	30.79	96,317	9.33	156,035	15.12	47,167	4.57
Ivano-Frankivsk	570,541	70.38	12,056	1.49	22,182	2.74	28,304	3.49	86,343	10.65
Kyiv	378,767	36.49	94,712	9.13	221,115	21.30	146,258	14.09	79,066	7.76
Kirovohrad	149,667	22.97	637,490	47.15	134,390	20.62	77,750	11.93	50,558	7.76
Luhansk	386,557	28.59	637,490	47.15	78,422	5.80	113,167	8.37	25,994	1.92
Lviv	1,012,067	64.06	37,869	2.40	42,511	2.69	40,876	2.59	291,719	18.46
Mykolaiv	217,774	33.65	202,616	31.31	51,055	7.89	82,469	12.74	33,576	5.19
Odesa	395,973	36.93	265,834	24.79	898,75	8.38	121,518	11.33	67,515	6.30
Poltava	197,487	19.57	219,703	21.77	264,063	26.17	142,578	14.13	54,058	5.36
Rivne	299,201	45.77	32,013	4.90	49,968	7.64	53,733	8.22	80,107	12.26
Sumy	219,468	26.68	157,459	19.14	89,888	10.93	243,498	29.60	37,721	4.58
Ternopil	496,384	69.38	9,880	1.38	14,867	2.08	20,435	2.86	104,201	14.56
Kharkiv	438,123	28.07	512,994	32.87	124,580	7.98	161,503	10.35	172,051	11.02
Kherson	187,356	30.15	218,125	35.11	71,496	11.51	62,540	10.07	14,167	2.28
Khmelnytskyi	266,963	30.25	127,439	14.44	133,093	15.08	128,971	14.61	124,463	14.10
Cherkasy	174,615	20.64	161,135	19.04	172,128	20.34	123,813	14.63	121,482	14.36
Chernivtsi	238,628	51.00	38,471	8.22	31,574	6.75	54,659	11.68	51,764	11.06
Chernihiv	202,640	25.57	179,224	22.61	127,551	16.09	128,217	16.18	72,257	9.12
Kyiv city	486,887	38.86	93,278	7.45	191,411	15.28	144,912	11.57	152,078	12.14
Sevastopol	57,037	34.51	56,691	34.40	4,748	2.87	21,409	12.95	8,955	5.42
Foreign electoral district	13,200	53.64	1,169	4.75	1,397	5.68	2,270	9.22	3,374	13.71
TOTALS:	9,598,672	37.99	5,849,077	23.15	2,969,896	11.75	2,886,972	11.43	2,138,356	8.46

Election results by region, percentages (second round) (Note: Invalid and against all votes not included.)
	Leonid Kuchma		Petro Symonenko	
Region	#	%	#	%
Crimea	434,738	43.98	506,302	51.22
Vinnytsia	359,833	33.90	628,399	59.20
Volyn	479,344	75.44	121,922	19.19
Dnipropetrovsk	1,181,358	56.35	798,380	38.08
Donetsk	1,557,340	52.90	1,213,694	41.23
Zhytomyr	394,896	48.06	377,119	45.89
Zakarpattia	657,314	84.53	75,148	9.66
Zaporizhzhia	473,731	44.83	525,042	49.69
Ivano-Frankivsk	859,839	92.30	41,769	4.48
Kyiv	617,704	58.51	362,530	34.34
Kirovohrad	278,644	40.92	358,010	52.58
Luhansk	598,522	40.74	791,408	53.87
Lviv	1,623,941	91.59	91,307	5.15
Mykolaiv	300,881	45.90	322,225	49.16
Odesa	620,075	52.83	476,847	40.63
Poltava	355,382	35.20	582,249	57.66
Rivne	541,209	76.52	121,894	17.23
Sumy	409,352	48.53	365,737	43.36
Ternopil	727,359	92.17	38,167	4.84
Kharkiv	772,210	46.64	769,221	46.46
Kherson	267,271	41.89	337,438	52.28
Khmelnytskyi	446,681	50.95	367,950	41.97
Cherkasy	334,245	39.95	437,389	52.28
Chernivtsi	375,996	73.21	110,069	21.43
Chernihiv	293,358	37.47	440,505	56.27
Kyiv city	790,392	64.84	317,567	26.05
Sevastopol	94,710	50.17	82,479	43.69
Foreign electoral district	24,397	79.73	4,653	15.21
TOTALS:	15,870,722	57.70	10,665,420	38.77

== Aftermath ==
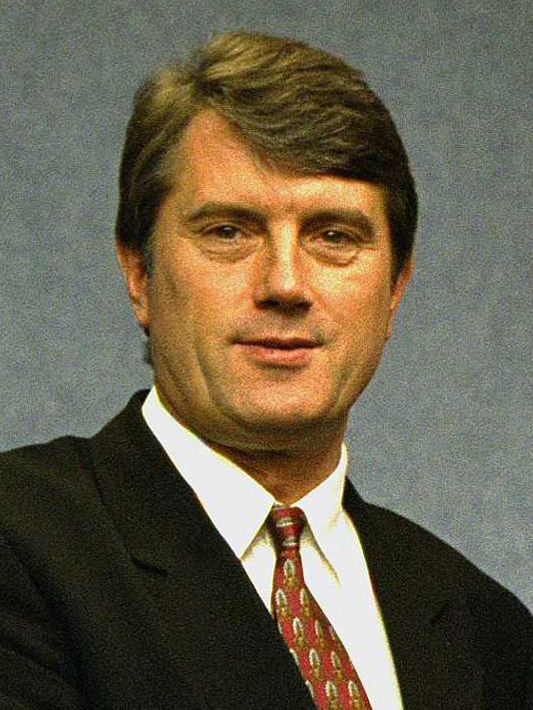
Viktor Yushchenko was appointed prime minister of Ukraine after Kuchma's re-election, and pursued a programme of economic liberalisation

Harasymiw notes the 1999 election as bringing "Mexicanisation" to Ukrainian politics, with an increase in corruption, corporate dominance, clienteleism and strongman rule. In order to lift the Verkhovna Rada's block on reforms, Kuchma sought to increase presidential powers in a 2000 constitutional referendum.

After his re-election, Kuchma described his second presidential term as "Kuchma-2" and claimed that he would place increased attention on economic reform. After initially considering the re-appointment of Valeriy Pustovoitenko as prime minister, he appointed former National Bank of Ukraine head Viktor Yushchenko to the premiership in December 1999. Yushchenko, along with deputy prime minister for energy Yulia Tymoshenko, pursued economic liberalisation, payment of pensions and wages which had previously been unpaid, and increased transparency in privatisations. Yushchenko's premiership was opposed by Russian president Vladimir Putin and pro-Russian Ukrainian politicians (who saw his marriage to an American woman and his support for a Ukrainian national identity as problematic), as well as the oligarchs (who were targeted by Yushchenko and Tymoshenko's efforts to attack economic elites). Conversely, Ukraine's Western partners (particularly the United States, where vice president Al Gore had advised Kuchma to appoint Yushchenko as prime minister) supported Yushchenko's economic reforms, and his ties to international financial institutions and Atlanticist, pro-European positions were assets that led to improved relations with the West.

Following the 1999 election, the KPU's popularity declined steeply, with Soviet nostalgia fading as a political force and political elites feeling increasingly connected to a Ukrainian national identity. The left came under increasing attack, with Tkachenko being stripped of his security detail and access to transport and telephones provided to People's Deputies, with a resumption of the investigation into the 1994 disappearance of US$70 million that had been dropped following Tkachenko's appointment as chairman of the Verkhovna Rada in 1998. Also stripped of his official privileges was Adam Martyniuk, the first deputy chairman of the Verkhovna Rada and a member of the KPU. Both were removed from their parliamentary leadership positions, with Tkachenko being replaced by Ivan Plyushch of the pro-Kuchma People's Democratic Party.

In the autumn of 2000, a series of cassette tapes were released by presidential bodyguard Mykola Melnychenko. The tapes, alleged to be of Kuchma, include discussion of voter intimidation in order to ensure Kuchma's victory and implicated him in the September 2000 murder of investigative journalist Georgiy Gongadze. The tapes were played by Moroz before the Verkhovna Rada on 28 November 2000, sparking a political scandal and crisis and popular protests.
