= People's Opposition Bloc of Natalia Vitrenko =

Ukrainian political bloc

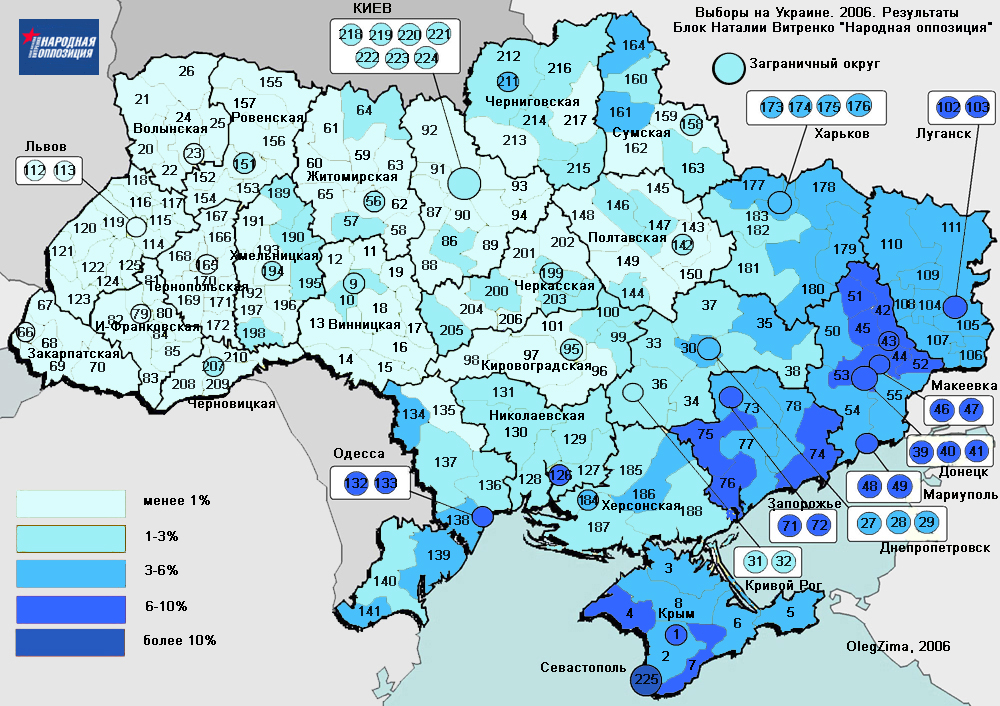
A map showing the results of the People's Opposition Bloc of Natalia Vitrenko party in Ukraine's oblasts during the parliamentary election.

The People's Opposition Bloc of Natalia Vitrenko, (Ukrainian: Blok Natalii Vitrenko Narodna Opoziciya) was a political alliance in Ukraine led by Natalia Vitrenko.

It consisted of:

- Progressive Socialist Party of Ukraine (Progresivna Sotsyalistychna Partiya Ukrayiny)
- Party "Rus'-Ukrainian Union" (Partiya "Rus'ko-Ukrayins'kyj Soyuz" (Rus'))

== Conclusion ==
At the parliamentary election, 26 March 2006, it won 2.93% of the popular vote (less than the 3% electoral threshold, and hence no seats).
