= Vitaliy Kononov =

Ukrainian politician and environmental activist

- Віталій Кононов
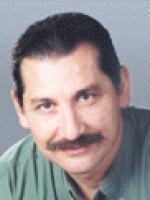

People's Deputy of Ukraine
- In office 12 May 1998 – 14 May 2002
- Constituency: Party of Greens of Ukraine, No. 1

Personal details
- Born: 2 April 1950 (age 76) Kobuleti, Adjarian ASSR, Georgian SSR, Soviet Union (now Adjara, Georgia)
- Party: Party of Greens of Ukraine
- Profession: Engineer (Kyiv Polytechnic Institute)

Vitaliy Mykolayovych Kononov (Ukrainian: Віталій Миколайович Кононов; born 2 April 1950) is a Georgian-Ukrainian politician and environmental activist who served as a People's Deputy of Ukraine from the Party of Greens of Ukraine from 1998 to 2002, heading the party's electoral list.

== Early life ==
Kononov was born on 2 April 1950 in Kobuleti, which was then part of the Georgian SSR in the Soviet Union. His father, Mykola, was a military serviceman and his mother, Tetiana, was a physician and pensioner. In 1974, Kononov graduated from the Kyiv Polytechnic Institute within the Faculty of Chemical Technology, receiving the specialty of technologist of organic synthesis.

After graduating, he worked at the Ukrainian branch of the Dolgoprudnensky OPU of the all-union trust "Orghim" (a chemical product producer) as a master and later head of a section until 1990. Then, from 1990 to 1997, he worked at the cruise company "Chervona Ruta" in Kyiv (who also founded the Chervona Ruta festival), serving as its Deputy Director.

== Political career ==
In 1990, he became a member of the Party of Greens of Ukraine (PZU). From 1990 to 1992 he served as its co-chairman, and then from 1992 to 2006 served as its chairman and was involved in the apparatus of the party. He also became a deputy of the Kyiv City Council, where he was a member of the cultural commission, serving for one term from 1990 to 1994. During the 1998 Ukrainian parliamentary election, he was elected from the PZU as candidate no. 1 on the party list, serving as the head of the PZU parliamentary faction, until his term ended in April 2001.

Kononov was a candidate in the 2004 Ukrainian presidential election, nominated by the Party of Greens of Ukraine, which he then chaired. He was a People's Deputy of Ukraine, and been concerned with issues such as youth politics, physical training and sport. Since 1999, he has been a member of the Board of Ukrainian-wide union of democratic forces "Consent". He was also a presidential candidate in the 1999 Ukrainian presidential election, receiving 0.29% of the votes and finished 11th of 13 candidates.

In his election program, Kononov supports transition to parliamentary-presidential government, and he actively speaks in support of environmental protection.

Political offices
Preceded by Yuriy Shcherbak	Leader of Party of Greens of Ukraine; 1992–2006	Succeeded by Volodymyr Kosterin
