= Oleksandr Volkov (politician) =

Ukrainian politician

- Олександр Волков
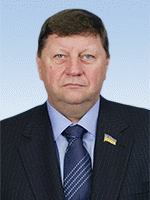
- Official portrait, 2012

People's Deputy of Ukraine
- In office 12 December 2012 – 27 November 2014
- Preceded by: Constituency established
- Succeeded by: Oleksandr Suhoniako
- Constituency: Sumy Oblast, No. 158
- In office 15 September 1998 – 14 May 2002
- Preceded by: Constituency established
- Succeeded by: Constituency abolished
- Constituency: Chernihiv Oblast, No. 208

Personal details
- Born: 30 April 1948 Kyiv, Ukrainian SSR, Soviet Union
- Party: Party of Regions (1999–2001, since 2012)
- Other political affiliations: Independent (2002, 2003–2012); Democratic Union (2001–2002); Social Democratic Party of Ukraine (united) (2002–2003); For United Ukraine! (2002)

Oleksandr Mykhailovych Volkov (Ukrainian: Олександр Михайлович Волков, born 30 April 1948) is a Ukrainian politician who served as a People's Deputy of Ukraine from 2012 to 2014. He previously served as a People's Deputy from 1998 to 2006, representing Ukraine's 208th electoral district in Chernihiv Oblast.

== Political activity ==
March 1998 - candidate for the People's Deputy of Ukraine from the "Bloc of Democratic Parties - NEP", No. 7 on the list.

Member of the Parliament of Ukraine of the 3rd convocation from September 1998 to April 2002, constituency No. 208, Chernihiv region. Member of the group "Renaissance of Regions" (February 1999 - April 2001; since February 2000 - group leader), head of the faction of the party "Democratic Union" (since April 2001). Member of the Committee on Healthcare, Maternity and Childhood (February 1999 - February 2000), member of the Committee on Legislative Support of Law Enforcement (since February 2000).

Member of the Parliament of Ukraine of the 4th convocation from April 2002 to April 2006, constituency #208, Chernihiv region, nominated by the Electoral Bloc of Political Parties "Democratic Party of Ukraine - Democratic Union Party". 35.82 % in favor, 11 opponents. At the time of the election: Member of Parliament of Ukraine, member of the Democratic Union party. Member of the United Ukraine faction (May–October 2002), unaffiliated (October 2002), member of the SDPU(O) faction (October 2002-January 2003). Member of the Committee on Environmental Policy, Nature Management and Elimination of the Consequences of the Chornobyl Disaster (since June 2002).

Member of the Parliament of Ukraine of the 7th convocation since December 2012, constituency 158, Sumy region, self-nominated. 40.14 % in favor, 10 opponents. Member of the Party of Regions faction (since December 2012). Deputy Chairman of the Committee on Budget (since December 2012). In the elections to the Verkhovna Rada of the 7th convocation, he betrayed the vast majority of his voters, which caused considerable indignation among the residents of Sumy.

== Personal life ==
He is married with three children.
