= Public image =

Public image may refer to:

- Reputation
  - Reputation management
  - Public relations, maintaining a desirable public image for high-profile people and organizations
- The Public Image, a novel by Muriel Spark
- Public Image Ltd, a post-punk English musical group, with lead singer John Lydon of the Sex Pistols
  - Public Image (album), the debut album by Public Image Ltd
  - "Public Image" (song), by Public Image Ltd
