= Oleksandr Rzhavskyy =

Ukrainian politician (1959–2022)

People's Deputy of Ukraine
- In office 12 May 1998 – 14 May 2002
- Preceded by: Constituency established
- Succeeded by: Andriy Klyuyev
- Constituency: Donetsk Oblast, No. 46

Personal details
- Born: 30 January 1959; Kramatorsk, Donetsk Oblast, Ukrainian SSR, USSR
- Died: 27 March 2022 (aged 63); Bucha, Kyiv Oblast, Ukraine

Oleksandr Mykolayovych Rzhavsky (Ukrainian: Олександр Миколайович Ржавський; 30 January 1959 – 27 March 2022) was a pro-Russian Ukrainian politician who served as a member of the Verkhovna Rada (Ukrainian parliament) from 1998 until 2002.

Rzhavsky was also candidate in the 2004 Ukrainian presidential election, nominated by the "United Family" Party, of which he was the head. Presidential candidate in 1999, when he won 0.37% of the votes, and finished in 9th place.

He was vice-chair of the board of Montazhspetsbank in 1996–97, and president of Koral Bank in 1997–98. In his program, he promised to establish order in Ukraine, using the methods of Russian President Vladimir Putin. On 13 February 2022 he published on his Facebook profile a comment, where he rhetorically asked "why Russians didn't act the same way as fascist occupiers in Crimea", arguing with the notion of Russia as an occupier.

On 27 March 2022 he was killed by soldiers of the 64th Separate Guards Motor Rifle Brigade during the Russian invasion of Ukraine at his estate in Bucha, Kyiv Oblast, as part of the Bucha massacre. According to his daughter, he had been abducted twice from his estate by Russian soldiers who had demanded a ransom and, during a drunken binge, had shot him dead. The killing was witnessed by his family who posted an official statement on Rzhavsky's Facebook profile.

Russian media denied killing Rzhavsky on 27 March and on 11 April published an undated recording of Rzhavsky claiming it was recorded on 30 March. On 12 April Investigative Committee of Russia declared it will include the recording in its "investigation on the Bucha fakes" after which Rzhavsky's name disappeared from Russian state media coverage, while Russian bloggers continued claiming he was indeed killed, but by "Ukrainian nationalists".
