= Sponsor =

Sponsor or sponsorship may refer to:

- Sponsor (commercial), supporter of an event, activity, or person
- Sponsor (legislative), a person who introduces a bill
- Sponsor (beetle), a genus of beetles
- Child sponsorship, form of charitable giving
- Ship sponsor
- Sponsor of baptism, see godparent
- Sponsorship in a twelve-step program
- "Sponsor" (song), a song by Teairra Marí
- Sponsor (TV series), a 2021 South Korean television series
- Sponsor (2019 film), a Burmese drama film
- Sponsor (upcoming film), an American psychological thriller film

== See also ==
- Sponsored walks / walkathons, class of charitable fundraising/publicity activities
