= Party "Rus" =

Ukrainian political party

Rus' Political Party Політична партія «Русь»
- Leader: Ivan Nechyporuk
- Founded: September 30, 1998
- Headquarters: Liubech, Chernihiv Oblast
- Ideology: Liberal conservatism
- Colors: yellow, blue

Party flag
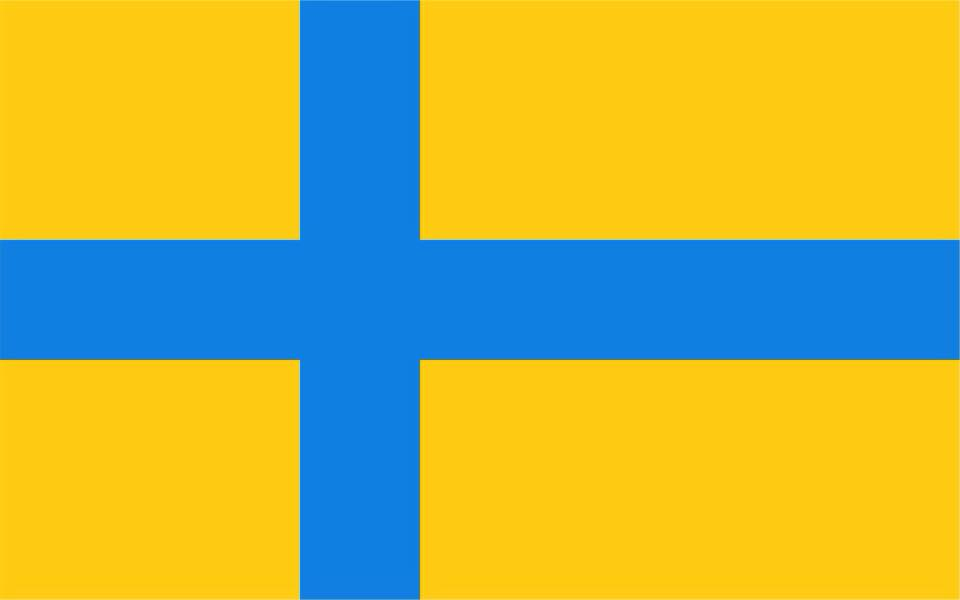

Website
- hvylya.org (archived)

Rus' (Ukrainian: Політична партія «Русь») is a minor Ukrainian liberal conservative political party founded in 1998, with Ivan Symonenko elected as its first leader. It has no representation in the Verkhovna Rada and is currently led by Ivan Nechyporuk.

== Program ==
At the Congress of the Party "Rus" held in November 2013 was adopted a party program based on the following principles:

- The restoration of Ukraine's historical name "Rus - Ukraine" (English: Ruthenia);
- Holding a nationwide referendum over the adoption of the Constitution of the Republic of Rus- Ukraine based on the principles of the Party's Programme "Rus" adopted in November 2013;
- The formation of the civil society - a broad stratum of economically independent and politically proactive citizens taking an active part in political, social and economic society transformation processes;
- Creation of a new type of democracy based on the direct democracy principle;
- Creation of a state apparatus built upon the electronic state model - information disclosure between the State and the Citizen;
- Territorial and administrative reform, local self-government development at the regions and communities level, local government red tape reduction, regional superfluous bureaucratic branches elimination;
- Reform of the Court and the Prosecutor's Office - introduction of the local judges' elective principle, liquidation of the specialized courts, limiting prosecutors' powers to prosecution duties only;
- Restriction of the state regulatory function in the economy, formation of a clear tax system that encourages small and medium business development;
- Support of the family, encouraging childbirth and adopting orphans.
- Overall education and health system reformation, education and health services equal access principle revival;
- Support for the idea of the unification of the traditional Christian churches under the Apostolic See.

In the foreign policy the Party "Rus" highlighted the following principles:

- Support for the European Union–Ukraine Association Agreement, further development of the European Union
- based on the principles set by the applicable agreements and declared in the Programme;
- Political and military alliance accession NATO as the only modern world security and territorial integrity guarantee;
- Formation of the bilateral relations with other countries on the principles of equality, partnership and good neighborliness;
- In the distant future the creation of the confederal union with the countries of Eastern and Northern Europe which because of the historical tradition share the values proclaimed in the political Programme "Rus" and in the future State Constitution "Rus-Ukrayina/Ruthenia."

== History ==
- 1997, April - The founding congress of the party took place. Ivan Symonenko was elected as the leader of the party.
- 1998, 30 September - the party was officially registered at the Ministry of Justice of Ukraine.
- 2002 - The party participated in the parliamentary elections for the first time. The "Ruthenian Block" including the party "Rus'" received 0.73% of the votes and failed to enter the Verkhovna Rada.
- 2006 - the party participated in the parliamentary election with Natalia Vitrenko's People's Opposition block. But received 2.93% of votes, and again failed to be represented in the parliament. The defeat at the parliamentary polls and the party's ideology crisis led to its split and deep crisis. The party top echelon's pro-Russian orientation did not coincide with the majority of its members' opinions at that time.
- 2006 Summer - split in the block of Natalia Vitrenko's " People's Opposition" party. "Rus'" withdraws its membership.
- 2009, 20 June - 7th party congress takes place.
- 2009, 4 August - the VIIth Congress decision on the name and party leadership changes were approved by the Ministry of Justice of Ukraine under the decree No. 1392/ 5.

Starting from the summer of 2009 there is a profound restructuring and reformation of the party.

- 2010 - Party " Rus" took part in the local self-government elections in Berdiansk, and received the support of 4.7% of the voters.
- 2013, November - Party's congress adopted a new program "Rus " and acceded to the "Declaration of the Republic of Rus-Ukraine " - civil movement which goal is to adopt a new state constitution of the "Republic of Rus-Ukraine" by referendum.

== Links ==
- Party Official Site
