= United Ukraine =

Ukrainian political party (1998–2005)

United Ukraine (Ukrainian: Єдина Україна) was a political party in Ukraine.

== History ==
The party was founded in 1998 as Party of Educators of Ukraine (Ukrainian: Партія Освітян України); it was officially registered as a party on 26 October 1998. At the legislative 2002 elections the party was part of the Nataliya Vitrenko Bloc with Progressive Socialist Party of Ukraine. The alliance won 3.22% of the votes, little short of passing the 4% threshold needed to enter the Verkhovna Rada (Ukraine's parliament).

In July 2004 Bohdan Hubsky (at the time a People's Deputy of Ukraine (Note: Elected into the Verkhovna Rada in 2002 for Social Democratic Party of Ukraine (united).)) was elected party leader and the party was renamed United Ukraine. On 22 September 2004 in the Verkhovna Rada a new faction "United Ukraine" was created by Hubsky on the basis of the faction "Democratic Initiatives - Democracy". It had 17 members. The party supported Viktor Yanukovych during the Ukrainian presidential election of 2004.

On 26 November 2005, the party dissolved itself and merged into Batkivshchyna. On 18 October 2013 the party was de-registered at the Ukrainian Ministry of Justice.
