= Progressive Socialist Party of Ukraine =

Banned political party in Ukraine

- Ukrainian name: Прогресивна соціалістична партія України Prohresyvna sotsialistychna partiia Ukrainy
- Russian name: Прогрессивная социалистическая партия Украины Progressivnaya sotsialisticheskaya partiya Ukrainy
- Abbreviation: PSPU
- Leader: Nataliya Vitrenko
- Founded: 1996
- Banned: 20 March 2022; 27 September 2022 (final appeal in court dismissed)
- Split from: Socialist Party of Ukraine
- Headquarters: Melitopol
- Youth wing: Young Guard of the PSPU
- Ideology: Marxism–Leninism; National Bolshevism; Left-wing populism; Pan-Slavism; Eurasianism; Hard Euroscepticism; Russophilia; Anti-Americanism
- Political position: Far-left
- National affiliation: Left Opposition (2015–2022)
- International affiliation: Eurasian Youth Union; All-Russia People's Front
- Colors: Red and blue

Party flag

Website
- vitrenko.org (archived)

The Progressive Socialist Party of Ukraine (PSPU) (Note: Ukrainian: Прогресивна соціалістична партія України, romanized: Prohresyvna sotsialistychna partiya Ukrayiny; Russian: Прогрессивная социалистическая партия Украины, romanized: Progressivnaya sotsialisticheskaya partiya Ukrainy) is a banned, pro-Russian political party in Ukraine led by Nataliya Vitrenko. The party was represented in Ukraine's national parliament between 1998 and 2002. The party is considered neo-communist and wants to restore state ownership of industry and workers' democracy in Ukraine. Due to ideological ties to Aleksandr Dugin, it has also been described by some observers as being National Bolshevik.

The Progressive Socialist Party was described to have a "clearly leftist" platform. Its campaign slogan was "We shall build a Soviet and Socialist Ukraine!". The party was considered Russophile, and campaigned for a "strategic partnership" of Ukraine with Russia and Belarus, while strongly rejecting the prospect of cooperating with either the European Union or NATO. The party was least popular in Western regions, but it had considerable support in South Ukraine.

== History ==
The party was created by Nataliya Vitrenko, a then dissident member of the Socialist Party of Ukraine (SPU) in April 1996. She led a group of more radical SPU members who opposed what they regarded as revisionist tendencies in the Socialist Party. In October 1995 they had left that party.

The Progressive Socialist Party of Ukraine is a party that supports the Eurasian Economic Union as an alternative to the EU and uses left-wing rhetoric. PSPU traditionally campaigns on an anti-NATO, anti-IMF and pro-Russian platform. During the 1998 parliamentary elections the party won 4.04% of the vote and 16 seats. The party's candidate for the 1999 presidential elections, Nataliya Vitrenko, came 4th, with 10.97% of the vote in the first round.

The party's parliamentary faction was dissolved in February 2000.

At the legislative elections on 30 March 2002, the party established the Nataliya Vitrenko Bloc alliance, including the Party of Educators of Ukraine (Ukrainian: Партія Освітян України). It won 3.22% of the votes, little short of passing the 4% threshold needed to enter the Verkhovna Rada. PSPU was a vocal opponent of President Leonid Kuchma but supported Viktor Yanukovych, Ukrainian prime minister since 2002, during the 2004 elections. After the Orange Revolution of 2004, the party joined the opposition to new president Viktor Yushchenko in a coalition with the "Derzhava" (State) party led by former Ukrainian prosecutor Gennady Vasilyev. In the March 2006 parliamentary elections, the party again failed to gain any seats in Parliament, participating as People's Opposition Bloc of Natalia Vitrenko winning 2,93%. At the 2007 parliamentary elections the party failed once more to enter the parliament, its result dropped to 1,32%.

In the run-up to the 2010 presidential election the Progressive Socialist Party of Ukraine refused to join the Bloc of Left and Center-left Forces since it did not want to be in the same election bloc as the Socialist Party of Ukraine. Instead the party tried to nominate Natalia Vitrenko again as their candidate in that election but the Central Election Commission of Ukraine refused to register her for failure to pay the required 2.5 million hryvnya nomination deposit. Eventually the Progressive Socialist Party of Ukraine supported Party of Regions leader Viktor Yanukovych in the runoff of the 2010 presidential election.

During the 2010 Ukrainian local elections, the party only won three representatives in the Sevastopol municipality.

The party did not participate in the 2012 parliamentary elections.

In 2011, the PSPU decided to join the People's Front for Russia.

The party did not participate in the 2014 parliamentary elections.

The party took part in the October 2015 Ukrainian local elections as part of the umbrella party Left Opposition.

In the 2020 local elections the party did not nominate candidates for deputies at all except for a candidate for mayor of Romny.

On 20 March 2022, the PSPU was one of several political parties suspended by the National Security and Defense Council of Ukraine during the Russian invasion of Ukraine, along with Derzhava, Left Opposition, Nashi, Opposition Bloc, Opposition Platform — For Life, Party of Shariy, Socialist Party of Ukraine, Union of Left Forces, and the Volodymyr Saldo Block.

In June 2022 various court proceedings tried to ban the parties suspended on 20 March 2022. The Progressive Socialist Party of Ukraine was one of two parties that actively opposed its banning (the other party was Opposition Platform — For Life). On 27 September 2022, the final appeal against the party's ban was dismissed by the Supreme Court of Ukraine, meaning that the party was fully banned in Ukraine.

== Election results ==
=== Presidential elections ===
Presidency of Ukraine
Election year	Candidate	First round		Second round	
Election year	Candidate	No. of overall votes	% of overall vote	No. of overall votes	% of overall vote
1999	Nataliya Vitrenko	2,886,972	10.97		
2004	Nataliya Vitrenko	429,794	1.53		

=== Rada electoral results ===
Verkhovna Rada (year links to election page)
Year	Votes	%	Seats
1998	1,075,118	4.05	16
2002	836,198	3.23	0
2006	743,704	2.93	0
2007	309,008	1.33	0

=== Rada election results maps ===
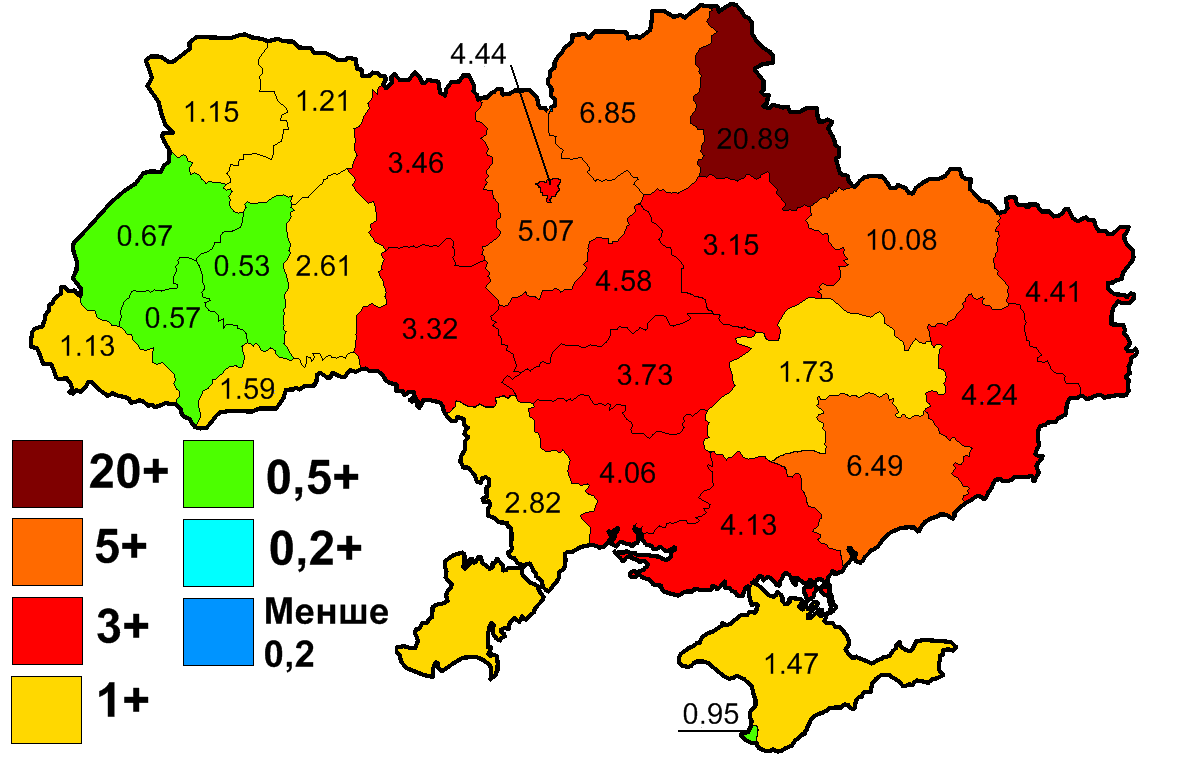
1998

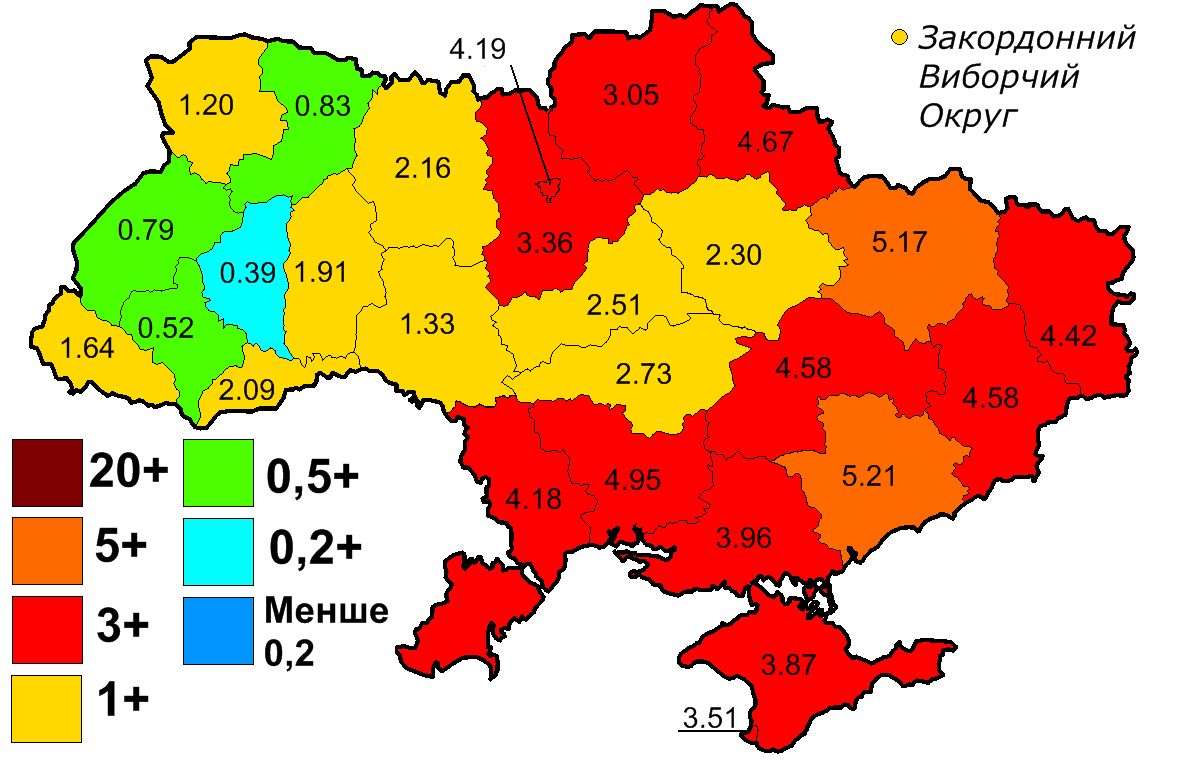
2002

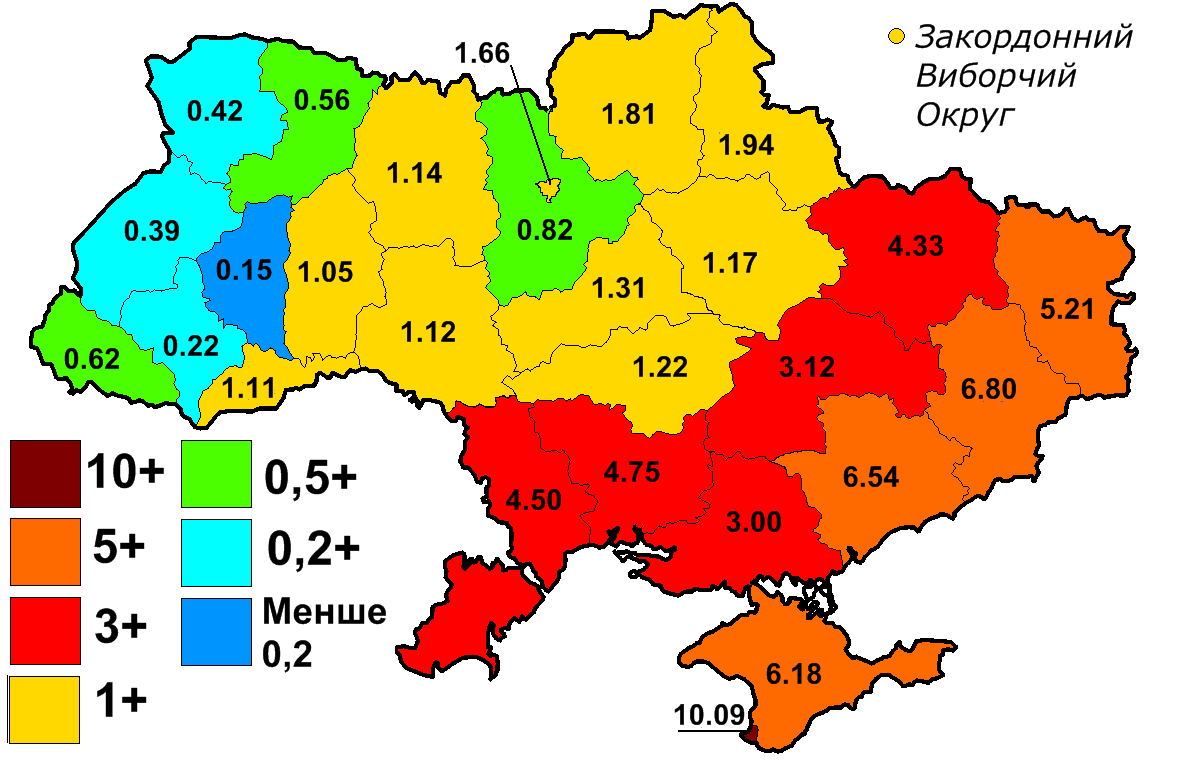
2006

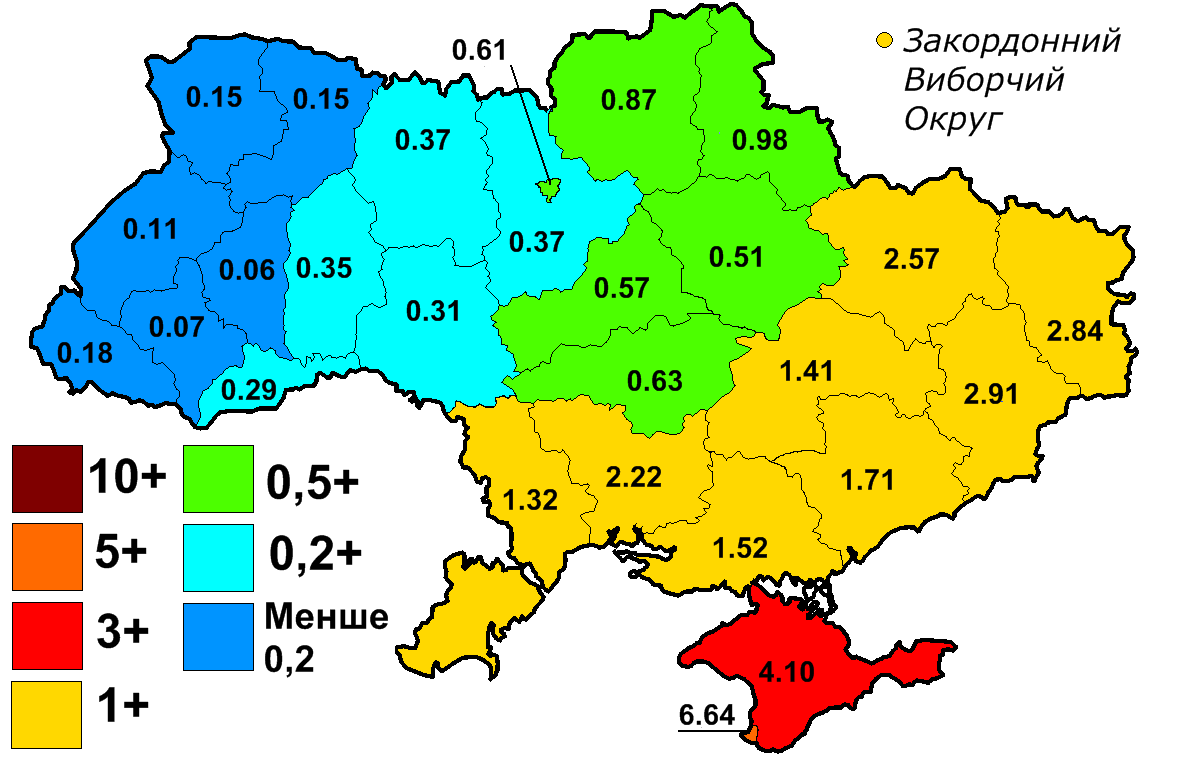
2007

== Ideology ==
The party favored Ukraine's full-scale entry in the Eurasian Economic Community (including its Customs Union); the protection of the non-aligned status of Ukraine; abolition of NATO exercises in Ukraine; asserting the Russian language status as an official language beside Ukrainian; the annulment of former President Viktor Yushchenko's decrees on awarding the title of Hero of Ukraine to Stepan Bandera and Roman Shukhevych.

The Progressive Socialist Party of Ukraine is considered a neo-communist party, defined as an East European socialist party that distances itself from reformist post-communist parties. The party supports the economic and social principles of communism while criticising the capitalist transition, post-Soviet democratisation and European integration.

The party is considered to represent a distinctive, radical form of left-wing, socialist populism. The party describes itself as the only "true Marxist" party in Ukraine and campaigns on a strongly nostalgic, anti-Western platform. It accuses the IMF of colonizing Ukraine and argues for expulsion of all western advisers from Ukraine. The party's ideological discourse is strongly anti-capitalism, anti-market and also anti-NATO.

PSPU considers the economic transformation of Ukraine into a capitalist economy to be a social regression. The party calls for state ownership of the means of production and an economy based on social justice, described as the elimination of unemployment and the distribution of material goods to their direct creators. The party also calls for "a society in which the free development of each is a condition for the free development of all, committing itself to establishing workers' democracy in enterprises, guaranteeing state ownership of basic industries and halting the privatisation process and halting the decline of kolkhozes and sovkhozes".

The party had close ties with the Eurasian Youth Union and its leader Aleksandr Dugin.
