= Nataliya Vitrenko =

Ukrainian politician and scientist (born 1951)

- Наталя Вітренко
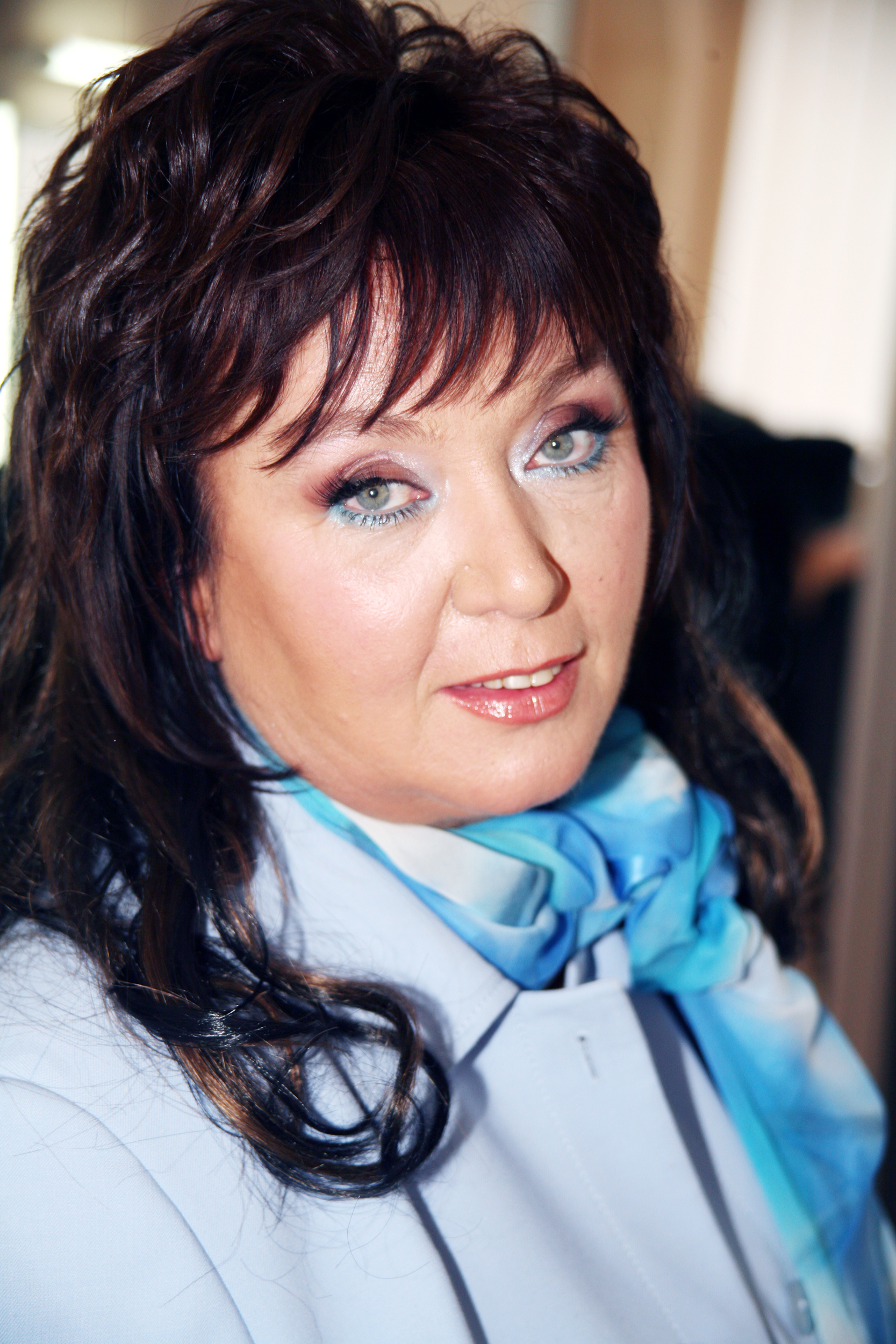
- Vitrenko in November 2006

Member of the Verkhovna Rada
- In office 18 January 1995 – 14 May 2002

Personal details
- Born: Nataliya Mikhailivna Vitrenko; 28 December 1951 (age 74) Kyiv, Soviet Union
- Children: Yuriy Vitrenko

Nataliya Mykhailivna Vitrenko (Ukrainian: Натáлія Михáйлівна Вітрéнко; born December 28, 1951) is a pro-Russian Ukrainian politician and scientist, who served as the Member of the Verkhovna Rada from 1995 to 2002.

Since 2014, Nataliya Vitrenko has been living in Moscow. She blames the West and Ukraine for charging of Russo-Ukrainian War.

== Presidential candidacy ==
Born in Kyiv, she was a candidate in the 2004 Ukrainian presidential election, nominated by the Progressive Socialist Party of Ukraine, which she has chaired since 1996. In the 2002 Ukrainian parliamentary election, her party won 3.22% of the votes. She was a presidential candidate in 1999, when she won 11% of the votes to finish in 4th place. In the 2004 elections, however, she finished in fifth place and received less than 5% of the vote.

On October 2, 1999, Vitrenko was attacked and wounded following a campaign rally when two unknown assailants threw two hand grenades at a crowd gathered outside one of her campaign events.

Natalia Vitrenko was again nominated by the Progressive Socialist Party of Ukraine as candidate for the 2010 Ukrainian presidential election but the CECoU (Central Election Commission of Ukraine) refused to register her for failure to pay the required 2.5 million hryvnya nomination deposit. Vitrenko did not agree with the refusal, submitted a complaint to the judge and before his very eyes tore down the Ukrainian constitution as a protest. On November 11, 2009, Vitrenko said: "Ukraine is condemned either to collapse, or to make a revolution. To Ukrainian government, Constitution of Ukraine is nothing but toilet paper."

Vitrenko's 1999 campaign was characterized by The Ukrainian Weekly as "fierce populism, nostalgia for the Soviet era, and strong anti-Western sentiments".

== Involvement with Lyndon LaRouche ==
Andrew Madison, writing in Vremya Novostei, said that Vitrenko's ideological foundations were partially American in origin, because along with the Marxism she was also influenced by the ideas of Lyndon LaRouche. On her political website, Vitrenko says that she has very similar views to LaRouche on the sinister role of the International Monetary Fund and the dollarization of speculative capital, which she says has become a threat to humanity. She attended a conference in 1995 in Germany, organized by Lyndon LaRouche and Helga Zepp-LaRouche, which passed a "Memorandum of humanity" drafted by Vitrenko.

== Political positions ==
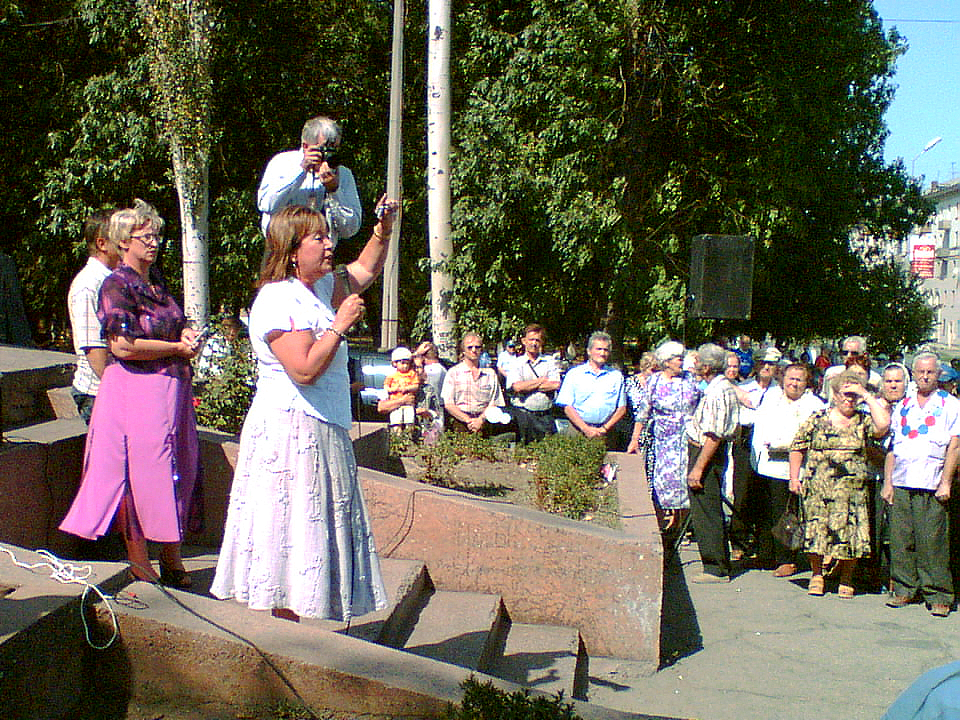
Vitrenko at the meeting in Alchevsk, Ukraine, September 2008

Vitrenko is a member of the Eurasian Youth Union, a group led by Russian philosopher Alexandr Dugin.

== Personal life ==
She is a mother of three children. Including Yuriy Vitrenko. In 2021, she accused her son Yuriy of Russophobia.
