= 2015 in the United States =

- Decades: 1990s; 2000s; 2010s; 2020s; 2030s
- See also: History of the United States (1991–2016); Timeline of United States history (2010–present); List of years in the United States

== Incumbents ==
=== Federal government ===
- President: Barack Obama (D-Illinois)
- Vice President: Joe Biden (D-Delaware)
- Chief Justice: John Roberts (Maryland)
- Speaker of the House of Representatives:

John Boehner (R-Ohio) (until October 29)
Paul Ryan (R-Wisconsin) (starting October 29)

- Senate Majority Leader:

Harry Reid (D-Nevada) (until January 3)
Mitch McConnell (R-Kentucky) (starting January 3)

- Congress: 113th (until January 3), 114th (starting January 3)

==== State governments ====
Governors and lieutenant governors

=== Governors ===
- Alabama: Robert J. Bentley (Republican)
- Alaska: Bill Walker (Independent)
- Arizona: Jan Brewer (Republican) (until January 5), Doug Ducey (Republican) (starting January 5)
- Arkansas: Mike Beebe (Democratic) (until January 13), Asa Hutchinson (Republican) (starting January 13)
- California: Jerry Brown (Democratic)
- Colorado: John Hickenlooper (Democratic)
- Connecticut: Dan Malloy (Democratic)
- Delaware: Jack Markell (Democratic)
- Florida: Rick Scott (Republican)
- Georgia: Nathan Deal (Republican)
- Hawaii: David Ige (Democratic)
- Idaho: Butch Otter (Republican)
- Illinois: Pat Quinn (Democratic) (until January 12), Bruce Rauner (Republican) (starting January 12)
- Indiana: Mike Pence (Republican)
- Iowa: Terry Branstad (Republican)
- Kansas: Sam Brownback (Republican)
- Kentucky: Steve Beshear (Democratic) (until December 8), Matt Bevin (Republican) (starting December 8)
- Louisiana: Bobby Jindal (Republican)
- Maine: Paul LePage (Republican)
- Maryland: Martin O'Malley (Democratic) (until January 21), Larry Hogan (Republican) (starting January 21)
- Massachusetts: Deval Patrick (Democratic) (until January 8), Charlie Baker (Republican) (starting January 8)
- Michigan: Rick Snyder (Republican)
- Minnesota: Mark Dayton (Democratic)
- Mississippi: Phil Bryant (Republican)
- Missouri: Jay Nixon (Democratic)
- Montana: Steve Bullock (Democratic)
- Nebraska: Dave Heineman (Republican) (until January 8), Pete Ricketts (Republican) (starting January 8)
- Nevada: Brian Sandoval (Republican)
- New Hampshire: Maggie Hassan (Democratic)
- New Jersey: Chris Christie (Republican)
- New Mexico: Susana Martinez (Republican)
- New York: Andrew Cuomo (Democratic)
- North Carolina: Pat McCrory (Republican)
- North Dakota: Jack Dalrymple (Republican)
- Ohio: John Kasich (Republican)
- Oklahoma: Mary Fallin (Republican)
- Oregon: John Kitzhaber (Democratic) (until February 18), Kate Brown (Democratic) (starting February 18)
- Pennsylvania: Tom Corbett (Republican) (until January 20), Tom Wolf (Democratic) (starting January 20)
- Rhode Island: Lincoln Chafee (Democratic) (until January 6), Gina Raimondo (Democratic) (starting January 6)
- South Carolina: Nikki Haley (Republican)
- South Dakota: Dennis Daugaard (Republican)
- Tennessee: Bill Haslam (Republican)
- Texas: Rick Perry (Republican) (until January 20), Greg Abbott (Republican) (starting January 20)
- Utah: Gary Herbert (Republican)
- Vermont: Peter Shumlin (Democratic)
- Virginia: Terry McAuliffe (Democratic)
- Washington: Jay Inslee (Democratic)
- West Virginia: Earl Ray Tomblin (Democratic)
- Wisconsin: Scott Walker (Republican)
- Wyoming: Matt Mead (Republican)

=== Lieutenant governors ===
- Alabama: Kay Ivey (Republican)
- Alaska: Byron Mallott (Independent)
- Arkansas: vacant (until January 13), Tim Griffin (Republican) (starting January 13)
- California: Gavin Newsom (Democratic)
- Colorado: Joseph Garcia (Democratic)
- Connecticut: Nancy Wyman (Democratic)
- Delaware: Matthew Denn (Democratic) (until January 6), vacant (starting January 6)
- Florida: Carlos Lopez-Cantera (Republican)
- Georgia: Casey Cagle (Republican)
- Hawaii: Shan Tsutsui (Democratic)
- Idaho: Brad Little (Republican)
- Illinois: Sheila Simon (Democratic) (until January 12), Evelyn Sanguinetti (Republican) (starting January 12)
- Indiana: Sue Ellspermann (Republican)
- Iowa: Kim Reynolds (Republican)
- Kansas: Jeff Colyer (Republican)
- Kentucky: Crit Luallen (Democratic) (until December 8), Jenean Hampton (Republican) (starting December 8)
- Louisiana: Jay Dardenne (Republican)
- Maryland: Anthony Brown (Democratic) (until January 21), Boyd Rutherford (Republican) (starting January 21)
- Massachusetts: vacant (until January 8), Karyn Polito (Republican) (starting January 8)
- Michigan: Brian Calley (Republican)
- Minnesota: Yvonne Prettner Solon (Republican) (until January 5), Tina Smith (Democratic) (starting January 5)
- Mississippi: Tate Reeves (Republican)
- Missouri: Peter Kinder (Republican)
- Montana: Angela McLean (Democratic)
- Nebraska: John E. Nelson (Republican) (until January 8), Mike Foley (Republican) (starting January 8)
- Nevada: Brian Krolicki (Republican) (until January 5), Mark Hutchison (Republican) (starting January 5)
- New Jersey: Kim Guadagno (Republican)
- New Mexico: John Sanchez (Republican)
- New York: Kathy Hochul (Democratic) (starting January 1)
- North Carolina: Dan Forest (Republican)
- North Dakota: Drew Wrigley (Republican)
- Ohio: Mary Taylor (Republican)
- Oklahoma: Todd Lamb (Republican)
- Pennsylvania: Jim Cawley (Republican) (until January 20), Michael J. Stack III (Democratic) (starting January 20)
- Rhode Island: Elizabeth Roberts (Democratic) (until January 6), Daniel McKee (Democratic) (starting January 6)
- South Carolina: Yancey McGill (Democratic) (until January 14), Henry McMaster (Republican) (starting January 14)
- South Dakota: Matt Michels (Republican)
- Tennessee: Ron Ramsey (Republican)
- Texas: David Dewhurst (Republican) (until January 20), Dan Patrick (Republican) (starting January 20)
- Utah: Spencer Cox (Republican)
- Vermont: Phil Scott (Republican)
- Virginia: Ralph Northam (Democratic)
- Washington: Brad Owen (Democratic)
- Wisconsin: Rebecca Kleefisch (Republican)

== Events ==
=== January ===
- January 1
  - New laws that go into effect on January 1:
    - Under Provisions of the Patient Protection and Affordable Care Act, The Centers for Medicare and Medicaid Services begins using the Medicare fee schedule to give larger payments to physicians who provide high-quality care compared with cost.
    - California's affirmative consent law goes into effect.
    - California bans revenge porn.
    - Louisiana's law allowing 16- and 17-year-old people to register to vote.
    - New York bans photography with big cats.
    - Nevada schools can now deny driver's licenses to students who skip classes.
    - Illinois requires e-cigarettes to be sold behind-the-counter.
    - Several states raise their minimum wages; Arkansas, Connecticut, Florida, Ohio, Maryland, Massachusetts and Rhode Island.
  - Restaurant chain Chick-fil-A reveals that credit card information from up to 9,000 transactions in five states may have been stolen.
- January 3 – The 114th Congress begins, and, as per the 2014 elections, the Republican Party holds majority control of both the Senate and the House of Representatives.
- January 5 – Groundbreaking and construction begin on the $68 billion California High-Speed Rail System, with the new transportation line planning to connect Los Angeles and San Francisco by 2029, reaching speeds of up to 200 mph (320 km/h).
- January 6
  - Federal judge James R. Spencer sentences former Governor of Virginia Bob McDonnell to two years in prison on federal corruption charges.
  - A gunman fatally shoots a doctor at a VA hospital in El Paso, Texas, before committing suicide.
- January 12
  - The Ohio State Buckeyes defeat the Oregon Ducks to win the inaugural College Football Playoff National Championship at AT&T Stadium in Arlington, Texas, by a score of 42–20.
  - A federal judge rules that South Dakota's ban on same-sex marriage is unconstitutional, and immediately stays the ruling.
  - Bruce Rauner is sworn in as the 42nd governor of Illinois, replacing Pat Quinn.
- January 14
  - The FBI arrests an Ohioan man for threatening to stage an ISIS-inspired attack on the United States Capitol.
  - A collision between a train and a prison transport bus near Penwell, Texas leaves at least eight prisoners and two corrections officers dead.
- January 15 – The nominations for the 87th Academy Awards are announced at the Samuel Goldwyn Theater in Beverly Hills, California. The nominees for Best Picture are American Sniper, Birdman, Boyhood, The Grand Budapest Hotel, The Imitation Game, Selma, The Theory of Everything, and Whiplash.
- January 16 – The Supreme Court announces it will hear four appellate rulings whether there is a constitutional right to same-sex marriage. Oral arguments will take place in April and a ruling may occur by June.
- January 18 – K.C. Undercover and Star vs. the Forces of Evil debuts on Disney Channel and Disney XD.
- January 20 – President Barack Obama delivers his State of the Union Address to the United States Congress.
- January 23
  - The U.S. Southern District of Alabama strikes down the state ban on same-sex marriage in Alabama, saying it has violated equal protection and due process rights.
  - The Supreme Court announces it will review the lethal injection protocol used by Oklahoma, which inmates suggest violate the Eighth Amendment's prohibition of cruel and unusual punishment.
- January 26–27 – A blizzard hits the Northeast, shutting down major cities including New York City and Boston, with up to 60 million people affected.

=== February ===
- February 1 – Amid accusations of cheating, the New England Patriots beat the Seattle Seahawks 28–24 in Super Bowl XLIX at the University of Phoenix Stadium in Glendale, Arizona.
- February 3
  - A collision between a commuter train and a passenger vehicle kills six in Valhalla, New York.
  - The 11th Circuit Court of Appeals refuses to stay a judge's ruling overturning the banning of same-sex marriage in Alabama, but Alabama Supreme Court Chief Justice Roy Moore states the next day that the state is not required to issue same-sex marriage licenses.
- February 5 – American electronics retail store franchise RadioShack files for Chapter 11 bankruptcy protection after 11 consecutive quarterly losses.
- February 10
  - U.S. officials announce that in light of the Houthi takeover of the Yemeni capital city of Sana'a and the resignation of Yemeni President Abd Rabbuh Mansur Hadi, the United States will be closing its embassy in Yemen. All American diplomats working in Yemen are advised to evacuate.
  - NBC announces that NBC Nightly News host Brian Williams has been suspended for six months due to revelations that he greatly embellished stories of his role in a helicopter incident in Iraq on the air.
- February 11
  - Police arrest suspected shooter Craig Stephen Hicks for killing a Muslim family of three in Chapel Hill, North Carolina. Police state that the shooting was motivated by a long-standing neighbor dispute over parking.
  - The New England Journal of Medicine publishes research from the American Cancer Society that mortality due to cigarette smoking in the United States may be substantially greater than previously thought when adding in associations with diseases that have not been formally established as caused by smoking.
- February 13 – Oregon Governor John Kitzhaber announces his resignation (effective February 18) amid allegations his fiancée used taxpayer resources to aid her green-energy consulting business. Kate Brown moves up to Governor from being the Secretary of State.
- February 14 – The New York Police Department reports no murders in New York City over a 12-day period for the first time in the city's history, citing the recent storms and extreme weather events as the possible reason.
- February 16
  - A Moscow-based security software company, the Kaspersky Lab, discovers the NSA's ability to hide spying software in hard drives made by several top manufacturers in the computers of users from 30 different countries.
  - A federal district court judge in Brownsville, Texas, temporarily halts President Barack Obama's executive orders on immigration, allowing Texas and 25 other states to file a lawsuit opposing the orders.
- February 17 – Ashton Carter is sworn in as the 25th Secretary of Defense, replacing Chuck Hagel.
- February 19 - The long running 12-year sitcom Two and a Half Men comes to an end with the Finale.
- February 20 – Charles Bothuell IV and Monique Dillard-Bothuell are charged with torture and child abuse of Charles Bothuell V.
- February 22
  - In stock car racing, Joey Logano wins the Daytona 500 (extended to 203 laps due to a green-white-checkered finish), making him the second youngest winner of the race after Trevor Bayne, and giving Team Penske their second Daytona 500 victory. Jeff Gordon (in his final season as a full-time driver) leads the most laps with a total of 87 out of 200 and also wins his second pole for the race, and his first since 1999.
  - The Academy of Motion Pictures Arts and Sciences hold the 87th Academy Awards in the Dolby Theatre in Hollywood, hosted by Neil Patrick Harris. The telecast garners nearly 37.3 million viewers.
    - Birdman wins four awards out of nine nominations, including the awards for Best Picture and its director Alejandro González Iñárritu for Best Director. Wes Anderson's The Grand Budapest Hotel also wins four awards.
    - Eddie Redmayne wins the award for Best Actor for his performance in The Theory of Everything.
    - Julianne Moore wins the award for Best Actress for her performance in Still Alice.
- February 24
  - Alaska's law legalizing the private use, but not sale of, recreational marijuana goes into effect.
  - A passenger train collides with a truck in Oxnard, California after a driver mistakenly turned onto the tracks. The train engineer died and 32 passengers and crew members were injured.
- February 26
  - The U.S. Federal Communications Commission (FCC) rules in favor of net neutrality by applying Title II (common carrier) of the Communications Act of 1934 and Section 706 of the Telecommunications act of 1996 to the Internet.
  - The voter-elected legalization of possession and private use of recreational marijuana is put into effect in Washington, D.C.
  - A gunman kills seven people then himself in a spree shooting in Tyrone, Missouri.

=== March ===
- March 2 – Federal judge Joseph Bataillon strikes down Nebraska's ban on same-sex marriage, pending an appeal by the 8th Circuit Court of Appeals.
- March 3
  - Israeli Prime Minister Benjamin Netanyahu gives a speech in front of Congress attempting to deter the Obama administration from the current negotiated deal for a nuclear program for Iran.
  - Former CIA director and U.S. Army officer David Petraeus pleads guilty in federal court to a charge of unauthorized removal and retention of classified information.
  - The Food and Drug Administration (FDA) states that neither the benefits nor the safety of testosterone have been established for low testosterone levels due to aging and has required that testosterone pharmaceutical labels include warning information about the possibility of an increased risk of heart attacks and stroke.
- March 6 – The Dawn spacecraft enters orbit around Ceres, becoming the first spacecraft to orbit a dwarf planet.
- March 9
  - President Barack Obama signs an executive order declaring Venezuela a national security threat to the U.S.
  - A letter signed by 47 Republican senators to the leadership of Iran in regards to Iran's nuclear program, warns Iran that according to the US Constitution any foreign treaty made by a president of the United States without congressional approval can be overturned by a future elected president.
- March 11 – In Missouri, a gunman identified as Jeffery L. Williams shoots two policemen in front of the Ferguson city police headquarters.
- March 12 – The Federal Communications Commission releases the specific details of the net neutrality rules.
- March 19 – Scientists, including an inventor of CRISPR, urge a worldwide moratorium on using gene editing methods to genetically engineer the human genome in a way that can be inherited, writing "scientists should avoid even attempting, in lax jurisdictions, germline genome modification for clinical application in humans" until the full implications "are discussed among scientific and governmental organizations.".
- March 23
  - The U.S. Supreme Court affirms Wisconsin's law requiring voters to present photo identification to cast a ballot.
  - Texas Senator Ted Cruz announces his run for the Republican nomination in the 2016 presidential election.
  - The first ever all-girls youth tackle football league in the United States, the Utah GFL, is started.
- March 25
  - The US Army charges US Army soldier Bowe Bergdahl, who was held captive by the Taliban-aligned Haqqani network in Afghanistan from June 2009 until his release in May 2014, with desertion and misbehavior before the enemy.
  - Indiana Governor Mike Pence signs Indiana SB 101 into law, prompting a national debate over religious freedom and LGBT rights. After a week of public outcry, the law is modified and similar bills in Arkansas, North Carolina, Georgia, and North Dakota fail to pass their state legislatures.
- March 29 – WWE holds WrestleMania 31 at Levi's Stadium in Santa Clara, California, drawing a crowd of 76,976.

=== April ===
- April 1 – Governor Jerry Brown of California signs an executive order mandating that the state reduce its water use by 25% in an effort to confront the severe drought affecting the region.
- April 4 – Walter Scott, an unarmed black man, is shot and killed by a police officer in North Charleston, South Carolina. The officer, Michael Slager, is charged with Scott's murder. The event was filmed by a bystander.
- April 5 – A controversial Rolling Stone article by Sabrina Erdely is retracted after an investigation by the Columbia University Graduate School of Journalism concludes that the story around which the article is centered was fabricated and exhibited confirmation bias. Rolling Stone makes no firings in accordance with the retraction.
- April 7 – Kentucky Senator Rand Paul announces his run for the Republican nomination in the 2016 presidential election.
- April 8 – A jury finds Dzhokhar Tsarnaev guilty for his role in perpetrating the Boston Marathon bombing in 2013.
- April 11 – President Barack Obama and Cuban President Raúl Castro discuss historic proposed normalizations to Cuba–United States relations at the 7th Summit of the Americas in Panama City, Panama.
- April 12 – Hillary Clinton announces her run for the Democratic nomination in the 2016 presidential election, the first major Democrat to announce a campaign.
- April 13
  - The U.S. Federal Communications Commission publishes the final rule on its new net neutrality regulations.
  - The sentencing retrial of Joia Arias concludes in Arizona. Arias had been convicted of the murder of Travis Alexander in 2013 and is sentenced to life imprisonment without the possibility of parole, having narrowly avoided the death penalty.
  - Florida Senator Marco Rubio announces his run for the Republican nomination in the 2016 presidential election.
- April 14 – President Barack Obama moves forward with removing Cuba from the State Sponsors of Terrorism list in light of his efforts to normalize relations with the country.
- April 23 – Shayna Hubers is convicted of the 2012 murder of her boyfriend Ryan Poston in Lexington, Kentucky. Hubers had shot Poston six times and tried to claim she acted in self-defense.
- April 25-May 3 – Protests in Baltimore, Maryland, from Baltimore City Hall to the Inner Harbor against the April 19 death of Freddie Gray in police custody soon turn violent, with extensive property damage, looting, numerous arrests, and injuries of both police officers and citizens being reported. Maryland Governor Larry Hogan declares a state of emergency in the city and deploys the Maryland National Guard in response.
- April 27 – A teacher, Brady Olson, at North Thurston High School in Washington stops a student from going on a shooting rampage.
- April 28 – The Supreme Court hears arguments regarding the issue of whether the Constitution guarantees the right to marriage to same-sex couples.
- April 29
  - In a 5–4 decision, the Supreme Court rules in favor of states' right to ban elected judges from soliciting campaign contributions for their own campaigns, the first instance of the court supporting regulations on campaign financing in recent years.
  - Senator Bernie Sanders announces his run for the 2016 presidential nomination in an address on the Capitol lawn.
- April 30
  - A group of health professionals and human rights activists release evidence suggesting that the American Psychological Association worked closely with the CIA, the Department of Defense, and the George W. Bush administration to provide legal and ethical justifications for the use of torture against prisoners in the early years of the war on terror.
  - NASA's MESSENGER spacecraft concludes its four-year orbital mission over Mercury by crashing into the planet at 3:26 p.m. EDT (1926 GMT) at 14,080 km/h (8,750 mph) at 54.4° N, 149.9° W, near the crater Janáček. NASA confirmed the unobserved impact when the Deep Space Network failed to detect a signal from the spacecraft's beacon, confirming its demise.

=== May ===
- May 1 – Baltimore state's attorney Marilyn Mosby announces that the six police officers involved in the arrest of Freddie Gray, who died during their custody, will face criminal charges ranging from assault to manslaughter to second-degree homicide.
- May 2
  - The 141st Kentucky Derby is held at the Churchill Downs racecourse in Louisville, Kentucky, with American Pharoah ridden by Victor Espinoza winning in front of a record crowd.
  - In boxing, Floyd Mayweather Jr. of the United States defeats Manny Pacquiao of the Philippines for the united welterweight championship at the MGM Grand Garden Arena on the Las Vegas Strip of Nevada by a unanimous points decision.
- May 3 – Two suspected Islamist gunmen attack the Curtis Culwell Center in the city of Garland, Texas, which was holding an exhibition of drawings of the Muslim prophet Muhammad. Both gunmen are shot dead by police. The Islamic State later claims responsibility for the attack.
- May 4 – Former CEO of Hewlett-Packard Carly Fiorina announces her run for the Republican nomination in the 2016 presidential election. Retired neurosurgeon Ben Carson also announces a run for the same nomination.
- May 5
  - Former Arkansas Governor Mike Huckabee announces his run for the Republican nomination in the 2016 presidential election.
  - The Obama administration approves the first ferry service from the United States to Cuba in decades, furthering President Obama's efforts to improve relations between the two countries.
- May 10 – An article published in the London Review of Books by Seymour Hersh alleges that the official account of the Navy SEAL raid in Abbottabad, Pakistan, that killed al-Qaeda leader Osama bin Laden is largely false, and that the Pakistani government was always aware of bin Laden's whereabouts and assisted in the raid itself. The Obama administration later calls the report "baseless".
- May 12 – An Amtrak train derails in the Philadelphia neighborhood for Port Richmond, causing cars to roll over and killing at least 8 people and injuring over 200. The train was later found to have been going nearly twice the speed limit at the time of the incident.
- May 15 – Dzhokhar Tsarnaev is sentenced to death for committing the 2013 Boston Marathon bombing.
- May 17 – A shootout erupts between rival biker gangs in a Twin Peaks restaurant in Waco, Texas, leaving nine dead.
- May 19 – The Federal Trade Commission alleges that four leading cancer charities conned donors out of $187 million over the course of four years, donating only 3% of the money to actual cancer research.
- May 20 – David Letterman broadcasts the last episode of his 22-year run as host of The Late Show on CBS, drawing a record audience. He is succeeded as Late Show host by Stephen Colbert.
- May 22
  - The State Department begins publishing the e-mails of Hillary Clinton, mostly concerning the 2012 Benghazi attack, that drew controversy earlier in the year when it was revealed that Clinton had been using a private e-mail server for work-related communications during her time as Secretary of State.
  - California state officials accept an offer from farmers in the Sacramento–San Joaquin River Delta to reduce their water use by 25% during the growing season in response to the severe drought in the area.
- May 23–25 – Historic flash flooding levels occur in Texas and Oklahoma in a prolonged outbreak of floods and tornadoes, leaving at least 17 people dead and at least 40 others missing.
- May 23 – The USA Freedom Act, which aims to end the controversial bulk collection of communication data by the National Security Agency permitted by Section 215 of the USA PATRIOT Act, fails to reach the 60 votes needed to pass in the Senate, despite passing overwhelmingly in the House.
- May 24 – In the IndyCar Series, Juan Pablo Montoya wins the 99th Indianapolis 500. This was this second victory in the race and his first in 15 years, after winning in 2000.
- May 26
  - Unidentified criminals use an online service run by the Internal Revenue Service to access the tax information of over 100,000 American taxpayers.
  - The Fifth Circuit Court of Appeals denies the Justice Department's request to go forward with President Barack Obama's immigration reform plan that would have effectively blocked the deportation of over 4 million illegal immigrants.
- May 27
  - American courts indict fourteen members of FIFA with charges of fraud, money laundering, and racketeering involving tens of millions of dollars over the course of 24 years.
  - Nebraska Governor Pete Ricketts's veto on state legislators' vote to ban the death penalty in the state is overridden, making Nebraska the first Republican-controlled state to ban the death penalty since 1973.
  - Former Pennsylvania Senator Rick Santorum announces his run for the Republican nomination in the 2016 presidential election.
- May 28 – Former New York Governor George Pataki announces his run for the Republican nomination in the 2016 presidential election.
- May 29 – Cuba is officially removed from the U.S. State Sponsors of Terrorism list.
- May 30 – Former Maryland Governor Martin O'Malley announces his run for the Democratic nomination in the 2016 presidential election.

=== June ===
- June 1 – South Carolina Senator Lindsey Graham announces his run for the Republican nomination in the 2016 presidential election.
- June 2
  - The USA Freedom Act passes the Senate after several delays and revisions since its inception and is signed into law by President Barack Obama. Though the law does restrict government surveillance under Section 215 of the Patriot Act, it does not completely end bulk collection of American phone metadata, which will now be collected by phone companies who may give information to the NSA voluntarily under the bill.
  - The director of the Transportation Security Administration is reassigned by the Department of Homeland Security after TSA officials were unsuccessful in identifying weapons in screenings 93 percent of the time during a covert test.
- June 3
  - Former Rhode Island Governor Lincoln Chafee announces his run for the Democratic nomination in the 2016 presidential election.
  - Colorado law enforcement destroy the house of an innocent bystander while trying to arrest a shoplifter.
- June 4
  - Chinese hackers are suspected in a hacking attack that results in the theft of personal data from nearly 4 million US federal government workers.
  - Former Texas Governor Rick Perry announces his run for the Republican nomination in the 2016 presidential election.
- June 5
  - Christopher Monfort is convicted of the 2009 Murder of Timothy Brenton, a Seattle police officer. Brenton had been ambushed and shot by Monfort while sitting in his police car. The perpetrator, motivated by an anti-police agenda, was also convicted of two counts of attempted murder and arson.
  - A pool party in McKinney, Texas receives attention when police officer Eric Casebolt is filmed restraining an unarmed teenage girl on the ground and pointing his weapon at other bystanders. Amid heated debate in the media, Casebolt later resigns.
- June 6
  - The 2015 Belmont Stakes is held at Belmont Park in Elmont, New York, with American Pharoah becoming the first horse in 37 years to win the Triple Crown.
  - 2015 Clinton Correctional Facility escape: Richard Matt and David Sweat, two convicted murderers, escape from Clinton Correctional Facility in Dannemora, New York, prompting an extensive manhunt. It is the first escape incident at the facility in 150 years.
- June 9 – Former Olympian and television personality Bruce Jenner, coming out as a transgender woman and now going by "Caitlyn", becomes the first transgender person to appear on the cover of Vanity Fair magazine.
- June 10 – Dee Dee Blanchard is murdered by her daughter Gypsy Rose and her daughter's boyfriend. Dee Dee had abused her daughter for many years, forcing her to use a wheelchair and to pretend to be ill.
- June 15
  - Rachel Dolezal resigns as president of the Spokane, Washington, chapter of the National Association for the Advancement of Colored People (NAACP) after allegations that she had lied about her race, claiming to be a black woman when she is actually white.
  - Former Florida Governor Jeb Bush announces his run for the Republican nomination in the 2016 presidential election.
  - In the NHL, the Western Conference champion Chicago Blackhawks defeat the Eastern Conference champion Tampa Bay Lightning in six games to win their sixth Stanley Cup championship in franchise history, and their third title in six years.
- June 16
  - Business magnate and television personality Donald Trump announces his run for the Republican nomination in the 2016 presidential election.
  - In the NBA, the Western Conference champion Golden State Warriors defeat the Eastern Conference champion Cleveland Cavaliers in six games to secure their first NBA Finals championship title in 40 years, and their fourth in franchise history.
- June 17
  - Nine people are shot and killed during a prayer service at Emanuel African Methodist Episcopal Church, a historically black church, one of them being church pastor and state senator Clementa C. Pinckney. The accused gunman, 21-year-old white supremacist Dylann Roof, is apprehended by police the next morning.
  - Treasury Secretary Jack Lew announces that beginning in 2020, an image of a woman will replace that of Alexander Hamilton on the $10 bill, with Lew expecting to choose a woman by the end of this year. Rosa Parks, Harriet Tubman, Eleanor Roosevelt, and Susan B. Anthony have all been considered frontrunners in the consideration.
- June 18 – Four months after Lester Holt was named interim weeknight anchor of NBC Nightly News in the wake of preceding anchor Brian Williams' suspension for his misrepresentation of certain events, NBC News makes the move permanent, with Holt assuming full-time weeknight duties effective June 22. Holt, who had previously anchored Nightly News' Saturday and Sunday editions from 2007 until Williams' suspension, becomes the first African-American to serve as the sole lead anchor of a weeknight network newscast.
- June 19 – Delaware Governor Jack Markell signs a bill into law that decriminalizes the possession and private recreational use of up to one ounce of marijuana. Using marijuana in a public place will now yield a $100 civil fine rather than being treated as a misdemeanor.
- June 22 – Lester Holt replaces a suspended Brian Williams as weeknight anchor of NBC Nightly News. Williams now serves as a breaking news anchor for MSNBC.
- June 23 – Defense Secretary Ashton Carter announces that the US will position tanks and heavy weapons in eastern and central Europe in response to Russia's continued military involvement in Ukraine.
- June 24
  - The House of Representatives passes a bill that gives President Barack Obama an authority to negotiate international trade agreements with Congress's approval. It is seen as a stepping stone toward the passing of Obama's proposed trade deal with eleven Asian countries known as the Trans-Pacific Partnership.
  - Louisiana Governor Bobby Jindal announces his run for the Republican nomination in the 2016 presidential election.
- June 25 – In a 6–3 decision, the Supreme Court upholds subsidies for the Patient Protection and Affordable Care Act (also known as Obamacare) nationwide, even in states that did not set up their own insurance exchanges.
- June 26
  - In a 5–4 decision, the U.S. Supreme Court rules that the Constitution guarantees a right to same-sex marriage in the United States. Justice Anthony Kennedy wrote the majority opinion, joined by Justices Ruth Bader Ginsburg, Stephen Breyer, Sonia Sotomayor and Elena Kagan.
  - Richard Matt, one of two convicted murderers who escaped from the Clinton Correctional Facility in Dannemora, New York, is fatally shot by police in Franklin County.
- June 27 – Bree Newsome is taken into custody after climbing the flagpole on the grounds of the South Carolina State House and removing its Confederate flag as an act of protest following the Charleston church shooting ten days earlier. The flag is flown again 45 minutes later.
- June 28 – Convicted murderer David Sweat is shot and apprehended by police near the Canada–US border 22 days after escaping from the Clinton Correctional Facility in New York.
- June 29
  - In a 5–4 ruling, the Supreme Court rules that the use of the chemical midazolam hydrochloride in a drug compound used in executions, which the petitioners argued did not properly sedate prisoners before execution and caused excruciating pain in three botched executions in Oklahoma the year prior, does not violate the cruel and unusual punishment statute of the Eighth Amendment of the United States Constitution.
  - In a 5–4 ruling, the Supreme Court rules that the Environmental Protection Agency's proposed regulations on toxic emissions from American power plants are unreasonable and violate the Clean Air Act.
- June 30
  - California Governor Jerry Brown signs into law a bill that requires California public or private school children to be vaccinated for various diseases to attend, regardless of their parents' religious objections.
  - President Barack Obama and Brazilian President Dilma Rousseff announce a statement, both agreeing to lower their greenhouse gas emissions and get 20% of their nations' electricity from renewable energy sources by 2030.
  - The United States Foreign Intelligence Surveillance Court approves temporarily resuming the National Security Agency's program of bulk phone metadata collection and surveillance.
  - New Jersey Governor Chris Christie announces his run for the Republican nomination in the 2016 presidential election.

=== July ===
- July 1
  - President Barack Obama announces the full re-establishment of diplomatic ties with Cuba, with the countries planning to reopen embassies in each other's capital cities.
  - The US Justice Department begins investigating "possible unlawful coordination by some airlines" in the United States to keep plane ticket prices high.
  - Oregon's decriminalization of recreational marijuana goes into effect, making it the fourth US state to legalize marijuana use.
  - Illegal immigrant Francisco Sanchez is suspected to have killed 32-year-old Kathryn Steinle in San Francisco, sparking criticism of U.S. immigration policy.
- July 2
  - BP agrees to pay the Department of Justice an $18.7 billion settlement in reparation for the 2010 BP oil spill that dumped over 125 million gallons of oil into the Gulf of Mexico. The settlement is the largest paid by a single company in US history.
  - A woman dies of measles at the University of Washington Medical Center, the first measles death in the United States since 2003.
  - Former Virginia Senator Jim Webb announces his run for the Democratic nomination in the 2016 presidential election.
- July 3 – The Swiss experimental solar-powered aircraft Solar Impulse completes its 118-hour non-stop flight from Japan, landing in Hawaii. It is the longest successful flight of a solar-powered aircraft in history.
- July 5 – The United States beats Japan 5–2 in the final game of the 2015 FIFA Women's World Cup, making it the highest scoring Women's World Cup game in history. The US is the first country to ever win three Women's World Cup titles.
- July 7 – The FBI, U.S. Postal Service, and Indiana State Police seize electronics and other items from the Zionsville, Indiana home of Subway commercial spokesman Jared Fogle.
- July 10
  - The South Carolina State House formally removes the Confederate battle flag from its grounds after weeks of protest and places it in a museum.
  - Basin and Range National Monument is established.
- July 13
  - Wisconsin Governor Scott Walker announces his run for the Republican nomination in the 2016 presidential election.
  - Sandra Bland, an African-American woman who had been arrested on July 10 following a minor traffic violation in Waller County, Texas, is found dead in her jail cell.
- July 14
  - Iran and a coalition including the United States come to an agreement on the nuclear program of Iran after numerous months of debate, agreeing to lift the United Nations Security Council's sanctions against Iran in exchange for the reduction of Iran's stockpile of enriched uranium by about 98 percent for the next 15 years.
  - The anti-abortion Center for Medical Progress releases the first of several undercover videos allegedly showing the negotiation of illegal selling of aborted fetal tissue by employees of Planned Parenthood. The videos trigger a strong months-long debate, and their validity is questioned.
  - President Barack Obama calls for a reconsideration of the use of solitary confinement in American prisons, and for voting rights for released criminals.
- July 16
  - A gunman attacks two military installations in Chattanooga, Tennessee. Five U.S. Marines are killed and two others are injured.
  - James Holmes is found guilty of perpetrating the 2012 Aurora, Colorado shooting. Holmes tried to plea not guilty by reason of insanity.
- July 17–21 – The Cajon Pass wildfire spreads across 4,250 acres (1,720 ha) in the Mojave Desert near the towns of Victorville and Hesperia, north of San Bernardino and south of Bakersfield in the state of California, destroying seven homes (one damaged), 16 out buildings (four damaged), and 74 vehicles and also injuring three people.
- July 20 – After 54 years, the United States reopens its embassy in Havana, Cuba, and Cuba reopens its embassy in Washington, D.C.
- July 21
  - Authorities in Waller County, Texas announce that the death of activist Sandra Bland in police custody will be treated as a murder investigation.
  - Hackers claim to have stolen and released 2,500 customers' information from extramarital affair dating website Ashley Madison.
  - Ohio Governor John Kasich becomes the 16th person to seek the nomination of the Republican Party.
  - The National Hockey League announces that it has received formal applications for expansion teams from ownership groups in Las Vegas and Quebec City. If granted, the expansion teams would begin play in the 2017–18 season.
- July 22 – Sharknado 3: Oh Hell No! airs for the first time on Syfy.
- July 23 – A gunman opens fire at a movie theater in Lafayette, Louisiana, killing two people and injuring nine others before committing suicide.
- July 24 – The United States Department of Transportation opens an investigation into whether airlines engaged in price gouging by raising ticket prices in the Northeastern United States following the 2015 Philadelphia train derailment in May.
- July 25 – The 2015 Special Olympics World Summer Games open at the Los Angeles Memorial Coliseum in Los Angeles, California.
- July 26
  - Verizon employees in nine states (Connecticut, Delaware, Maryland, Massachusetts, New Jersey, New York, Pennsylvania, Rhode Island, Virginia) and Washington, D.C. vote to go on strike on August 1 if disputes between the union and the company result in no new contracts.
  - Nike agrees to pay a combined $2.4 million to consumers of Nike+ FuelBand over false advertising.

=== August ===
- August 3
  - In a unanimous decision, the jury ruled that James Eagan Holmes, convicted for the 2012 movie theatre shooting in Aurora, Colorado, is still eligible for the death penalty.
  - US President Barack Obama announces the Clean Power Plan which includes the first-ever Environmental Protection Agency standards on carbon pollution from U.S. power plants.
- August 4 – A street-corner sized sinkhole forms at the intersection of Fifth Avenue and 64th Street in Sunset Park in Brooklyn, New York City, around 7:30 am, destroying the street corner. The northbound N Broadway Local train is delayed; there is at least one disconnected pipe and gas lines are being repaired by National Grid workers, and the police have cordoned off the area. No fatalities or injuries have been reported.
- August 6 – The American news satire program The Daily Show airs its last broadcast with comedian Jon Stewart as host.
- August 7 – The jury in the penalty phase of the trial of Aurora shooter James Holmes reaches a verdict to sentence him to a life in prison without parole for killing 12 and injuring 70 during the attack at Century 16 Theatres in Aurora, Colorado, on July 20, 2012. after they reject the death penalty.
- August 12
  - Former President Jimmy Carter reveals that he is being treated for brain cancer.
  - DNA testing confirms former President Warren Harding to be the biological father of Elizabeth Ann Blaesing, who he raised with his mistress Nan Britton.
- August 19
  - The U.S. Food and Drug Administration approves the drug flibanserin, sometimes called the "pink pill" or the "female Viagra", designed to boost women's sexual desire.
  - Jared Fogle, popular spokesman and advertising figure for the American fast food restaurant chain Subway, agrees to plead guilty to charges of paying to have sex with minors and possession of child pornography.
- August 20 – After an axe attack on cinema-goers in Tennessee earlier in the month, American movie theater chain Regal Entertainment Group announces that it will now perform security bag checks at all its theater venues.
- August 22 – Extramarital affair dating website Ashley Madison is faced with a $578 million class action lawsuit by two Canadian law firms after the breach of thousands of customers' personal data in July.
- August 26 – News reporter Alison Parker and camera operator Adam Ward are shot and killed on live television during an interview in Moneta, Virginia. The shooter, Vester Lee Flanagan (a former colleague of Parker and Ward at station WDBJ in Roanoke), commits suicide several hours later.
- August 27
  - Officials report that, in the month of July, California residents reduced their water use by 31.3%, exceeding the 25% mandate put in place by Governor Jerry Brown in response to the ongoing drought in the state.
  - McDonald's Corporation and Tyson Foods sever ties with a Tennessee-based farm after an exposé video released by Mercy for Animals depicts farmers stabbing, brutalizing, and stomping on chickens before sending them to companies for consumption.
- August 28 – Ashley Madison CEO Noel Biderman resigns from his position in response to the growing information coming out of the site's hacking incident a month earlier.
- August 30 – At the MTV Video Music Awards, Kanye West announces he's running for president in 2020.
- August 31 – The University of Texas–Rio Grande Valley is founded in Brownsville, Texas.

=== September ===
- September 1
  - A widespread manhunt begins in northern Illinois after three suspects shoot and kill a veteran Fox Lake police officer.
  - In a federal court settlement, the state of California agrees to reform its use of solitary confinement in prisons.
  - Colin Kaepernick takes the knee during the national anthem for the first time.
  - The United States Olympic Committee chooses Los Angeles, California, as its selection for the American bid for host city of the 2024 Olympic Games.
- September 3 – Kim Davis, a clerk for Rowan County, Kentucky, is found in contempt of court by federal judge David Bunning and jailed for five days for refusing to issue marriage licenses to same-sex couples on religious grounds, defying the Supreme Court case legalizing same-sex marriage.
- September 6 – Harvard Law School professor Lawrence Lessig announces his run for the Democratic nomination in the 2016 presidential election.
- September 8 – Stephen Colbert begins his run as the successor to David Letterman as host of The Late Show on CBS.
- September 10 – Senate Democrats block a Republican resolution to reject the Joint Comprehensive Plan of Action put forward by President Barack Obama regarding the nuclear program of Iran.
- September 11 – Former Governor of Texas Rick Perry drops out of the race for the Republican nomination in the 2016 presidential election.
- September 13 – The Valley wildfire claims at least three lives in Lake County, California, with thousands of people forced to evacuate.
- September 14
  - Geography professor Shannon Lamb shoots and kills history professor Ethan Schmidt at Delta State University in Cleveland, Mississippi, before committing suicide.
  - 2015 Utah floods: Widespread flooding in southern Utah claims at least 20 lives.
- September 16 – After sharp criticism and accusations of racial profiling, police in Irving, Texas, drop charges on 14-year-old Ahmed Mohamed, who was suspended from MacArthur High School after authorities believed a reassembled digital clock he brought to school was a makeshift bomb. President Barack Obama also extends an invitation to Mohamed to the White House.
- September 18 – German car manufacturing company Volkswagen is directed by the Obama administration to recall about 500,000 vehicles in the United States after the company is accused of installing software in its diesel-powered cars that allow emissions of 40 times as much polluting exhaust pipe gas as is allowed by the Clean Air Act.
- September 20 – The 67th Primetime Emmy Awards are held at the Microsoft Theater in Los Angeles, California.
  - Game of Thrones wins the award for Outstanding Drama Series.
  - Veep wins the award for Outstanding Comedy Series.
  - Viola Davis becomes the first African-American woman to win the award for Outstanding Lead Actress in a Drama Series.
- September 21 – Wisconsin Governor Scott Walker drops out of the presidential race.
- September 22–27 – Pope Francis visits Washington, D.C., New York City, and Philadelphia, where he spoke to a joint session of the United States Congress, addressed the United Nations, attended the World Meeting of Families, and held several masses.
- September 22 – County clerk Kim Davis once again faces legal action after four couples ask a judge to order Davis to reissue their marriage licenses after she removed her name from them.
- September 25 – Speaker of the House John Boehner announces that he will resign from his position, effective October 30.
- September 28 – NASA announces that there is strong evidence that liquid water flows on Mars during the summer months, increasing the chance of sustainable life on the planet.

=== October ===
- October – The unemployment rate drops to 5%, the lowest since April 2008 and the same as when the Great Recession started in December 2007.
- October 1
  - 26-year-old Christopher Harper-Mercer opens fire at Umpqua Community College in Roseburg, Oregon, killing nine people and injuring eight others. It is the largest shooting at a college since the Virginia Tech shooting in 2007.
  - The SS El Faro, a cargo ship, sinks off the Bahamas after leaving Jacksonville, Florida, two days prior, headed to Puerto Rico. It is the worst cargo shipping disaster involving a U.S.-flagged vessel in more than three decades.
- October 3 – The United States Air Force bombs a Doctors Without Borders hospital in Kunduz, Afghanistan, by request of local Afghan forces. The bombing may be in violation of international humanitarian law.
- October 9
  - The Obama administration decides to cease American training of Syrian rebels in the war against the Islamic State.
  - WikiLeaks releases a controversial portion of the text of the Trans-Pacific Partnership, a multinational trade agreement in negotiation that is backed by President Obama, that covers policy related to intellectual property rights.
  - The California Coastal Commission bans the captive breeding of killer whales at the San Diego facility of SeaWorld.
- October 13 – The first debate for the Democratic Party before the 2016 primaries is held in Las Vegas, Nevada, and broadcast on CNN.
- October 15 – President Barack Obama announces that the United States will extend its military presence in Afghanistan until the end of 2017.
- October 20 – Former Virginia Senator Jim Webb drops out of the presidential race.
- October 21 – Vice President Biden announces he will not run for President.
- October 22 – Hillary Clinton testifies for a second time before the Benghazi Committee and answered members' questions for more than eight hours in a public hearing.
- October 23 – Former Governor of Rhode Island Lincoln Chafee drops out of the presidential race.
- October 24 – Floyd Ray Cook shoots a police officer in Putnam County, Tennessee and absconds, sparking the Floyd Ray Cook shootings and manhunt.
- October 25 – A drunk driver plows into the Oklahoma State Homecoming parade in Stillwater, Oklahoma, killing four people and injuring 34.
- October 26
  - A video surfaces online of a student being violently pulled from her chair in a classroom by a police officer at Spring Valley High School in South Carolina, prompting public outcry and an investigation.
  - The World Health Organization releases a finding that processed meat such as sausage and ham can cause cancer.
- October 27 – The United States Senate votes overwhelmingly in favor of the controversial Cybersecurity Information Sharing Act, which would grant companies immunity from lawsuits for sharing personal data with the government for surveillance. The bill has several noted critics, including the American Civil Liberties Union and Edward Snowden.
- October 28 – A military JLENS blimp from the United States Army breaks loose from its moorings at the Aberdeen Proving Ground in Maryland, and drifts over 16,000 ft above Pennsylvania. F-16 Fighter jets were scrambled to track the blimp that has since deflated, causing widespread power outages from a long cable it dragged along the ground.
- October 29 – Representative Paul Ryan takes over for John Boehner as Speaker of the House of Representatives after being elected following Boehner's resignation.
- October 30
  - President Barack Obama orders up to fifty US special operations ground troops to be deployed in Syria to fight Islamic State militants.
  - Under new rules from the United States Sentencing Commission, nonviolent drug offenders with reduced jail sentences begin to be released from prison, with the first of many waves totaling nearly 6,000 people, about 1,700 of which are illegal immigrants and may face deportation.

=== November ===
- November 1 – In Major League Baseball, the Kansas City Royals defeat the New York Mets in the 2015 World Series 4 games to 1 to win their first championship title in 30 years.
- November 2 – Harvard Law School professor Lawrence Lessig drops out of the 2016 presidential election.
- November 5 – Newspapers report that oil companies knew that burning oil and gas could cause global warming since the 1970s but, nonetheless, funded deniers for years.
- November 9 – Amid increasing racial tension at the school, Tim Wolfe, president of the University of Missouri System, resigns from his position after a football team strike and a University of Missouri student's hunger strike.
- November 11 – A suspect is arrested by University of Missouri police for making racially charged violent threats on social media as the university protests continue to gain media attention.
- November 12 – NASA scientists report that human-made carbon dioxide (CO_{2}) continues to increase above levels not seen in hundreds of thousands of years: currently, about half of the carbon dioxide released from the burning of fossil fuels remains in the atmosphere and is not absorbed by vegetation and the oceans.
- November 13 – The US Department of Defense announces their belief that an American airstrike in Syria killed Mohammed Emwazi, better known as Jihadi John, who is responsible for numerous recorded beheadings of several hostages of the Islamic State, including American citizens.
- November 17 – Louisiana Governor Bobby Jindal withdraws from the 2016 presidential election.
- November 22 – The 2015 New Orleans shooting took place at Bunny Friend playground in the Ninth Ward of New Orleans, Louisiana. In conjunction with the music video recorded at an impromptu unauthorized block party, 17 people were injured, with Joseph "Moe" Allen identified as a suspect.
- November 27 – A gunman opens fire at a Planned Parenthood clinic in Colorado Springs, Colorado, killing 3, including a police officer, and injuring 9. After a 5-hour standoff, shooter Robert Lewis Dear surrenders to police.

=== December ===
- December 2
  - 2015 San Bernardino attack: 14 people are killed in a terrorist attack at a facility for the mentally disabled in San Bernardino, California. It is the deadliest mass shooting in the United States in 2015, and the deadliest since 2012.
  - An E. coli outbreak involving over one dozen states and 150 000 products took place.
- December 3
  - 2015 NFL season: In American football, Green Bay Packers quarterback Aaron Rodgers throws a 61-yard Hail Mary pass to tight end Richard Rodgers to give the team a 27–23 victory against the Detroit Lions and advance to 8–4. The pass is the longest game-winning Hail Mary play in National Football League history.
  - Defense Secretary Ashton Carter announces that all combat roles in the United States military must be opened to women by April 1, 2016.
- December 7 – Donald Trump calls for a complete ban on Muslims entering the United States, following the events in San Bernardino and Paris, causing nationwide controversy.
- December 9 – Pharmaceutical executive Martin Shkreli is revealed to be the winner of the auction of the single copy of the Wu-Tang Clan album Once Upon a Time in Shaolin, valued at $2 million.
- December 15
  - 2015 Los Angeles Unified School District closure: The Los Angeles Unified School District received a credible terrorism threat causing the temporary closure of all Los Angeles Unified Schools.
- December 17 – Martin Shkreli is arrested on securities fraud charges for running a Ponzi-like scheme.
- December 18 – Star Wars: The Force Awakens releases in the United States, the seventh film in the mainline Star Wars film series. Grossing over $2 billion worldwide, the film broke box office records and would go on to become the highest-grossing film in the U.S. and the high-grossing of the year.
- December 21 – South Carolina Senator Lindsey Graham drops out of the 2016 presidential election.
- December 29 – Former New York Governor George Pataki drops out of the 2016 presidential election.
- December 30 – An arrest warrant issued for comedian Bill Cosby for the alleged drugging and sexual assault of an employee at Temple University in 2004, following over a year of dozens of similar allegations. Cosby remains free on $1 million bail until his trial begins.

== Elections ==
=== April ===
- April 7 – Chicago mayoral election: Incumbent Rahm Emanuel wins a second term after facing off against Jesús "Chuy" García in the city's first-ever runoff election.

=== November ===
- 2015 United States elections were held on November 3. By-elections to the United States Congress will appear.
- 2015 United States gubernatorial elections occurred on November 3. Kentucky, Louisiana, and Mississippi had gubernatorial elections.
- 2015 Indianapolis mayoral election took place on November 3. Joe Hogsett was elected.
- 2015 Philadelphia mayoral election took place on November 3. Jim Kenney was elected.

== Deaths ==
=== January ===
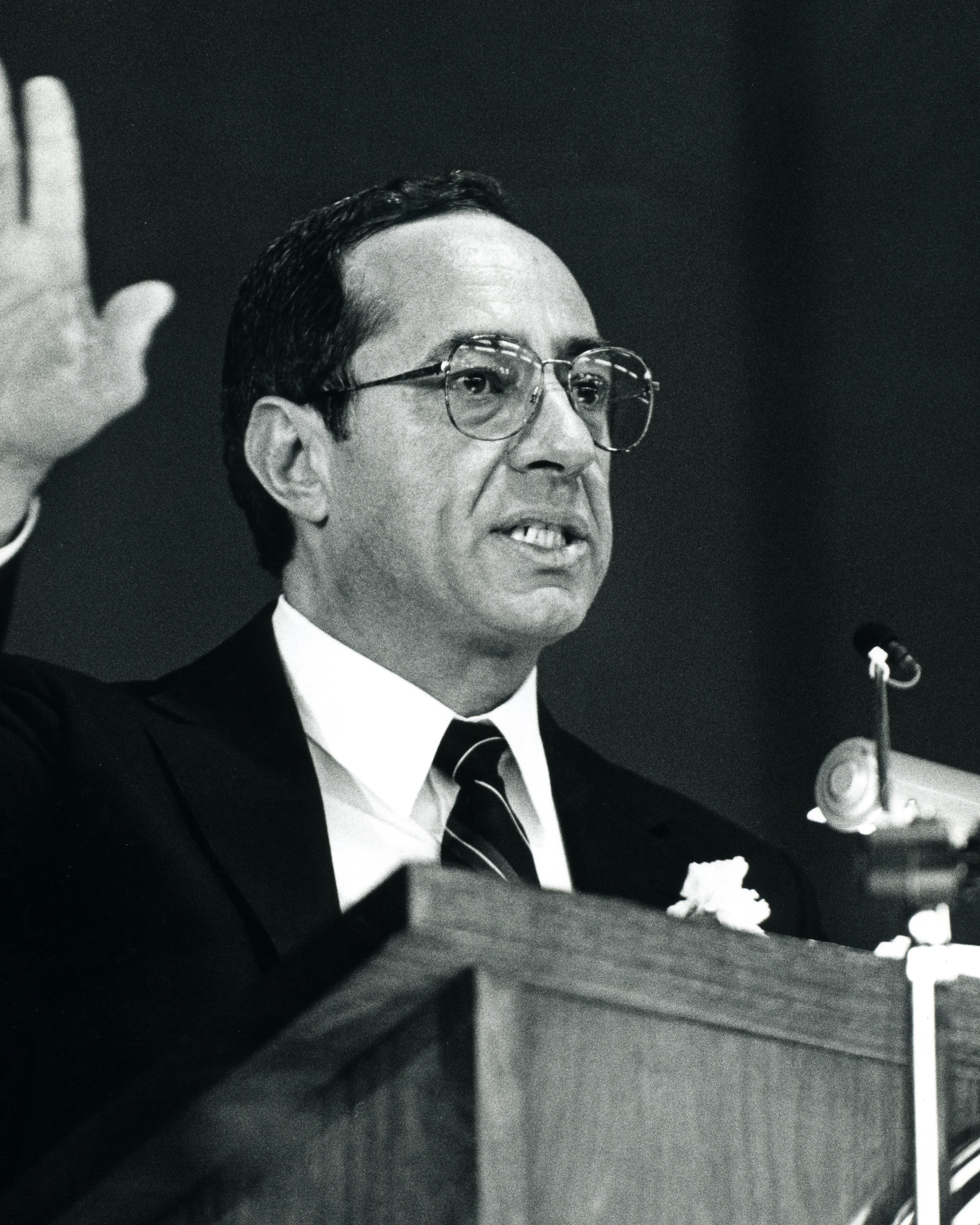
Mario Cuomo

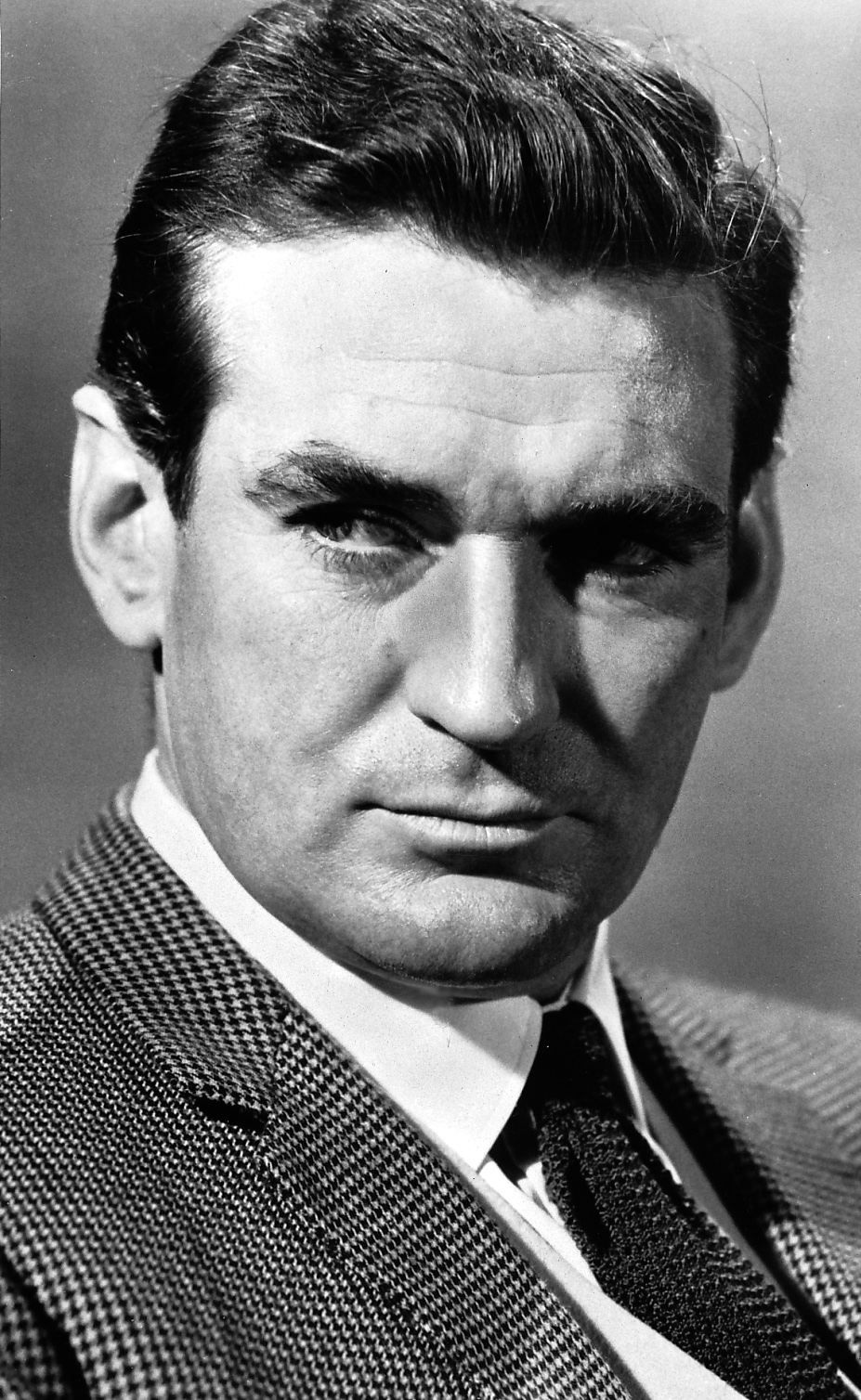
Rod Taylor

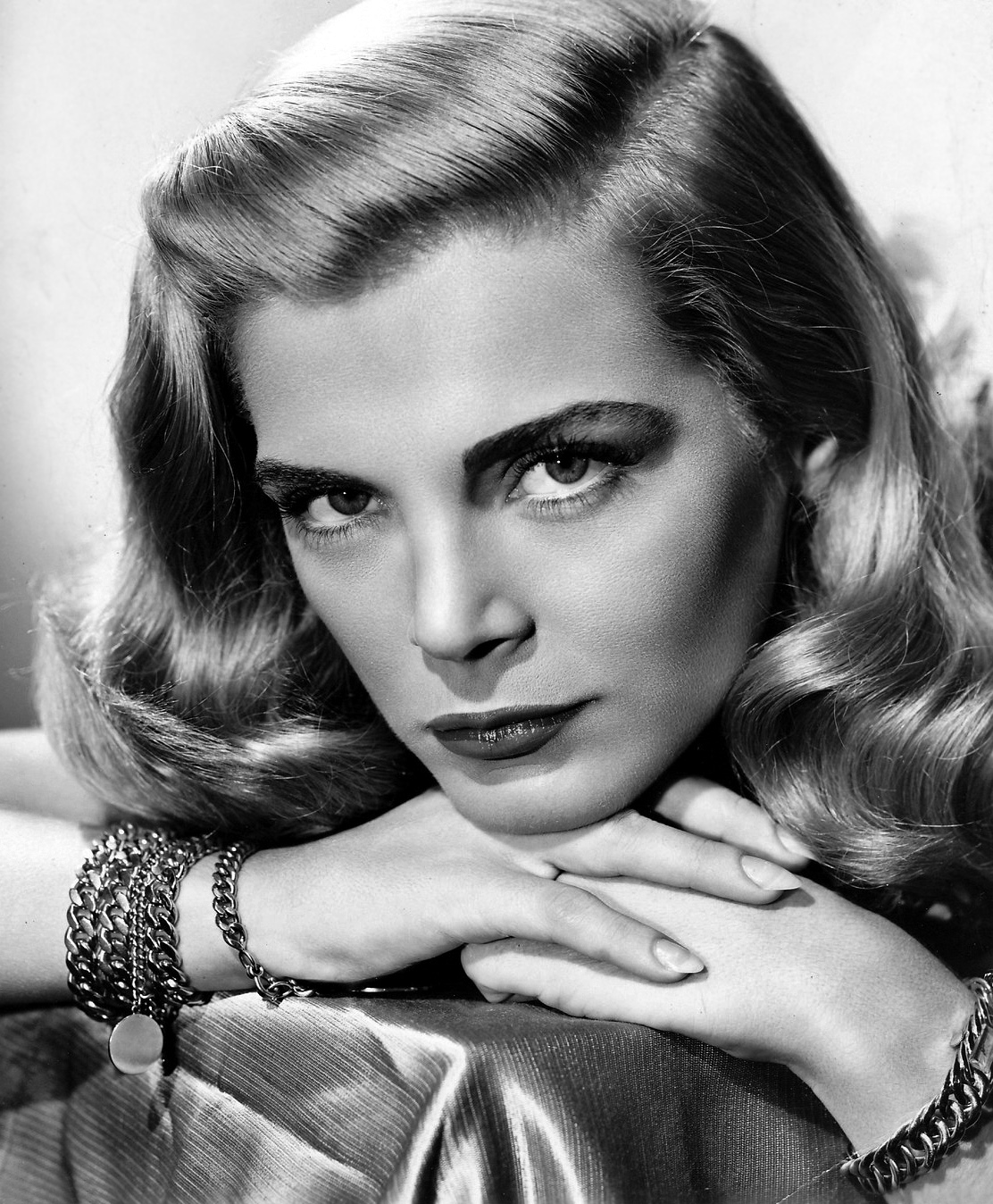
Lizabeth Scott

- January 1
  - Mario Cuomo, 52nd Governor of New York and father of Andrew Cuomo (b. 1932)
  - Donna Douglas, actress (b. 1932)
  - Jeff Golub, guitarist (b. 1955)
  - Miller Williams, poet (b. 1930)
- January 2
  - Little Jimmy Dickens, singer (b. 1920)
  - Arthur A. Neu, 40th Lieutenant Governor of Iowa (b. 1933)
- January 3
  - Edward Brooke, United States Senator from Massachusetts (b. 1919)
  - Bryan Caldwell, American football player (b. 1960)
  - Maher Hathout, Egyptian-born American Islamic leader (b. 1936)
  - Allie Sherman, American football player and coach (b. 1923)
- January 4
  - Stu Miller, baseball player (b. 1927)
  - Hank Peters, baseball executive (b. 1924)
  - Stuart Scott, sports broadcaster (b. 1965)
- January 5
  - Arthur E. Chase, businessman and politician (b. 1930)
  - Bernard Joseph McLaughlin, Roman Catholic prelate (b. 1912)
- January 7
  - Tim Arson, professional wrestler (b.1976)
  - Rod Taylor, Australian-American actor (b. 1930)
- January 8 – Andraé Crouch, musician and pastor (b. 1942)
- January 9
  - Samuel Goldwyn Jr., film producer (b. 1926)
  - Robert V. Keeley, Lebanese-American soldier and diplomat, United States Ambassador to Greece (b. 1929)
  - Bud Paxson, broadcaster and businessman, founded the Home Shopping Network and Pax TV (b. 1935)
  - Roy Tarpley, basketball player (b. 1964)
- January 10
  - George Dickerson, actor, writer, and poet (b. 1933)
  - Harry V. Jaffa, historian, philosopher, and academic (b. 1918)
  - Taylor Negron, actor, comedian, painter, and playwright (b. 1957)
- January 12 – A. J. Masters, country musician (b. 1950)
- January 14 – Darren Shahlavi, English actor and stuntman (b. 1972)
- January 17 – Gregg Plitt, fitness model and actor (b. 1977)
- January 18
  - Cynthia Layne, singer-songwriter (b. 1963)
  - Dallas Taylor, drummer (b. 1948)
- January 19
  - Ward Swingle, singer-songwriter and conductor (Les Double Six) (b. 1927)
  - Reies Tijerina, pastor and activist (b. 1926)
- January 21
  - Marcus Borg, scholar, theologian, and author (b. 1942)
  - Vince Camuto, fashion designer and businessman, co-founded Nine West (b. 1936)
- January 22 – Wendell H. Ford, 53rd Governor of Kentucky (b. 1924)
- January 23
  - Ernie Banks, baseball player (b. 1931)
  - Nick Koback, baseball player and golfer (b. 1935)
- January 24 – Joe Franklin, radio and television host (b. 1926)
- January 27 – Charles Hard Townes, Nobel physicist (b. 1915)
- January 29 – Rod McKeun, poet, singer-songwriter (b. 1933)
- January 30 – Carl Djerassi, American chemist (b. 1923)
- January 31 – Lizabeth Scott, actress (b. 1922)

=== February ===
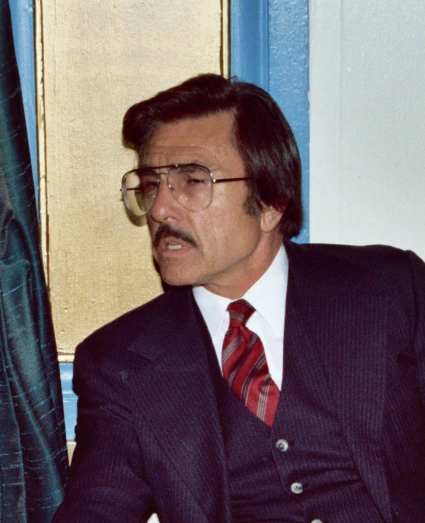
Gary Owens

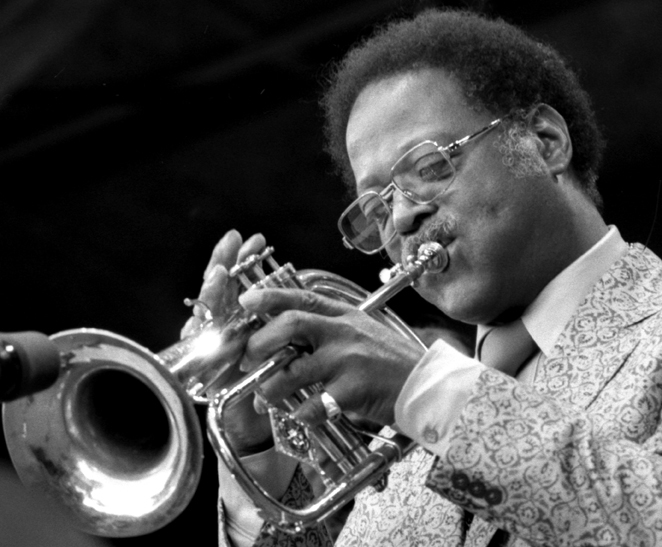
Clark Terry

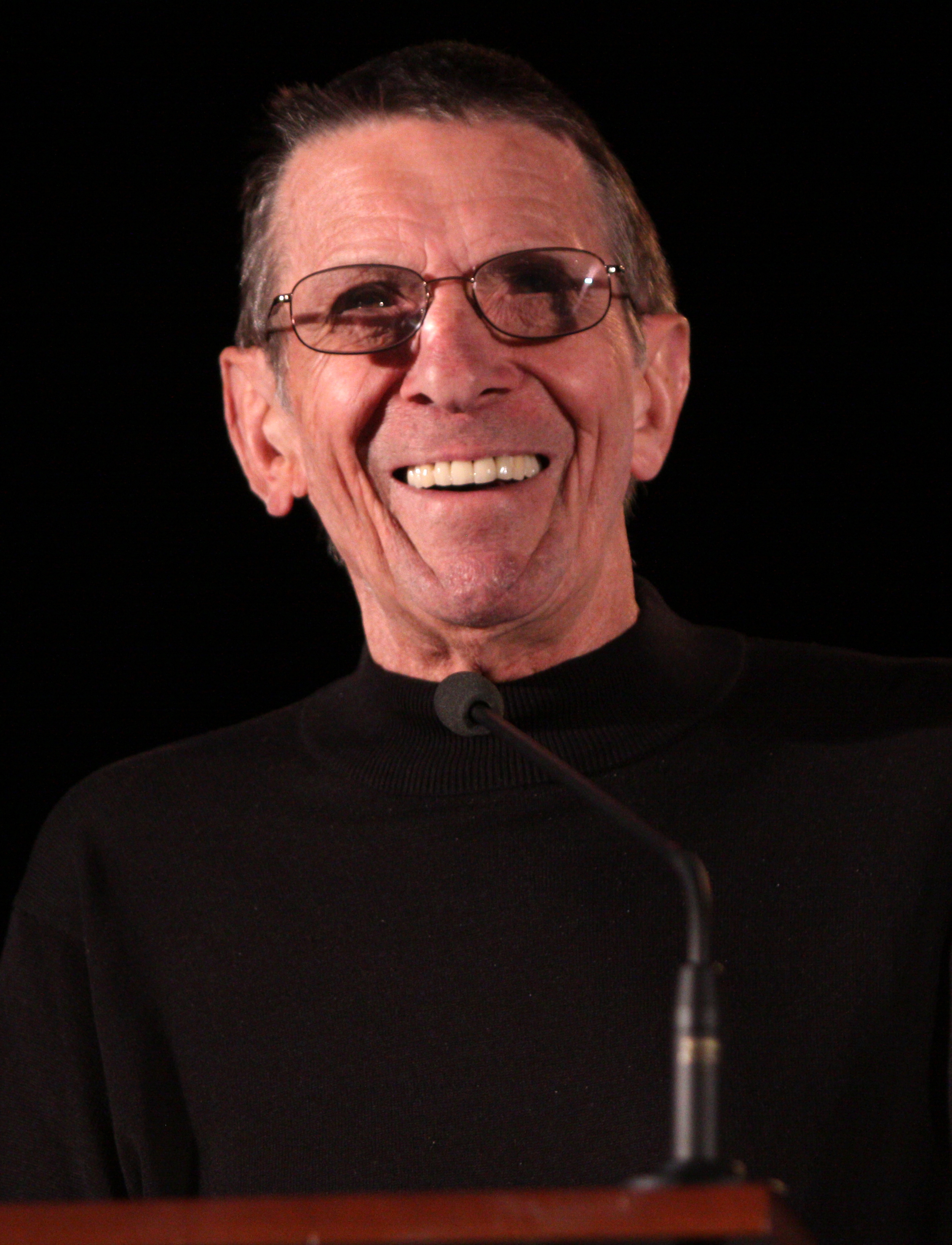
Leonard Nimoy

- February 1 – Monty Oum, animator (b. 1981)
- February 2
  - Joseph Alfidi, American pianist, composer, and conductor (b. 1949)
  - The Jacka, American rapper (b. 1977)
- February 3 – Charlie Sifford, golfer and first African American to play on the PGA Tour (b. 1922)
- February 5 – Val Logsdon Fitch, Nobel physicist (b. 1923)
- February 7
  - Billy Casper, golfer (b. 1931)
  - Marshall Rosenberg, psychologist and author (b. 1934)
  - Dean Smith, basketball player and coach (b. 1931)
  - John C. Whitehead, banker and politician, 9th United States Deputy Secretary of State (b. 1922)
- February 9 – Ed Sabol, American football filmmaker (b. 1916)
- February 10
  - Bill Enyart, American football player (b. 1947)
  - Dane A. Miller, businessman (b. 1946)
- February 11
  - Bob Simon, journalist and television news correspondent (b. 1941)
  - Jerry Tarkanian, basketball coach (b. 1930)
- February 12
  - David Carr, writer (b. 1956)
  - Movita Castaneda, actress and wife of Marlon Brando (b. 1916)
  - Gary Owens, disc jockey, actor, and announcer (b. 1936)
- February 14
  - Louis Jourdan, French-born actor and singer, died in Beverly Hills, California (b. 1921)
  - Philip Levine, poet (b. 1928)
- February 15 – Arnaud de Borchgrave, Belgian-born American journalist and executive (b. 1925)
- February 16
  - Lesley Gore, singer, songwriter, and activist (b.1946)
  - Lorena Rojas, Mexican actress and singer (b. 1971)
- February 17 – June Fairchild, actress and dancer (b. 1946)
- February 18
  - Cass Ballenger, lawyer and politician (b. 1926)
  - Dave Cloud, American singer-songwriter and actor (b. 1956)
  - Jerome Kersey, American basketball player (b. 1962)
- February 19 – Harris Wittels, actor, comedian, writer, and producer (b. 1984)
- February 21
  - Robert O. Marshall, convicted murderer (b. 1939)
  - Bruce Sinofsky, documentary filmmaker (b. 1956)
  - Clark Terry, musician and composer (b. 1920)
- February 24
  - Irving Kahn, businessman and investor (b. 1905)
  - Donald Keough, business executive (b. 1926)
- February 23 – Ben Woolf, actor (b. 1980)
- February 25 – Eugenie Clark, zoologist (b. 1922)
- February 26 – Earl Lloyd, American basketball player and first African American in the NBA (b. 1928)
- February 27
  - Rod McKuen, actor (b. 1931)
  - Leonard Nimoy, actor and director (b. 1931)
- February 28
  - Alex Johnson, American baseball player (b. 1942)
  - Ezra Laderman, composer (b. 1924)
  - Anthony Mason, basketball player (b. 1966)
  - Maxee, American singer-songwriter (born 1969)
  - Thomas J. Stanley, writer and academic (b. 1944)

=== March ===
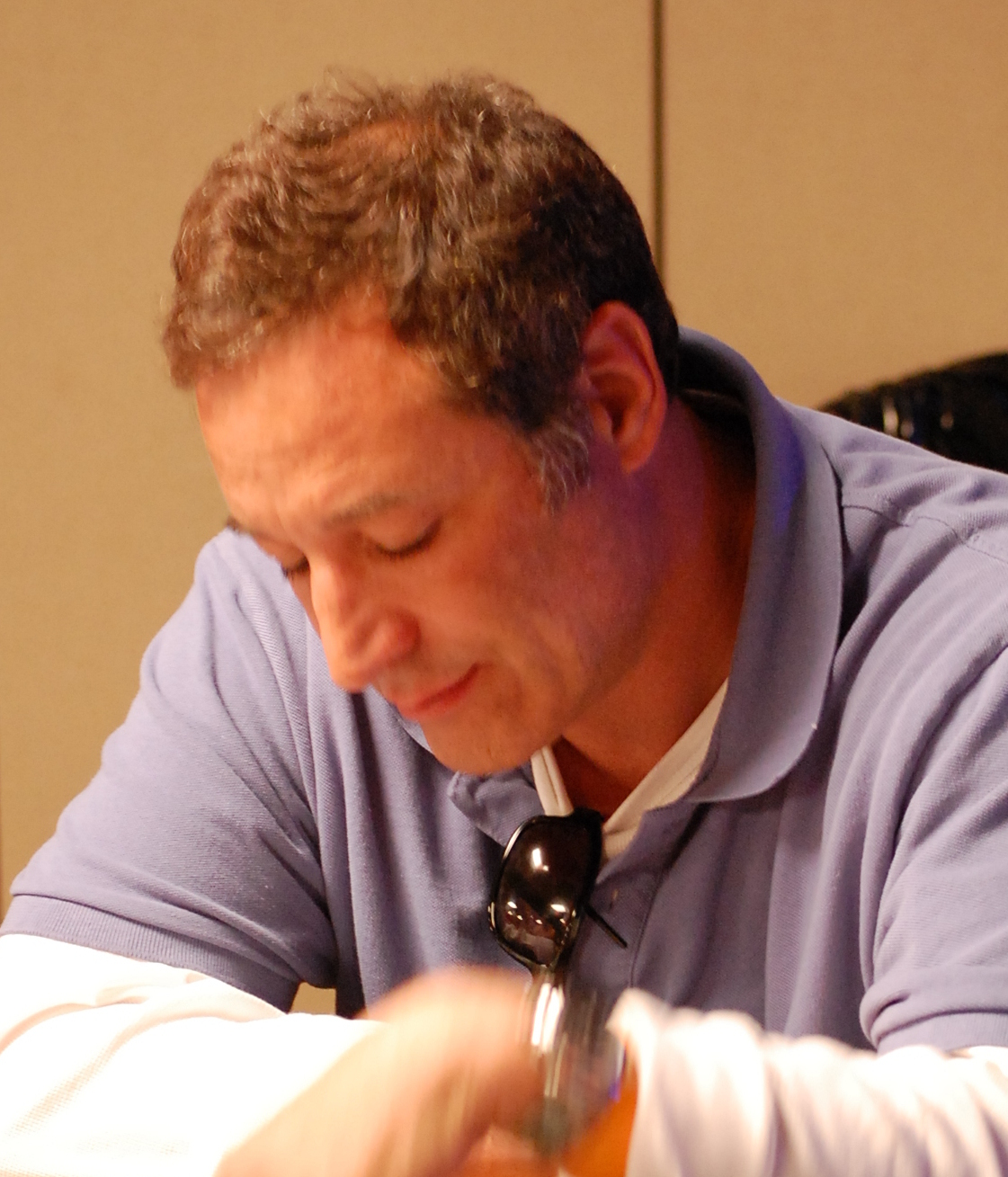
Sam Simon

- March 1
  - Joshua Fishman, linguist (b. 1926)
  - Orrin Keepnews, writer and record producer (b. 1923)
  - Minnie Miñoso, Cuban-born American baseball player (b. 1922)
  - Daniel von Bargen, actor (b. 1950)
- March 2
  - Dean Hess, minister and U.S. Air Force officer (b. 1917)
  - Jenna McMahon, television actress, writer, and producer (b. 1925)
- March 4 – Harve Bennett, television and film producer and screenwriter (b. 1930)
- March 5
  - Edward Egan, Roman Catholic prelate (b. 1932)
  - Albert Maysles, documentary filmmaker and brother of David Maysles (b. 1926)
- March 7
  - F. Ray Keyser Jr., 72nd Governor of Vermont (b. 1927)
  - Lew Soloff, musician and composer (b. 1944)
- March 8 – Sam Simon, television producer, director, and screenwriter and husband of Jennifer Tilly (b. 1955)
- March 9 – Windell Middlebrooks, actor (b. 1979)
- March 10
  - Claude Sitton, newspaper reporter and editor (b. 1925)
- March 11 – Jimmy Greenspoon, musician and composer (b. 1948)
- March 12 – Michael Graves, architect (b. 1934)
- March 13
  - Irwin Hasen, cartoonist (b. 1918)
  - Al Rosen, American baseball player and executive (b. 1924)
- March 15
  - Sally Forrest, actress (b. 1928)
  - Mike Porcaro, guitarist (b. 1955)
- March 16
  - Bruce Crump, drummer (b. 1957)
  - Andy Fraser, British musician and songwriter (b. 1952)
  - Jack Haley, basketball player and sportscaster (b. 1964)
- March 18 – Lyle E. Schaller, church consultant and writer (b. 1923)
- March 20
  - Robert Kastenmeier, lawyer, and politician (b. 1924)
  - A. J. Pero, drummer (b. 1959)
  - Gregory Walcott, actor (b. 1928)
- March 21 – Chuck Bednarik, American football player (b. 1925)
- March 22 – Tom Koch, comedy writer (b. 1925)
- March 23 – Gary Dahl, businessman, creator of the Pet Rock (b. 1936)
- March 27
  - Rod Hundley, American basketball player and broadcaster (b. 1934)
  - Janet L. Norwood, statistician (b. 1923)
- March 28
  - Richard L. Bare, film and television director, producer and screenwriter (b. 1913)
  - Gene Saks, stage and film director and actor and husband of Bea Arthur (b. 1921)
- March 30 – Robert Z'Dar, actor and victim of rare congenital deformity (b. 1950)

=== April ===
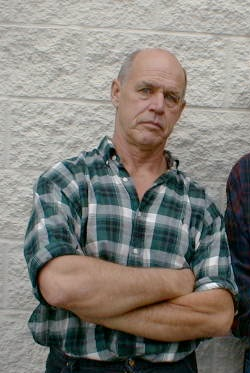
Geoffrey Lewis

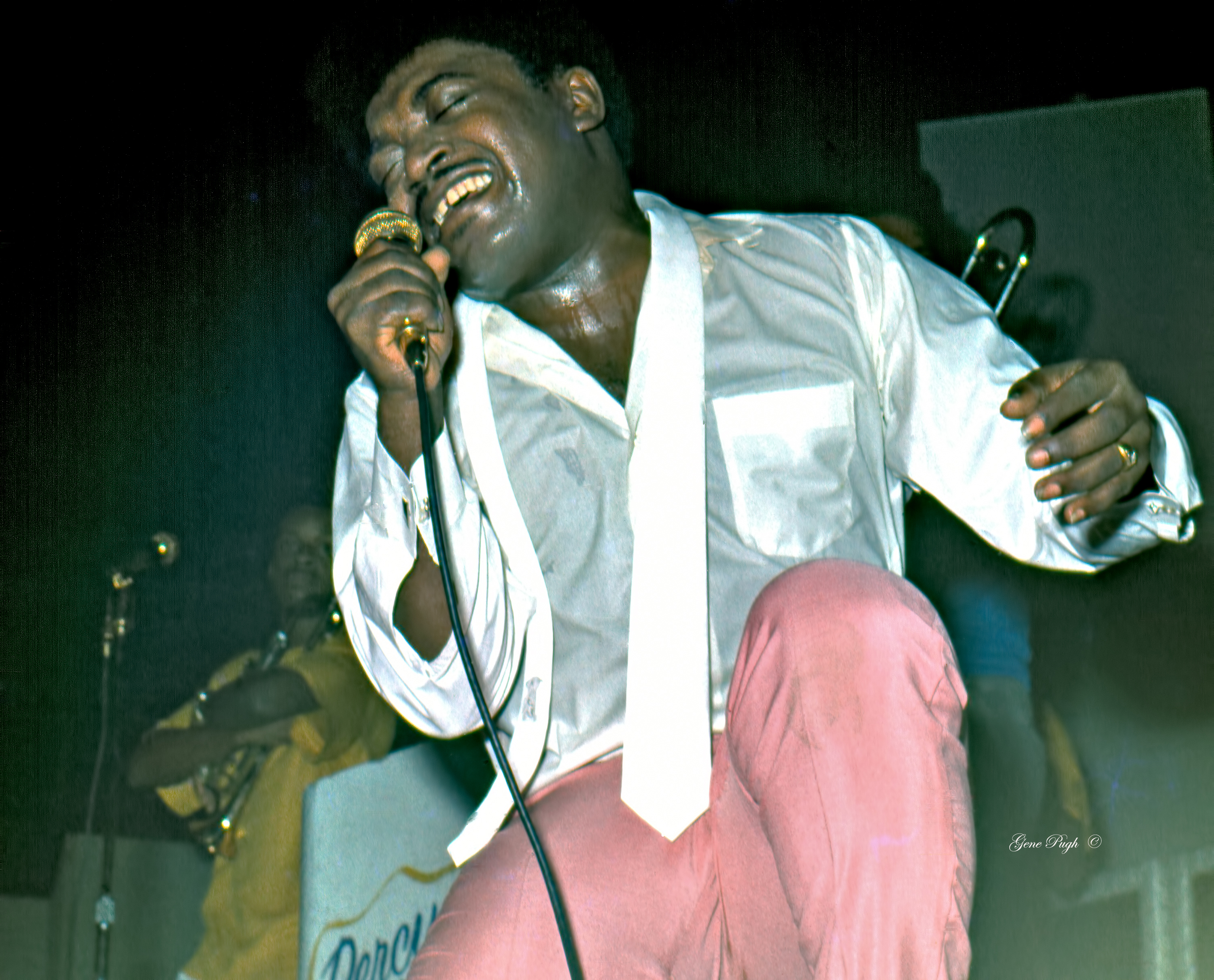
Percy Sledge

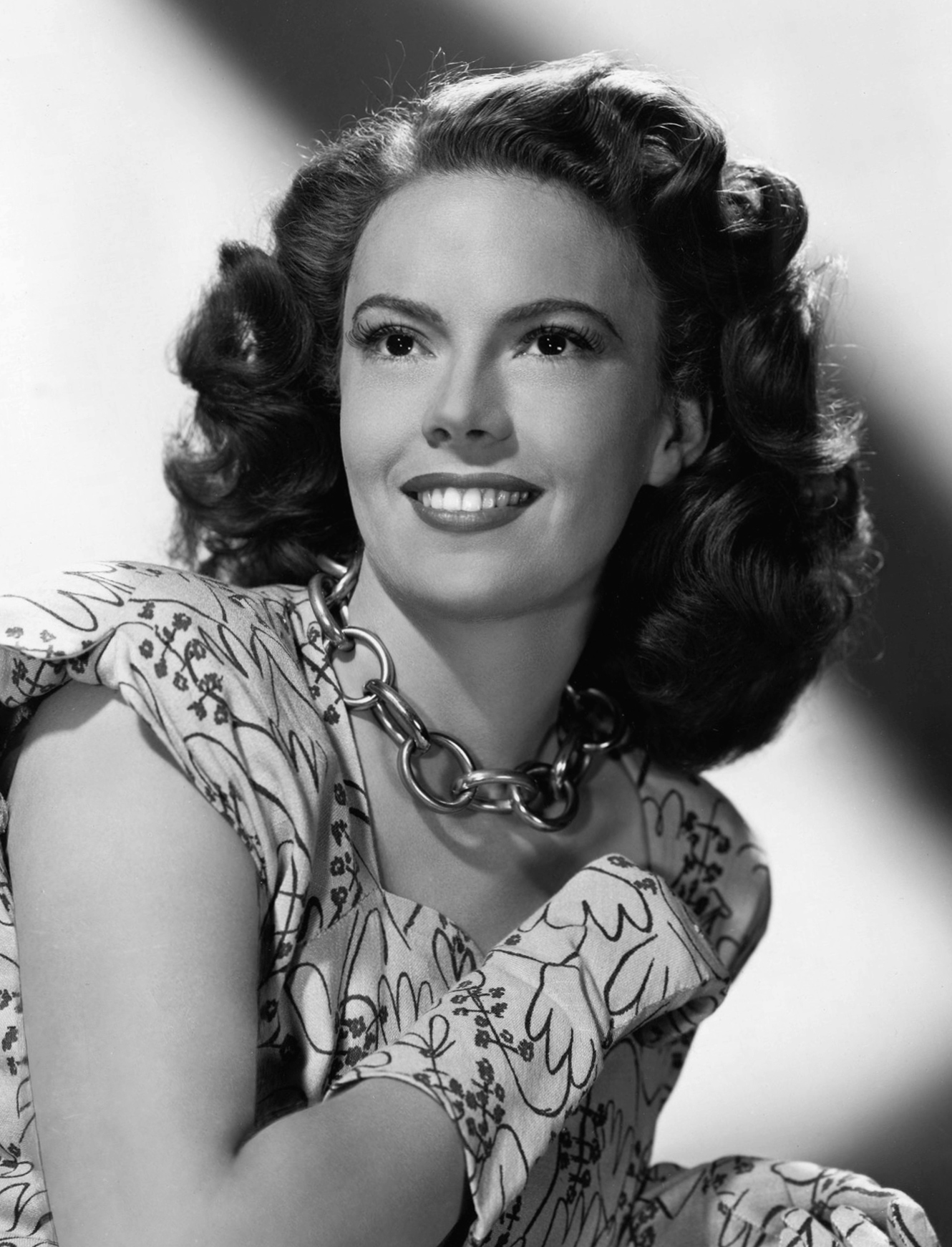
Jayne Meadows

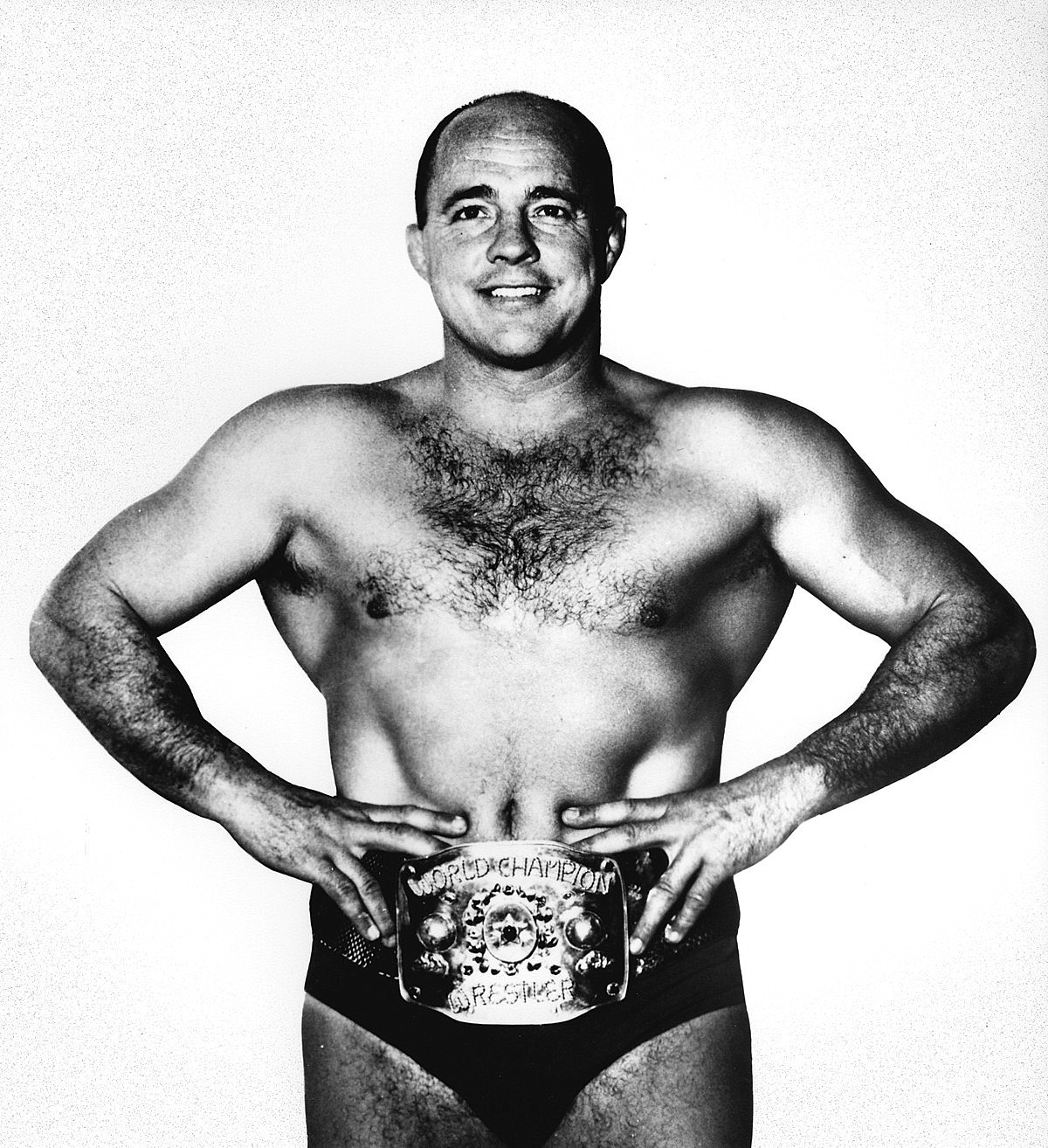
Verne Gagne

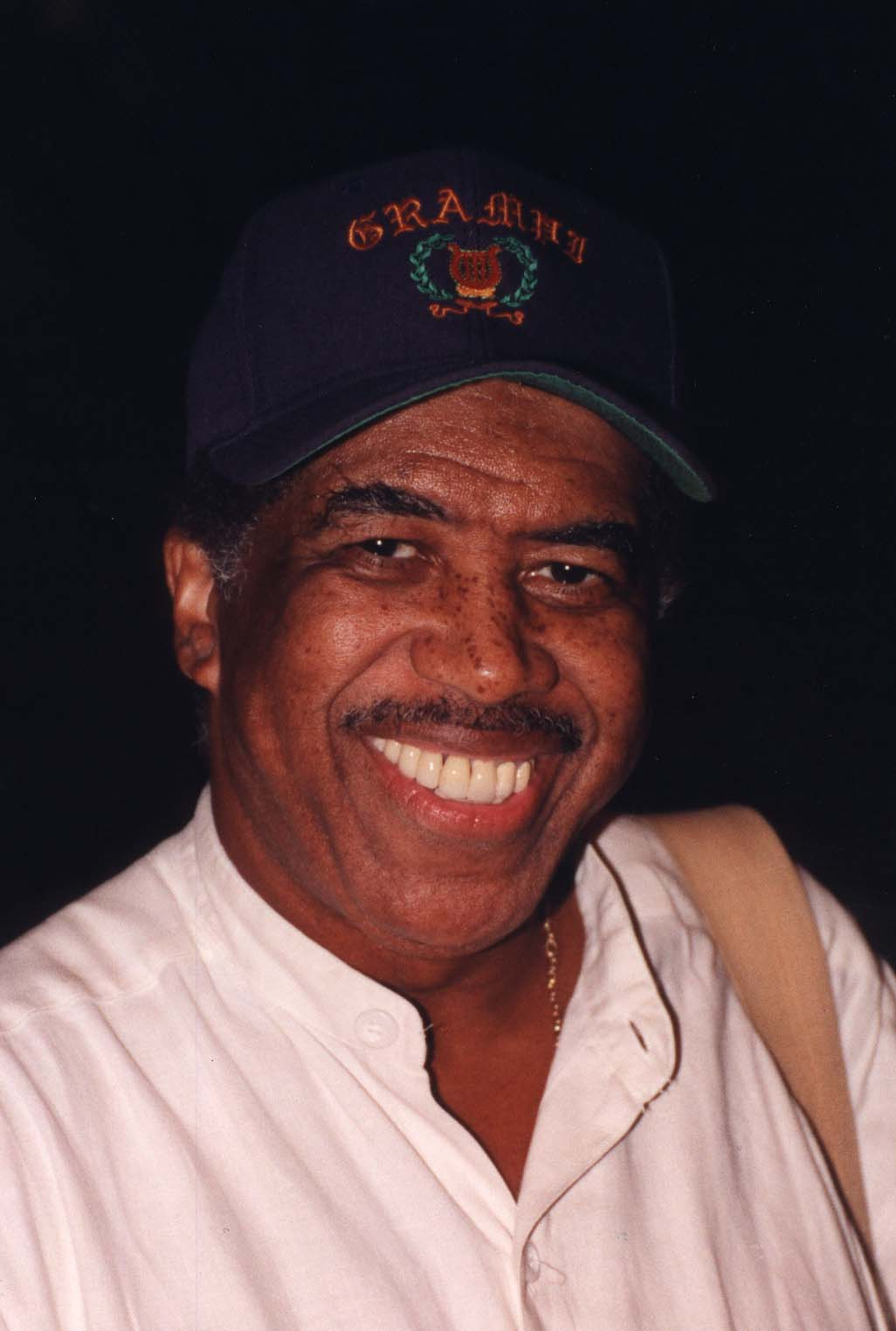
Ben E. King

- April 1
  - John Paul Hammerschmidt, United States Representative from Arkansas from 1967 to 1993 (b. 1922)
  - Eddie LeBaron, American football quarterback (b. 1930)
- April 2
  - Robert H. Schuller, minister and televangelist (b. 1926)
  - Tom Towles, actor (b. 1950)
- April 3
  - Sarah Brady, gun control activist and wife of James Brady (b. 1942)
  - Bob Burns, rock drummer (b. 1950)
- April 5
  - Richard Dysart, actor (b. 1929)
  - Victor Gotbaum, labor leader (b. 1921)
  - Lon Simmons, sportscaster (b. 1923)
  - Gardner C. Taylor, minister and civil rights activist (b. 1918)
  - Tom Towles, actor (b. 1950)
  - Julie Wilson, singer and actress (b. 1924)
- April 6
  - James Best, actor (b. 1926)
  - Ray Charles, musician, arranger and conductor (b. 1918)
  - Milton DeLugg, musician and arranger (b. 1918)
  - Ben Powers, actor (b. 1950)
  - Art Powell, American football player (b. 1937)
- April 7
  - Eugene Louis Faccuito, dancer, choreographer and teacher (b. 1925)
  - Stan Freberg, voice actor and comedian (b. 1926)
  - Stanley Kutler, historian (b. 1934)
  - Geoffrey Lewis, actor and father of Juliette Lewis (b. 1935)
  - Naomi Wilzig, writer and art collector (b. 1934)
- April 10
  - Raúl Héctor Castro, 14th Governor of Arizona (b. 1916)
  - Ray Graves, American football player and coach (b. 1918)
  - Lauren Hill, basketball player (b. 1995)
  - Judith Malina, German-born American actress, writer and director (b. 1926)
- April 13 – Herb Trimpe, comic book artist and writer (b. 1939)
- April 14
  - Homaro Cantu, American chef and inventor (b. 1976)
  - Percy Sledge, singer (b. 1940)
- April 15
  - Sidney Abbott, author and activist (b. 1937)
  - Jonathan Crombie, Canadian actor (b. 1966)
  - Barbara Strauch, journalist and author (b. 1951)
- April 16 – Lee Remmel, sportswriter and American football executive (b. 1924)
- April 17
  - A. Alfred Taubman, real estate developer and philanthropist (b. 1924)
  - Francis Eugene Cardinal George, O.M.I., Cardinal, Archbishop Emeritus of Chicago, USCCB President (b. 1937)
- April 19 – Betty Willis, visual artist and graphic designer (b. 1923)
- April 20
  - Doug Buffone, American football player and sportscaster (b. 1944)
  - Frederic Morton, Austrian-born American writer (b. 1924)
  - Bob St. Clair, American football player (b. 1931)
- April 21
  - M. H. Abrams, literary critic (b. 1912)
  - Steve Byrnes, television announcer and producer (b. 1959)
- April 22 – Audree Norton, actress (b. 1927)
- April 23
  - Richard Corliss, film critic and magazine editor (b. 1944)
  - Sawyer Sweeten, child actor (b. 1995)
- April 24
  - Thomas Joseph Connolly, American bishop (b. 1922)* 2015 – Thomas Joseph Connolly, American bishop (b. 1922)
  - Sid Tepper, songwriter (b. 1918)
  - George C. Young, lawyer and judge (b. 1916)
- April 25
  - Jim Fanning, American Canadian baseball player, manager and executive (b. 1927)
  - Dan Fredinburg, software engineer and business executive (b. 1981)
  - Don Mankiewicz, German-born American screenwriter and novelist (b. 1922)
- April 26
  - Jayne Meadows, actress, sister of Audrey Meadows and wife of Steve Allen (b. 1919)
  - Bill Valentine, baseball player and umpire (b. 1932)
- April 27
  - Suzanne Crough, actress (b. 1963)
  - Jack Ely, singer and guitarist (b. 1943)
  - Gene Fullmer, professional boxer (b. 1931)
  - Verne Gagne, American football player, professional wrestler and wrestling promoter (b. 1926)
  - Harvey R. Miller, bankruptcy lawyer (b. 1933)
- April 28
  - Marcia Brown, children's author and illustrator (b. 1918)
  - Jack Ely, guitarist and singer (b. 1943)
- April 29 – Jean Nidetch, businesswoman and weight-loss activist (b. 1923)
- April 30
  - Ben E. King, singer (b. 1938)
  - William Pfaff, author and journalist (b. 1928)

=== May ===
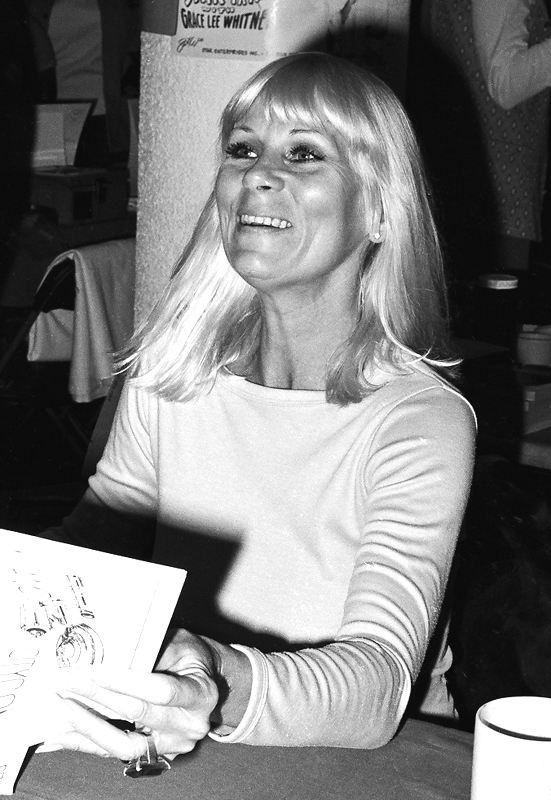
Grace Lee Whitney

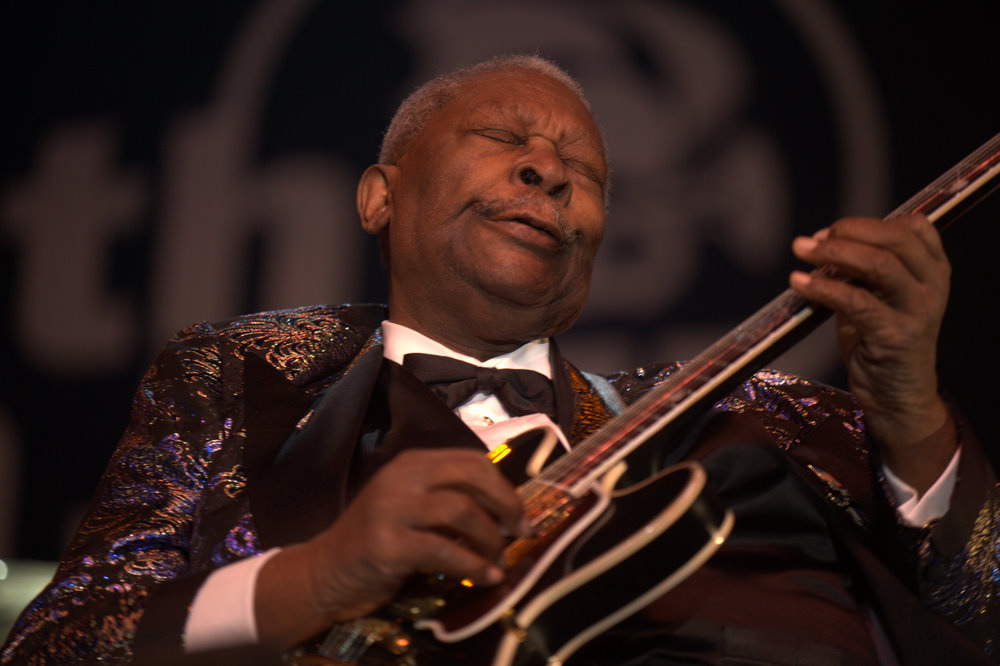
B.B. King

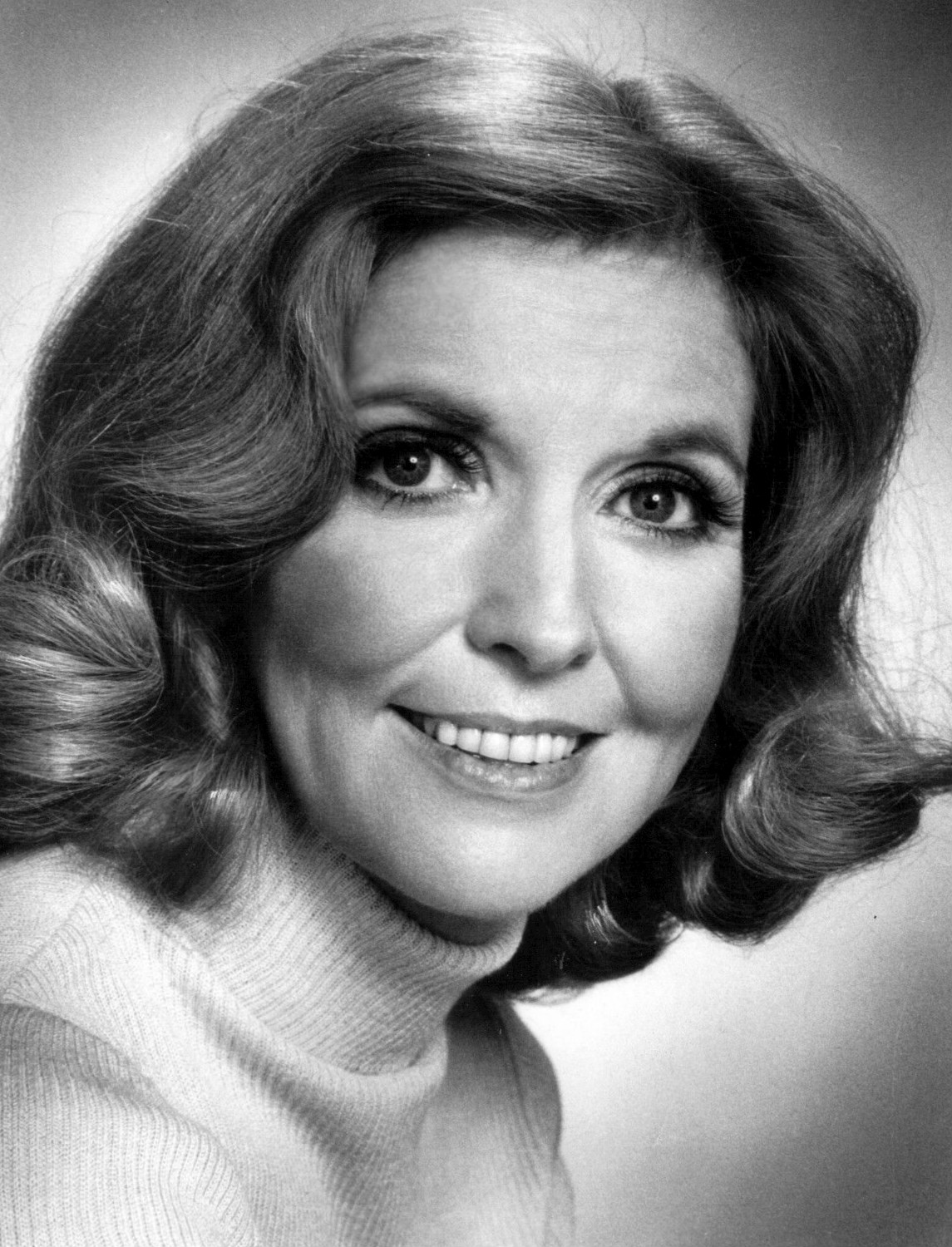
Anne Meara

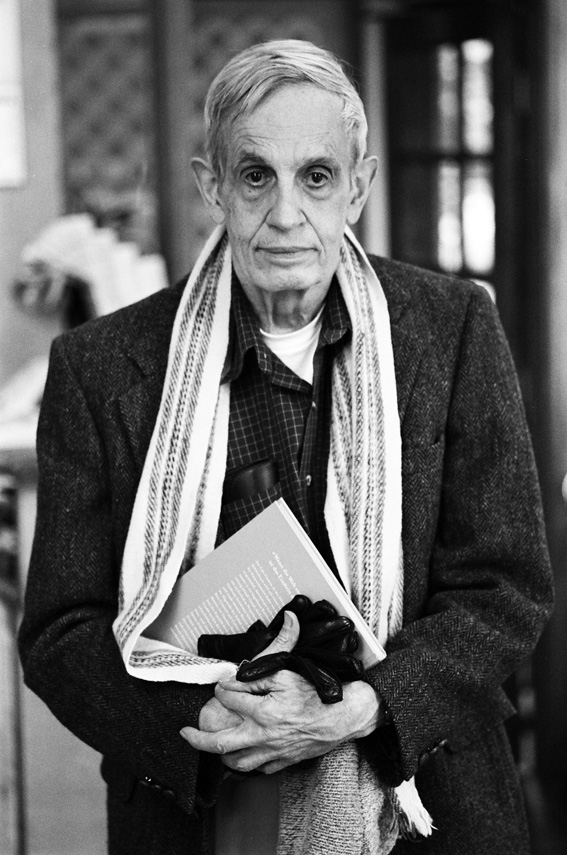
John Forbes Nash Jr.

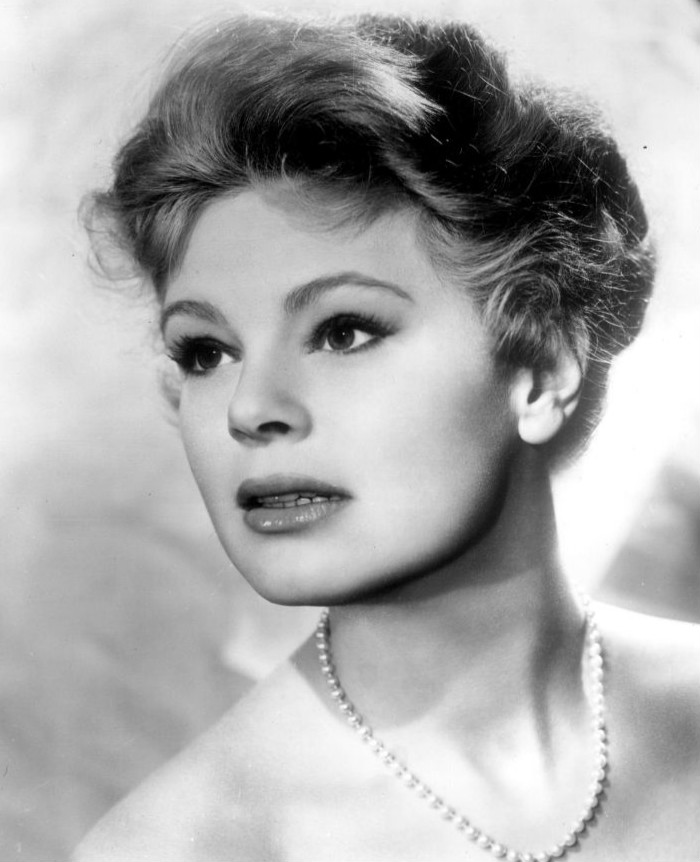
Betsy Palmer

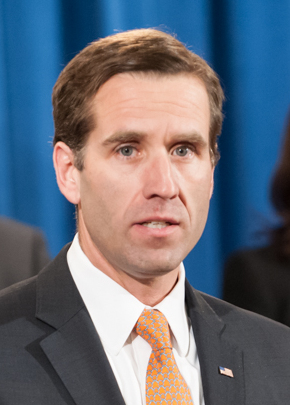
Beau Biden

- May 1
  - Stephen Milburn Anderson, director and screenwriter (b. 1948)
  - Pete Brown, golfer (b. 1935)
  - Dave Goldberg, businessman, entrepreneur and husband of Sheryl Sandberg (b. 1967)
  - Grace Lee Whitney, actress and singer (b. 1930)
- May 2
  - Michael Blake, author and screenwriter (b. 1945)
  - Guy Carawan, folk musician and musicologist (b. 1927)
- May 4
  - Ellen Albertini Dow, actress (b. 1913)
  - Marv Hubbard, American football player (b. 1946)
  - Joshua Ozersky, food writer and historian (b. 1967)
- May 5 – Oscar Holderer, German-born American scientist and engineer (b. 1919)
- May 6
  - Richard J. Bartlett, New York State legislator and jurist (b. 1926)
  - Jerome Cooper, jazz drummer (b. 1946)
  - Jim Wright, United States Representative from Texas from 1955 to 1989 (b. 1922)
- May 9
  - Johnny Gimble, country fiddler (b. 1926)
  - Elizabeth Wilson, actress (b. 1921)
- May 10
  - Jerry Dior, graphic designer (b. 1932)
  - Rachel Rosenthal, French-born American artist, teacher and activist (b. 1926)
  - Victor Salvi, harpist, harp maker and entrepreneur (b. 1920)
- May 11 – Stan Cornyn, record label executive (b. 1933)
- May 12
  - Tony Ayala Jr., boxer (b. 1963)
  - Peter Gay, German-born American historian (b. 1923)
  - Bill Guthridge, college basketball coach (b. 1937)
  - William Zinsser, writer, editor, literary critic and teacher (b. 1922)
- May 13 – Earl Averill Jr., baseball player (b. 1931)
- May 14 – B.B. King, blues musician (b. 1925)
- May 15
  - Alfred DelBello, Lieutenant Governor of New York from 1983 to 1985 (b. 1934)
  - Corey Hill, mixed martial artist (b. 1978)
  - John Stephenson, actor (b. 1923)
- May 16
  - Dean Potter, rock climber and alpinist (b. 1972)
  - Garo Yepremian, Cypriot-born American football player (b. 1944)
- May 17
  - Chinx, rapper (b. 1983)
  - Margaret Dunning, businesswoman and philanthropist (b. 1910)
- May 19
  - Bruce Lundvall, record company executive (b. 1935)
  - Dale D. Myers, aerospace engineer, Deputy Administrator of NASA, and executive (b. 1922)
  - Happy Rockefeller, wife of Nelson A. Rockefeller, Second Lady of the United States (born 1926)
- May 20
  - Bob Belden, jazz saxophonist, composer, arranger and producer (b. 1956)
  - Mary Ellen Trainor, actress (b. 1952)
- May 21 – Louis Johnson, bass guitarist (b. 1955)
- May 22
  - Marques Haynes, basketball player (b. 1926)
  - Aminah Robinson, artist
- May 23
  - Hugh Ambrose, historian and son of Stephen E. Ambrose (b. 1966)
  - Leo Berman, businessman and politician (b. 1935)
  - Anne Meara, actress and comedian, wife of Jerry Stiller and mother of Ben Stiller (b. 1929)
  - John Forbes Nash Jr., American Nobel mathematician (b. 1928)
- May 24 – Marcus Belgrave, jazz trumpeter (b. 1936)
- May 25
  - Mary Ellen Mark, photographer (b. 1940)
  - John M. Murphy, United States Representative from New York from 1963 to 1981 (b. 1926)
- May 27 – S. Parker Gilbert, business executive (b. 1933)
- May 28 – Reynaldo Rey, actor and comedian (b. 1940)
- May 29
  - Henry Carr, track and field athlete and American football player (b. 1942)
  - Doris Hart, tennis player (b. 1925)
  - Betsy Palmer, actress (b. 1926)
- May 30
  - Jim Bailey, singer, actor and female impersonator (b. 1938)
  - Beau Biden, attorney and politician, son of Joe Biden and stepson of Jill Biden (b. 1969)
  - Lennie Merullo, baseball player (b. 1917)
- May 31
  - Nico Castel, Portuguese-born American opera tenor and diction coach (b. 1931)
  - Will Holt, singer and songwriter (b. 1929)
  - Slim Richey, jazz guitarist and fiddler (b. 1938)

=== June ===
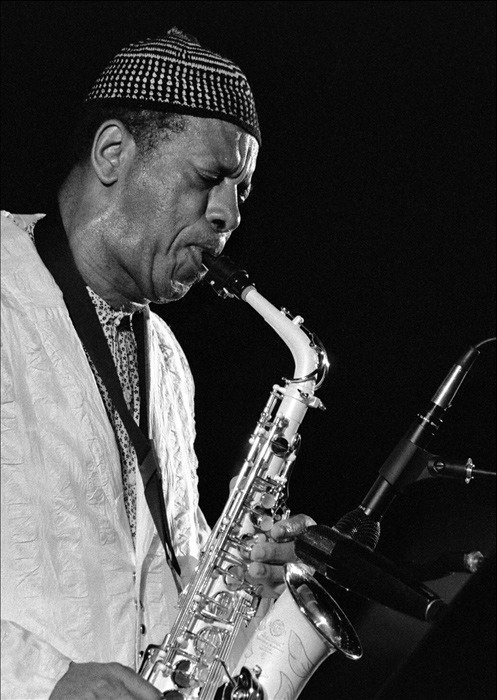
Ornette Coleman

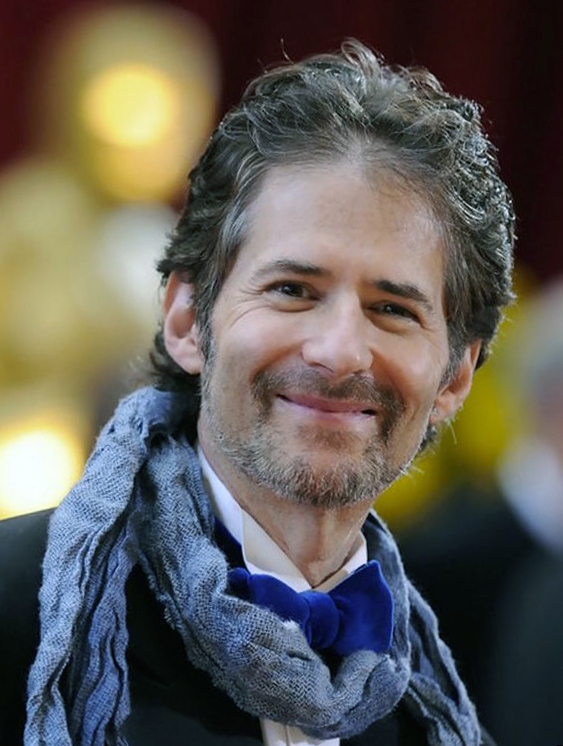
James Horner

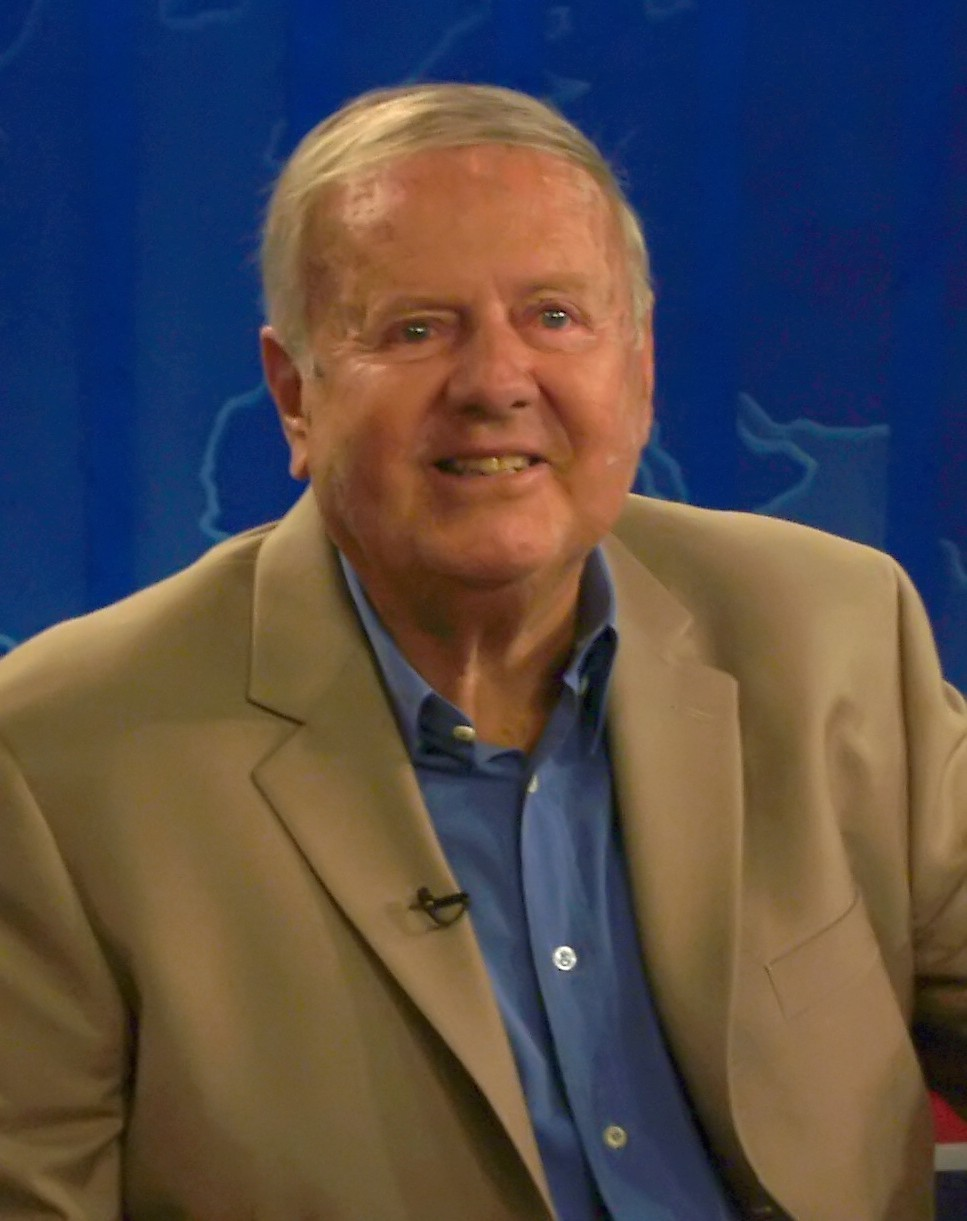
Dick Van Patten

- June 1 – Jean Ritchie, folk musician (b. 1922)
- June 2 – Irwin Rose, biologist (b. 1926)
- June 3
  - Bevo Francis, basketball player (b. 1932)
  - Paul Hackel, politician
  - Margaret Juntwait, radio broadcaster (b. 1957)
  - Eugene Kennedy, psychologist, theologian and writer (b. 1928)
- June 5
  - Jane Briggs Hart, aviator and activist (b. 1921)
  - Irving Mondschein, track and field athlete and American football player (b. 1924)
- June 6
  - Vincent Bugliosi, attorney and writer (b. 1934)
  - Ronnie Gilbert, folk musician and activist (b. 1926)
- June 7 – Harold LeDoux, cartoonist (b. 1926)
- June 8
  - Frank Cappuccino, boxing referee (b. 1929)
  - Mervin Field, pollster (b. 1921)
  - Elizabeth Peet McIntosh, spy (b. 1915)
- June 9
  - Vincent Musetto, newspaper editor and film critic (b. 1941)
  - Pumpkinhead, rapper (b. 1975)
- June 10 – Robert Chartoff, film producer (b. 1933)
- June 11
  - Jim Ed Brown, country music singer (b. 1934)
  - Ornette Coleman, jazz musician and composer (b. 1930)
  - Jack King, NASA spokesman (b. 1931)
  - Dusty Rhodes, wrestler (b. 1945)
- June 12
  - Monica Lewis, singer and actress (b. 1922)
  - Patrick Lennox Tierney, American historian and academic (b. 1914)
  - Frederick Pei Li, Chinese-born American physician (b. 1940)
- June 13 – George Winslow, child actor (b. 1946)
- June 14 – John Carroll, journalist and editor (b. 1942)
- June 15
  - Elisabeth Elliot, Belgian-born American missionary and author (b. 1926)
  - Kirk Kerkorian, businessman and philanthropist (b. 1917)
  - Blaze Starr, stripper and burlesque performer (b. 1932)
- June 16 – Stephen Blauner, music manager and film producer (b. 1933)
- June 17
  - John David Crow, American football player and coach (b. 1935)
  - Nelson Doubleday Jr., publisher and baseball owner (b. 1933)
  - Jimmy Lee, investment banker (b. 1952)
  - Clementa C. Pinckney, pastor and member of the South Carolina Senate (b. 1973)
  - Jeralean Talley, supercentenarian (b. 1899)
- June 18
  - Phil Austin, comedian and writer (b. 1941)
  - Ralph J. Roberts, businessman (b. 1920)
  - Jack Rollins, film producer and talent manager (b. 1915)
  - Danny Villanueva, American football player and broadcaster (b. 1937)
  - Allen Weinstein, historian (b. 1937)
- June 19 – James Salter, writer (b. 1925)
- June 20
  - Bob Barry Jr., sportscaster (b. 1957)
  - Harold Feinstein, photographer (b. 1931)
  - Elson Floyd, educator and university president (b. 1956)
- June 21
  - Darryl Hamilton, baseball player and broadcaster (b. 1964)
  - Gunther Schuller, musician and composer (b. 1925)
- June 22
  - Albert Evans, ballet dancer (b. 1968)
  - Donald Featherstone, artist (b. 1936)
  - James Horner, composer and conductor (b. 1953)
  - Buddy Landel, wrestler (b. 1961)
- June 23
  - Harvey Pollack, basketball statistician (b. 1922)
  - Dick Van Patten, actor (b. 1928)
- June 24
  - Mario Biaggi, United States Representative from New York from 1969 to 1988 (b. 1917)
  - Marva Collins, educator (b. 1936)
- June 25 – Patrick Macnee, English-American actor (b. 1922)
- June 26
  - Damion Cook, American football player (b. 1979)
  - Chris Thompson, television producer, director and writer (b. 1952)
  - Donald Wexler, architect (b. 1925)
- June 27 – Chris Squire, English musician and songwriter (b. 1948)
- June 28
  - Jack Carter, comedian and actor (b. 1922)
  - Thomas P. Kennedy, Massachusetts state senator (b. 1951)
  - Ben J. Wattenberg, author and commentator (b. 1933)
- June 29 – Glenn Ford, exonerated death row inmate (b. 1949)

=== July ===
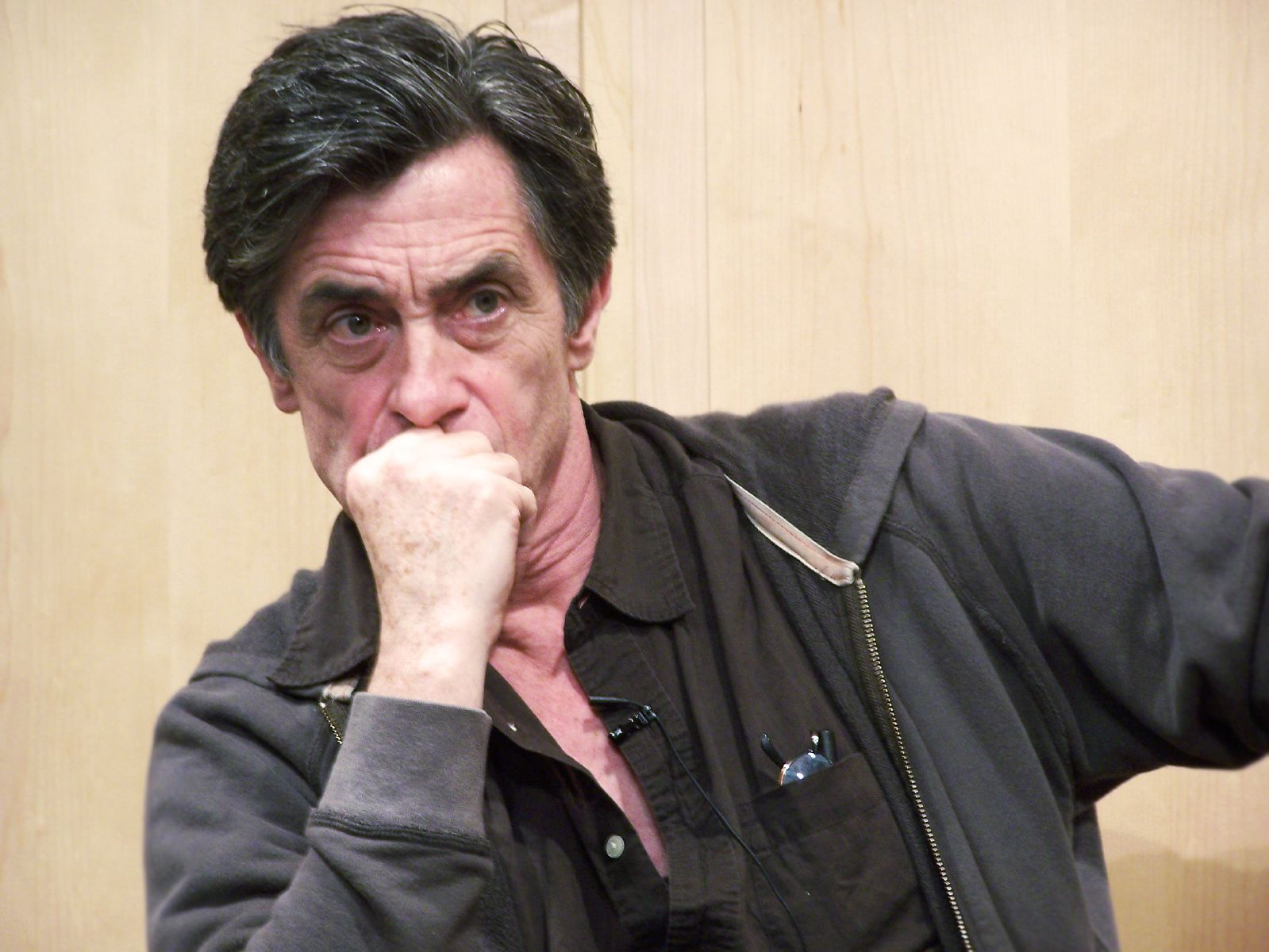
Roger Rees

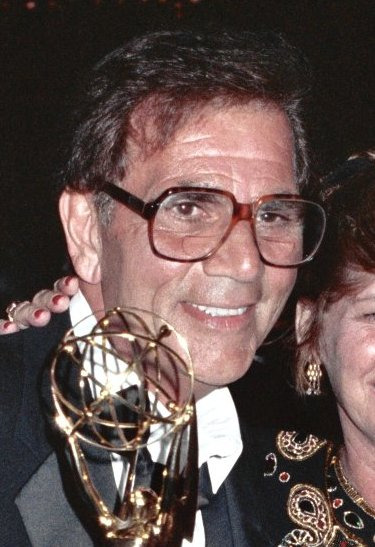
Alex Rocco

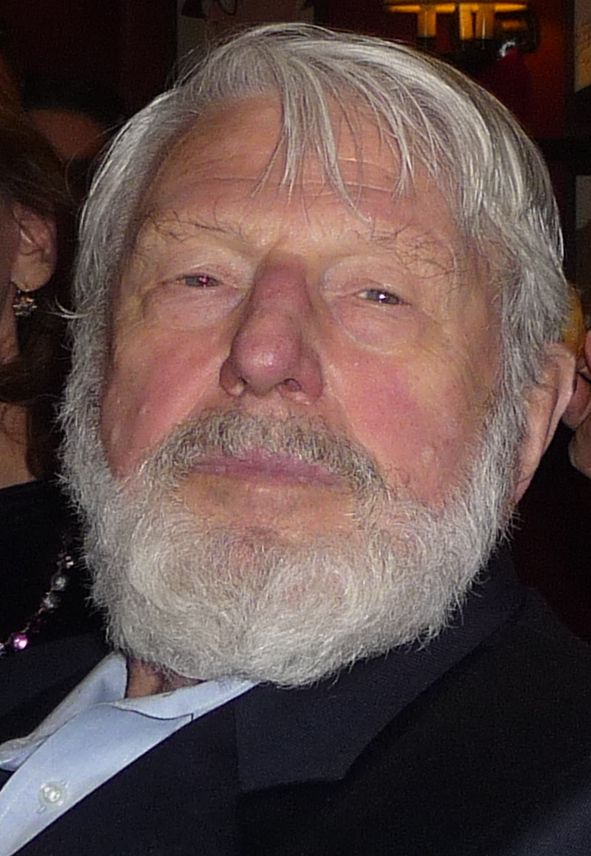
Theodore Bikel

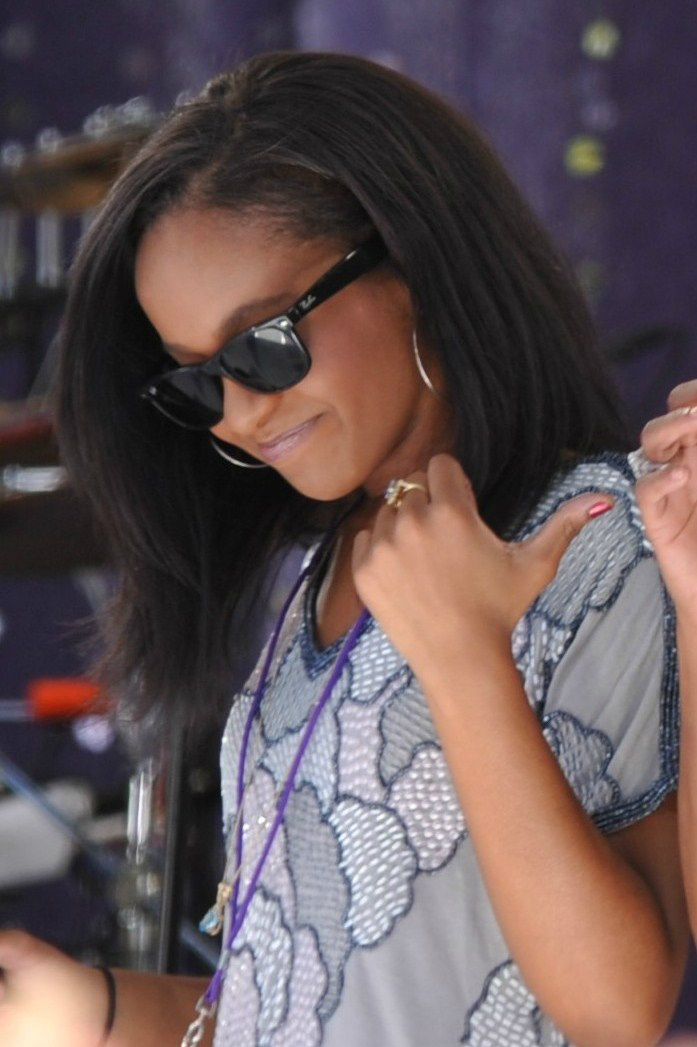
Bobbi Kristina Brown

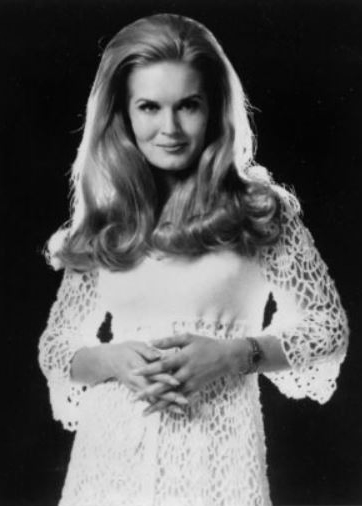
Lynn Anderson

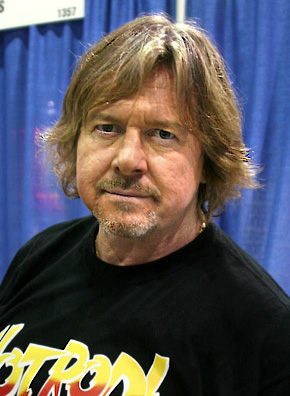
Roddy Piper

- July 1 – Lawrence Herkimer, cheerleader (b. 1925)
- July 2
  - David Aronson, Lithuanian-born American artist (b. 1923)
  - Charlie Sanders, American football player (b. 1946)
  - John Whitman, investment banker and husband of Christine Todd Whitman (b. 1944)
- July 3
  - Boyd K. Packer, religious leader (b. 1924)
  - Wayne Townsend, Indiana state senator and gubernatorial candidate (b. 1926)
- July 4
  - Scot Breithaupt, cyclist (b. 1957)
  - Diana Douglas, Bermudian-born American actress, wife of Kirk Douglas, mother of Michael Douglas and Joel Douglas (b. 1923)
  - William Conrad Gibbons, military historian (b. 1926)
- July 5
  - James Bonard Fowler, police officer and killer of Jimmie Lee Jackson (b. 1933)
  - Amanda Peterson, actress (b. 1971)
  - Burt Shavitz, beekeeper and businessman (b. 1935)
  - Jack Steadman, American football executive (b. 1928)
- July 6
  - Michael J. Birck, businessman (b. 1938)
  - Jerry Weintraub, film producer (b. 1937)
- July 8
  - Irwin Keyes, actor (b. 1952)
  - Ken Stabler, American football player (b. 1945)
  - James Tate, poet (b. 1943)
- July 9
  - Christian Audigier, French fashion designer and entrepreneur, died in Los Angeles (b. 1958)
  - Jim Bede, aircraft designer (b. 1933)
  - Paul Gebhard, anthropologist and sexologist (b. 1917)
  - Michael Masser, songwriter and record producer (b. 1941)
- July 10 – Roger Rees, Welsh actor (b. 1944)
- July 11
  - Claudia Alexander, Canadian-born American geophysicist and planetary scientist (b. 1959)
  - Patricia Crone, Danish-born American author and historian (b. 1945)
  - Hussein Fatal, rapper (b. 1977)
  - James U. Cross, general (born 1925)
  - Lawrence K. Karlton, lawyer and judge (born 1935)
- July 12
  - D'Army Bailey, activist and actor (b. 1941)
  - JaJuan Dawson, American football player (b. 1977)
- July 14 – Marlene Sanders, broadcaster and journalist, wife of Jerome Toobin and mother of Jeffrey Toobin (b. 1931)
- July 15 – Howard Rumsey, jazz double-bassist (b. 1917)
- July 17
  - Bill Arnsparger, American football coach (b. 1926)
  - John H. Gibbons, scientist (b. 1929)
- July 18
  - Buddy Buie, songwriter and record producer (b. 1941)
  - George Coe, actor (b. 1929)
  - Van Miller, American football broadcaster (b. 1927)
  - Alex Rocco, actor (b. 1936)
- July 19
  - Van Alexander, bandleader and composer (b. 1915)
  - Josh Greenberg, entrepreneur (b. 1987)
- July 20
  - Wayne Carson, musician, songwriter and record producer (b. 1943)
  - Sally Gross, dancer and choreographer (b. 1933)
  - Tom Moore, cartoonist (b. 1928)
- July 21
  - Theodore Bikel, Austrian-born American actor, musician and activist (b. 1924)
  - E. L. Doctorow, author, editor and professor (b. 1931)
  - Paul Freeman, conductor (b. 1936)
- July 22
  - Christopher M. Fairman, scholar, author, and academic (b. 1960)
  - Don Joyce, musician and radio personality (b. 1944)
  - Marilyn C. Jones, baseball player (b. 1927)
  - Daron Norwood, country music singer (b. 1965)
- July 23 – William Wakefield Baum, Roman Catholic cardinal (b. 1926)
- July 24 – Peg Lynch, actress and writer (b. 1916)
- July 26
  - Richard Bass, businessman and mountaineer (b. 1926)
  - Bobbi Kristina Brown, reality television personality and singer, daughter of Whitney Houston and Bobby Brown (b. 1993)
  - Vic Firth, musician and businessman (b. 1930)
  - Ann Rule, nonfiction crime writer (b. 1931)
- July 27 – Joe Williams, film critic (b. 1958)
- July 28
  - James H. Allen, children's television host and clown (b. 1928)
  - Carolyn Kaelin, surgeon (b. 1961)
  - Fred Otnes, illustrator (b. 1925)
- July 29
  - Buddy Emmons, guitarist (b. 1937)
  - Mike Pyle, American football player (b. 1939)
- July 30
  - Lynn Anderson, country music singer (b. 1947)
  - Jerome Kohlberg Jr., businessman (b. 1925)
  - Roddy Piper, Canadian wrestler, died in Hollywood, California (b. 1954)
  - Louis Sokoloff, neuroscientist (b. 1921)
- July 31
  - Curtis Brown, American football player (b. 1954)
  - Alan Cheuse, writer and critic (b. 1940)
  - Howard W. Jones, gynecological surgeon (b. 1910)
  - Billy Pierce, baseball pitcher (b. 1927)
  - Richard Schweiker, United States Senator from Pennsylvania (b. 1926)

=== August ===
- August 2
  - Forrest Bird, aviator, physician, and inventor (b. 1921)
  - Tyler Drumheller, intelligence official (b. 1952)
- August 3
  - Robert Conquest, Anglo-American historian and poet (b. 1917)
  - Mel Farr, American football player and businessman (b. 1944)
  - Colleen Gray, actress (b. 1922)
  - Cynthia Macdonald, poet and mother of Jennifer Macdonald (b. 1928)
  - Giovanni Riggi, mob boss (b. 1925)
  - Arnold Scaasi, Canadian fashion designer, died in Manhattan (b. 1930)
- August 4
  - Irving Harper, industrial designer (b. 1916)
  - Elsie Hillman, political leader, philanthropist, and activist (b. 1925)
  - Billy Sherrill, record producer and arranger (b. 1936)
- August 6 – Frederick R. Payne Jr., United States Marine Corps general and aviator (b. 1911)
- August 7
  - Terrence Evans, actor (b. 1934)
  - Frances Oldham Kelsey, Canadian-American pharmacologist (b. 1914)
  - Jerome G. Miller, social worker (b. 1931)
  - Louise Suggs, golfer (b. 1923)
- August 8
  - David Dill, Minnesota State Representative (b. 1955)
  - Ann McGovern, children's writer (b. 1930)
  - Sean Price, rapper (b. 1972)
  - Sam S. Walker, general (b. 1925)
- August 9
  - Frank Gifford, American football player and sportscaster, husband of Kathie Lee Gifford (b. 1930)
  - John Henry Holland, computer scientist, electrical engineer, and psychologist (b. 1929)
- August 10
  - Buddy Baker, NASCAR driver (b. 1941)
  - Biff Liff, theatrical manager and producer (b. 1919)
- August 11 – Richard S. Ross, cardiologist (b. 1924)
- August 13 – John A. Nerud, horse trainer and owner (b. 1913)
- August 14 – Bob Johnston, record producer (b. 1932)
- August 15
  - Julian Bond, Georgia state legislator and civil rights activist (b. 1940)
- August 16
  - Jacob Bekenstein, Mexican-born Israeli-American theoretical physicist (b. 1947)
  - Peter W. Schramm, Hungarian-American political scientist and academic (b. 1946)
- August 17
  - Yvonne Craig, ballet dancer and actress (b. 1937)
  - Mike Gaechter, American football player (b. 1940)
- August 18
  - William Jay Smith, poet (b. 1918)
  - Louis Stokes, United States Representative from Ohio (b. 1925)
  - Bud Yorkin, film and television producer, director, writer and actor (b. 1926)
- August 19 – George Houser, minister and civil rights activist (b. 1916)
- August 20 – Melody Patterson, actress (b. 1949)
- August 21 – Jimmy Evert, tennis player and coach, father of Chris Evert (b. 1924)
- August 22
  - Merle Reagle, crossword constructor (b. 1950)
  - Lou Tsioropoulos, basketball player (b. 1930)
- August 24 – Joseph F. Traub, computer scientist (b. 1932)
- August 25
  - James "Red" Duke, trauma surgeon (b. 1928)
  - James L. Flanagan, electrical engineer (b. 1925)
  - Frank E. Petersen, United States Marine Corps general (b. 1932)
- August 26 – Amelia Boynton Robinson, civil rights activist (b. 1911)
- August 27
  - George Cleve, Austrian-born American music conductor (b. 1936)
  - Darryl Dawkins, basketball player (b. 1957)
- August 28 – Nelson Shanks, painter (b. 1937)
- August 29 – Kyle Jean-Baptiste, actor (b. 1993)
- August 30
  - Brad Anderson, cartoonist (b. 1924)
  - Wes Craven, film director, producer, writer, and actor (b. 1939)
  - Wayne Dyer, self-help writer and motivational speaker (b. 1940)
  - Marvin Mandel, 56th Governor of Maryland (b. 1920)
  - J. Donald Millar, physician and public health administrator (b. 1934)
  - Oliver Sacks, English neurologist and writer, died in Manhattan (b. 1933)
- August 31 – Tom Scott, American football player (b. 1930)

=== September ===
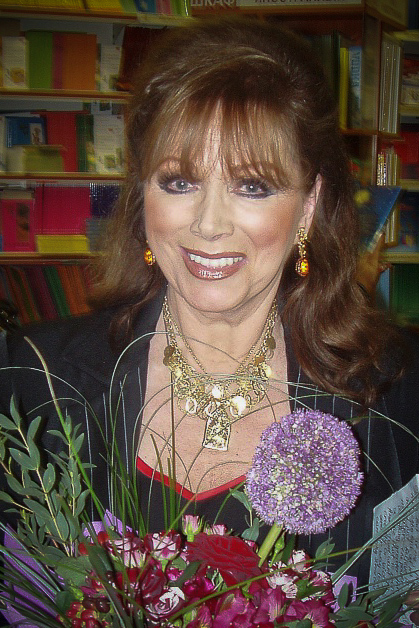
Jackie Collins

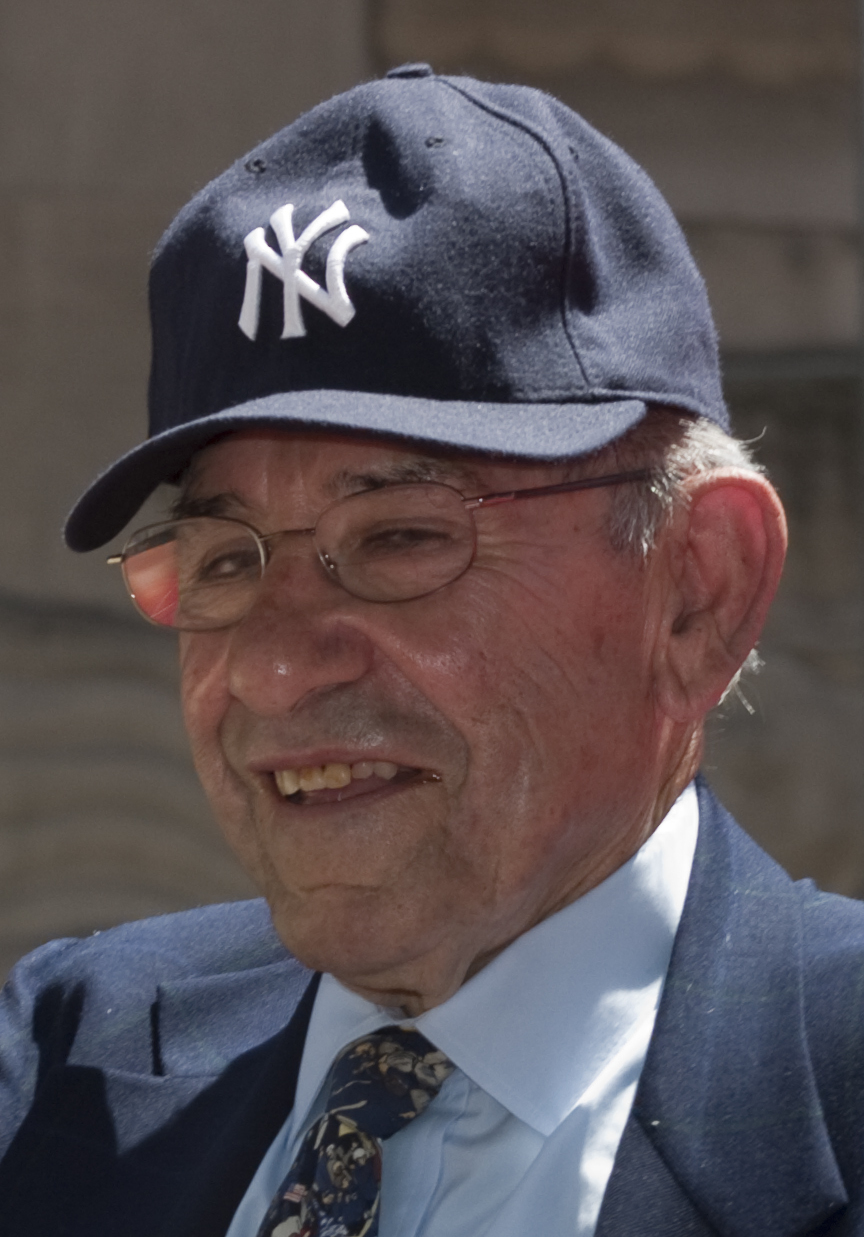
Yogi Berra

- September 1
  - Dean Jones, actor (b. 1931)
  - Ben Kuroki, combat aviator (b. 1917)
- September 2 – Ephraim Engleman, rheumatologist (b. 1911)
- September 3
  - Gabrielle Burton, novelist and screenwriter (b. 1939)
  - Stanton R. Cook, newspaper executive (b. 1925)
- September 4
  - Jean Darling, actress (b. 1922)
  - Warren Murphy, author (b. 1933)
- September 5
  - Denny Greene, singer and music executive (b. 1949)
  - Eric Palangas, politician (b. 1966)
- September 6
  - Martin Milner, actor (b. 1931)
  - John Perreault, art curator and critic (b. 1937)
  - Gaylord Shaw, journalist (b. 1942)
- September 7
  - Dickie Moore, actor (b. 1925)
  - Candida Royalle, pornographic actress, producer, and director (b. 1950)
- September 8
  - Merv Adelson, real estate developer and television producer (b. 1929)
  - Andrew Kohut, pollster and news commentator (b. 1942)
  - Tyler Sash, American football player (b. 1988)
- September 9 – Einar H. Ingman Jr., United States Army soldier and Medal of Honor recipient (b. 1929)
- September 10 – Norman Farberow, psychologist and suicidologist (b. 1918)
- September 11
  - Roy Marble, basketball player (b. 1966)
  - Lawrence S. Phillips, businessman (b. 1927)
  - Kerry Simon, chef and restaurateur (b. 1955)
- September 12
  - Melvin Bernhardt, stage and television director (b. 1931)
  - Frank D. Gilroy, playwright, screenwriter, film producer and director (b. 1925)
- September 13
  - Moses Malone, basketball player (b. 1955)
  - Gary Richrath, rock guitarist and songwriter (b. 1949)
  - Carl Emil Schorske, historian (b. 1915)
- September 16 – Joe Morrone, soccer coach (b. 1935)
- September 17 – Milo Hamilton, sportscaster (b. 1927)
- September 19 – Jackie Collins, British novelist (b. 1937)
- September 20 – Jack Larson, actor, librettist, screenwriter and producer (b. 1928)
- September 21
  - Ben Cauley, trumpeter (b. 1947)
  - Leon Root, orthopedic surgeon (b. 1929)
  - Robert E. Simon, real estate developer (b. 1914)
- September 22
  - Yogi Berra, baseball player, coach and manager (b. 1925)
  - Elizabeth Fink, civil rights attorney (b. 1945)
  - James Santini, United States Representative from Nevada (b. 1937)
  - Richard G. Scott, nuclear engineer and LDS Church leader (b. 1928)
  - Phyllis Tickle, religious writer and lecturer (b. 1934)
- September 27
  - Wilton Felder, saxophonist and bass player (b. 1940)
  - Denise Lor, singer and actress (b. 1929)
- September 30 – Donald Seawell, theater producer and newspaper publisher (b. 1912)

=== October ===
- October 1
  - Don Edwards, United States Representative from California from 1963 to 1995 (b. 1915)
  - Cal Neeman, baseball player (b. 1929)
  - Jacob Pressman, Conservative rabbi (b. 1919)
  - Johnny Strange, adventurer (b. 1991)
- October 2
  - Willie Akins, jazz saxophonist (b. 1939)
  - Hal Schacker, baseball player (b. 1925)
  - Andy Sperandeo, magazine editor (b. 1944 or 1945)
- October 3
  - Olga Hirshhorn, art collector (b. 1920)
  - Barbara Meek, actress (b. 1934)
  - Paul R. Norby, U.S. Navy admiral (b. 1913)
  - Dave Pike, jazz musician (b. 1938)
  - Arthur A. Small, lawyer and Iowa state legislator (b. 1933)
  - Peter Tillers, Latvian-born American legal scholar (b. 1943)
- October 4
  - William A. Culpepper, judge (b. 1916)
  - S. Malcolm Gillis, academic (b. 1940)
  - J. Whyatt Mondesire, journalist and civil rights activist (b. 1949)
  - Jim Thomas, American-born Canadian football player (b. 1938)
  - Neal Walk, basketball player (b. 1948)
- October 5
  - Frank Albanese, boxer and actor (b. 1931)
  - Larry Brezner, film producer (b. 1942)
  - Mary Jane Farell, bridge player (b. 1920)
  - Earnestine Howard, politician (b. 1951)
  - Andrew Rubin, actor (b. 1946)
- October 6
  - Kevin Corcoran, producer, director, and actor (b. 1949)
  - Rich Davis, physician and businessman (b. 1926)
  - Smokey Johnson, drummer (b. 1936)
  - Billy Joe Royal, singer and musician (b. 1942)
  - Sandra Spuzich, golfer (b. 1937)
  - William Stanley, mammalogist (b. ca. 1957)
- October 7
  - Gene Allen, art director (b. 1918)
  - Ray Appleton, jazz drummer (b. 1941)
  - Harry Gallatin, basketball player and coach (b. 1927)
  - Hy Hollinger, journalist and publicist (b. 1918)
  - Kenneth Koe, chemist (b. 1925)
  - Charles P. West, Delaware state legislator (b. 1921)
  - Gail Zappa, businesswoman, wife of Frank Zappa (b. 1945)
- October 8
  - Dennis Eichhorn, comics writer (b. 1945)
  - Tom Goode, American football player (b. 1938)
  - Paul Prudhomme, chef, cookbook writer and restaurateur (b. 1940)
  - Jan Wallman, nightclub owner (b. 1922)
  - Stephen B. Wiley, New Jersey state senator (b. 1929)
- October 9
  - Raymond Twomey Duncan, entrepreneur and vintner (b. 1930)
  - Koopsta Knicca, rapper (b. 1975)
  - Dave Meyers, basketball player (b. 1953)
  - Larry Rosen, record producer (b. 1940)
- October 10 – Richard F. Heck, chemist (b. 1931)
- October 11
  - Dean Chance, baseball player and manager (b. 1941)
  - Jack Drake, lawyer and politician (b. 1934)
- October 12 – Joan Leslie, actress (b. 1925)
- October 20 – Cory Wells, singer (b. 1941)
- October 21 – Marty Ingels, actor (b. 1936)
- October 23 – James P. Liautaud, industrialist, inventor and business theorist (b. 1936)
- October 24 – Maureen O'Hara, Irish-American actress (b. 1920)
- October 25 – Flip Saunders, basketball player and coach (b. 1955)
- October 26 – Leo Kadanoff, physicist (b. 1937)
- October 28
  - Pazuzu Algarad, murderer (b. 1978)
  - Nancy Dye, American historian and academic (b. 1947)
  - Bruce L. Edwards, American scholar and academic (b. 1952)
- October 30 – Al Molinaro, actor (b. 1919)
- October 31 – Charles Herbert, child actor (b. 1948)

=== November ===
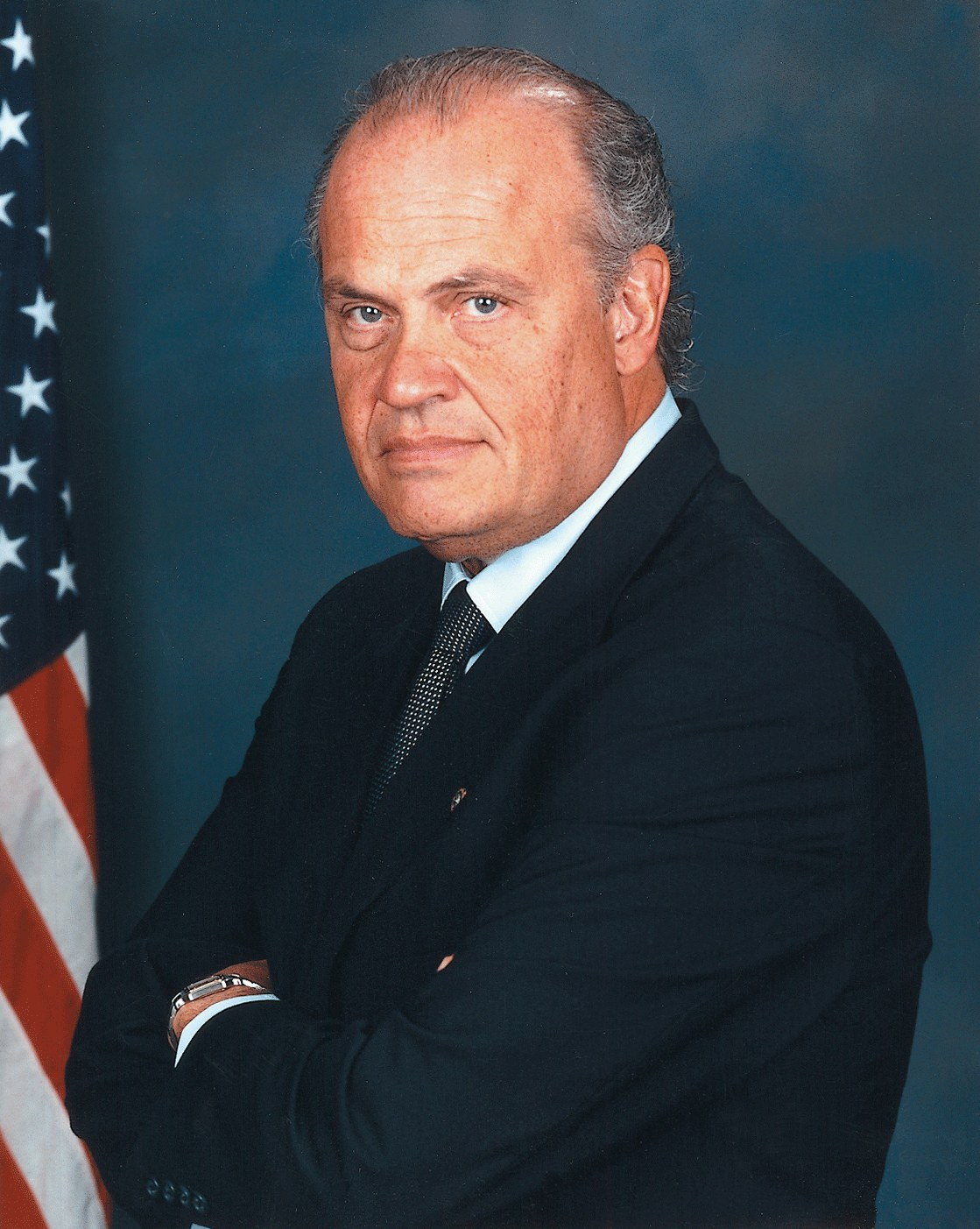
Fred Thompson

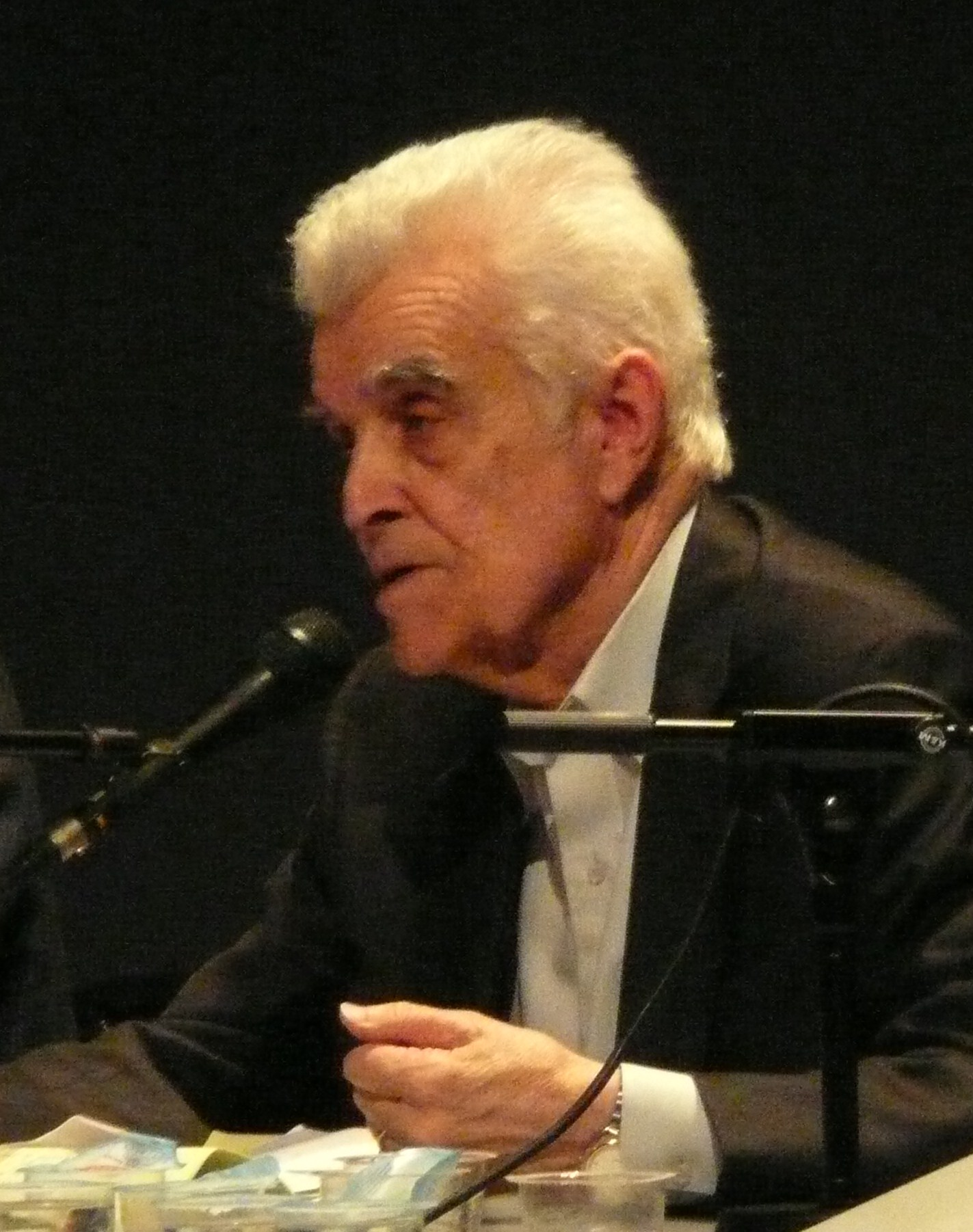
René Girard

- November 1
  - Fred Thompson, politician and actor (b. 1942)
  - Houston McTear, sprinter (b. 1957)
- November 3 – Howard Coble, politician (b. 1931)
- November 4
  - Lee Robinson, politician (b. 1943)
  - Melissa Mathison, screenwriter (b. 1950)
  - René Girard, French-born historian and literary critic (b. 1923)
- November 5
  - Ed Lechner, football player (b. 1919)
  - George Barris, custom car designer (b. 1925)
- November 6 – Chuck Pyle, country singer-songwriter (b. 1945)
- November 7
  - Gunnar Hansen, Icelandic-born actor (b. 1947)
  - Eddie Hoh, drummer (b. 1944)
  - Gladys-Marie Fry, folklorist and historian (b. 1931)
- November 9 – Andy White, Scottish drummer (b. 1930)
- November 10 – Allen Toussaint, musician and songwriter (b. 1938)
- November 11 – Nathaniel Marston, actor and producer (b. 1975)
- November 12
  - Earl E. Anderson, American general (b. 1919)
  - Bruce Dayton, businessman and philanthropist (b. 1918)
- November 14
  - Nick Bockwinkel, wrestler, sportscaster, and actor (b. 1934)
  - Norm Ellenberger, basketball player and coach (b. 1932)
- November 15 – Vincent 'Don Vito' Margera, television personality (Viva La Bam) (b. 1956)
- November 18 – Mal Whitfield, middle-distance runner (b. 1924)
- November 19 – Rex Reason, actor (b. 1928)
- November 20 – Jim Perry, television personality, game show host (b. 1933)
- November 21 – Bob Foster, boxer (b. 1938)
- November 23
  - Dan Fante, author and playwright (b. 1944)
  - Douglass North, economist and academic, Nobel Prize laureate (b. 1920)
  - Cynthia Robinson, musician (b. 1944)
  - Jim Sochor, American football player and coach (b. 1938)
- November 24 – Steve Wildstrom, technology columnist and consultant
- November 28 – Majorie Lord, actress (b. 1918)

=== December ===
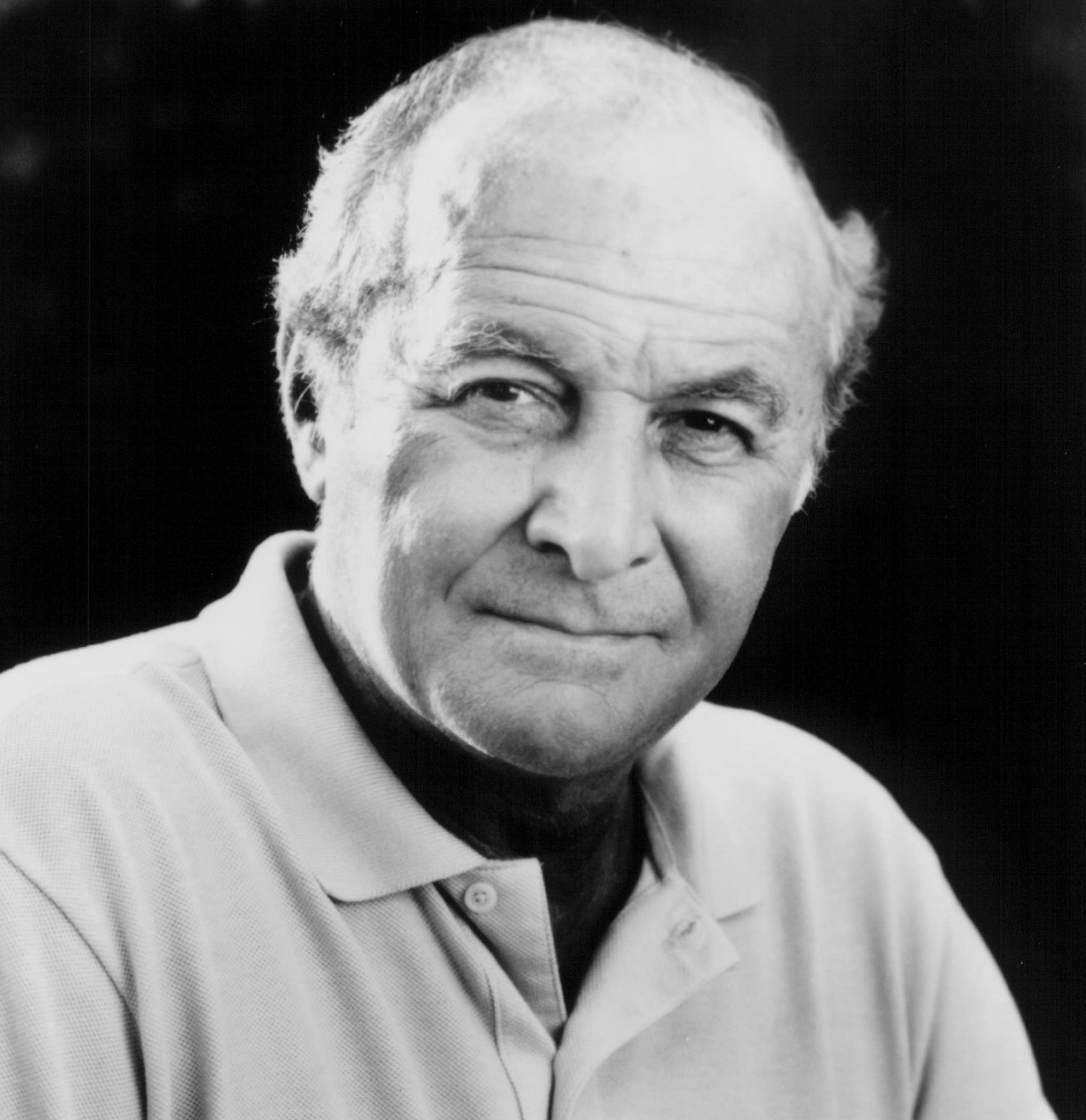
Robert Loggia

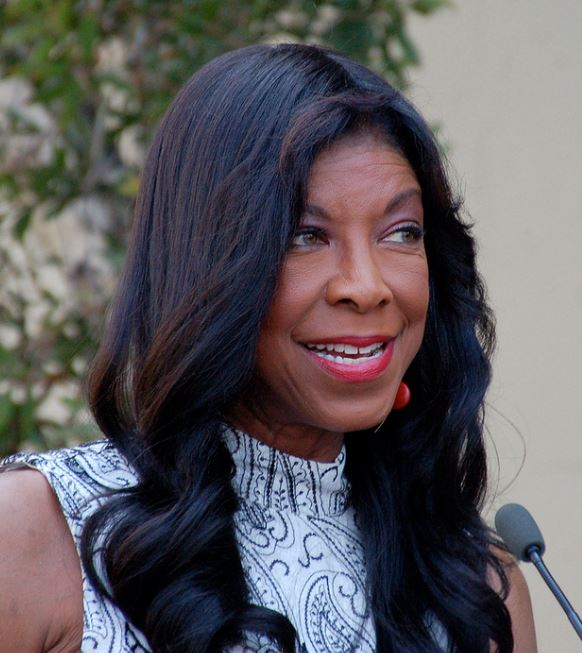
Natalie Cole

- December 1
  - Jim Loscutoff, basketball player (b. 1930)
  - Shirley Gunter, R&B singer (b. 1934)
  - Joseph Engelberger, engineer and inventor (b. 1925)
- December 2
  - George T. Sakato, soldier, Medal of Honor recipient (b. 1921)
  - Sandy Berger, Former United States National Security Advisor (b. 1945)
- December 3
  - Lawrence Pugh, businessman, chief executive of VF Corporation (b. 1933)
  - Scott Weiland, singer-songwriter and musician (b. 1967)
- December 4 – Robert Loggia, actor (b. 1930)
- December 5 – Chuck Williams, businessman and author (b. 1915)
- December 6 – Holly Woodlawn, actress (b. 1946)
- December 7
  - Martin E. Brooks, actor (b. 1925)
  - Elaine Riley, actress (b. 1917)
- December 10
  - Dolph Schayes, basketball player and coach (b. 1928)
  - Ron Bouchard, race car driver and businessman (b. 1948)
  - Michael Cavallari, brother of television personality Kristin Cavallari (b. 1985)
- December 8 – Bonnie Lou, musician (b. 1924)
- December 12
  - Rose Siggins, actress (b. 1972)
  - Evelyn S. Lieberman, former White House Deputy Chief of Staff (b. 1944)
- December 13 – Benedict Anderson, academic (b. 1936)
- December 19 – Douglas Dick, actor (b. 1920)
- December 20
  - Patricia Elliott, actress and singer (b. 1938)
  - Ray Mathews, American football player and coach (b. 1929)
  - Angela McEwan, actress (b. 1934)
- December 21
  - Arlin Adams, lawyer and judge (b. 1921)
  - Emmanuel Yarborough, sumo wrestler, mixed martial artist, and actor (b. 1964)
- December 23 – Alfred G. Gilman, pharmacologist and biochemist (b. 1941)
- December 25 – Jason Wingreen, actor (b. 1920)
- December 27
  - Ellsworth Kelly, artist and sculptor (b. 1923)
  - Haskell Wexler, cinematographer and film director (b. 1922)
  - Meadowlark Lemon, basketball player (b. 1932)
- December 28
  - Eloy Inos, 8th Governor of the Northern Mariana Islands (b. 1949)
  - Ian Murdock, German-born software programmer (b. 1973)
- December 30 – Doug Atkins, football player (b. 1930)
- December 31
  - Natalie Cole, singer and daughter of Nat King Cole (b. 1950)
  - Beth Howland, actress (b. 1941)
  - Wayne Rogers, actor (b. 1933)

== See also ==
- 2015 in American music
- 2015 in American soccer
- 2015 in American television
- 2015 in science
- 2015 United States federal appropriations
- 2015 United States presidential budget request
- List of American films of 2015
- Timeline of United States history (2010–present)
