= Deaths in November 2015 =

The following is a list of notable deaths in November 2015.

Entries for each day are listed alphabetically by surname. A typical entry lists information in the following sequence:

- Name, age, country of citizenship and reason for notability, established cause of death, reference.

== November 2015 ==
=== 1 ===
- Abdikarim Yusuf Adam, Somali military officer, Chief of Army (2015), shot.
- Bill Ballantine, 78, British-born New Zealand marine biologist.
- Ronald Desruelles, 60, Belgian Olympic athlete (1976, 1984), suicide by hanging.
- Thomas R. Fitzgerald, 74, American judge, Chief Justice (2008–2010) and member (2000–2010) of the Illinois Supreme Court, Parkinson's disease.
- José Fonseca e Costa, 82, Portuguese film director (No Trace of Sin), pneumonia.
- Anselmo Gouthier, 82, Italian politician, MEP (1979–1984).
- Gloria Salguero Gross, 74, Salvadoran politician, President of the Legislative Assembly (1994–1997), cardiac arrest.
- Stephen Hancock, 89, English actor (Coronation Street).
- Afzal Khan Lala, 89, Pakistani politician, MP for Swat (1993–1997), complications from cirrhosis.
- Houston McTear, 58, American sprinter, lung cancer.
- Charles Duncan Michener, 97, American entomologist.
- Paolo Poiret, 70, Italian actor and voice actor.
- Günter Schabowski, 86, German politician, editor-in-chief of Neues Deutschland, First Secretary of the East Berlin SED, prematurely announced the fall of the Berlin Wall.
- Hayden Shell, 78, Australian politician, member of the Victorian Legislative Assembly for Geelong West (1982–85) and Geelong (1985–92).
- Rudolf Scheurer, 90, Swiss football referee.
- Fred Thompson, 73, American politician and actor (Law & Order, Sinister, Cape Fear), U.S. Senator from Tennessee (1994–2003), minority counsel to the Senate Watergate Committee, lymphoma.
- Robert VanderLaan, 85, American politician.
- A. Veluppillai, 78, Sri Lankan Tamil academic and author.

=== 2 ===
- Frank Budgen, 61, British commercial director (Tag, Mountain), cancer.
- Andrzej Ciechanowiecki, 91, Polish art historian.
- Mike Davies, 79, Welsh tennis player, mesothelioma.
- Roy Dommett, 82, British engineer and rocket scientist.
- Peter Donaldson, 70, Egyptian-born British newsreader and radio broadcaster (BBC Radio 4), cancer.
- Christopher Duggan, 57, British historian, suicide by hanging.
- Betty Fountain, 85, American baseball player (AAGPBL).
- Anne Fulton, 64, Canadian LGBT activist.
- Hashim Abdul Halim, 80, Indian politician, West Bengal MLA for Amdanga (1977–2006) and Entally (2006–2011), heart attack.
- Omar El-Hariri, c. 71, Libyan general, traffic collision.
- Karl Jaeger, 85, American educator, writer and artist.
- Haruko Kato, 92, Japanese actress (Howl's Moving Castle, Kiki's Delivery Service).
- Alexey Kozlov, 80, Russian Soviet intelligence officer, Hero of the Russian Federation.
- Neville Lakay, 77, South African cricketer.
- Eddie Milner, 60, American baseball player (Cincinnati Reds, San Francisco Giants).
- Tommy Overstreet, 78, American country singer.
- J. D. Y. Peel, 73, British Africanist and sociologist.
- Roméo Phillion, 76, Canadian prisoner, wrongly convicted of murder, COPD.
- Miroslav Poljak, 71, Croatian water polo player, Olympic champion (1968).
- Kondavalasa Lakshmana Rao, 69, Indian actor, brain infection.
- Arthur Shaw, 91, English footballer (Arsenal).
- Donald Shell, 91, American computer scientist (Shellsort).
- Barbara Snelling, 87, American politician, Vermont Lieutenant Governor (1993–1997), State Senator (1999–2002), and First Lady (1977–1985 and 1991).
- Edward Soja, 75, American geographer.
- David Stock, 76, American composer and conductor, blood disease.
- Tan Kim Bee, 86, Malaysian Olympic weightlifter.
- Carlos Vargas Ferrer, 44, Puerto Rican politician, member of the P.R. House of Representatives, traffic collision following a heart attack.
- Colin Welland, 81, British actor and screenwriter (Kes, Straw Dogs, Chariots of Fire), Oscar winner (1982).
- Alexandre Yankoff, 84, French Olympic hurdler.

=== 3 ===
- Peter Bayley, 94, English academic.
- Adriana Campos, 36, Colombian actress (Vecinos), traffic collision.
- Judy Cassab, 95, Austrian-born Australian painter and Holocaust survivor, only woman to win two Archibald Prizes (1960, 1967).
- Ahmed Chalabi, 70, Iraqi politician, Deputy Prime Minister (2005–2006), President of the Governing Council (2003), Iraq War lobbyist, heart attack.
- Howard Coble, 84, American politician, member of the U.S. House of Representatives from North Carolina's 6th congressional district (1985–2015), complications from surgery.
- Emmett Smith Davis, 96, American colonel.
- Csaba Fenyvesi, 72, Hungarian fencer, Olympic champion (1968, 1972), cancer.
- David Graham, 91, American casting director (Three's Company, Purple Rain).
- Tom Graveney, 88, English cricketer (Gloucestershire, Worcestershire, England), Parkinson's disease.
- Paul Gundani, 49, Zimbabwean footballer (national team), suspected malaria.
- Chuck Hurston, 72, American football player (Kansas City Chiefs, Buffalo Bills), cancer.
- Richard L. Landau, 99, American endocrinologist.
- Sidney H. Lazard, 84, American bridge player.
- S. Mahalingam, 89, Sri Lankan mechanical engineer and academic.
- Thomas S. Marvel, 80, American architect.
- Fred McNeill, 63, American football player (Minnesota Vikings), complications from amyotrophic lateral sclerosis.
- Beggzadi Mahmuda Nasir, 86, Bangladeshi academic.
- Lauretta Ngcobo, 84, South African author and activist.
- Nils Nygaard, 83, Norwegian professor of law.
- Dan Poynter, 78, American author, publisher, pioneer in self-publishing, acute myeloid leukemia and renal failure.
- Paul Rose, 79, British politician, MP for Manchester Blackley (1964–1979).
- Fred J. Scollay, 92, American actor (Law & Order, Death Wish).
- Rick Sortun, 73, American football player (St. Louis Cardinals).
- Katherine Stenholm, 98, American film director.
- Ian Templeman, 77, Australian poet.
- Lesley Vance, 76, American politician, member of the Alabama House of Representatives (since 1994), colon cancer.

=== 4 ===
- Gülten Akın, 82, Turkish poet.
- Ingo von Bredow, 75, German sailor, Olympic bronze medalist (1960).
- Desmond Bull, 80, Australian cricketer.
- Seymour Chatman, 87, American film and literary critic.
- Piotr Domaradzki, 69, Polish-born American journalist (Dziennik Związkowy), essayist and historian, smoke inhalation.
- Ron Drzewiecki, 82, American football player (Chicago Bears).
- René Girard, 91, French-American historian, literary critic, and philosopher of social science.
- Ian Greer, 82, British political lobbyist (Cash-for-questions affair).
- Steve Hanson, 54, Australian rugby league player (North Sydney, Eastern Suburbs, New South Wales), heart attack.
- Veikko Heinonen, 81, Finnish ski jumper.
- Truman McGill Hobbs, 94, American judge, District Court for the Middle District of Alabama (1980–1991).
- Károly Horváth, 65, Romanian–Hungarian composer and musician.
- Ole Knapp, 83, Norwegian politician.
- Themba Makhanya, 45, Swazi Olympic athlete.
- Melissa Mathison, 65, American screenwriter (E.T. the Extra-Terrestrial, The Black Stallion, Kundun), neuroendocrine cancer.
- Hilde Nissen, 94, Danish Olympic sprinter.
- Marina Pankova, 52, Russian volleyball player, Olympic champion (1988).
- Laila Pullinen, 82, Finnish sculptor.
- Lee Robinson, 72, American politician, member of the Georgia Senate (1974–1982), Mayor of Macon (1987–1991), colon cancer.
- Jerzy Sadek, 73, Polish footballer (Sparta Rotterdam, national team).
- David Teeuwen, 45, American newspaper editor (USA Today), intestinal cancer.
- Kostas Tsakonas, 72, Greek actor, cancer.

=== 5 ===
- James Achurch, 87, Australian Olympic javelin thrower (1956).
- Lori L. Altshuler, 58, American psychiatrist and academic.
- George Barris, 89, American custom car designer (Batmobile, Munster Koach), cancer.
- Ritch Brinkley, 71, American actor (Murphy Brown, Cabin Boy, Beauty and the Beast).
- Nora Brockstedt, 92, Norwegian singer.
- Soma Edirisinghe, 76, Sri Lankan executive, film producer, philanthropist and social worker.
- Pierre Gy, 91, French chemist and statistician.
- Ehud Havazelet, 60, American author.
- Theodore Cyrus Karp, 89, American musicologist.
- Czesław Kiszczak, 90, Polish soldier and politician, last Prime Minister of the People's Republic of Poland (1989) and Minister of Internal Affairs (1981–1990).
- Ed Lechner, 95, American football player (New York Giants).
- Mikhail Lesin, 57, Russian political advisor and media executive (Gazprom-Media), creator of Russia Today, blunt force head trauma.
- Hans Mommsen, 85, German historian of Nazism and the Holocaust.
- Lar O'Byrne, 91, Irish footballer (Shamrock Rovers).
- Kjell Öhman, 72, Swedish musician.
- Dan Press, 66, American racing driver.

=== 6 ===
- Brian Cadle, 67, Canadian ice hockey player (Winnipeg Jets), brain cancer.
- Bobby Campbell, 78, British football player and manager.
- Jay Cross, 71, American futurist.
- Gimme Da Lute, 3, American racehorse, euthanized.
- José Ángel Espinoza, 96, Mexican singer, composer and actor.
- Karel Mejta, 87, Czech rower, Olympic champion (1952).
- John Pashley, 82, Australian rugby union player (national team).
- Chuck Pyle, 70, American country-folk singer-songwriter, drowned.
- Ri Ul-sol, 94, North Korean politician and military official, lung cancer.
- Yveta Synek Graff, 81, Czech opera singer and vocal coach.
- Beni Veras, 80, Brazilian politician, Governor of Ceará (2002–2003).

=== 7 ===
- Bappaditya Bandopadhyay, 45, Indian director and poet, heart attack.
- Fernande Bayetto, 87, French Olympic alpine skier.
- Fred Besana, 84, American baseball player (Baltimore Orioles).
- Thane Bettany, 86, English actor (North Sea Hijack).
- Ken Booth, 84, English footballer.
- John Davis, 72, Australian science documentary filmmaker (ABC) and climber, first person to scale Ball's Pyramid, helicopter crash.
- Carl-Åke Eriksson, 80, Swedish actor (Frostbite, The Girl Who Kicked the Hornets' Nest, The Simple-Minded Murderer), cancer.
- Gladys-Marie Fry, 84, American folklorist and historian, heart attack.
- Pancho Guedes, 90, Portuguese architect and artist.
- Gunnar Hansen, 68, Icelandic-born American actor (The Texas Chain Saw Massacre), pancreatic cancer.
- Eddie Hoh, 71, American rock drummer (The Mamas & the Papas, The Monkees, Donovan).
- John Jackson, 83, American legal scholar.
- Yitzhak Navon, 94, Israeli politician, President (1978–1983).
- David Shawcross, 74, English footballer (Manchester City, Stockport County, Halifax Town).
- Vincent Thomas, 93, American politician, Mayor of Norfolk, Virginia (1976–1984).
- João Verle, 75, Brazilian politician, Mayor of Porto Alegre (2002–2004).
- Carl L. Weschcke, 85, American publisher (Llewellyn Worldwide).

=== 8 ===
- Abd Al-Karim Al-Iryani, 81, Yemeni politician, Prime Minister (1998–2001).
- Rhea Chiles, 84, American philanthropist, First Lady of Florida (1991–1998), founder of Florida House on Capitol Hill and the Polk Museum of Art.
- Harry Clarke, 94, English footballer (Darlington) and cricketer.
- Joseph Cure, 31, American ice hockey player and actor (Miracle), traffic collision.
- Rod Davies, 85, British astronomer, cancer.
- Charlie Dick, 81, American record promoter.
- Andrei Eshpai, 90, Russian classical pianist, composer and scholar, stroke.
- Don Fargo, 85, German-born American professional wrestler (NWA).
- Luciano Gallino, 88, Italian sociologist.
- Betty Groff, 80, American chef and cookbook author, expert on the Pennsylvania Dutch cuisine.
- Aldo Guidolin, 83, Canadian ice hockey player (New York Rangers).
- Om Prakash Mehra, 96, Indian military officer, Chief of Air Staff (1973–1976), Governor of Maharashtra (1980–1982) and Rajasthan (1985–1987).
- Angad Paul, 45, British manufacturing executive and film producer (Lock, Stock and Two Smoking Barrels, Snatch, The Tournament), suicide by jumping.
- Alfred Roussel, 94, Canadian politician.
- Joel Sheveloff, 81, American musicologist.
- Maduluwawe Sobitha Thero, 73, Sri Lankan Buddhist monk and political activist.
- Dora van der Groen, 88, Belgian actress (Dokter Pulder zaait papavers).
- Leon Vlok, 86, South African cricketer (North Eastern Transvaal).

=== 9 ===
- Jacqueline A. Berrien, 53, American lawyer, chairwoman of the Equal Employment Opportunity Commission (2010–2014), cancer.
- Carol Doda, 78, American topless dancer, kidney failure.
- Ernst Fuchs, 85, Austrian painter, co-founder of the Vienna School of Fantastic Realism.
- Tommy Hanson, 29, American baseball player (Atlanta Braves, Los Angeles Angels), multiple organ failure caused by cocaine and alcohol toxicity.
- Brian Keighley, 67, Scottish physician and medical unionist (BMA).
- Ruth Kramer, 89, American baseball player (All-American Girls Professional Baseball League).
- Byron Krieger, 95, American Olympic fencer (1952, 1956), burns.
- Vito J. Lopez, 74, American politician, member of the New York State Assembly (1985–2013), cancer.
- Raymond M. MacDonald, 92, American politician.
- Sebastião do Rego Barros Netto, 75, Brazilian lawyer and diplomat, Ambassador to the Soviet Union (1990–1991), Russia (1991–1994) and Argentina (1999–2001), fall from building.
- Remko Scha, 70, Dutch computer scientist and musician.
- Yolanda Sonnabend, 80, British theatrical designer.
- Andy White, 85, British drummer (The Beatles), stroke.
- Mikhail Zubchuk, 47, Russian footballer (Saturn, Fakel).

=== 10 ===
- Gene Amdahl, 92, American computer architect and high-tech entrepreneur, pneumonia.
- Vernon Ashley, 99, American Crow Creek chief.
- David Atlas, 91, American meteorologist, stroke.
- John Carlill, 90, British rear admiral, President of Royal Naval College, Greenwich (1980–1982).
- Larry Chimbole, 96, American politician, member of the California State Assembly (1974–1978).
- Harold Collins, 90, Canadian politician, member of the Newfoundland and Labrador House of Assembly for Gander (1967–1979).
- Robert Craft, 92, American conductor and writer.
- Pat Eddery, 63, Irish jockey, eleven-time Champion Jockey, four-time Prix de l'Arc de Triomphe winner, three-time Lester Award and Epsom Derby winner, heart attack.
- André Glucksmann, 78, French philosopher and writer.
- Eric Gunderson, 92, American psychologist.
- Ameen-ud-Din bin Mohamed Ibrahim, 67, Malaysian Olympic field hockey player.
- Johannes Pujasumarta, 65, Indonesian Roman Catholic prelate, Archbishop of Semarang (since 2010).
- Bill Quinlan, 83, American football player (Green Bay Packers).
- Klaus Roth, 90, German-born British mathematician, recipient of the Fields Medal (1958).
- Helmut Schmidt, 96, German politician, Chancellor of West Germany (1974–1982), complications from surgery.
- Allen Toussaint, 77, American musician, producer, songwriter ("Fortune Teller", "Working in the Coal Mine", "Southern Nights") and arranger, heart attack.
- Alix d'Unienville, 97, French wartime spy.
- Tim Valentine, 89, American politician, member of the U.S. House of Representatives from North Carolina's 2nd district (1983–1995) and N.C. House (1955–1960), heart failure.
- Laurent Vidal, 31, French Olympic triathlete (2008, 2012), heart attack.
- Tony Worrell, 49, American basketball player (North Texas Mean Green).
- Michael Wright, 35, American-Turkish basketball player, head injury.

=== 11 ===
- Nancy Charton, 95, South African Anglican priest.
- Madeline DeFrees, 95, American poet.
- Rita Gross, 72, American Buddhist feminist theologian and author, stroke.
- Bob LaLonde, 93, American politician, member of the Wyoming Senate (1989–1994).
- Nathaniel Marston, 40, American actor (One Life to Live, As the World Turns, The Craft), spinal injuries from traffic collision.
- Ole Sjølie, 92, Norwegian painter.
- Tage Skou-Hansen, 90, Danish writer.
- Scotty Stirling, 86, American journalist and sport executive (NBA, Oakland Raiders, Oakland Oaks).
- Phil Taylor, 61, English drummer (Motörhead), liver failure.
- John M. Wahr, 64, American geophysicist, pancreatic cancer.
- Georgi Yungvald-Khilkevich, 81, Russian Soviet film director (d'Artagnan and Three Musketeers), heart failure.

=== 12 ===
- Earl E. Anderson, 96, American Marine Corps general.
- Graham Atkinson, 77, English cricketer (Lancashire, Somerset).
- Lucian Bălan, 56, Romanian footballer (Baia Mare), suicide by drug overdose.
- Anne-Marie Campora, 76, Monegasque politician, Mayor (1991–2003).
- Philip Ciaccio, 88, American judge and politician.
- José Refugio Esparza Reyes, 94, Mexican politician, Governor of Aguascalientes (1974–1980).
- Naila Faran, 37, Saudi doctor.
- Márton Fülöp, 32, Hungarian footballer (Sunderland, national team), cancer.
- Jihadi John, 27, Kuwaiti-born British Islamic State propagandist, drone strike.
- Ellsworth Kalas, 92, American Methodist theologian.
- Tom King, 91, American basketball player.
- Marie Seznec Martinez, 57, French model, cancer.
- Peter McLeavey, 79, New Zealand art dealer, Parkinson's disease.
- Harry Rowen, 90, American national security expert, heart attack.
- Aaron Shikler, 93, American artist, renal failure.
- Jaspal Singh, 47, Indian cricketer.
- Paul Stewart, 89, American historian, founder of the Black American West Museum and Heritage Center.
- Pál Várhidi, 84, Hungarian football player (Újpesti Dózsa) and manager (Újpesti Dózsa, Vác, BEAC).
- Travis Ward, 93, American oil magnate.

=== 13 ===
- Sam Adams, 87, Canadian football player (BC Lions).
- Abu Nabil al-Anbari, Iraqi militant, leader of ISIL in Libya, airstrike.
- Giorgio Bambini, 70, Italian boxer, Olympic bronze medalist (1968).
- Paul Blasingame, 96, American colonel.
- Bruce Dayton, 97, American retail executive and philanthropist, President and Chairman of Target, founder of B. Dalton.
- Glenn Goerke, 84, American academic.
- John Gray, 68, New Zealand Anglican clergyman, Bishop of Te Waipounamu (1996–2015).
- Betty Ann Grove, 86, American singer and actress.
- Petros Nazarbegian, 88, Iranian Olympic boxer.
- Johnny Podesto, 94, American football player.
- Henk Visser, 83, Dutch Olympic long jumper (1952), (1960).
- Éliane Vogel-Polsky, 89, Belgian lawyer and feminist.
- Jennifer Willems, 68, Dutch actress.

=== 14 ===
- Hemanga Baruah, 49, Indian cricketer.
- Gys van Beek, 96, Dutch-born American inventor.
- Nick Bockwinkel, 80, American professional wrestler (AWA).
- Berugo Carámbula, 70, Uruguayan actor (Son Amores) and comedian, complications from Parkinson's disease.
- Alan Davison, 79, British inorganic chemist.
- K. S. Gopalakrishnan, 86, Indian film director, screenwriter and producer.
- Cyril Pius MacDonald, 87, Canadian politician.
- Warren Mitchell, 89, British actor (Till Death Us Do Part, Death of a Salesman, The Price).
- Hisham Nazer, 83, Saudi Arabian executive and diplomat.
- Russell L. Post Jr., 78, American politician.

=== 15 ===
- Kai Atō, 69, Japanese actor and TV personality.
- Stephen Birmingham, 86, American author, lung cancer.
- LeRoy Braungardt, 76, American politician, member of the Missouri House of Representatives (1978–1985).
- Kenneth Monroe Carr, 90, American vice admiral.
- Carmen Castillo, 57, Dominican baseball player (Cleveland Indians, Minnesota Twins), heart attack.
- Dora Doll, 93, French actress (Manon, French Cancan, Julia).
- Norm Ellenberger, 83, American college basketball coach (New Mexico Lobos).
- George Genovese, 93, American baseball player (Washington Senators) and scout (San Francisco Giants).
- Guo Jie, 103, Chinese Olympic athlete (1936).
- Saeed Jaffrey, 86, Indian-born British actor (The Man Who Would Be King, Shatranj Ke Khilari, My Beautiful Laundrette), brain hemorrhage.
- Grete Jenny, 85, Austrian Olympic sprinter (1948).
- Nicoletta Machiavelli, 71, Italian actress (Navajo Joe, The Hills Run Red, Bawdy Tales).
- Vincent Margera, 59, American reality television personality (Viva La Bam, Jackass, CKY), kidney and liver failure.
- Jackie McGugan, 76, Scottish footballer (St Mirren, Leeds United).
- Moira Orfei, 83, Italian circus artist and actress (Scent of a Woman, Ursus, The Birds, the Bees and the Italians), stroke.
- Cynthia Payne, 82, British brothel keeper.
- Gisèle Prassinos, 95, French author.
- Herbert Scarf, 85, American mathematician and economist, heart failure.
- John P. Schlegel, 72, American Jesuit and academic administrator, President of Creighton University (2000–2011) and the University of San Francisco (1991–2000), pancreatic cancer.
- P. F. Sloan, 70, American singer and songwriter ("Secret Agent Man", "Eve of Destruction", "A Must to Avoid"), pancreatic cancer.
- Heinz Stickel, 66, German footballer.
- Said Tarabeek, 74, Egyptian actor, heart attack.
- Lauri Vaska, 90, American chemist.

=== 16 ===
- Yuliya Balykina, 31, Belarusian Olympic sprinter (2012), homicide. (body discovered on this date)
- Ronald Bandell, 69, Dutch mayor.
- David Canary, 77, American actor (All My Children, Bonanza).
- Louise Cowan, 98, American educator.
- Richard Cowan, 57, American opera singer and festival director.
- Ricardo Ferrero, 60, Argentine football player and coach.
- Art Fitzpatrick, 95, American art director.
- Nando Gazzolo, 87, Italian actor and voice actor (West and Soda, The Hills Run Red, Django Shoots First).
- Michael C. Gross, 70, American graphic designer and producer (Ghostbusters, Heavy Metal, Beethoven), cancer.
- Jerzy Katlewicz, 88, Polish conductor and artistic director.
- Wally Kincaid, 89, American Hall of Fame college baseball coach (Cerritos College).
- Kwek Leng Joo, 62, Singaporean businessman, heart attack.
- Paul Laffoley, 80, American artist and architect, heart failure.
- Seymour Lipkin, 88, American concert pianist, conductor, and educator.
- Bert Olmstead, 89, Canadian Hall of Fame ice hockey player (Montreal Canadiens, Chicago Black Hawks, Toronto Maple Leafs), complications from a stroke.
- Mel Ryan, 82, British cricketer (Yorkshire).
- Alton D. Slay, 91, American air force general, blood cancer.
- Glee S. Smith Jr., 94, American politician, member of the Kansas Senate (1957–1973).
- Soviet Song, 15, Irish-bred British-trained thoroughbred racehorse, Cartier Champion Older Horse 2004, euthanized.
- David Steen, 79, British newspaper and magazine photographer.
- Barbara Thiering, 85, Australian theologian, writer and Biblical revisionist (Jesus the Man).

=== 17 ===
- Al Aarons, 83, American jazz trumpeter (Count Basie Orchestra).
- Ishtiaq Ahmad, 74, Pakistani spy fiction author, heart attack.
- Igwe Aja-Nwachukwu, 63, Nigerian politician, Federal Minister of Education (2007–2008).
- Monique Baelden, 77, French Olympic gymnast.
- Ed Boykin, 83, American politician.
- Donald Brian, 90, New Zealand cricketer.
- Guy Buckingham, 94, British engineer and automobile designer (Nota).
- Mario Cervi, 94, Italian essayist and journalist, co-founder of Il Giornale.
- Milton Crenchaw, 96, American aviator (Tuskegee Airmen), cardiovascular disease and pneumonia.
- John Gainsford, 77, South African rugby union player (Springboks), cancer.
- Drago Grubelnik, 39, Slovene Olympic alpine skier (1998, 2002, 2006), traffic collision.
- Sir John Leahy, 87, British diplomat, High Commissioner to Australia (1984–1988).
- Rahim Moeini Kermanshahi, 89, Iranian poet.
- Pithukuli Murugadas, 95, Indian devotional singer.
- Olaf H. Olsen, 87, Danish historian and archaeologist.
- Terence Robbins, 81, Welsh rugby union and rugby league footballer.
- Laura Rockefeller Chasin, 79, American philanthropist.
- Ashok Singhal, 89, Indian Hindu activist.
- David VanLanding, 51, American rock singer (Michael Schenker Group, Crimson Glory), traffic collision.

=== 18 ===
- Abdelhamid Abaaoud, 28, Belgian suspected ringleader of the November 2015 Paris attacks, shot.
- Bjørn Borgen, 78, Norwegian footballer (Fredrikstad, national team).
- Charles Cawley, 75, American businessman (MBNA).
- Fang Jing, 44, Chinese news anchor (CCTV), cancer.
- Rosetta A. Ferguson, 95, American politician.
- Daniel Ferro, 94, American opera singer and vocal coach.
- Wilbur Foss, 94, American politician and musician.
- Dan Halldorson, 63, Canadian golfer, stroke.
- Redvers Kyle, 86, South African-British television continuity announcer, voice-over artist and actor.
- Jonah Lomu, 40, New Zealand rugby union player (All Blacks), heart attack.
- William A. Longacre, 77, American archaeologist.
- Mack McCormick, 85, American musicologist and folklorist, esophageal cancer.
- Lindela Ndlovu, Zimbabwean educator, Vice-Chancellor of National University of Science and Technology.
- Norman C. Pickering, 99, American engineer and inventor.
- James Prideaux, 88, American playwright and screenwriter, stroke.
- Harold Searles, 97, American psychiatrist.
- Jim Slater, 86, British financier.
- André Valmy, 96, French actor.
- Jim Whitty, 84, American politician.

=== 19 ===
- Armand, 69, Dutch protest singer, pneumonia.
- Ricardo de la Cierva, 89, Spanish historian and politician, Culture Minister (1980) and Senator by Murcia (1977–1979).
- Rex Cunningham, 91, New Zealand rugby league player.
- Sir Naim Dangoor, 101, Iraqi-born British businessman and philanthropist.
- Ann Downer, 54, American writer, amyotrophic lateral sclerosis.
- Allen E. Ertel, 78, American politician, member of the U.S. House of Representatives from Pennsylvania's 17th district (1977–1983).
- James Evans, 52, American football player (Kansas City Chiefs, Tampa Bay Buccaneers).
- John Hall-Jones, 88, New Zealand historian.
- János Herbst, 59, Hungarian footballer and politician, MP (1998–2002).
- Ron Hynes, 64, Canadian folksinger ("Sonny's Dream"), throat cancer.
- John A. Knauss, 90, American oceanographer.
- Stuart Parsell, 87, American football coach.
- Korrie Layun Rampan, 62, Indonesian author and politician.
- Rex Reason, 86, German-born American actor (This Island Earth, The Creature Walks Among Us, The Roaring 20's).
- Jim Stump, 83, American baseball player (Detroit Tigers).
- R. K. Trivedi, 94, Indian politician, Governor of Gujarat (1986–1990).
- Herman Wecke, 88, American soccer player.
- Mal Whitfield, 91, American middle-distance runner, Olympic champion (1948, 1952) and aviator (Tuskegee Airmen).
- John Eugene Zuccotti, 78, American businessman, namesake of Zuccotti Park.

=== 20 ===
- Malcolm H. Chisholm, 70, British inorganic chemist.
- Peter Dimmock, 94, British broadcaster (Sportsview).
- Vlatko Dulić, 72, Croatian actor and theatre director.
- Miroslav Fiedler, 89, Czech mathematician.
- Ronald Frankenberg, 86, British anthropologist.
- Ruth Giddings, 104, Irish bridge player.
- Néstor Isella, 78, Argentine football player and coach.
- Lex Jacoby, 85, Luxembourgish writer.
- Austin H. Kiplinger, 97, American journalist.
- Svetlana Kitova, 55, Russian middle-distance runner.
- Agustín Mantilla, 70, Peruvian economist and politician.
- Keith Michell, 88, Australian actor (The Six Wives of Henry VIII, Henry VIII and His Six Wives, Murder, She Wrote) and director.
- Jan Monrad, 64, Danish comedian and entertainer, blood clot.
- Nguyen Thien Dao, 75, Vietnamese-French composer.
- Carlos Oroza, 92, Spanish poet.
- Richard Owen, 92, American federal judge and composer.
- Jim Perry, 82, American television emcee (Definition, Card Sharks, $ale of the Century), cancer.
- Héctor Salva, 75, Uruguayan international footballer.
- Nancy Sandars, 101, British archaeologist.
- Kitanoumi Toshimitsu, 62, Japanese sumo wrestler, chairman of the Japan Sumo Association (2002–2008, since 2012), multiple organ failure.
- Raymond van Schoor, 25, Namibian cricketer, stroke.

=== 21 ===
- Gregory H. Adamian, 89, American academic.
- Gil Cardinal, 65, Canadian filmmaker, cirrhosis.
- Kerry Dineen, 63, American baseball player (New York Yankees), cancer.
- Ameen Faheem, 76, Indian-born Pakistani politician, Commerce Minister (2008–2013) and poet, leukaemia.
- Fan Xuji, 101, Chinese academic.
- Bob Foster, 77, American boxer, world light heavyweight champion (1968–1974).
- Linda Haglund, 59, Swedish Olympic sprinter (1972, 1976, 1980), cancer and pulmonary hemorrhage.
- Adele Horin, 64, Australian writer and journalist, lung cancer.
- Ken Johnson, 82, American baseball player (Atlanta Braves, Houston Astros).
- Paku Alam IX, 77, Indonesian prince and politician.
- Tayva Patch, 62, American actress in Mormon cinema, complications from surgery.
- Cavit Şadi Pehlivanoğlu, 88, Turkish politician, member of the Grand National Assembly of Turkey (1961–1996), complications from pneumonia.
- Anthony Read, 80, British screenwriter (Doctor Who).
- Red Cadeaux, 9, British-bred Australian racehorse, three-time runner-up in the Melbourne Cup, euthanized after race injury.
- Sheldon L. Rittmer, 87, American politician.
- Germán Robles, 86, Spanish-Mexican actor.
- Joseph Silverstein, 83, American violinist and conductor, heart attack.
- Zoran Ubavič, 50, Slovenian footballer.

=== 22 ===
- Hazel Adair, 95, British television writer (Crossroads, Compact, Emergency – Ward 10).
- Abubakar Audu, 68, Nigerian politician, Governor of Kogi State (1992–1993, 1999–2003), heart attack.
- Henson P. Barnes, 81, American politician, member of the North Carolina Senate (1977–1992).
- Salahuddin Quader Chowdhury, 66, Bangladeshi politician and convicted war criminal, execution by hanging.
- Howard E. Greer, 94, American vice admiral.
- Jerzy Karasiński, 73, Polish footballer (Lech Poznań).
- Kim Young-sam, 87, South Korean politician, President (1993–1998), heart failure.
- Sipke van der Land, 78, Dutch presenter (NCRV).
- Weslyn Mather, 70, Canadian politician, Alberta MLA for Edmonton-Mill Woods (2004–2008), skin infection.
- Valentin Mogilny, 49, Ukrainian Soviet gymnast, heart attack.
- Ali Ahsan Mohammad Mojaheed, 67, Bangladeshi politician and convicted war criminal, execution by hanging.
- Adele Morales, 90, American painter, pneumonia.
- Nola, 41, Sudanese-born American and last surviving female northern white rhinoceros, euthanized.
- Albert Pick, 93, German numismatist.
- Alfredo Prucker, 89, Italian Olympic Nordic skier, (1948), (1952), (1956).
- Ingeborg Sjöqvist, 103, Swedish Olympic diver (1932, 1936).
- Robin Stewart, 69, British actor (Bless This House, Cromwell, The Legend of the 7 Golden Vampires).
- Edward H. Sussenguth, 83, American engineer.
- André Waignein, 73, Belgian composer.

=== 23 ===
- Jamiluddin Aali, 90, Pakistani Urdu poet.
- Topazia Alliata, 102, Italian painter and writer.
- Pierre Bernard, 73, French graphic artist and designer.
- Manmeet Bhullar, 35, Canadian politician, Alberta MLA (Calgary-Greenway) and cabinet minister, traffic collision.
- Jerzy Browkin, 81, Polish mathematician.
- Dan Fante, 71, American author and playwright.
- Jacob Highland, 82, American Olympic volleyball player.
- Hazel Holt, 87, British novelist.
- Steve Hrymnak, 89, Canadian ice hockey player (Chicago Black Hawks).
- Kâmran İnan, 86, Turkish politician.
- Jouni Kaipainen, 58, Finnish composer.
- Renata Kambolina, 16, Russian student, suicide.
- Alex Kersey-Brown, 73, Welsh rugby player, cancer.
- Chuck Lamson, 76, American football player (Los Angeles Rams, Minnesota Vikings).
- Beatriz Lockhart, 71, Uruguayan pianist and composer.
- Antônio Lomanto Júnior, 90, Brazilian politician, Governor of Bahia (1963–1967).
- Sam Mardian, 96, American politician, Mayor of Phoenix (1960–1964).
- Douglass North, 95, American economist and laureate of the Nobel Memorial Prize in Economic Sciences (1993), esophageal cancer.
- Lev Okun, 86, Russian theoretical physicist.
- Juan Quarterone, 80, Argentine football player and coach.
- Kaladevanhalli Ramprasad, 81, Indian cricketer.
- Cynthia Robinson, 71, American trumpeter and vocalist (Sly and the Family Stone), cancer.
- Willie Royster, 61, American baseball player (Baltimore Orioles).
- Otto Schaden, 78, American Egyptologist.
- Virginia Seay, 93, American composer and musicologist.
- Jim Sochor, 77, American football player and coach (UC Davis), cancer.
- Ankie Stork, 94, Dutch World War II resistance fighter.
- Seyfi Tatar, 67, Turkish Olympic boxer.
- Yoram Tsafrir, 77, Israeli archaeologist.

=== 24 ===
- Sir Robert Ford, 91, British army general Adjutant-General to the Forces (1978–1981).
- John Forrester, 66, British historian and philosopher of science, cancer.
- Pierre Gabriel, 82, French mathematician (Gabriel's theorem).
- Zdeněk Humhal, 81, Czech volleyball player, Olympic silver medalist (1964).
- Jack C. Inman, 90, American politician.
- Al Markim, 88, American actor (Tom Corbett, Space Cadet).
- Quincy Monk, 36, American football player (New York Giants, Houston Texans), cancer.
- Marium Mukhtiar, 23, Pakistani fighter pilot, plane crash.
- Heinz Oberhummer, 74, Austrian physicist.
- A. S. Ponnammal, 89, Indian politician, cancer.
- Aubrey Sheiham, 79, South African-born British dental epidemiologist.
- Douglas W. Shorenstein, 60, American real estate developer, chairman of the board of the Federal Reserve Bank of San Francisco, cancer.
- Bobby Smith, 81, American baseball player (St. Louis Cardinals, Philadelphia Phillies, New York Mets).
- Niel Tupas Sr., 82, Filipino politician, prostate cancer and heart failure.
- Varduhi Varderesyan, 87, Romanian-born Armenian actress.
- Aurora Venturini, 92, Argentine author.
- Steven Vogel, 75, American biologist, cancer.
- Steve Wildstrom, 68, American technology journalist (BusinessWeek), brain cancer.
- Mieko Yagi, 65, Japanese Olympic equestrian.
- Dorothea Zucker-Franklin, 86, German-born American physician and medical researcher.

=== 25 ===
- O'Neil Bell, 40, Jamaican cruiserweight boxer, undisputed world champion (2006), shot.
- Sir Jeremy Black, 83, British admiral.
- Kerry Casey, 61, Australian actor, writer and director (George of the Jungle 2, Mighty Morphin Power Rangers: The Movie), cancer.
- Svein Christiansen, 74, Norwegian jazz drummer.
- Gloria Contreras Roeniger, 81, Mexican dancer and choreographer.
- Jean Corti, 86, French accordionist.
- Judith Fitzgerald, 63, Canadian poet.
- Eva Fuka, 88, Czech-born American photographer.
- Lennart Hellsing, 96, Swedish author and translator.
- Pierre-Yvon Lenoir, 79, French Olympic middle-distance runner (1960).
- Chris Martin, 42, British civil servant, Principal Private Secretary to the Prime Minister (since 2012), cancer.
- Beth Rogan, 84, British actress (Mysterious Island).
- Inuwa Wada, 98, Nigerian politician.
- Elmo Williams, 102, American editor and producer (High Noon, The Longest Day, Tora! Tora! Tora!), Oscar winner (1953).
- Ken Woolley, 82, Australian architect.

=== 26 ===
- Amir Aczel, 65, Israeli-born American mathematician and scientist, cancer.
- Ronnie Bright, 77, American bass singer (The Cadillacs, The Coasters, The Valentines).
- Jorgo Bulo, 76, Albanian philologist and historian.
- Eldzier Cortor, 99, American artist.
- Eddy De Leeuw, 59, Belgian Olympic sprinter.
- Tom Dublinski, 85, American football player (Toronto Argonauts, Detroit Lions, Hamilton Tiger-Cats).
- Norbert Gastell, 86, German actor and voice actor (Homer Simpson).
- Tommy Gilbert, 75, American professional wrestler (CWA/USWA) and referee (UWF).
- Jytte Hansen, 83, Danish Olympic swimmer.
- Noboru Karashima, 82, Japanese historian.
- Jerrold Kemp, 94, American academic.
- Del Kennedy, 92, Australian football player (Footscray).
- Guy Lewis, 93, American Hall of Fame college basketball coach (Houston Cougars).
- Tom Moss, 87, American politician, Speaker (1991–2000) and member of the Virginia House of Delegates (1966–2002), heart attack.
- Larry Powers, 76, American bodybuilder and actor (Me, Natalie).
- George Pyne III, 74, American football player (Boston Patriots), cancer.
- Jovan Šarčević, 49, Serbian footballer (FK Proleter Zrenjanin).
- Sumiko Shirakawa, 80, Japanese voice actress (Doraemon, Sazae-san, Space Dandy), subarachnoid hemorrhage.
- Bill Stauffer, 85, American basketball player (Missouri Tigers), brain hemorrhage.
- David Steinmetz, 79, American historian.
- Bill Tucker, 73, American football player (San Francisco 49ers, Chicago Bears), heart attack.
- Gordon Wallace, 86, Canadian boxer.
- James A. Winnefeld Sr., 86, American rear admiral.
- H. Khekiho Zhimomi, 69, Indian politician, heart ailment.

=== 27 ===
- Humza Al-Hafeez, 84, American police officer and activist.
- Ragnhild Barland, 81, Norwegian politician, member of Parliament (1985–1997).
- Mark Behr, 52, Tanzanian-born South African author (The Smell of Apples).
- José Benedito Simão, 64, Brazilian Roman Catholic prelate, Bishop of Assis (since 2009).
- Ursula Cowgill, 88, American biologist and anthropologist.
- Ian Dargie, 84, English footballer (Brentford).
- Luca De Filippo, 67, Italian actor and theatre director.
- Esperanza Guisán, 75, Spanish philosopher.
- Barbro Hiort af Ornäs, 94, Swedish actress (Brink of Life, The Touch, Shame).
- V. Krishnaprasad, 69, Indian cricketer.
- Alexander Kukarin, 22, Russian modern pentathlete, heart attack.
- Lou Marone, 69, American baseball player (Pittsburgh Pirates).
- Mukund Sathe, 78, Indian cricketer.
- Maurice Strong, 86, Canadian businessman and diplomat.
- Garrett Swasey, 44, American police officer and junior ice dancing champion (1992), shot.
- J. Randolph Tucker Jr., 101, American politician and judge.
- Xosé Neira Vilas, 87, Spanish author.
- Philippe Washer, 91, Belgian tennis player.

=== 28 ===
- Mircea Anca, 55, Romanian actor and director, leukemia.
- Aurèle Audet, 95, Canadian politician.
- Yoka Berretty, 87, Dutch actress (Makkers Staakt uw Wild Geraas, The Silent Raid, Punk Lawyer).
- Luc Bondy, 67, Swiss theater and opera director.
- Walter Bruce, 77, Northern Irish footballer (Glentoran).
- Gerry Byrne, 77, English footballer (Liverpool, national team), World Cup Champion (1966), Alzheimer's disease.
- Marion Crecco, 85, American politician, member of the New Jersey General Assembly (1986–2002).
- Tahir Elçi, 49, Turkish pro-Kurdish lawyer, shot.
- Federico O. Escaler, 93, Filipino Roman Catholic prelate, Prelate of Kidapawan (1976–1980) and Ipil (1980–1997).
- Ivan Hlevnjak, 71, Croatian Yugoslav footballer.
- Stan Holek, 82, Canadian professional wrestler.
- Jean Joubert, 87, French author.
- Doug Lennox, 77, Canadian actor (X-Men, Police Academy, Lars and the Real Girl) and writer.
- Lin Rong-San, 76, Taiwanese billionaire politician, publisher and businessman, cardiopulmonary failure.
- Marjorie Lord, 97, American film and television actress (The Danny Thomas Show).
- Nauro Machado, 80, Brazilian poet.
- José María Mendiluce, 64, Spanish politician and author.
- Janez Strnad, 81, Slovene physicist.
- Tomasz Tomczykiewicz, 54, Polish politician, member of Sejm (2001–2015), chronic kidney disease.
- Olene Walker, 85, American politician, Governor (2003–2005) and Lieutenant Governor of Utah (1993–2003).
- Adrian Wright, 68, English-born Australian actor (Freewheelers, Carson's Law, Prisoner).

=== 29 ===
- Claire Aho, 90, Finnish photographer, fire.
- Wayne Bickerton, 74, British songwriter ("Nothing but a Heartache", "Sugar Baby Love"), record producer, and music executive.
- Harold Cagle, 79, American football coach.
- Ramón de los Santos, 66, Dominican baseball player (Houston Astros).
- John Demarie, 70, American football player (Cleveland Browns).
- Ottó Dóra, 53, Hungarian politician, Mayor of Salgótarján (since 2014).
- Joseph F. Girzone, 85, American Catholic priest and author.
- George Hadjinikos, 92, Greek musician.
- Jonathan Janson, 85, British Olympic sailor.
- Vasyl Lishchynskyi, 51, Ukrainian Paralympic athlete.
- Tunku Abdul Malik, 86, Malaysian royal.
- Joe Marston, 89, Australian soccer player (Preston North End) and manager (national team).
- Joachim Carlos Martini, 84, Chilean-born German conductor (Junge Kantorei).
- Christopher Middleton, 89, British poet and translator.
- Buddy Moreno, 103, American musician and radio and television personality.
- Otto Newman, 93, Austrian-born British sociologist.
- Rex Quartey, 71, Ghanaian writer and poet.
- Oʻtkir Sultonov, 76, Uzbek politician, Prime Minister (1995–2003).

=== 30 ===
- Meli Bainimarama, 70, Fijian businessman and permanent secretary.
- Pío Caro Baroja, 87, Spanish director and writer.
- Jack Brizendine, 71, American horse trainer, lung cancer.
- Nigel Buxton, 91, British travel writer.
- André Carbonnelle, 92, Belgian Olympic hockey player.
- Charles Shipley Cox, 93, American oceanographic physicist.
- Jean Deplace, 71, French cellist.
- Bob Dustal, 80, American baseball player (Detroit Tigers).
- Jack Fagan, 82, New Zealand rugby league player.
- Greg Fisk, 70, American politician, Mayor of Juneau, Alaska (2015).
- Jewel Freeman Graham, 90, American educator.
- Minas Hatzisavvas, 67, Greek actor.
- Gerrit Holdijk, 71, Dutch politician, Senator (1986–1987, 1991–2015), lung cancer.
- Sabri Khan, 88, Indian sarangi player.
- Marcus Klingberg, 97, Polish-born Israeli scientist and spy for the Soviet Union.
- Brajraj Mahapatra, 94, Indian monarch, Raja of Tigiria State (1943–1947).
- Fatema Mernissi, 75, Moroccan feminist writer and sociologist.
- Shigeru Mizuki, 93, Japanese manga artist (GeGeGe no Kitarō, Onward Towards Our Noble Deaths, Showa: A History of Japan), heart attack.
- Adolph Plummer, 77, American sprinter.
- Eldar Ryazanov, 88, Russian film director (Carnival Night, The Irony of Fate, Promised Heaven), respiratory and heart failure.
- Steve Shagan, 88, American novelist, screenwriter, and producer (Save the Tiger, Voyage of the Damned, Primal Fear).
- David Simmons, 85, New Zealand ethnologist and historian.
- Renzo Trivelli, 90, Italian politician.
- Leslie Waddington, 81, British art dealer.
