= Faran =

Faran may refer to:

- Faran, Iran, a village
- James J. Faran (1808–1892), American politician
- Naila Faran (1978–2015), Saudi medic

== See also ==
- Faran Tangi, a village in Pakistan
- Farran, a village in Ireland
- Firan language, spoken in Nigeria
