= List of Missouri Western Griffons football seasons =

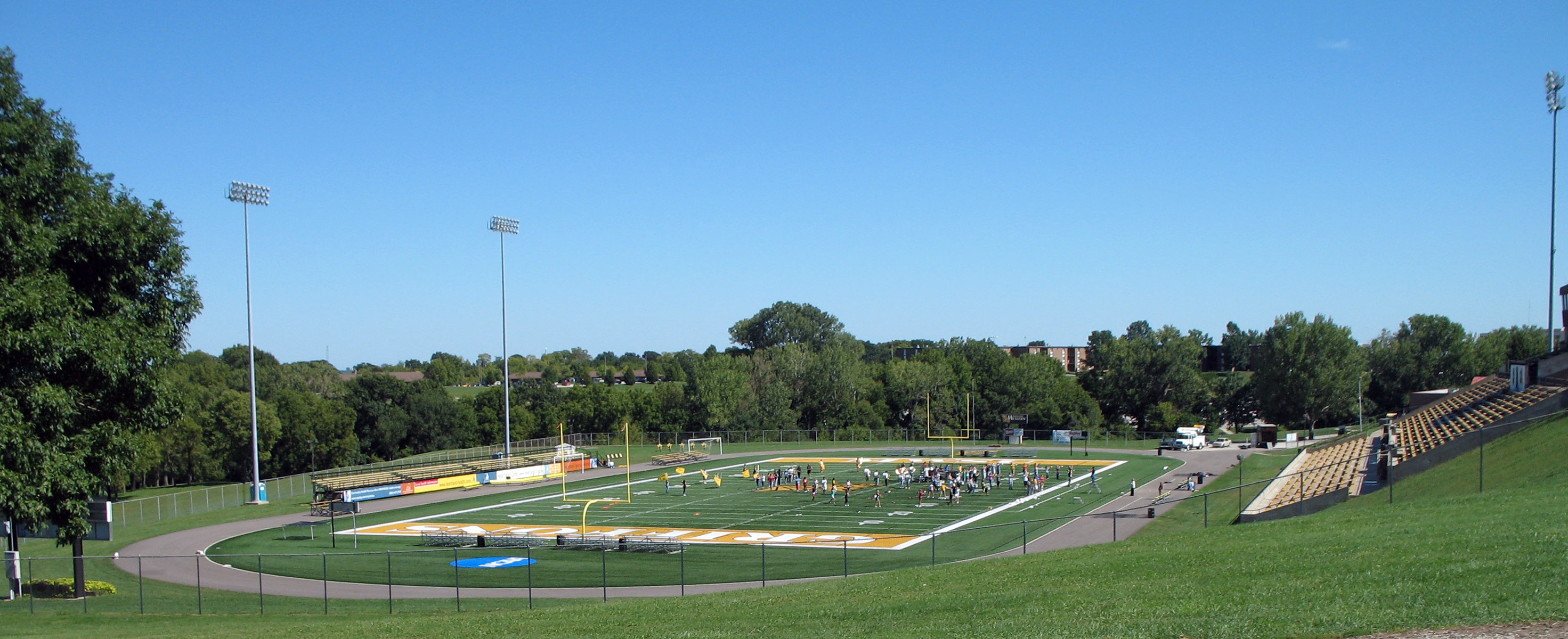
Spratt Stadium, Missouri Western's home field

The Missouri Western Griffons college football team competes as part of the National Collegiate Athletic Association (NCAA) Division II, and represents Missouri Western State University in the Mid-America Intercollegiate Athletics Association (MIAA). The Griffons have played their home games at Spratt Stadium in St. Joseph, Missouri since 1979. Since their inaugural season, Missouri Western has played in 595 games, and as of the 2024 season, it has an all-time record of 323 wins, 263 losses, 9 ties. The Griffons have appeared in twelve bowl games and qualified for the NCAA Division II playoffs four times.

Missouri Western competed as a NAIA independent, unaffiliated with a conference, from 1970 to 1975. It joined the Central States Intercollegiate Conference in 1976. In 1989, the Griffons joined the Missouri Intercollegiate Athletic Association, later renamed the Mid-America Intercollegiate Athletics Association, and the NCAA Division II ranks.

== Seasons ==
National champions †	Conference champions *	Shared standing T

Season	Head coach	Conference	Season results								Postseason	Final ranking	
Season	Head coach	Conference	Overall			Conference					Post Season Result	AFCA Poll	D2fb.com Poll
Season	Head coach	Conference	Wins	Losses	Ties	Wins	Losses	Ties	Conference finish	Division finish	Post Season Result	AFCA Poll	D2fb.com Poll
Missouri Western Griffons
1970	Harold Cagle	Independent	1	8	0	—	—	—	—	—	—	—	—
1971	Harold Cagle	Independent	2	7	0	—	—	—	—	—	—	—	—
1972	Harold Cagle	Independent	3	7	0	—	—	—	—	—	—	—	—
1973	Harold Cagle	Independent	4	5	1	—	—	—	—	—	—	—	—
1974	Rob Hicklin	Independent	3	7	0	—	—	—	—	—	—	—	—
1975	Rob Hicklin	Independent	8	3	1	—	—	—	—	—	Won Mineral Water Bowl against Graceland Yellow Jackets, 44–0	—	—
1976	Rob Hicklin	Independent	4	5	0	—	—	—	—	—	—	—	—
1977	Rob Hicklin	CSIC	8	2	1	4	2	1	—	—	Won Boot Hill Bowl against Benedictine Ravens, 35–30	—	—
1978	Rob Hicklin	CSIC	5	5	0	3	4	0	—	—	—	—	—
1979	Rob Hicklin	CSIC	7	4	0	3	4	0	—	—	Won Moila Shrine Bowl against William Jewell Cardinals, 72–44	—	—
1980	Rob Hicklin	CSIC	5	3	2	3	3	1	—	—	—	—	—
1981	Rob Hicklin	CSIC	8	2	0	5	2	0	—	—	—	—	—
1982	Rob Hicklin	CSIC	5	5	0	3	4	0	—	—	—	—	—
1983	Rob Hicklin	CSIC	5	6	0	3	4	0	—	—	—	—	—
1984	Rob Hicklin	CSIC	4	6	1	4	3	0	—	—	—	—	—
1985	Rob Hicklin	CSIC	3	7	0	2	5	0	—	—	—	—	—
1986	Dennis Darnell	CSIC	3	8	0	2	5	0	—	—	—	—	—
1987	Dennis Darnell	CSIC	2	8	1	0	6	1	—	—	—	—	—
1988	Dennis Darnell	CSIC	5	6	0	2	5	0	—	—	—	—	—
1989	Dennis Darnell	MIAA	7	4	0	5	5	0	T–5th	—	—	—	—
1990	Dennis Darnell	MIAA	2	8	0	2	7	0	T–8th	—	—	—	—
1991	Stan McGarvey	MIAA	4	7	0	2	7	0	9th	—	—	—	—
1992	Stan McGarvey	MIAA	5	6	0	4	5	0	6th	—	—	—	—
1993	Stan McGarvey	MIAA	8	2	1	6	2	1	T–3rd	—	—	—	—
1994	Stan McGarvey	MIAA	8	3	0	6	3	0	T–3rd	—	—	—	—
1995	Stan McGarvey	MIAA	7	3	1	6	3	0	T–2nd	—	—	—	—
1996	Stan McGarvey	MIAA	7	4	—	5	4	—	T–4th	—	—	—	—
1997	Jerry Partridge	MIAA	5	6	—	3	6	—	3rd	—	—	—	—
1998	Jerry Partridge	MIAA	5	6	—	3	6	—	T–6th	—	—	—	—
1999	Jerry Partridge	MIAA	7	4	—	6	3	—	3rd	—	—	—	—
2000	Jerry Partridge	MIAA	8	4	—	8	1	—	2nd	—	Lost Mineral Water Bowl to Winona State Warriors, 43–41	—	—
2001	Jerry Partridge	MIAA	8	3	—	6	3	—	T–3rd	—	—	—	—
2002	Jerry Partridge	MIAA	6	5	—	4	5	—	T–5th	—	—	—	—
2003	Jerry Partridge	MIAA	9	3	—	7	2	—	T–1st	—	Won Mineral Water Bowl against Concordia Golden Bears, 24–14	—	—
2004	Jerry Partridge	MIAA	5	6	—	4	3	—	T–5th	—	—	—	—
2005	Jerry Partridge	MIAA	9	3	—	7	2	—	T–2nd	—	Won Mineral Water Bowl against Concordia Golden Bears, 35–23	25	—
2006	Jerry Partridge	MIAA	9	3	—	7	2	—	T–2nd	—	Lost NCAA First Round to Midwestern State Mustangs, 28–26	16	—
2007	Jerry Partridge	MIAA	9	3	—	6	3	—	T–3rd	—	Won Mineral Water Bowl against Wayne State (NE) Wildcats, 20–13	—	—
2008	Jerry Partridge	MIAA	6	6	—	5	4	—	T–4th	—	Lost Mineral Water Bowl to Augustana (SD) Vikings, 37–16	—	—
2009	Jerry Partridge	MIAA	9	3	—	6	3	—	T–2nd	—	Won Mineral Water Bowl against Augustana (SD) Vikings, 34–21	—	—
2010	Jerry Partridge	MIAA	8	4	—	6	3	—	T–3rd	—	Lost NCAA First Round to Northwest Missouri State Bearcats, 28–24	24	—
2011	Jerry Partridge	MIAA	9	3	—	7	2	—	T–2nd	—	Lost NCAA First Round to Northwest Missouri State Bearcats, 35–29	18	—
2012	Jerry Partridge	MIAA	12	2	—	9	1	—	1st	—	Lost NCAA Quarterfinals to MSU–Mankato Mavericks, 17–10	5	—
2013	Jerry Partridge	MIAA	8	3	—	7	3	—	4th	—	—	RV	—
2014	Jerry Partridge	MIAA	7	4	—	7	4	—	T–4th	—	—	—	—
2015	Jerry Partridge	MIAA	6	5	—	6	5	—	T–5th	—	—	—	—
2016	Jerry Partridge	MIAA	4	7	—	4	7	—	7th	—	—	—	—
2017	Matt Williamson	MIAA	4	7	—	4	7	—	T-8th	—	—	—	—
2018	Matt Williamson	MIAA	7	5	—	6	5	—	6th	—	Won Agent Berry Live United Bowl against Southern Arkansas Muleriders, 30–25	—	—
2019	Matt Williamson	MIAA	9	3	—	8	3	—	T–3rd	—	Won Agent Berry Live United Bowl against Henderson State Reddies, 35–14	RV	—
2020	Matt Williamson	MIAA	No season due to COVID-19 pandemic										
2021	Matt Williamson	MIAA	6	5	—	6	5	—	T–5th	—	—	—	—
2022	Matt Williamson	MIAA	5	6	—	5	6	—	7th	—	—	—	—
2023	Tyler Fenwick	MIAA	8	4	—	7	3	—	T–3rd	—	Lost Live United Bowl against Southern Arkansas Muleriders, 27–43	RV	—
2024	Tyler Fenwick	MIAA	4	7	—	2	7	—	T–8th	—	—	—	—
2025	Tyler Fenwick	MIAA	3	8	—	2	7	—	T–8th	—	—	—	—
Total			315	265	9	—	—	—	(only includes regular season games)				
Total			11	6	0	—	—	—	(only includes playoff and bowl games; 15 appearances, 4 playoff, 11 bowl)				
Total			326	271	9	—	—	—	(all games)				
