= Sipke =

Sipke is a given name. Notable people with the given name include:

- Sipke Castelein (born 1941), Dutch rower
- Sipke Jan Bousema (born 1976), Dutch presenter and actor
- Sipke van der Land (1937–2015), Dutch preacher, writer, teacher and television presenter
- Sipke Zijlstra (born 1985), Dutch track cyclist
