= Vlok =

Vlok is a surname. Notable people with the surname include:

- Adriaan Vlok (1937–2023), South African politician
- David Vlok (born 1963), South African actor and athlete
- Gert Vlok Nel (born 1963), South African poet
- Leon Vlok (1929–2015), South African cricketer
