= Parachute landing fall =

Safety technique

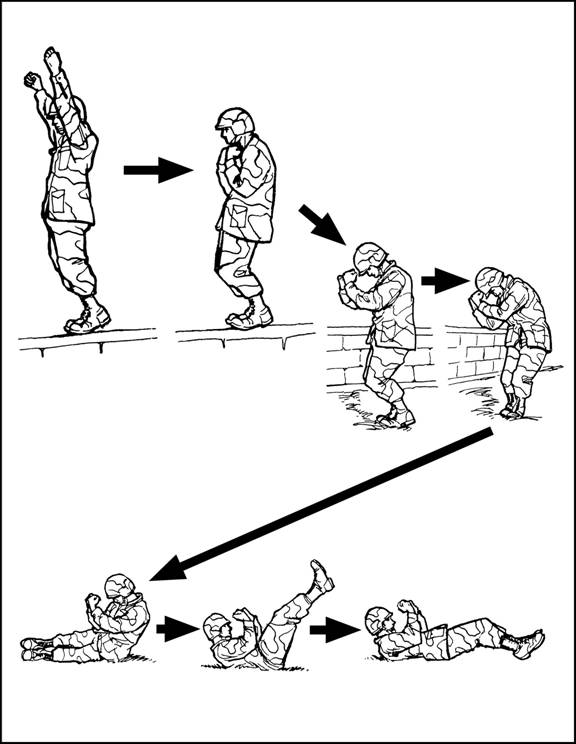
Parachute landing fall practice

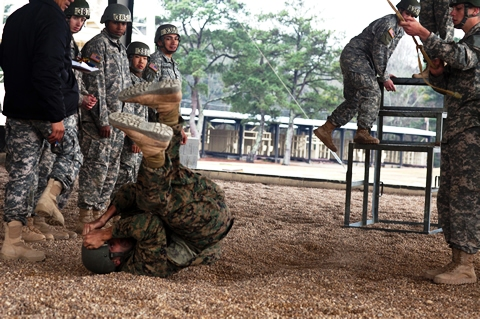
Students practice their PLFs during the first week of U.S. Army Airborne School (a.k.a. "Ground Week")

A parachute landing fall (PLF) is a safety technique that allows a parachutist to land safely and without injury. The technique is performed by paratroopers and recreational parachutists alike. The technique is used to displace the energy of the body contacting the earth at high speeds. The parachutist ideally lands facing the direction of travel with feet and knees together. At the moment first contact is made with the ground, the person goes from an upright position to absorbing the impact by allowing the body to buckle and go toward a horizontal position while rotating toward the side (generally the direction with the dominant directional speed). When executed properly, this technique is capable of allowing a parachutist to survive uninjured during landing speeds that would otherwise cause severe injury or even death.

== Technique ==
While landing under a parachute canopy, the jumper's feet strike the ground first and, immediately, they let their legs collapse, with the body following sideways to distribute the landing shock sequentially along five points of body contact with the ground:

1. the balls of the feet
2. the side of the calf
3. the side of the thigh
4. the side of the hip, or buttocks
5. the side of the back (latissimus dorsi muscle)

During a parachute landing fall, the jumper's legs are slightly bent at the knee, the chin is tucked in, and the parachute risers may be grasped in an arm-bar protecting the face and throat, with the elbows tucked into the sides to prevent injury. Alternatively, the hands can be linked behind the neck with elbows tucked in close.

The fall is executed in one of six directions—left front, left side, left rear, right front, right side, right rear—depending on the jumper's direction of drift, the terrain, wind, and any oscillation of the jumper. With repeated practice by jumping from a shoulder height platform onto the ground or into a sawdust pit, parachutists can learn to make smooth falls automatically, with a reflex action. Experienced jumpers can deploy a parachute landing fall naturally during an accidental, non-parachute related fall; this has reduced or prevented injuries.

The parachute landing fall is most commonly performed by jumpers who are using round canopies. Such parachutes allow less directional control and less lateral- or vertical-speed control than square parachutes. When square canopies are used, experienced jumpers can often land in a standing or short run position at a low vertical speed, so they can remain in a standing position on arriving at the ground. When arriving at greater vertical speed under a round canopy, the parachute landing fall prevents injuries to the feet, ankles, legs, hips, or upper body. However, unsafe landing technique can also cause injury, and paratroopers have elevated risk of cranial injury due to improperly executed parachute landings.

== See also ==
- Landing flare

== Sources ==
- Field Manual No. 3-21.220 (57-220) Static Line Parachuting Techniques and Tactics. U.S. Department of the Army, Washington, DC, 23 September 2003.

== Bibliography ==
- Dan Poynter; Mike Turoff (2003). Parachuting: The Skydiver's Handbook. Para Publishing. p. 68. ISBN 978-1-56860-087-1. "Parachute Landing Falls...A. Prepare to Land...B. Ground contact...C. Follow through"
