= Karl Jaeger =

Karl Jaeger or Karl Jäger may refer to:

- Karl Jäger (1888–1959), Nazi leader and mass murderer
- Karl Jäger (artist) (1833–1887), German painter
- Karl Jaeger (educator) (1930–2015), American educator

== See also ==
- Charles de Jaeger (1911–2000), BBC cameraman
- Charlie Jaeger (1875–1942), Major League Baseball player
- Chuck Yeager (1923–2020), United States Air Force officer and record-setting test pilot
