= Landing flare =

Flying maneuver

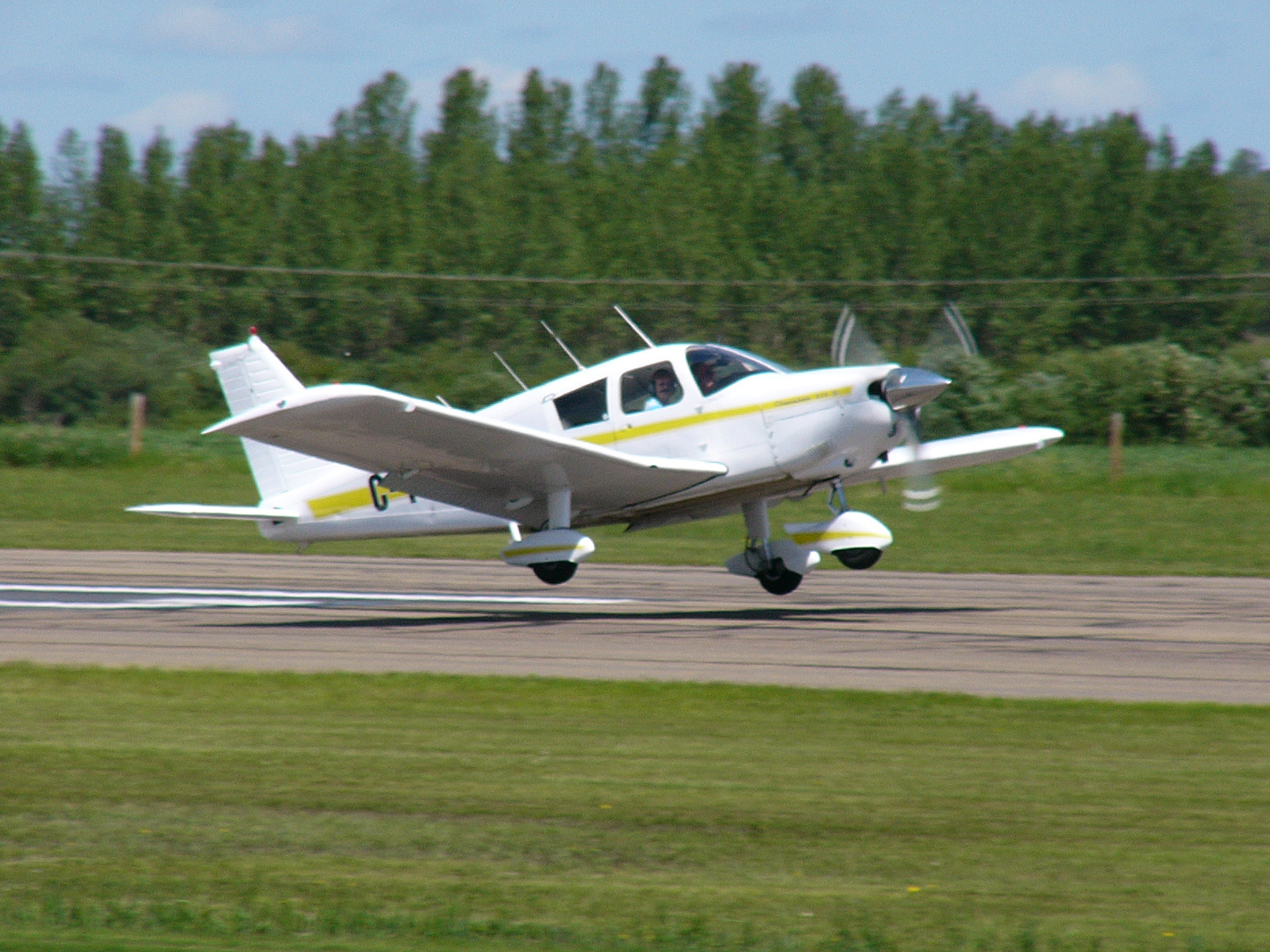
Piper PA-28 Cherokee flaring for landing

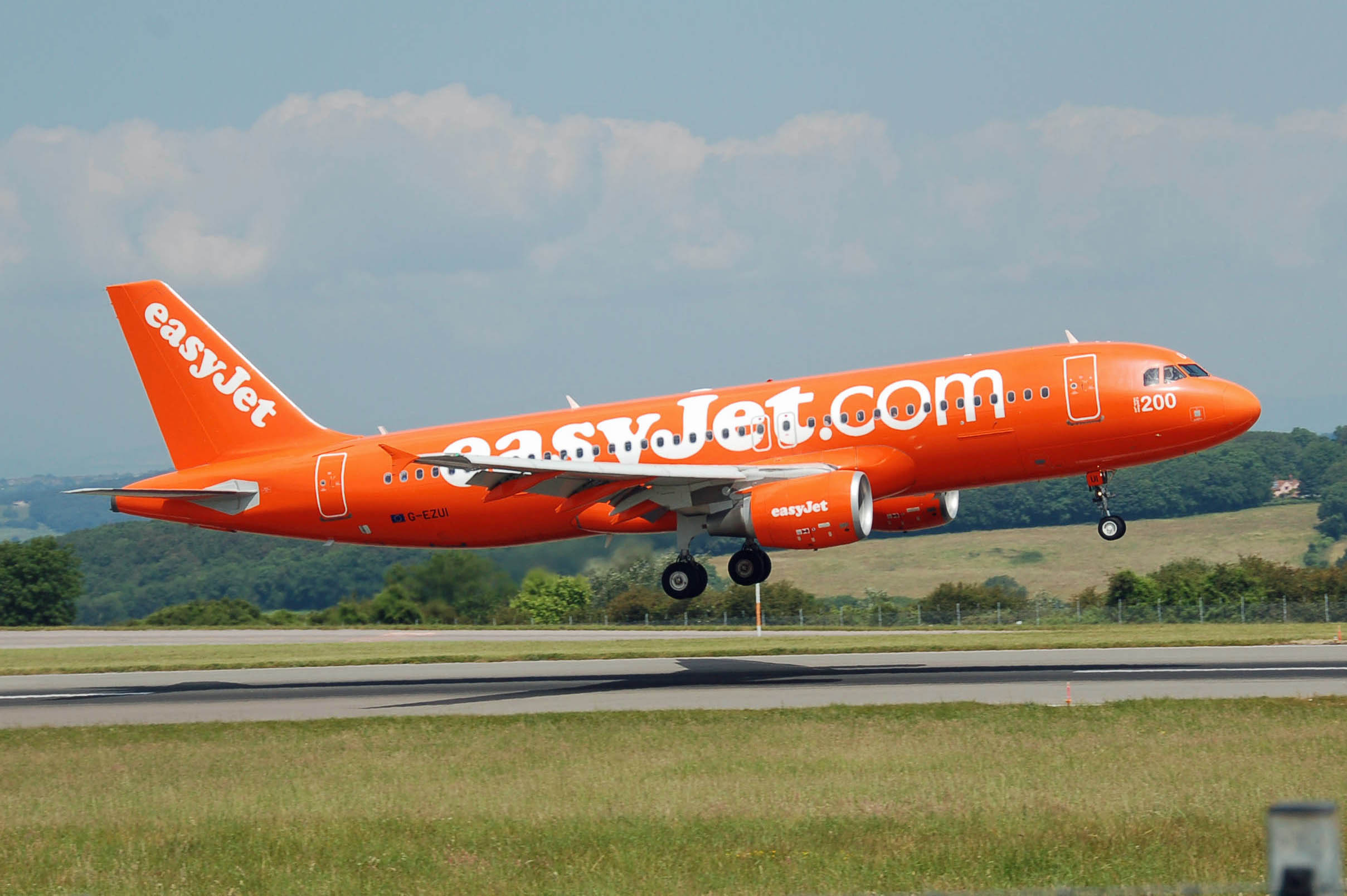
An easyJet Airbus A320 flares at Bristol Airport, England

The landing flare, also referred to as the round out, is a maneuver or stage during the landing of an aircraft. The flare follows the final approach phase, and precedes the touchdown and roll-out phases of landing.

== Aircraft ==
In fixed-wing aircraft performing conventional landing, the flare maneuver involves the plane's nose being raised on approach to the runway, and its wings' angle of attack is increased to create a greater lift coefficient, which allows the plane to maintain sufficient lift while slowing the airspeed and rate of descent to a proper attitude, therefore setting for a softer touchdown. In the case of aircraft with tailwheel landing gears, the attitude is set for touchdown on the main (front) landing gears first. In the case of aircraft with tricycle landing gears, the attitude is set for touchdown on the main (rear) landing gears. In the case of monowheel gear-equipped gliders, the flare consists only of leveling the aircraft.

During a helicopter landing, a flare is used for reducing both vertical and horizontal speed thus allowing a near-zero-speed touchdown.

== Parachuting ==
In parachuting, the flare is the part of the parachute landing immediately preceding ground contact and is executed about 15 feet (5 m) above ground. The purpose of this landing flare, as with aircraft, is to convert forward speed into lift, with the goal of both flattening one's glide angle and thus vertical descent speed, to render touchdown impact as slow and gentle as possible, ideally minimizing the need for a PLF.
