= Wilbur Foss =

American politician and fiddler (1921–2015)

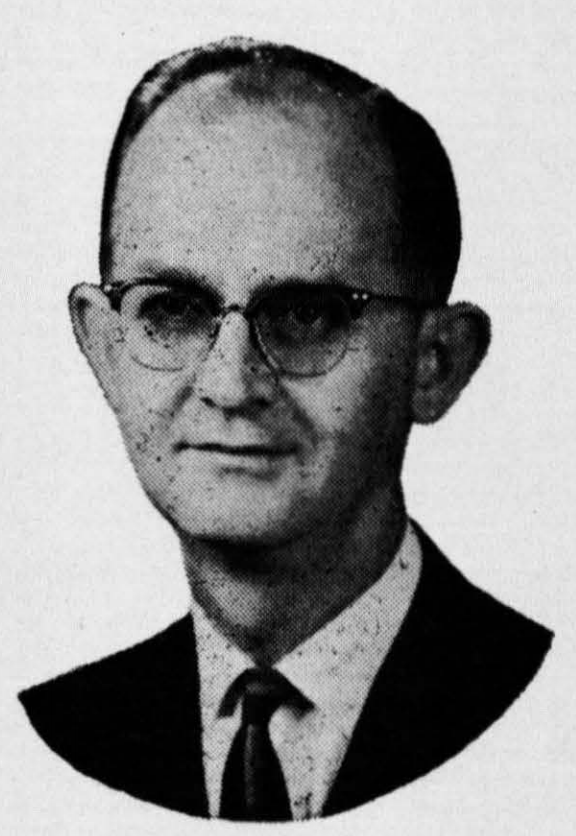

Member of the South Dakota Senate from the 3rd district
- In office 1961–1963

Personal details
- Born: June 15, 1921 Freeman, South Dakota
- Died: November 18, 2015 (aged 94) Scotland, South Dakota
- Party: Republican
- Spouse: Elizabeth
- Occupation: musician, teacher, businessman, banker

Wilbur Peder Foss (June 15, 1921 – November 18, 2015) was an American businessman, educator and musician. He served as a member of the South Dakota Senate from 1961–1963.

== Background ==
Wilbur Peder Foss was born in rural Freeman, South Dakota to Jarle Foss (1894-1992) and Inga (nee Jorstad) Foss (1898-1976). His father was an immigrant from Norway. He attended rural schools and graduated from Menno High School. He earned a degree from the University of South Dakota–Springfield.

== Career ==
His teaching and coaching career included service at a number of South Dakota schools in various locations including Wagner, Lennox, Davis, Beresford. Foss was the owner-operator of the Coast-to-Coast Hardware Store in Scotland, SD (1946-1963). He also played on the local baseball team in Scotland.

He is president of the Valley State Bank (1968-1988) and founder of the South Dakota Old Time Fiddlers Association. Foss was a member of the South Dakota State Senate from 1961 to 1963. He was appointed to the seat representing the 3rd district replace Joe E. Lehmann, who had resigned. He started playing the fiddle in the 1960s while in his 50s, despite lacking 3 fingers, which he lost in a farm accident in his childhood.

In 1989, he was inducted into the South Dakota Hall of Fame. He is also a member of the South Dakota Country Music Hall of Fame (inducted 2011), South Dakota Baseball Hall of Fame (inducted 1984), the South Dakota Fiddlers Hall of Fame (inducted 1984) and the Midwest Fiddler Hall of Fame (inducted 1987). He was awarded the South Dakota Press Association Distinguished Service Award in 1987.

== Personal life ==
In 1946, he married Elizabeth Busch. They lived in Scotland, South Dakota, where he died on November 18, 2015.
