= Faran Tangi =

- Village and union council
- Country: Pakistan
- Region: Balochistan
- District: Ziarat District
- Time zone: UTC+5 (PST)

Faran Tangi is a village and union council of Ziarat District in the Balochistan province of Pakistan.

It lies 10 km from Ziarat, off the main road to Quetta. A small waterfall formed by the mountain spring flows down. It is 2 km walk from the main road to the waterfall, which is a suitable picnic spot.
