= Guy Buckingham =

English aircraft engineer

Guy Buckingham (11 February 1921 – 17 November 2015) was an English aircraft engineer who established the Australian automobile manufacturer Nota in 1952 in Oxford, which he relocated to Australia in 1955. Buckingham employed his expertise in English racing car and aircraft design in the manufacturing of new Australian racing cars. He used aircraft technology to help build triangulated, multi-tubular, space framed racing cars, which had in the past been seen in Australia only as imported automobiles.

Before going to Australia, Buckingham took on the skills he learned in the RAF through aeronautical engineering to build along with a team, a lightweight car to take place in a 6-hour race at Silverstone against the likes of Jaguar, Healey, Aston Martin, etc. and won.

While in Australia, among numerous other car design and manufacture projects, Guy built five Formula Junior class racing cars. The first two are the only Australian-built front engine cars. These still exist and are known as the "89" and "90" cars. The 1959 car won the first FJ race held in Australia at Warwick Farm with Buckingham as the driver. Their history was short, racing through to 1963/4. The 89 car has a continuous history to the present day. The 90 car was never raced from 1964 onwards until it was rebuilt in 2004. They are raced under the historic register HSRCA in Australia as 1959 and 1960 Nota FJ. The third car was rear engined Nota FJ Renault, History unknown. This car was owned by Ian Cook 1970 till 1972 and raced at Oran Park and Amaroo as a Formula 3 and was not that reliable motor wise. Cook then sold it on to Peter Taylor who with Brian Morrow lengthened the chassis by 70 mm to suit Peter's 1850 mm height and fitted it with a Toyota 1198cc engine built by McGrath in Victoria the car went well at Oran Park and Amaroo until Peter sold it on. Peter still has pictures of the car and these may be viewed on auto pics site web year 1973 at Amaroo park Raceway photo by Lance J Rutting. The fourth car is a rear engine FJ with a Ford 105e engine. This is in England at the present time, located near Goodwood race circuit, where it often sees action. The fifth car was a chassis only and this was cut down the middle of the space frame and made into Nota Tace with a Hillman engine and ran in the Clubman series (This being similar in style as the Lotus 7 and super 7 of the era).

Buckingham returned to England in 1971 to carry on with Cars, Clocks & Music but retired from the motorcar race & build industry in the 80's. He retired from playing trumpet in the "Bucks, Berks & Oxon Big Band" and his son, Lee Buckingham's "Big Band Swing" at the age of 88 after minor heart problems and in his words "running out of puff"

Today, Nota continues to produce both road and race cars, namely the F1 and LeMans models, under the management of Buckingham's son, Chris Buckingham.

In 2006 Rod Moore & Bruce Bloodworth published a book entitled "The Nota Files, a marque of two men". It is a detailed book capturing all the details of the Nota car company from the day it was founded up until the present day. (ISBN 0-646-46481-7)

Buckingham had his Biography privately published, covering all his Royal Air Force, Music, Motor Racing and other life exploits.

Buckingham died on 17 November 2015 at the age of 94.
