= Ankie Stork =

Dutch resistance fighter

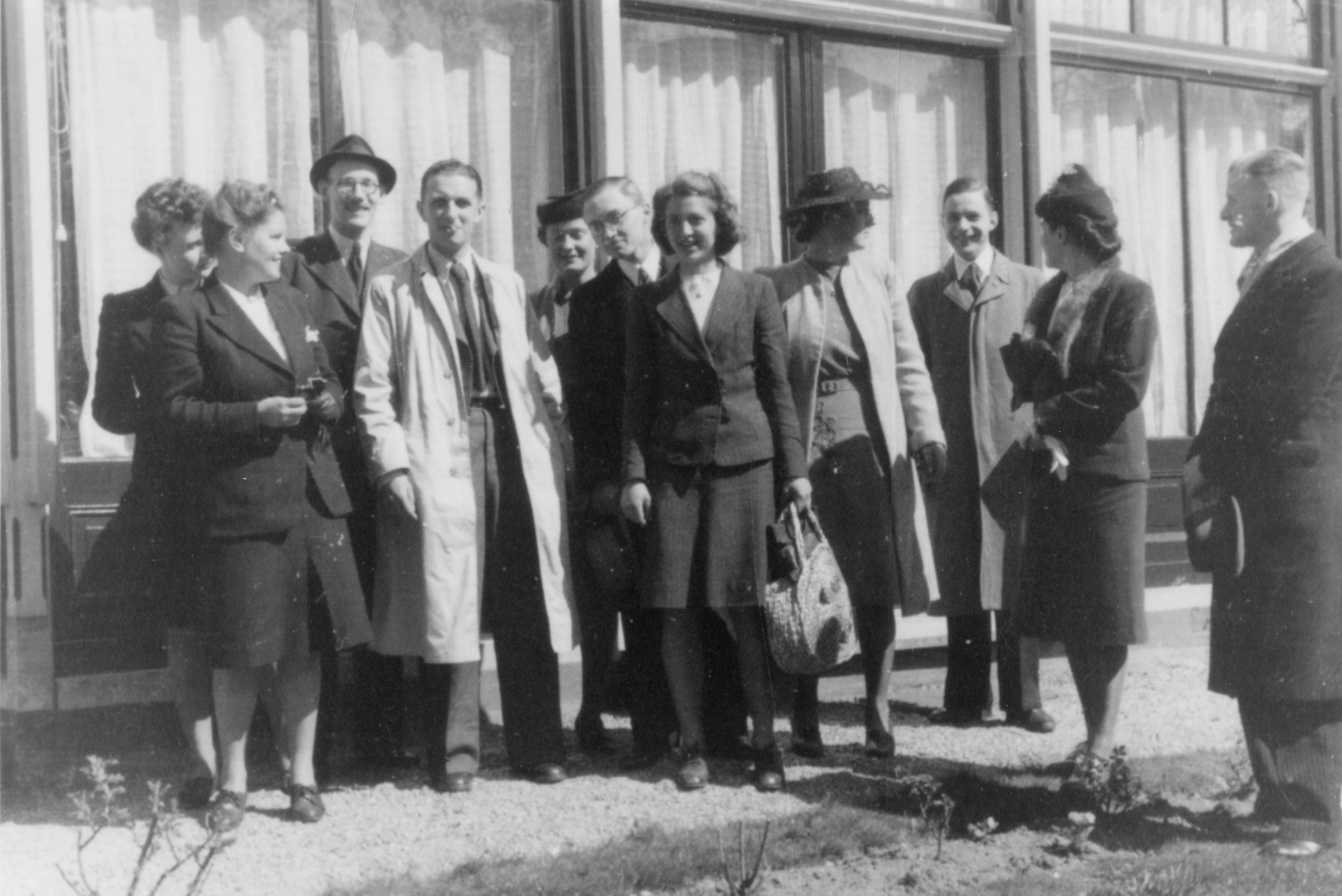
Utrechts Kindercomité

Ankie Stork (c. 1922 – November 23, 2015) was a Dutch resistance fighter during the German occupation of the Netherlands. She is credited with saving thirty-five Jewish children from the Nazis by hiding them around the town of Nijverdal during World War II. Stork acted as part of Utrechts Kindercomité, a Dutch resistance group based in Utrecht. Other prominent members of the group included the publisher, Geert Lubberhuizen.

Stork, a member of the Hengelose manufacturing family, was the daughter of Johan Charles Stork, the director of the Koninklijke Stoombleekerij in Nijverdal.

She became a lecturer and spokesperson after the war. She continued to reside at two residences in Enschede and The Hague until shortly before her death. She died in Enschede on November 23, 2015, at the age of 93.
