= Lindela Ndlovu =

Lindela Rowland Ndlovu
- Died: 18 November 2015
- Citizenship: Zimbabwe
- Education: University of Guelph
- Occupation: biochemist academic
- Employer(s): National University of Science and Technology

Lindela Rowland Ndlovu (died 18 November 2015) was a Zimbabwean biochemist and Vice-Chancellor of the National University of Science and Technology. He was also a founding member of the Zimbabwe Academy of Science and served as the Honorary President of the South African Academy of Animal Science.

He served as a Professor of Animal Science at the University of Limpopo in South Africa, and for nine years was Dean of Faculty of Agriculture at the University of Zimbabwe. He spent several decades in the United States studying animal science. Ndlovu earned his PhD degree in 1985 at the University of Guelph, in Ontario, Canada.

In 1995, Ndlovu helped initiate a research project with J. D. Reed from the University of Wisconsin into the ecological biochemistry of proanthocyanidins. In 2007, he was the recipient of the Gold Medal for Research from the South African Academy for Animal Science.

== Bibliography ==
- Lindela Rowland Ndlovu; Joseph Francis (1997). Performance and Nutritional Management of Draught Cattle in Smallholder Farming in Zimbabwe. University of Zimbabwe Publications. ISBN 978-0-908307-62-3.
- Lindela R. Ndlovu (1991). Goat Development in Zimbabwe: Prospects and Constraints. Department of Animal Science, University of Zimbabwe.

== Death ==
He died suddenly at Gallen House Medical Centre, Bulawayo, on 18 November 2015.
