= Olaf H. Olsen =

Danish historian and archaeologist

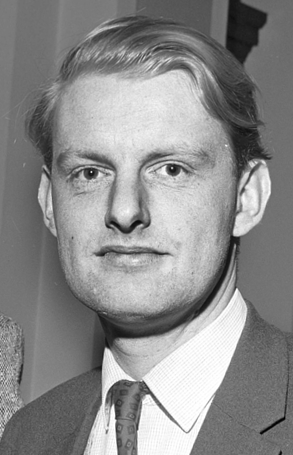
Olaf Heymann Olsen. 1962

Olaf Heymann Olsen (7 June 1928 – 17 November 2015) was a Danish historian and archaeologist. He is known to have primarily worked in medieval and Viking Age archaeology.

Olaf Olsen was born in Copenhagen. He was the son of Albert Olsen (1890-1949) and Agnete E. Bing (1905-90). He became a student in 1946, earned MSc. in history and geography in 1953. In 1966, he received a degree in philosophy at the University of Copenhagen. Olaf Olsen became an assistant at the National Museum of Denmark in Copenhagen in 1950. He became museum superintendent at the National Museum in 1958. He was appointed as a professor of medieval archaeology at Aarhus University in 1971. In 1981, he became director of the National Museum and the Directorate for Cultural Heritage.

During the period 1962-1979, his archaeological work was mainly concentrated on the circular castles of the Viking Age. He has made numerous archaeological excavations in Denmark as well as in Norway and England. Olsen has conducted numerous excavations of medieval churches and was primary in the discovery of the ancient Skuldelev ships.

Olaf Olsen was also editor of Gyldendal and Politikens Danmarkshistorie 1988-91 and chaired the Scientific Council of Den Store Danske Encyklopædi. He received the Rosenkjær Prize (Rosenkjær-Prisen) in 1991. He was a fellow of the Norwegian Academy of Science and Letters from 1989.
