= Ed Boykin =

American politician (1932–2015)

Member of the New Mexico House of Representatives for the 37th district
- In office 2001–2007

Personal details
- Born: William Edward Boykin; June 27, 1932 Clarendon, Texas, U.S.
- Died: November 17, 2015 (aged 83) Las Cruces, New Mexico, U.S.
- Party: Republican
- Education: New Mexico State University
- Profession: teacher, academic administrator

William Edward "Ed" Boykin (June 27, 1932 – November 17, 2015) was an American politician who was a Republican member of the New Mexico House of Representatives from 2001 to 2007. He attended New Mexico State University and was a teacher and academic administrator. Boykin died on November 17, 2015.
