= Steve Wildstrom =

American writer

- Born: July 11, 1947; Detroit, Michigan
- Died: November 24, 2015 (aged 68); Kensington, Maryland
- Occupation: Columnist
- Website: Official site

Stephen Henry Wildstrom (July 11, 1947 – November 24, 2015) was an American technology columnist and a technology consultant.

== Personal life ==
Born in Detroit, Michigan, Wildstrom went to University of Michigan. He died on November 24, 2015, from brain cancer.

== Career ==
He was a technology columnist for Business Week, where his column was called as Technology and You. Steve Wildstrom joined Business Week in 1972. He served in variety of capacities, covering politics, economics, and labor in Washington and Detroit and was also deeply involved in the computerization of editorial operations in the 1980s.

After leaving the magazine following its purchase by Bloomberg he became a freelance journalist, writing for sites such as Techpinions. He suffered a brain tumor.

== Awards ==
- McGraw-Hill Achievement Award
