= Raymond M. MacDonald =

American politician

Member of the Rhode Island House of Representatives
- In office 1970–1978

Personal details
- Born: February 13, 1923
- Died: November 9, 2015 (aged 92)
- Party: Republican

Raymond M. MacDonald (February 13, 1923 – November 9, 2015) was an American politician. He served as a Republican member of the Rhode Island House of Representatives.

== Life and career ==
MacDonald attended Aldrich High School.

MacDonald served in the Rhode Island House of Representatives from 1970 to 1978.

MacDonald died on November 9, 2015, at the age of 92.
