= Punk Lawyer =

Advocaat van de Hanen
- Directed by: Gerrit van Elst
- Written by: Kitty Verrips; Gerrit van Elst
- Produced by: Matthijs van Heijningen
- Starring: Pierre Bokma; Margo Dames; Jaap Spijkers
- Cinematography: Lex Wertwijn
- Edited by: Mario Steenbergen
- Music by: Paul M. van Brugge
- Production companies: Sigma Pictures; VARA
- Distributed by: Concorde Film
- Release date: 9 May 1996
- Running time: 109 minutes
- Country: Netherlands
- Language: Dutch

Punk Lawyer or Advocaat van de Hanen is a 1996 Dutch film directed by Gerrit van Elst. The film is based on the novel Advocaat van de Hanen by Dutch writer A.F.Th. van der Heijden.

== Cast ==
- Pierre Bokma as Mr. Ernst Quispel
- Margo Dames as Zwanet
- Jaap Spijkers as Frank
- Peter Oosthoek as Quispel Sr.
- Yoka Berretty as Moeder Quispel
- Roos Ouwehand as Roxanne
- Marcel Hensema as Pixley
- André Arend van de Noord as Kraker Kiliaan Noppen
- Johan Simons as Vader Noppen
- Beppie Melissen as Moeder Noppen
- Daniella Remmers as Francine
- Titus Muizelaar as De Moei
- Hans Kesting as Hanekroot
- Hans Croiset as Dr. Rollema
- Hans Karsenbarg as Officier van Justitie
