= Rex Quartey =

Ghanaian writer

- Born: 6 May 1944; Accra
- Died: 29 November 2015 (aged 71)
- Occupation: Writer
- Known for: president of the Ghana Association of Writers

Rexford Quartey was a Ghanaian writer and poet. He served as the president of the Ghana Association of Writers, and also the public relations officer of the SIC Insurance Company.

== Early life and education ==
Quartey was born on 6 May 1944 in Accra. He studied at the Accra Academy from 1959 to 1963, and proceeded to the University of Cape Coast (then the University College of Cape Coast), where he studied Mathematics, Physics and Education from 1966 to 1968. While at the university, he was the president of the university's Students' Christian Union in 1967.

== Career ==
While at the university, Quartey was a founding member of the Writers' Club. Following his studies at the University College of Cape Coast, Quartey was attached to the Ministry of Health as a publisher from 1968 to 1969. In 1969, he joined the Benefits section of the Social Security Administration compiling statistics. He remained in this capacity until 1972 when he was attached to the life department of the SIC Insurance Company (then State Insurance Corporation).

He was once the Organising Secretary, later Treasurer, and later President of the National Association of Writers. He was also the regional Organiser of the Writers and Poets Association, Greater Accra.

His poems were published in the Tear-Gas magazine, and the local weekly Radio and TV Times. Some of his works were also broadcast over Radio Ghana External Services. Some of his works have also featured in the African Voices, Our Souls Harvest, Ancestral Desires (Collection of Poems), The Midnight Ordeal (play), and Son of the Sea-God (stories).

Aside writing, he was an insurer. He was the Secretary of the SIC local union in 1974, and later, the public relations officer of the company. He served as the Executive Secretary and Chief Administrator of the Ghana Association of Writers until 2010. He was also the Ghana Association of Writers representative at the National Media Commission, and a founding member and board member of CopyGhana; a body that advocated for the rights of publishers in Ghana.

== Honours ==
He was the recipient of the 1st prize for African Studies, in the All Africa competition at the University of California in 1970.

== Personal life ==
Quartey married Mavis Quenu in 1976. As at 1979, they had a daughter. He died on 29 November 2015, and was buried on 27 February 2016.

His hobbies included; playing tennis, listening to classical and modern music, and writing.
