= Ruth Giddings =

Irish bridge player

Giddings on her 100th birthday

Ruth Giddings (born Wellwood 3 September 1911 – 20 November 2015) was an Irish bridge player. She had a long career that included winning 54 national titles, leading her to become one of the best Irish players of contract bridge of her time.

== Biography ==
Giddings was born in Cork on 3 September 1911. She graduated from Alexandra College and went on to work in Bank of Ireland. She started playing contract bridge in her mid-thirties. Giddings died 20 November 2015, aged 104. The Irish Times called her "one of the greatest Irish players of all time." According to the Contract Bridge Association of Ireland, she was "Unquestionably Ireland's greatest woman player." She is currently the most-capped Irish player of all time.

== Career ==
Giddings won 54 national titles starting in 1947 and eventually became a bridge grand master. She played in 19 European, 6 World, 3 European Union, and 2 Home-International championships. She won 5 European medals including 2 silver at Montreux in 1954 and Ostend in 1973. She also won 3 bronze European medals in Dublin in 1952, Torquay in 1961 and Beirut in 1962. She retired from international competition in 1981 when 70 years old but continued to compete in national events and won her last title in 1992. At age 96, she won the president's prize, playing at the Regent.
