= Neville Lakay =

South African cricketer (1938–2015)

Personal information
- Born: 27 October 1938; Cape Town, South Africa
- Died: 2 November 2015 (aged 77); Cape Town, South Africa
- Source: Cricinfo, 23 March 2016

Neville Lakay (27 October 1938 – 2 November 2015) was a South African cricketer. He played one first-class match for Western Province in 1971/72.
