= John Pashley =

- Born: John James Pashley; 31 August 1933 Manly, New South Wales
- Died: 6 November 2015 (aged 82)

Rugby union career
- Position: flanker
International career
Years	Team	Apps	(Points)
1954–58	Wallabies	5	(0)

John James Pashley (31 August 1933 – 6 November 2015) was a rugby union player who represented Australia.

Pashley, a flanker, was born in Manly, New South Wales and claimed a total of 5 international rugby caps for Australia.

Pashley died on 6 November 2015, at the age of 82.
