= Jacob Highland =

American volleyball player (1932–2015)

Jacob "Jake" Alapaki Highland (February 23, 1932 – November 23, 2015) was an American former volleyball player who competed in the 1964 Summer Olympics. He was born in Honolulu, Territory of Hawaii.
