= Humza Al-Hafeez =

American Islamic activist (1931–2015)

Humza al-Hafeez
- Born: Leonard Ernest Weir; February 28, 1931; Harlem, New York, U.S.
- Died: November 27, 2015 (aged 84); Brooklyn, New York, U.S.
- Police career
- Department: New York City Police Department
- Service years: 1959–1976
- Rank: Detective

Humza al-Hafeez (born Leonard Ernest Weir; February 28, 1931 – November 27, 2015, and formerly known as Leonard 12X Weir) was an American Islamic minister, author, and social activist. He was the first Black Muslim police officer in the New York Police Department (NYPD).

In the late 1950s, al-Hafeez founded and served as president of the National Society of Afro-American Policemen, an organization that sought to improve work conditions for Black law enforcement officers, expand employment opportunities, and strengthen relationships between the NYPD and members of the Black and Muslim communities.

Over the course of al-Hafeez's career, he received numerous commendations and awards, including citations for outstanding community service.

== Personal life ==
Born in Harlem, New York, to Asa Moss Weir, a West Indian immigrant (Jamaica, West Indies) and Rosa May Danielson of mixed Caribbean ancestry (Dominican Republic and St. Croix, Virgin Islands), Weir attended New York City public schools where he demonstrated an early aptitude for history and politics. The demands of his young life forced him to quit high school in his early years of enrollment. Yet, as a drop-out, his proclivity for service was fueled amidst an environment that was often biased against minority youth. In 1957, he took the City of New York Police exam and passed. However, to qualify for an appointment, a high school or general equivalency diploma was required. He arranged to take the General Educational Development examination in Manhattan, at Washington Irving High School. He earned a passing score, was awarded a diploma, and entered the NYPD in February 1959, where he sought to improve work conditions for black-uniformed officers. and the community at large. Over the course of his employment, he worked as an undercover special investigator for the U.S. Drug Enforcement Administration and as Special Investigator for the Knapp Commission where he investigated corruption in the NYPD.

In the early 1970s, he joined the Nation of Islam, Temple #7, headquartered in Harlem, and in 1975, he changed his name to Humza al-Hafeez. His first book, Some Things to Think About, was based on his experiences coming of age during the 1940s and 50s, his acceptance of Islam, and his advocacy as a law enforcement officer in the 1970s.

== Public service ==
As a literary activist and social entrepreneur, al-Hafeez worked in the publishing industry and also served as Editor-in-Chief of Muhammad Speaks newspaper. Within his lifetime, he lectured at many universities and institutes of learning around the country, including: New York University, Princeton University, Pace College, University of Chicago, Thomas Jefferson High School, Wallkill Correctional Facility, Green Haven Correctional Facility, Fishkill Correctional Facility, Arthur Kill Correctional Facility, United States Penitentiary at: Ray Brook, New York, Terre Harute, Indiana, and Lewisburg, Pennsylvania.

== Retirement ==
Following a long history of advocacy for disenfranchised communities, al-Hafeez's employment with the NYPD came to an end in March 1976. But his legacy as "a good cop" continued well past his prime, spurring a new generation of leaders to cite his example as a model for success while crediting his groundbreaking work as the underpinnings of similar groups across the nation.

== Death ==
al-Hafeez died on November 27, 2015, at his home in Brooklyn, New York, at the age of 84. He was predeceased by one son, Habib Al-Zaid, and was survived by five other sons, Rasul Hafeez, Bismillah Abdul-Hafeez, Yuhanna Hafeez, Larry Weir, Don Ibn Hafeez, and three daughters, Rosemarie Weir, Mariama Tene Williams, and Jackye Maxey.

== Funeral ==
al-Hafeez's funeral service was held at Muhammad Temple #7C in Brooklyn, New York, on the morning of December 3, 2015. Several hundred of his family and friends gathered to pay respects. Resident Imam Adib Rashid officiated the service. A special tribute was written and performed by literary artist Dr. Deatema L. Abdul-Latif."

== Featured in ==
- Abel, Roger L. (2006). The Black Shields, p. 418, AuthorHouse, Bloomington, Indiana, ISBN 1420844598.
- Armstrong, Michael F. (2012). They Wished They Were Honest: the Knapp Commission and New York City Police Corruption, New York: Columbia University Press, ISBN 9780231153546.
- Darien, Andrew T. (2013). Becoming New York's Finest: Race, Gender, and Integration of the NYPD, 1935-1980. New York: Palgrave Macmillan, ISBN 9781137321930.
- Thompson, Cordell S. (1970, February 26). Don’t Criticize the Police Department, Jet Magazine, p. 17.
