= Larry Powers =

American bodybuilder

Lawrence Cianchetta (1939 – November 26, 2015), known professionally as Larry Powers, was a bodybuilder. He won Mr. New York State in 1965; Mr. Staten Island; Mr. World's Fair; and Mr. America (Class A).

Powers acted in films and television and did several commercials. He appeared on the shows Jackie Gleason Show, Merv Griffin Show, and The Tonight Show Starring Johnny Carson. He was also in movies such as Me, Natalie.

He contracted Parkinson's disease.
