= Eric Gunderson (psychologist) =

Ellsworth K. Eric Gunderson, Ph.D. (September 18, 1923 – November 10, 2015) was a psychologist who has studied human adaptation to living and working under the conditions associated with isolation and confinement. He is an important contributor to the field of Antarctic psychology.

While serving as the director of the United States Navy's research program at the Naval Health Research Center in San Diego in the 1960s, Gunderson developed a research program to study human adaptation in polar environments. One of the main objectives of the research was to develop criteria for the selection of Antarctic personnel. The studies were also concerned with the development of performance criteria and other psychological data related to the stresses of living and working in the extreme, isolated Antarctic environment. Gunderson's studies evaluated more than one thousand personnel, including naval and civilian subjects, who had wintered-over in the Antarctic. Gunderson and his colleagues retrieved data from site visits, personality assessments, peer reviews, and biographical information. Gunderson's research revealed living for several months in the extreme field conditions of the Antarctic can lead to moderate psychological dysfunction in some subjects.

Gunderson experienced the consequences of the harsh Antarctic environment personally during one of his research trips. While visiting the South Pole in the 1960s, extreme weather at 9000 feet (2700 m) above sea level (sub-zero temperatures, 40 mile per hour {64 km/h} wind, and zero visibility) led Gunderson to develop altitude sickness.

Gunderson's research of psychological screening predictors for winter-over personnel in the Antarctica spans a period of over thirty years. Gunderson and his colleagues have used the results from these Antarctic studies to publish more than fifty reports.

NASA has applied some of Gunderson's research to space exploration and used the results to help with development of training programs and psychological evaluations for flight crews of long-duration space missions, in particular to study missions to Mars. The studies done by Gunderson and his colleagues at early Antarctic research stations were particularly relevant to behavior and performance on long-duration spaceflights because the harsh, extreme conditions found at the early Antarctic research stations were similar to those conditions expected to be found during space exploration. Data from these studies has been used in developing screening criteria for selection of personnel for long-duration missions in space.
