= Jack Brizendine =

American horseman and professional trainer

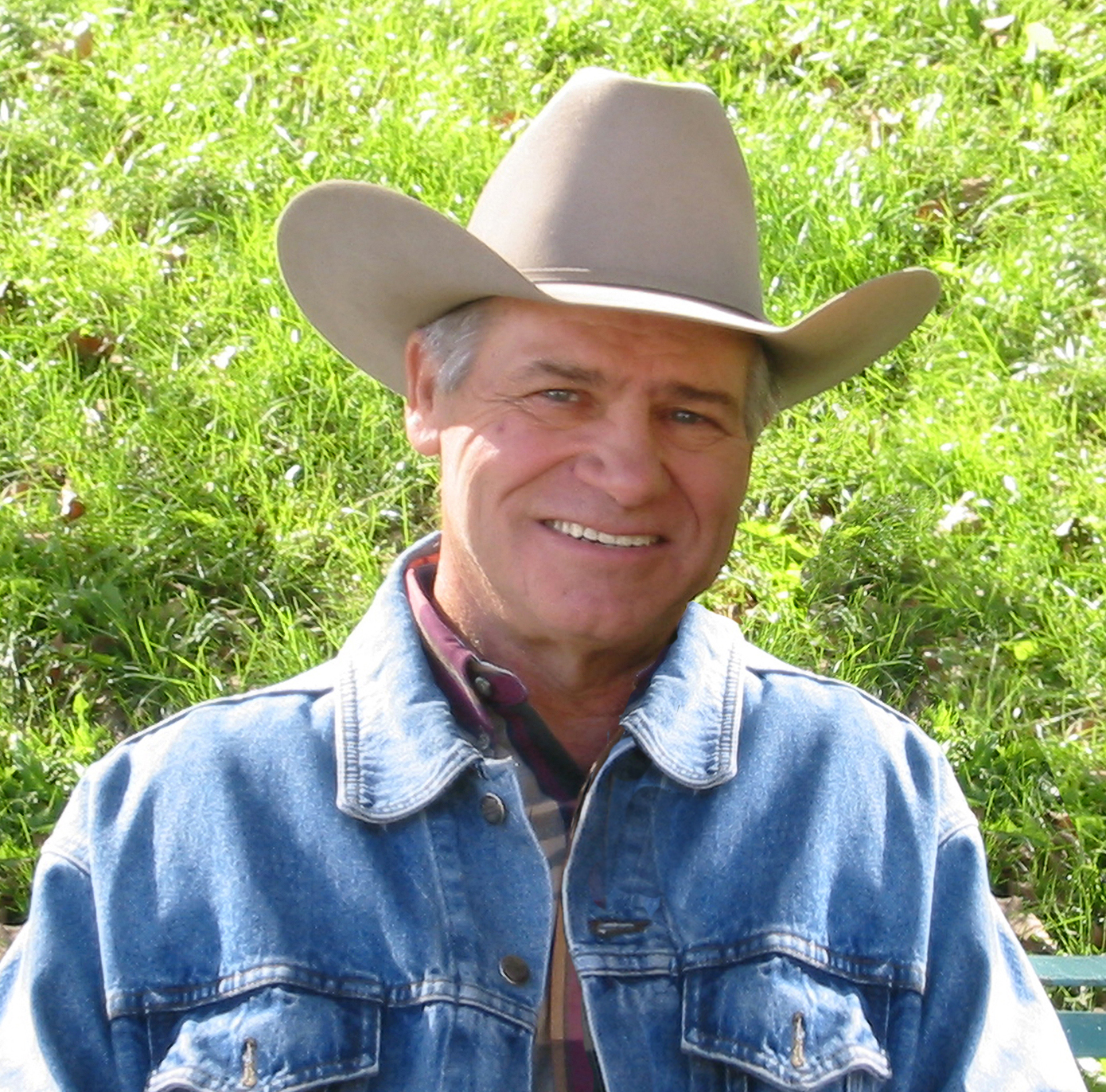
- Jack Brizendine
- Born: January 8, 1944; Bugtussle, Oklahoma
- Died: November 30, 2015 (aged 71); Rocklin, California
- Education: University of California, Berkeley
- Occupation: Quarter Horse trainer
- Spouse: Pamela
- Children: 4

Jack David Brizendine (January 8, 1944 – November 30, 2015) was an American horseman and professional trainer of American Quarter Horses, most notable for having earned 7 world champion titles in 3 different breed associations, and also for having trained or sold 22 world champions. A member of the American Quarter Horse Association, Brizendine began his horse show career competing in stock horse competitions and arena performance events including working cow horse, reining, western riding and western pleasure. He trained horses on his ranch in Lincoln, California.

== Career ==
Jack Brizendine's participation in AQHA events began in 1971, although he did show in other breed association competitions. Brizendine's specialty was halter horse competition for which he earned several AQHA World Champion titles, most notably for My Tru Luv, Classic Edition, and Interception. He was also a Quarter Horse breeder, and trained and exhibited horses in various disciplines including working cow horse, reining, western riding and western pleasure. He was a member of Team Wrangler, an educational outreach program focused on the horse industry; a cooperative endeavor between Wrangler and AQHA.

AQHA's exhibitor point records, which began in 1994, show Brizendine with an all-time point total of 9,830 and 7,150 wins. In 2014, he was presented with a lifetime achievement award presented by the AQHA Professional Horsemen's Council.

== Hall of Fame ==
On November 17, 2016, Jack Brizendine was inducted into the World Conformation Horse Association Hall of Fame along with Larry Sullivant and J.T. Walters.

== Death ==
On November 30, 2015, Jack Brizendine died in Rocklin, California, three-years after being diagnosed with lung cancer.
