= János Herbst =

Hungarian footballer and politician

Member of the National Assembly
- In office 18 June 1998 – 14 May 2002

Personal details
- Born: 8 August 1956 Pécs, Hungary
- Died: 19 November 2015 (aged 59)
- Party: Fidesz (1990–2015)
- Profession: footballer, politician

János Herbst (8 August 1956 – 19 November 2015) was a Hungarian politician, who was a Member of Parliament (MP) from the Tolna County Regional List of Fidesz between 1998 and 2002. He worked in the Committee on Tourism and its two subcommittees during that time.

He joined Fidesz in 1990. He was a representative in the Dombóvár local government from 1990 to 1994. He presided over his party's branch in Dombóvár between 1994 and 1999. He failed to seat a mandate in the 2002 parliamentary election. After that he worked again in the representative body of Dombóvár until 2006.

He was also a former professional footballer in his youth who played for Pécsi VSK based in Pécs. On 14 June 1980, he made his debut and only appearance in the Hungarian first division against Dunaújváros FC.

Herbst died suddenly on 19 November 2015, aged 59.

== Sources ==
- "Herbst János". In MTI Ki kicsoda 2009 (ed. Hermann, Péter). Budapest, Magyar Távirati Iroda, 2008. p. 451.
