= Nota =

Australian automobile manufacturer

Nota Sports and Racing Cars
- Industry: Automotive
- Founded: 1952
- Founder: Guy Buckinham
- Headquarters: Australia
- Products: Sports and racing cars
- Website: www.notasportscars.com

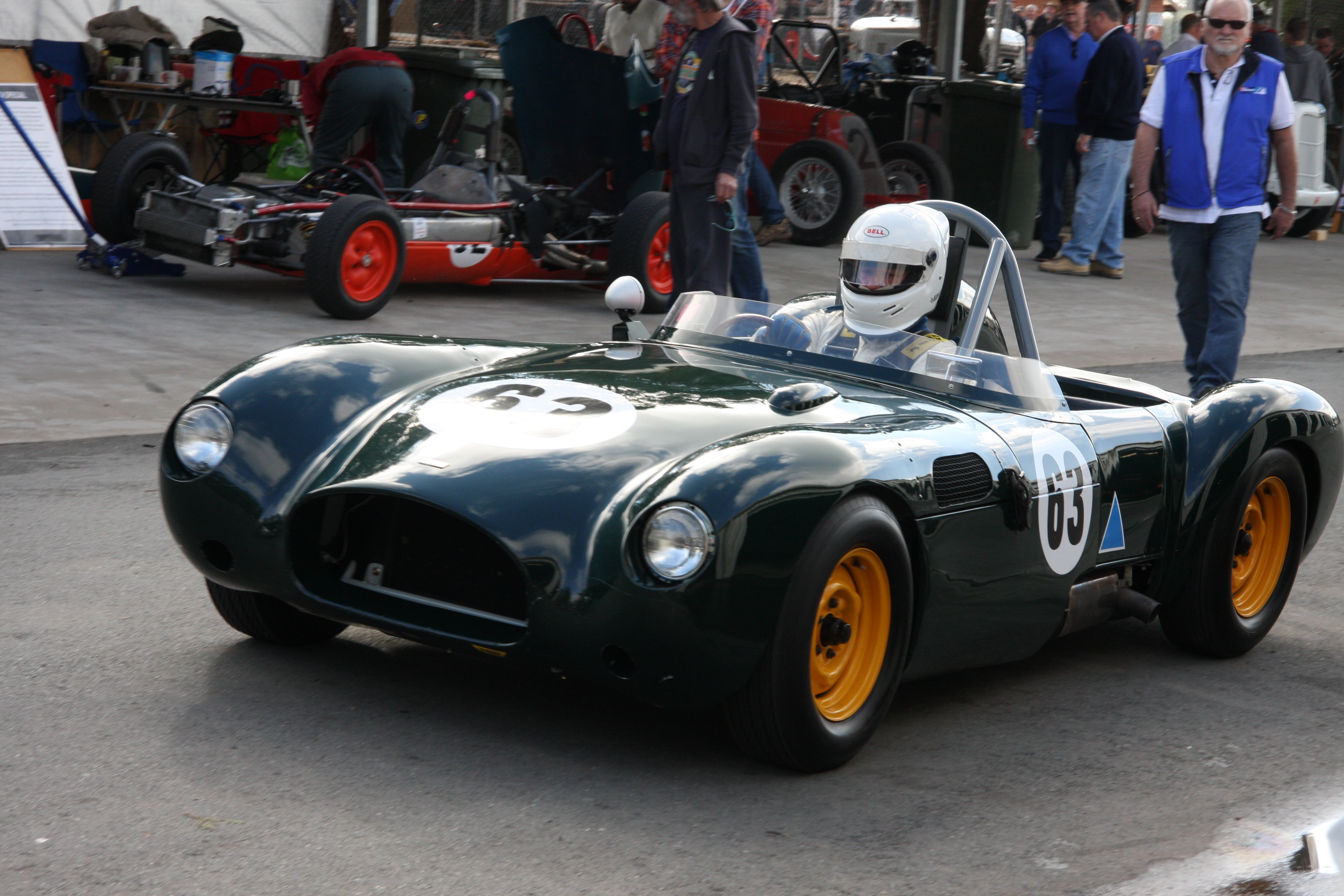
1958 Nota Minx Streamliner

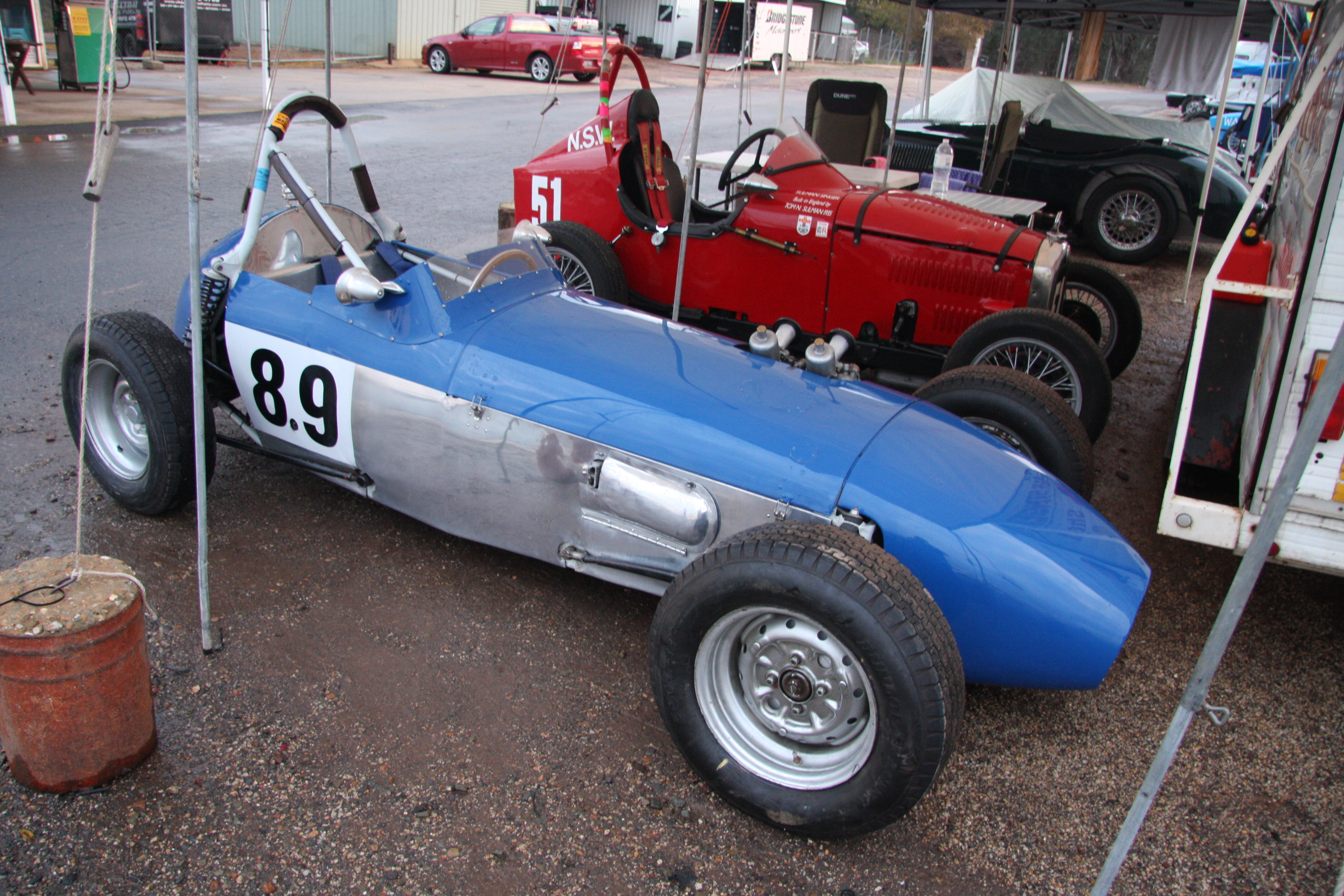
1960 Nota Formula Junior

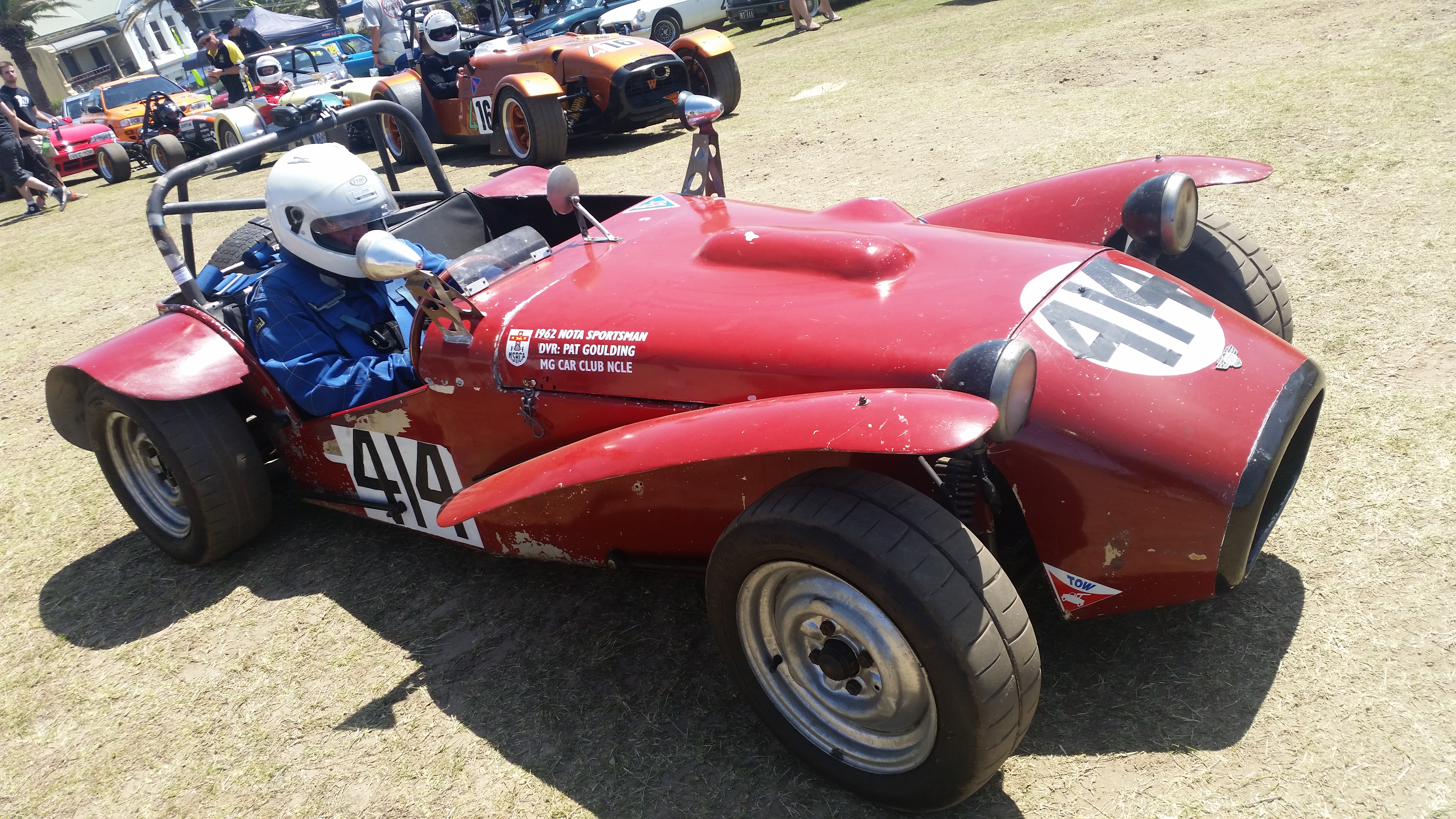
1962 Nota Sportsman

Nota Sports and Racing Cars is an automobile manufacturer in Australia that was established in 1952. Their best-selling car was the Nota Fang, with 105 cars built between 1968 and 1975.

== History ==
The company was founded by Guy Buckingham in 1952. He was an aircraft engineer and used his expertise to build triangulated spaceframed sportscars. Possibly Australia's first space-framed cars. In 1958 the company built a series of all-enveloping aluminium streamlined sports cars. First called "Streamliners", and later called "Mazengarbs". Up to 1960 eleven of those were made. In the late 1950s the company produced Formula Junior cars in both front and mid-engined formats. Nota also made a series of specialist monoposto racing cars for the track and hill climbing events. In 1963 the company made a series of Mini powered sports cars. In 1964 they started production of the Nota Sapphire, an alloy bodied sports and coupe designs with Ford Fiat and Coventry Climax engines. In 1965 Nota started producing Formula Vee cars for Warwick Farm race track making 34 in the first year. In the 1960s the company formulated their "Sportsman", a Lotus 7 lookalike, which they still build today and are now building in a mid-engined version for the modern day transverse engines which the major car manufacturers produce. In 1968 came the Nota Fang Chris Buckinghams first real design, a midengined sports car using a Cooper S engine power plant behind the driver but in front of the rear wheels, their most successful model with over 100 being made. Later the Fang was equipped with Lancia engines, then Toyota engines, finally being fitted with Toyota's V6 Quad cam supercharged engines with over 400BHP. In 1973 Nota started with their Marauder range of cars using the same mechanicals as the Nota Fang. At the same time they were making the Nota Levanti front engine twin cam coupe. In 1975 the supply of Leyland 1275 GT engines started to run out so Nota contacted FIAT and both Marauders and Fangs were made with the 2-litre twin cam FIAT/Lancia engine. Leyland were then approached and the P76 engine was fitted to the Marauders using a Nota made gearbox trans-axle with the gear box next to the driver and the engine behind.

In the late 1970s Nota had started on 4WD 351 V8 mid-engined Marauders, but in the 1980s Ford stopped export of the 351 engine to Australia. After a trip to England Chris Buckingham assembled a design team to design a Fang with Fl 3 litre V6 quad cam engine as well as a fully enclosed, similarly specified Chimera. In 2003 Nota developed the Nota Le Mans, powered by either a Suzuki GTi 1300 cc or 1100 cc motor cycle engine. For road use it could also use a Toyota 1800 cc VVTi 6-speed or the 3.5-litre V6 quad cam. By 2012 Nota had decided that due to the lack of front engine rear wheel drive 4 cylinder engine being available they would use an existing front-engined Nota clubman chassis and move the seats forward by 150mm and fit a transverse engine behind the driver. It looks just like their front-engined clubmans but with the advantage of a mid-engined design.

== Models ==
=== Older models ===
- Nota FJ (Formula Junior)
- Nota Major
- Nota Sapphire
- Nota Fang
- Nota Formula Vee
- Nota Consul
- Nota Streamliner (Mazengarbs)

=== Current models ===
- Nota Le Mans
- Nota F1
- Nota Fang
- Nota Sportsman
- Nota Chimera
