= Jan Monrad =

Jan Monrad (18 March 1951 – 20 November 2015) was a Danish comedian, singer, and entertainer who was best known as part of the duo Monrad & Rislund. The other member was Søren Rislund. Monrad was originally trained by a primary school teacher and was taught music and social studies. He made his debut in show business in early 1970, where he performed in Copenhagen. He released his first single, "Kød på bordet" in 1974. The following year he formed with Søren Rislund and the group Totalpetroleum. Rislund and Monrad had met in 1st grade at Frederiksberg School. The two developed their own special dark witticism, bad jokes, and satire and later changed the group's name Monrad & Rislund. For several years, he was associated with Ekstra Bladet as a TV reviewer, satirical commentator, and traffic reporter, while he has also appeared in several television programs, including Poul Thomsens Hund og Hund.

In 1990, he starred in the feature film Bananen - skræl den før din nabo. In 2009, Monrad debuted doing humorous accounts inspired by Storm P with the film Pølsesnak, in which living sausages appear in an unfiltered parallel universe with people. In 2010, he debuted as a soloist at Odsherred Teater with the critically acclaimed performance Må jeg være fri. He released Dejlige Destinationer and even a book: Pølsesnak 2. He was married Marianne Monrad in 1990, whom he had five children with. During the time of his death, they lived in Holbaek, Northwest Zealand, Denmark.

Monrad died Friday, 20 November 2015, of a sudden blood clot in the lungs.
