= Yoka Berretty =

Dutch actress

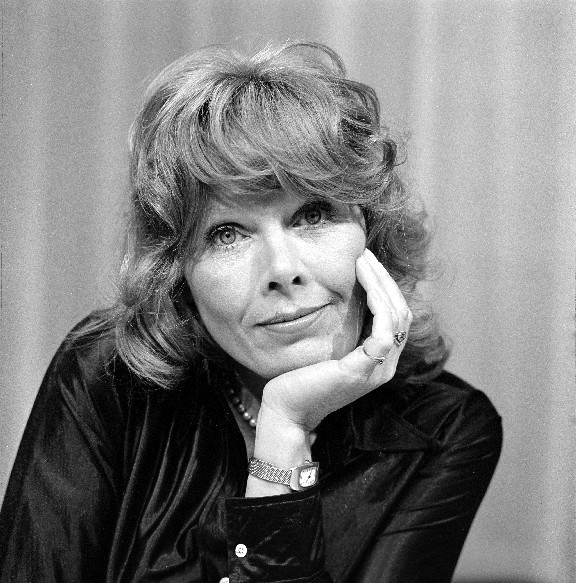
- Yoka Berretty in 1974
- Born: Johanna Ernstina Petrusa Meijeringh; 8 May 1928; Rotterdam, Netherlands
- Died: 28 November 2015 (aged 87)
- Occupation: Actress
- Years active: 1954-2000

Yoka Berretty (8 May 1928 – 28 November 2015) was a Dutch actress. She appeared in more than 30 films and television shows between 1954 and 2000.

== Selected filmography ==
- Scandal in Sorrento (Original title: Pane, amore e...) (1955)
- The Band of Honest Men (1956)
- Makkers Staakt uw Wild Geraas (1960)
- The Last Chapter (1961)
- The Silent Raid (1962)
- Charlotte (1981)
- Punk Lawyer (1996)
