= Thomas S. Marvel =

American architect

Thomas S. Marvel (1935–2015) was an American architect.

== Life ==
Born on March 15, 1935, in Newburgh, New York, Marvel grew up in Washingtonville. He earned a bachelor's degree from Dartmouth College in 1956 and attended the Graduate School of Design at Harvard University. In 1958, he left Harvard to work with R. Buckminster Fuller, his uncle by marriage. After working on housing projects in Iran and Puerto Rico, Marvel returned to Harvard and completed his master's degree in architecture in 1962.

Marvel moved to Puerto Rico in 1959 after a three-month assignment with the International Basic Economy Corporation, a company established by Nelson A. Rockefeller to develop low-cost housing in developing countries. He utilized local materials, such as cement from local limestone, and designed buildings suited to the tropical environment. His architectural approach included natural ventilation, natural lighting, and the incorporation of gardens.

== Books ==
- The Architecture of the Parish Churches of Puerto Rico
- Antonin Nechodoma, 1877-1928: The Prairie School in the Caribbean

== Awards and recognition ==
In 1990, Marvel received the Henry Klumb Award from the Society of Architects and Landscape Architects of Puerto Rico.
