= Esperanza Guisán =

Spanish philosopher (1940–2015)

Esperanza Guisán (23 April 1940 – 27 November 2015) was a Spanish moral and political philosopher. She was a professor at the University of Santiago de Compostela. Her work was devoted mainly to classical utilitarian theory. A list of many of her works appears at her Google Scholar Web page, including treatises on ethics, democracy, ethics without religion, and Kant.

== Writings ==
In Spanish

- 'Los presupuestos de la falacia naturalista', 1981.
- 'Cómo ser un buen empirista en ética', 1985.
- 'Razón y pasión en ética. Los dilemas de la ética contemporánea', 1986.
- 'Esplendor y miseria de la ética kantiana', 1988.
- 'Manifiesto hedonista', 1990.
- 'La ética mira a la izquierda', 1992.
- 'Ética sin religión', 1993.
- 'Introducción a la ética', 1995.
- 'Más allá de la democracia', 2000.
- 'Una ética de libertad y solidaridad: John Stuart Mill', 2008.

In English

- Taking Ethics Seriously: on the Moral and Political Theory of John Stuart Mill

Esperanza Guisán Telos: Revista iberoamericana de estudios utilitaristas, ISSN 1132-0877, ISSN-e 2255-596X, Vol. 14, Nº. 1, 2005, págs. 11-24

- Is Griffin a millian utilitarian after all?

Esperanza Guisán Telos: Revista iberoamericana de estudios utilitaristas, ISSN 1132-0877, ISSN-e 2255-596X, Vol. 10, Nº. 1, 2001 (Special Issue on: Understanding Griffin), págs. 9-12
