= Ed Lechner =

American football player (1919–2015)

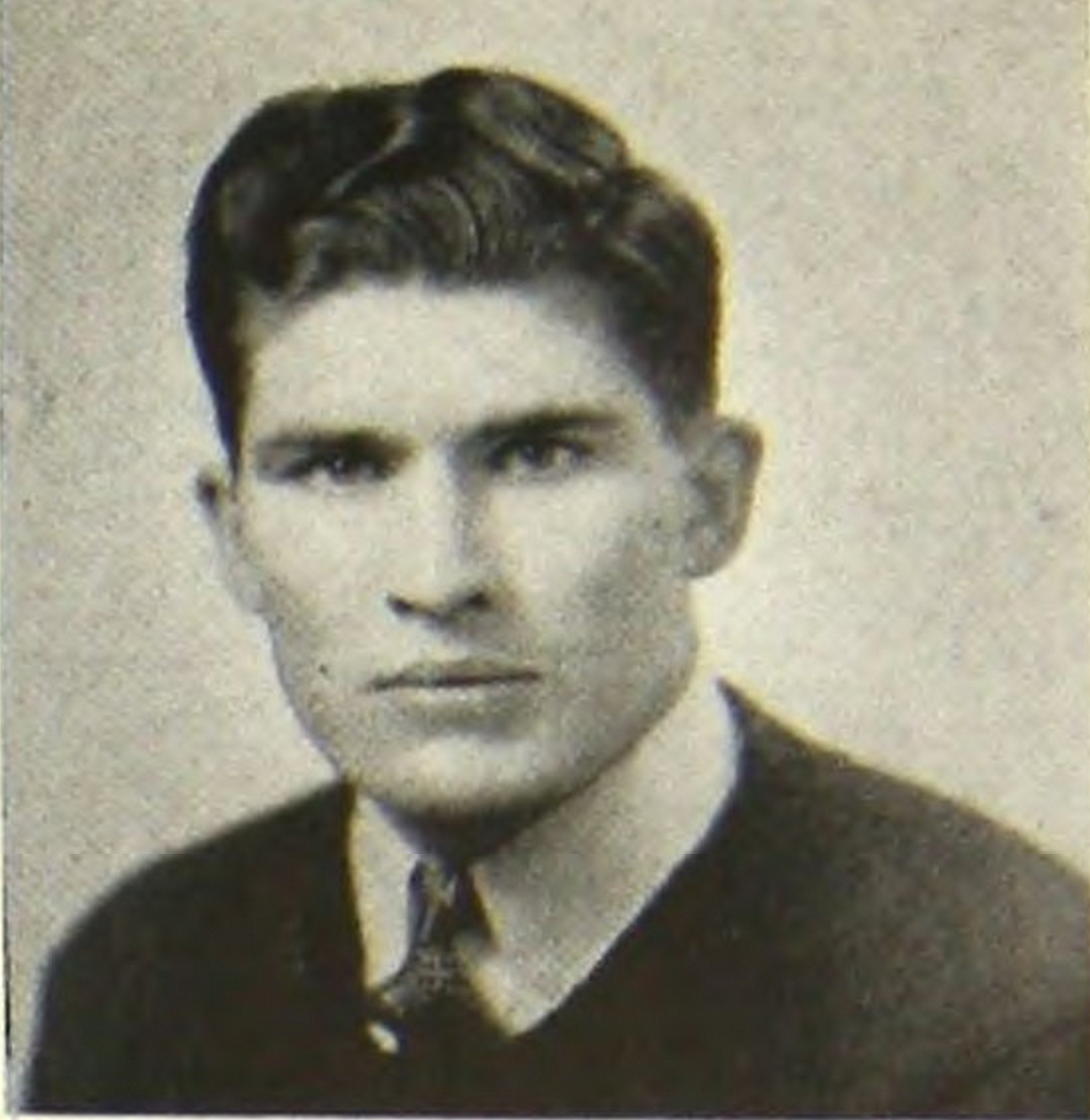
- Lechner at the University of Minnesota, c. 1942

Profile
- Position: Guard / Tackle

Personal information
- Born: December 14, 1919; Fessenden, North Dakota
- Died: November 5, 2015 (aged 95); St. Paul, Minnesota
- Listed height: 6 ft 1 in (1.85 m)
- Listed weight: 200 lb (91 kg)

Career information
- High school: Fessenden (ND)
- College: Minnesota

Career history
- New York Giants (1942)
- Stats at Pro Football Reference

Edgar Henry Lechner (December 14, 1919 – November 5, 2015) was an American football guard and tackle who played one season with the New York Giants of the National Football League. He played college football at the University of Minnesota and attended high school in Fessenden, North Dakota. Lechner also served during World War II with the United States Navy. He was later a dentist and lived in St. Paul until his death in 2015.
