= Joel Sheveloff =

Joel Leonard Sheveloff (September 26, 1934 - November 8, 2015) was an American musicologist, teacher and author.

== Reception ==
Sheveloff graduated from the City University of New York, Queens College, majoring in clarinet then earned a master's and a doctorate from Brandeis University. His 1970 dissertation on the keyboard instrument music of Domenico Scarlatti attracted attention by scholars. According to Robert Marshall and Carlo Grante, Ralph Kirkpatrick's iconic, exemplary work was eventually challenged by Joel Sheveloff. Sheveloff's Scarlatti scholarship(1970-1985), based on a close analysis and comparison of the manuscript and printed historical editions of the sonatas, contradicted Kirkpatrick's claim to have established a chronological order for Scarlatti's keyboard works. Although Scholars have long assumed Scarlatti's preferred instrument to have been the harpsichord, Shevleoff again made a case that Scarlatti would have used Bartolomeo Cristofori's newly invented fortepiano. According to Michael Talbot, Sheveloff is "the doyen of living Scarlatti scholars" while W. D. Sutcliffe said that Sheveloff's doctoral dissertation represents the most important detailed work on the sources, providing "the most considered commentary on Scarlatti's syntactical habits." Sutcliffe takes seriously Sheveloff's claim that Scarlatti's Style is composed of 'an abundance of tiny, special details'.

== Career ==
As a professor of music at Boston University, Sheveloff received the Metcalf Award for Excellence in Teaching, the University's highest teaching honor, in 2004. Although he lectured on diverse musical subjects covering medieval keyboard compositions, Baroque composers, Purcell, Mozart, Haydn, Music under the Tsar and the Soviet Union, Ravel, Brahms, Schubert, 20th-century music, his scholarly focus was the work of Domenico Scarlatti, Modest Mussorgsky, and Igor Stravinsky. He was also interested in specialist areas of meter, methods of musical analysis, and text setting as well as interpretation of the complex Musical Offering, a piece he referred to as " J. S. Bach's DaVinci Code."

== Selected works ==
- J. S. Bach's Musical Offering: An Eighteenth-Century Conundrum.(Edwin Mellen Press Ltd., 2014) ISBN 978-0-77-342913-0
- "Domenico Scarlatti: Tercentenary Frustrations, Part I" The Musical Quarterly Vol. 71, No. 4, 1985
- "Domenico Scarlatti: Tercentenary Frustrations, Part II" The Musical Quarterly Vol. 72, No. 1, 1986
- "Uncertainties in Domenico Scarlatti's musical language." Chigiana Vol. 40, no. 20, proceedings of conference in Siena, 1985
- "Domenico Scarlatti," The New Grove Dictionary of Music and Musicians, 1980, edited by Stanley Sadie. ISBN 978-0-33-323111-1
- "A Masterpiece from an Inhibition : Quashing the 'Inquisitive Savage'" in Nineteenth-Century Piano Music : Essays in Performance and Analysis. edited by David Witten (New York : Garland Publishing, 1997) ISBN 978-0-81-531502-5
- "When Sources Seem to Fail: The Clarinet Parts in Mozart's K. 581(Clarinet Quintet (Mozart)) and K. 622(Clarinet Concerto (Mozart))." Critica Musica: Essays in Honor of Paul Brainard: 379-401
- "The Canon a 2 'Quaerendo invenietis' from Bach's Musical Offering " Master's Thesis, Brandeis University (1964)
