= Dan Poynter =

American author (1938–2015)

- Born: September 17, 1938
- Died: November 3, 2015 (aged 77)
- Education: Bachelor of Arts in Social Science; California State University, Chico
- Occupations: Author, motivational speaker, publisher
- Website: parapublishing.com

Dan Poynter (September 17, 1938 – November 3, 2015) was an American author, consultant, publisher, professional speaker, and parachute designer.

Starting in 1969, he wrote more than 130 books, many reports, and more than 800 magazine articles, most of them on book publishing. His book, The Self-Publishing Manual (1979), propelled him to notoriety in the publishing industry. Each year he addressed scores of groups on the subject of publishing.

== Career ==
He began his career managing a parachute company in Oakland, California. From there, he moved to the east where he became a parachute design specialist and an active skydiver, at which point he began writing about parachute design and use. His column in Parachutist Magazine led him to write books on parachutes and skydiving. Dan became active in the politics of the sport when elected to the board of the Parachute Club of America, later the U.S. Parachute Association.

In 1973, he became interested in the new sport of hang gliding. Unable to find a book on the new sport, he researched, drew from his experience as a pilot and skydiver, and wrote the first book on the subject. He was elected to the board of the U.S. Hang Gliding Association, later the U.S. Hang Gliding & Paragliding Association (USHPA). Later, he served as president of the Commission Internationale du Vol Libre (hang gliding) of the Fédération Aéronautique Internationale in Paris.

In 1979, drawing on what he learned in book writing and publishing, he wrote The Self-Publishing Manual. Continuing to write and publish, he produced a circular book about Frisbee play that included a frisbee. The first book on word processors, pioneered fax-on-demand. He began selling information products from his website in 1996, wrote many more books on writing, publishing, and book promoting and began speaking on the subjects worldwide.

He continued to edit and publish newsletters on book writing/publishing and professional speaking. He edited and published blogs on book writing/publishing and air travel. Poynter earned a Bachelor of Arts in Social Science from California State University, Chico, and also attended San Francisco Law School.

Poynter was Editor of the Publishing Poynter's newsletter on the book industry since 1986 and the Global Speakers Federation NewsBrief for international professional speakers since 2006.

Poynter was an expert skydiver who had been active in the industry since 1962. He wrote more books on parachutes and skydiving than any other author. He served in elective office in various aviation associations including the United States Parachute Association (chairman of the board), The Parachute Industry Association (President), the U.S. Hang Gliding Association (director), and the Commission Internationale du Vol Libre (hang gliding) of the Fédération Aéronautique Internationale (president).

He invented the Style aster parachute, the Fastbak parachute, revolving cones, Tri-vent modification for reserve canopies, and patented the Pop Top parachute.

He was appointed trustee and elected secretary of the American Museum of Sport Parachuting and Air Safety, later the International Skydiving Museum along with being appointed Curator and placed in charge of the inventory of the museum. Poynter established the eMuseum for the museum in 2014.

He was diagnosed with Chromosome 19 Trisomy in 2012, and a stem cell transplant was performed in mid-2013. He fully recovered in 2014, and wrote a book on his experiences, Transplant Handbook for Patients: Replacing Stem Cells in Your Bone Marrow.

He died on November 3, 2015, of acute myeloid leukemia and renal failure.

== Books ==
- Poynter, Dan (1977). The Parachute Manual: A Technical Treatise on the Parachute. Santa Barbara, CA: Para Publishing. pp. 499 pages. ISBN 0915516063.
- Poynter, Dan (1981). Hang Gliding: The Basic Handbook of Ultralight Flying. Santa Barbara, CA: Para Publishing. pp. 186 pages. ISBN 0915516071.
- Poynter, Dan (1997). Expert Witness Handbook. Santa Barbara, CA: Para Publishing. pp. 287 pages. ISBN 1568600275.
- Poynter, Dan (1999). Write & Grow Rich: Using Voice-Recognition to Dictate Your How-To-Book. Santa Barbara, CA: Para Publishing. pp. 160 pages. ISBN 1568600585.
- Poynter, Dan (1999). Successful Nonfiction: Tips and Inspiration for Getting Published. Santa Barbara, CA: Para Publishing. pp. 144 pages. ISBN 1-56860-061-5.
- Poynter, Dan (contributor) (2000). Chicken Soup for the Writer's Soul. Deerfield Beach, FL: Health Communications. pp. 400 pages. ISBN 1-55874-769-9.
- Poynter, Dan (2002). The Older Cat: Recognizing Decline & Extending Life. Santa Barbara, CA: Para Publishing. pp. 139 pages. ISBN 1-56860-076-3.
- Poynter, Dan (2002). U-Publish.Com: How 'U' Can Effectively Compete with the Giants of Publishing. Santa Barbara, CA: Para Publishing. pp. 184 pages. ISBN 1588320022.
- Poynter, Dan (2006). Book Publishing Encyclopedia. Santa Barbara, CA: Para Publishing. pp. 224 pages. ISBN 1-56860-127-1.
- Poynter, Dan (2007). Is There a Book Inside You?: Writing Alone or with a Collaborator. Santa Barbara, CA: Para Publishing. pp. 235 pages. ISBN 978-1-56860-046-8.
- Poynter, Dan (2007). Parachuting: The Skydiver's Handbook. Santa Barbara, CA: Para Publishing. pp. 408. ISBN 978-1-56860-141-0.
- Poynter, Dan (2007). Writing Nonfiction: Turning Thoughts into Books. Santa Barbara, CA: Para Publishing. pp. 144 pages. ISBN 978-1-56860-110-6.
- Poynter, Dan (2007). Dan Poynter's Self-Publishing Manual: How to Write, Print and Sell Your Own Book. Santa Barbara, CA: Para Publishing. pp. 463 pages. ISBN 978-1-56860-142-7.
- Poynter, Dan (2009). Self-Publishing Manual, Volume 2: How to Write, Print and Sell Your Own Book. Santa Barbara, CA: Para Publishing. pp. 144 pages. ISBN 978-1-56860-148-9.
- Poynter, Dan (2011). Air Travel Handbook: Tips, Tricks & Secrets on Flying. Santa Barbara, CA: Para Publishing. pp. 144 pages. ISBN 978-1-56860-149-6.
- Poynter, Dan (2011). Dan Poynter's Air Travel Handbook. Santa Barbara, CA: Para Publishing. pp. 322 pages. ISBN 978-1568601502.
- Poynter, Dan (2012). Writing Your Book. Santa Barbara, CA: Para Publishing. pp. 58 pages. ASIN B007VP66Z0.
- Poynter, Dan (2012). Books: Tips, Stories, & Advice on Writing, Publishing, & Promoting. Santa Barbara, CA: Para Publishing. pp. 225 pages. ASIN B007VXL7M4.
- Poynter, Dan (2012). KDP SelectTM: Navigating Kindle's Freebie Day. Santa Barbara, CA: Para Publishing. ASIN B00876ZRZ2.
- Poynter, Dan (2012). Book Fairs: An Exhibiting Guide for Publishers. Santa Barbara, CA: Para Publishing. pp. 98 pages. ASIN B009080XOQ.
- Poynter, Dan (2014). Tailwinds: Adventures of a Young Aviator. Santa Barbara, CA: Para Publishing. pp. 295 pages. ISBN 978-1-56860-161-8.
- Poynter, Dan (2014). Transplant Handbook for Patients: Replacing Stem Cells in Your Bone Marrow. Santa Barbara, CA: Para Publishing. pp. 262 pages. ISBN 978-1-56860-163-2.
