= Naila Faran =

Saudi Arabian physician (1978–2015)

Naila Faran نائلة فاران
- Born: Naila Mohammed Habib Al Faran; 1978
- Died: 11 November 2015 (aged 36–37); Hospital Aramco, Dhahran, Saudi Arabia
- Education: Faculty of Medical Sciences, King Saud University Charles Drew University in Los Angeles
- Known for: The first Saudi to get certification in nuclear medicine
- Medical career
- Field: nuclear medicine
- Research: nuclear medicine

Naila Mohammed Habib Al Faran (1978 – 12 November 2015) was a Saudi doctor who was the first Saudi woman to specialize in nuclear medicine.

== Early career ==
Faran initiated her medical career by participating in the summer program at King Saud University's Faculty of Medical Sciences from 1998 to 1999, which was organized by Saudi Aramco. She subsequently completed a training course in the field from 2000 to 2001 and graduated in 2002. Afterward, she joined the Advanced Imaging Unit at the Dhahran Health Center, a Saudi Aramco affiliate.

In 2006, she was selected for the Nuclear Medicine Certification Program in California. Meanwhile, she divided her time between study at Charles Draw University, Los Angeles, and on-the-job training at Saint Joseph Hospital in Orange State, and, finally, obtained her full certification in 2007. Commenting on her experience at the Dhahran Health Center, Faran noted that she appreciated the center for its top nuclear medicine programs and its openness to innovation. Nuclear medicine is a branch of medicine and medical imaging that uses nuclear properties of matter in diagnosis and therapy.

== Death ==
On November 11, 2015 in Faran died in Aramco Hospital in Dhahran in Saudi Arabia after a long illness.
