= Sipke van der Land =

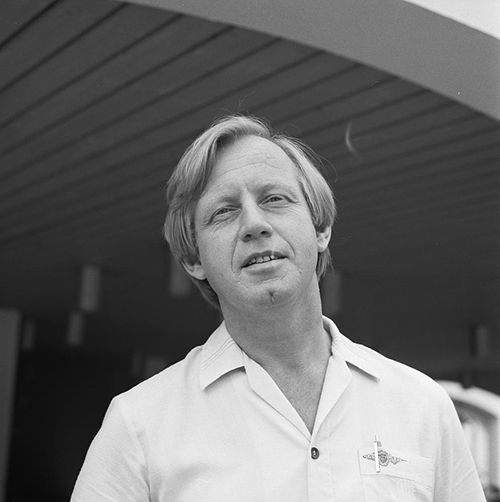
Van der Land (1981)

Sipke van der Land (12 February 1937 – 22 November 2015) was a Dutch preacher, writer, teacher and television presenter.

Van der Land was born in Kollum, Netherlands. His family moved to Wassenaar during his childhood. He studied theology and Dutch. In the 1960s, Van der Land taught Dutch and religion at the Christian Lyceum Visser't Hooft. He is supposed to be the mentor of pianist Jan Vayne and was also the instructor of journalist Hans Sahar. He published dozens of children's books, religious books, collections of poetry, and books on art. He presented different programs for the broadcaster NCRV in the 1970s and 1980s. Van der Land debuted with the children's book Ik heb een mes in 1966. Rumors were that his television series were based on cults and that his book was on the same topic: Wat bezielt ze? (1980). He also wrote monographs on artists such as Karel Arkema and Roeland Koning.

Sipke van der Land died in 2015 at the age of 78 in a hospital in his hometown of Wassenaar.
