= Leon Vlok =

South African cricketer (1929–2015)

Personal information
- Full name: Leon du Toit Vlok
- Born: 3 March 1929; Pretoria, South Africa
- Died: 8 November 2015 (aged 86); Pretoria, South Africa
- Source: ESPNcricinfo, 28 June 2016

Leon Vlok (3 March 1929 – 8 November 2015) was a South African cricketer. He played twelve first-class matches for North Eastern Transvaal between 1950 and 1953.
