= Harold Cagle (American football) =

American football player and coach (1936–2015)

Biographical details
- Born: July 23, 1936; Rascal Flats, Oklahoma, U.S.
- Died: November 29, 2015 (aged 79)

Playing career
- 1954–1955: Connors
- 1956–1957: Northeastern State
- Position: Quarterback

Coaching career (HC unless noted)
- 1958: Chetopa HS (KS)
- 1959–1961: Catoosa HS (OK)
- 1962: Henryetta HS (OK)
- 1963–1964: Connors (assistant)
- 1965–1966: Connors
- 1969: Central Missouri (DC)
- 1970–1973: Missouri Western
- 1974: Coweta HS (OK)

Head coaching record
- Overall: 10–27–1 (college); 3–17 (junior college)

Harold D. Cagle (July 23, 1936 – November 29, 2015) was an American football coach, athletics administrator, and educator. He was the first head football coach at Missouri Western College—now known as—Missouri Western State University in St. Joseph, Missouri, serving from 1970 to 1973. Cagle was the head football coach at Connors State Agricultural and Mechanical College—now known as Connors State College—in Warner, Oklahoma from 1965 to 1966. The Connors football program was disbanded after the 1966 season. In early 1967, he was hired as head football coach by Dodge City Community College in Dodge City, Kansas. However, by the spring of that year, he resigned due to health concerns, and was replaced by Jim Paramore.

Cable was born on July 23, 1936, in Rascal Flats, Oklahoma, and was raised in Catoosa, Oklahoma, where he attended school. He died on November 29, 2015.

== Head coaching record ==
=== College ===
Year	Team	Overall	Conference	Standing	Bowl/playoffs
Missouri Western Griffons (NAIA Division II independent) (1970–1973)
1970	Missouri Western	1–8			
1971	Missouri Western	2–7			
1972	Missouri Western	3–7			
1973	Missouri Western	4–5–1			
Missouri Western:		10–27–1			
Total:		10–27–1			

=== Junior college ===
Year	Team	Overall	Conference	Standing	Bowl/playoffs
Connors Aggies (Oklahoma Junior College Conference) (1965–1966)
1965	Connors	3–7	1–7	5th	
1966	Connors	0–10	0–4	5th	
Connors:		3–17	1–11		
Total:		3–17			
