= Karl Jaeger (educator) =

American educator, writer and artist

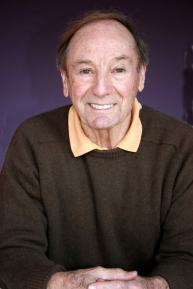
- Karl Jaeger (2009)
- Born: April 12, 1930; Los Angeles, California, U.S.
- Died: November 3, 2015 (aged 85); Bath, UK
- Occupations: Educator, writer, artist

Karl Jaeger (April 12, 1930 – November 3, 2015) was an American educator, writer and artist.

== Early life and education ==
Karl was born in April 1930 in the United States. He graduated with a bachelor's degree in Education from Ohio State University and a master's degree in Education from Harvard University.

== Career ==
Karl Jaeger was co-founder, Trustee and Chairman of Our Future Planet (OFP), which is a digital magazine website and online community with a worldwide Citizenship. The mission of Our Future Planet is to provide an environment for people to create a better planet to live on and to share innovative approaches to enhance the quality, liveability and beauty of the Earth. Citizens can create profiles and add their own proposals on an Ideas Globe and join in discussions with other Citizens on WikiVisions.". Other Trustees of Our Future Planet are Samantha Harvey, Jean Houston and James Gillis Lengel.

Karl was the creator of several community design projects including the Cambridge Charter School system a student-centered secondary school which received approval from the Massachusetts Department of Elementary and Secondary Education on March 14, 1996.

Karl was Founder and executive director of the International School of America established in 1958. The International School of America organized 8-month multi-country study abroad programs for university students to maximize the educational benefits from international travel. Students stayed with host families in six to nine destinations during an eight-month academic year learning about social, urban and rural organizations, value systems, family structure, sustainability, ecology, anthropology, and educational systems. Karl taught and led five travel programs around the globe for the International School of America.

== Artworks ==
Jaeger's artwork and kinetic sculptures have been exhibited in museums. He designed a habitable garden sculpture intended to be built in Maine, conceived as a walk-through structure with glass-enclosed spaces offering views of surrounding mountains, rocks, trees and water.

The garden and the habitable sculpture are linked together by glass openings with their own alterable degrees of varied apertures. The edifice is also a round theatre with dramatic events triggered either by nature during the day and night and by electric illumination of the garden elements or visual movement within the mirrored cube.

Karl was also a collector of postcards and had over 80,000 postcards collected from around the world.
