= Deaths in October 2015 =

The following is a list of notable deaths in October 2015.

Entries for each day are listed alphabetically by surname. A typical entry lists information in the following sequence:

- Name, age, country of citizenship and reason for notability, established cause of death, reference.

== October 2015 ==
=== 1 ===
- Božo Bakota, 64, Croatian footballer (NK Zagreb, SK Sturm Graz).
- Jacques Brodin, 68, French fencer, Olympic bronze medalist (1964).
- Harold Caskey, 77, American politician, member of the Missouri Senate (1977–2005), Parkinson's disease.
- Don Edwards, 100, American politician, member of the U.S. House of Representatives from California (1963–1995).
- Erma Johnson Hadley, 73, American educator, Chancellor of Tarrant County College, pancreatic cancer.
- Illtyd Harrington, 84, British politician.
- Max Keeping, 73, Canadian broadcaster (CJOH), cancer.
- Stanisław Kociołek, 82, Polish politician, Deputy Prime Minister (1970).
- Cal Neeman, 86, American baseball player (Chicago Cubs, Philadelphia Phillies).
- Hadi Norouzi, 30, Iranian footballer (Persepolis), heart attack.
- Frans Pointl, 82, Dutch writer, nerve disease.
- Jacob Pressman, 95, American Conservative rabbi, co-founder of American Jewish University.
- Alfredo Prieto, 49, Salvadoran-American serial killer, execution by lethal injection.
- Usnija Redžepova, 69, Macedonian singer, lung cancer.
- Angelito Sarmiento, 68, Filipino politician, member of the House of Representatives (1992–2001), heart attack.
- Gottfried Schatz, 79, Austrian biochemist, cancer.
- Johnny Strange, 23, American mountain climber and adventurer, wingsuit collision.
- Jean-Jacques Tillmann, 80, Swiss sports journalist.
- Joe Wark, 67, Scottish footballer (Motherwell), dementia.

=== 2 ===
- Willie Akins, 76, American jazz saxophonist, heart failure.
- Naim Araidi, 65, Israeli Druze academic and poet, Ambassador to Norway (2012–2014), cancer.
- Steve Camacho, 69, Guyanese cricketer (West Indies), cancer.
- François Dagognet, 91, French philosopher.
- Eric Arturo Delvalle, 78, Panamanian politician, President (1985–1988).
- Ferdinand Joseph Fonseca, 89, Indian Roman Catholic prelate, Auxiliary Bishop of Bombay (1980–2000).
- Brian Friel, 86, Irish dramatist (Philadelphia, Here I Come!, Dancing at Lughnasa, Translations).
- Rodolfo Frigeri, 73, Argentine economist and politician, Minister of Economy and Public Finances (2001).
- Alex Giannini, 57, English actor (Not About Nightingales, Legend, The Knock), heart attack.
- Coleridge Goode, 100, Jamaican-born British jazz bassist.
- Arthur Lawson Johnston, 3rd Baron Luke, 82, British peer and politician.
- Bill Kelley, 89, American football player (Green Bay Packers).
- Lindsay Kline, 81, Australian cricketer.
- Serhiy Krulykovskyi, 69, Ukrainian footballer (Dynamo Kyiv).
- Lubomír Lipský, 92, Czech actor, pneumonia.
- Megateo, 39, Colombian criminal.
- James Mutende, 53, Ugandan politician, State Minister of Industry (since 2011).
- Johnny Paton, 92, Scottish football player (Brentford, Watford, Celtic), coach and manager (Arsenal 'A').
- Alan Prince, 100, Canadian bureaucrat, Director of the Nuclear Safety Commission (1975–1978), oversaw the clean up of Kosmos 954.
- Hal Schacker, 90, American baseball player (Boston Braves).
- Andy Sperandeo, 70, American magazine editor (Model Railroader), cancer.
- Jean-Noël Tassez, 59, French journalist.

=== 3 ===
- Utpal Kumar Basu, 76, Indian poet.
- A. R. M. Abdul Cader, 78, Sri Lankan politician, MP (1989–2004).
- Denis Healey, 98, British politician, Secretary of State for Defence (1964–1970), Chancellor of the Exchequer (1974–1979), heart attack.
- Lloyd Hinchberger, 84, Canadian ice hockey player (New Haven Blades, Nashville Dixie Flyers).
- Olga Hirshhorn, 95, American art collector.
- Isao Hosoe, 73, Japanese designer.
- Javed Iqbal, 90, Pakistani judge, Justice of the Supreme Court (1986–1989).
- Muhammad Nawaz Khan, 71, Pakistani historian and writer, Parkinson's disease.
- Kita, 57, Brazilian footballer, Olympic silver medalist (1984), liver cancer.
- Stewart McInnes, 78, Canadian lawyer and politician, member of Parliament (1984–1988), heart failure.
- Barbara Meek, 81, American actress (Archie Bunker's Place), heart attack.
- Raghavan Narasimhan, 78, Indian mathematician.
- Paul R. Norby, 102, American Navy rear admiral.
- Dave Pike, 77, American jazz musician, emphysema.
- Arthur A. Small, 81, American lawyer and poet, kidney failure.
- Masjchun Sofwan, 88, Indonesian Governor of Jambi (1979–1989).
- Gerald Squires, 77, Canadian artist, cancer.
- Christopher Tambling, 51, British composer and choirmaster, cancer.
- William Taylor, 77, New Zealand children's writer and politician, Mayor of Ohakune (1981–1988).
- Peter Tillers, 72, Latvian-born American legal scholar.
- Franciszek Walicki, 94, Polish journalist.

=== 4 ===
- Yves Barsacq, 84, French film actor, pneumonia.
- Austin Darragh, 88, Irish medical practitioner and entrepreneur.
- José Eduardo Dutra, 58, Brazilian businessman (Petrobras) and politician, Senator (since 1994), cancer.
- Tove Fergo, 69, Danish politician, Minister for Ecclesiastical Affairs (2001–2005), member of Folketinget (1994–2005), cancer.
- Daniel Fletcher, 41, Australian AFL football player (Geelong), fall.
- S. Malcolm Gillis, 74, American academic, President of Rice University (1993–2004), cancer.
- Juan Carlos Ibáñez, 46, Argentine footballer (Independiente), beaten.
- Peter Knight, 67, English rugby union player.
- Pamela Ann McDougall, 90, Canadian diplomat.
- Jack McKee, 71, Northern Irish politician, Mayor of Larne (1984–1985).
- J. Whyatt Mondesire, 66, American journalist and civil rights activist, brain aneurysm.
- Eduardo Pavlovsky, 81, Argentine actor and playwright.
- Edida Nageswara Rao, 81, Indian film producer (Sankarabharanam).
- Job de Ruiter, 85, Dutch politician, Minister of Justice (1977–1981), Minister of Defence (1981–1986).
- Sir John Severne, 90, British Royal Air Force officer.
- Jim Thomas, 76, American CFL player (Edmonton Eskimos).
- Neal Walk, 67, American basketball player (Phoenix Suns, New Orleans Jazz, New York Knicks).
- Bob Whan, 82, Australian politician, MP for Eden-Monaro (1972–1975), cardiac arrest.
- Oganes Zanazanyan, 68, Greek-born Armenian football player (Ararat Yerevan) and coach, Olympic bronze medalist (1972).

=== 5 ===
- Chantal Akerman, 65, Belgian film director (Jeanne Dielman, 23 quai du Commerce, 1080 Bruxelles), suicide.
- Frank Albanese, 84, American boxer and actor (The Sopranos, Goodfellas, Dead Presidents), prostate cancer.
- Joker Arroyo, 88, Filipino politician, Senator (2001–2013), heart attack.
- Gösta Bergkvist, 95, Swedish Olympic runner (1948).
- Grace Lee Boggs, 100, American civil rights activist and author.
- Larry Brezner, 73, American film producer (Good Morning Vietnam, Throw Momma From the Train, Ride Along), leukemia.
- Michael Dean, 82, New Zealand broadcaster (Late Night Line-Up), dementia.
- Ana Diosdado, 77, Argentine-born Spanish playwright and actress, cardiorespiratory failure.
- Flavio Emoli, 81, Italian footballer (Juventus).
- Mary Jane Farell, 95, American bridge player.
- Joe Henson, 82, British farmer and conservationist.
- Óscar Herrera, 56, Chilean footballer.
- Earnestine Howard, 63–64, American politician, member of the Georgia House of Representatives (2005–2007).
- Infante Carlos, Duke of Calabria, 77, Spanish nobleman.
- Li Yongtai, 87, Chinese lieutenant general and politician.
- Trevor Lloyd, 91, Welsh rugby union player.
- Henning Mankell, 67, Swedish author (Kurt Wallander), cancer.
- John O'Leary, 82, Irish politician, TD for Kerry South (1966–1997).
- Anna Pump, 81, German-born American baker and cookbook author, vehicle-pedestrian collision.
- Andrew Rubin, 69, American actor (Police Academy, Mary Hartman, Mary Hartman, Joe Bash), lung cancer.
- Niall Rudd, 88, Irish-born British classical scholar.
- Ales Savitsky, 91, Belarusian writer.
- Gina Sigstad, 88, Norwegian Olympic cross-country skier.
- Jos Vandeloo, 90, Belgian author.
- Anthony F. C. Wallace, 92, Canadian-born American anthropologist.
- Peter Wespi, 72, Swiss Olympic ice hockey player (1964), cancer.

=== 6 ===
- Christine Arnothy, 84, Hungarian-French writer.
- Duncan Bluck, 88, British businessman (Swire Group).
- Kevin Corcoran, 66, American actor and producer (Old Yeller, Pete's Dragon, Sons of Anarchy), colorectal cancer.
- Rich Davis, 89, American businessman, creator of KC Masterpiece barbecue sauce.
- Juan Martin Garcia, 35, American murderer, execution by lethal injection.
- Charles Coulston Gillispie, 97, American historian, President of History of Science Society (1965–1966).
- Árpád Göncz, 93, Hungarian writer and politician, President (1990–2000).
- Smokey Johnson, 78, American drummer.
- Stasys Povilaitis, 68, Lithuanian singer and poet, lung cancer.
- Fernando Rainieri, 74–75, Dominican politician, minister of tourism.
- Billy Joe Royal, 73, American pop and country singer ("Down in the Boondocks", "Cherry Hill Park", "Burned Like a Rocket").
- Vladimir Shlapentokh, 88, Ukrainian-born American sociologist.
- Sandra Spuzich, 78, American golfer.
- Bill Stanley, 58, American mammalogist, director of collections at Field Museum.
- Carmen Marina Torres, 58, Colombian actress.
- Otto Tucker, 92, Canadian educationalist.
- Juan Vicente Ugarte del Pino, 92, Peruvian historian and jurist.
- Ivan Vidav, 97, Slovenian mathematician.

=== 7 ===
- Gene Allen, 97, American art director (My Fair Lady), President of the Academy of Motion Picture Arts and Sciences (1983–1985).
- Ray Appleton, 74, American jazz drummer, heart failure.
- Pushpa Bhuyan, 69, Indian classical dancer.
- Ângelo da Cunha Pinto, 66, Brazilian-Portuguese chemist.
- Giordana Di Stefano, 20, Italian murder victim, stabbing.
- Friedrich Diedrich, 80, German Roman Catholic theologian.
- Dominique Dropsy, 63, French footballer (Valenciennes, Strasbourg, Bordeaux), leukemia.
- Harry Gallatin, 88, American Hall of Fame basketball player (New York Knicks, Detroit Pistons) and coach (New York Knicks, St. Louis Hawks), complications from surgery.
- Hossein Hamadani, 60, Iranian military officer.
- Andy Hawkins, 57, American football player (Tampa Bay Buccaneers, San Diego Chargers, Kansas City Chiefs).
- Hy Hollinger, 97, American journalist (Variety) and publicist (Paramount Pictures), international editor of The Hollywood Reporter (1992–2008).
- Hasan Jamil, 63, Pakistani cricketer, cardiac arrest.
- Kenneth Koe, 90, American chemist.
- Elena Lucena, 101, Argentine film actress.
- W. R. Mitchell, 87, British writer and editor (Dalesman).
- Julius Muthamia, 81, Kenyan politician.
- Maria Lúcia Prandi, 70, Brazilian academic and politician, cancer.
- Paget Stewart, 52, Canadian Olympic biathlete, suicide.
- Jack Taylor, 83, British Olympic wrestler.
- Charles P. West, 94, American politician, member of the Delaware House of Representatives (1956–1958, 1978–2002).
- Helen Wilkes, 88, American businesswoman and politician, first female Mayor of West Palm Beach, Florida (1978–1979), City Commissioner (1976–1988).
- Arthur Woods, 86, New Zealand rugby union player (Southland, national team).
- Clive Young, 67, British Anglican prelate, Bishop of Dunwich (1999–2013), complications from surgery.
- Gail Zappa, 70, American businesswoman, lung cancer.
- Jurelang Zedkaia, 65, Marshallese Iroijlaplap and politician, President of the Marshall Islands (2009–2012), heart attack.

=== 8 ===
- Gottfried Anglberger, 84, Austrian Olympic wrestler.
- James Cruickshank, 53, Australian musician, bowel cancer.
- Richard Davies, 89, Welsh character actor (Please Sir!), Alzheimer's disease.
- Teifion Davies, 75, Australian Olympic boxer.
- Eric Dawe, 94, Canadian businessman and politician, member of the Newfoundland House of Assembly for Port de Grave (1962–1971, 1975–1979).
- Jim Diamond, 64, Scottish singer-songwriter ("I Should Have Known Better"), pulmonary edema.
- Dennis Eichhorn, 70, American writer and comic book artist, pneumonia.
- Harold Irving Ewen, 93, American physicist and radio astronomer.
- Tom Goode, 76, American football player (Baltimore Colts).
- Enrique Gratas, 71, Argentine television presenter, lung cancer.
- Tim Gray, 62, American football player (Kansas City Chiefs, St. Louis Cardinals, San Francisco Giants).
- Dora Holzhandler, 87, French-born British painter.
- Lindy Infante, 75, American football coach (Green Bay Packers, Indianapolis Colts), pneumonia.
- Bob Jensen, 89, American football player (Chicago Rockets/Hornets, Baltimore Colts).
- Rubén Maidana, 92, Argentine Olympic water polo player.
- István Nemeskürty, 90, Hungarian writer and screenwriter.
- Paul Prudhomme, 75, American chef, cookbook writer and restaurateur, recipient of the Order of Agricultural Merit (1980).
- Elizabeth Ramsey, 83, Filipino comedian, singer and actress, hyperglycemic attack.
- Massimo Scaglione, 84, Italian film director.
- Hugh Scully, 72, British television presenter (Antiques Roadshow).
- Jan Wallman, 93, American nightclub owner and producer.
- Stephen B. Wiley, 86, American politician, member of the New Jersey Senate (1973–1978).

=== 9 ===
- Ben Abraham, 90, Polish-born Brazilian Holocaust survivor, author and journalist.
- Jean Badal, 88, Hungarian cinematographer.
- Ronald Brunskill, 86, British architectural historian.
- Du Runsheng, 102, Chinese politician.
- Raymond Duncan, 84, American entrepreneur and winemaker (Silver Oak Cellars).
- Richard C. Green, 62, American financial economist, cancer.
- Gordon Honeycombe, 79, British newscaster, author and actor, leukaemia.
- Geoffrey Howe, Baron Howe of Aberavon, 88, British politician, Chancellor of the Exchequer (1979–1983), Foreign Secretary (1983–1989), heart attack.
- Ravindra Jain, 71, Indian composer, kidney illness.
- Julia Jones, 92, British scriptwriter (Quiet as a Nun, Our Mutual Friend).
- Blanca Magrassi Scagno, 92, Mexican women's rights activist.
- Dave Meyers, 62, American basketball player (UCLA, Milwaukee Bucks), cancer.
- Bruce Nazarian, 66, American musician (Brownsville Station) and producer.
- Jerry Parr, 85, American Secret Service agent, extricated Ronald Reagan during assassination attempt, heart failure.
- Tony Rafty, 99, Australian caricaturist, complications from pneumonia.
- N. Ramani, 81, Indian flautist.
- Larry Rosen, 75, American jazz producer, brain cancer.
- Ray Vecchio, 82, American politician.
- Ronald Lampman Watts, 86, Canadian academic, Principal of Queen's University (1974–1984).
- Eric Wright, 86, Canadian crime writer, kidney cancer.
- Zdravko Zupan, 65, Yugoslav Serbian comic-book creator and historian.
- Koopsta Knicca, 40, American rapper (Three 6 Mafia), stroke and brain aneurysm.

=== 10 ===
- Alvin P. Adams Jr., 73, American diplomat, Ambassador to Peru (1993–1996), Haiti (1989–1992), and Djibouti (1983–1985), heart attack.
- Sam Adams Sr., 67, American football player (New England Patriots, New Orleans Saints).
- Nuriyya Ahmadova, 64, Azerbaijani actress, heart attack.
- Diepreye Alamieyeseigha, 62, Nigerian politician, Governor of Bayelsa (1999–2005).
- Kane Ashcroft, 29, English footballer (York City), cancer.
- Hilla Becher, 81, German photographer.
- Wes Funk, 46, Canadian author.
- Sophie el Goulli, 83, Tunisian writer and historian.
- Garry Hancock, 61, American baseball player (Boston Red Sox, Oakland Athletics).
- Richard F. Heck, 84, American chemist, Nobel Laureate in Chemistry (2010).
- Tord Johansson, 60, Swedish businessman.
- Lyudmila Kedrina, 54, Russian Soviet alpine skier, cancer.
- Steve Mackay, 66, American saxophonist (The Stooges), sepsis.
- Manorama, 78, Indian Tamil actress, heart attack.
- Sir David Penry-Davey, 73, British jurist.
- Shamek Pietucha, 39, Polish-born Canadian Olympic swimmer.
- Rochunga Pudaite, 88, Indian writer and translator.
- Maggie Riley, 79, British actress (Hazell, Grange Hill).
- Tex Rudloff, 89, American sound editor (Taxi Driver, The Buddy Holly Story, The Warriors).
- Mahmoud Sehili, 84, Tunisian artist.
- Elias Skaff, 67, Lebanese politician.
- Sybil Stockdale, 90, American human rights activist, co-founder of National League of Families, Parkinson's disease.
- Stan Stoker, 71, English cricketer.
- Robbin Thompson, 66, American singer-songwriter (Steel Mill), cancer.
- Amorn Yuktanandana, 87, Thai Olympic sport shooter.

=== 11 ===
- Ali Barraud, 97, Burkinabe politician.
- John Berg, 83, American art director and designer, pneumonia.
- Dean Chance, 74, American baseball player (Los Angeles Angels, Minnesota Twins, Detroit Tigers) and boxing official, heart attack.
- Matthew Cooper, 67, British Olympic rower.
- Jeanette Crossley, 66, New Zealand biochemist.
- S. A. David, 91, Sri Lankan Tamil political activist.
- Jack Drake, 81, American politician, member of the Iowa House of Representatives (since 1993).
- David Hunt, 55, British racing driver.
- Smokin' Joe Kubek, 58, American blues guitarist, heart attack.
- George Mathers, 96, British architect.
- Bob Minkler, 78, American sound mixer (Star Wars, Tron, Mask), Oscar winner (1978), respiratory failure.
- Salvador Trane Modesto, 85, Filipino Roman Catholic prelate, Auxiliary Bishop of Dumaguete (1978–1987) and San Carlos (1987–2005).
- John Murphy, 56, Australian drummer, percussionist and multi-instrumental session musician, cancer.
- Andrew Sayers, 58, British-born Australian curator, Director of the National Portrait Gallery (1998–2010), pancreatic cancer.

=== 12 ===
- Sakit Aliyev, 49, Azerbaijani football player and coach (Turan IK).
- Mary Adrian Barrett, 86, American Roman Catholic nun.
- Anna Campbell Bliss, 90, American artist and architect.
- Sergio Caprari, 83, Italian boxer, Olympic silver medalist (1952).
- Kevin Cass, 77, Australian Grand Prix motorcycle road racer.
- Paul Costa, 73, American football player (Buffalo Bills).
- Sam de Brito, 46, Australian author and columnist.
- Peter Dougherty, 59, American music television executive, creator (Yo! MTV Raps) and video producer, heart attack.
- Colleen Farrington, 79, American model and singer.
- David Finnegan, 74, American attorney, talk show host and politician, lung cancer.
- Ernestine Friedl, 95, American anthropologist.
- Hal Hackady, 93, American lyricist and screenwriter.
- Abdallah Kigoda, 61, Tanzanian politician, Minister of Industry and Trade (since 2012), cancer.
- Levent Kırca, 67, Turkish actor, liver cancer.
- Armin Kircher, 48, Austrian composer and conductor, heart failure.
- Kazuo Kumakura, 88, Japanese actor.
- Joan Leslie, 90, American actress (High Sierra, Sergeant York, Yankee Doodle Dandy).
- Robert Leuci, 75, American police detective and writer, complications after surgery.
- Joseph J. Minnick, 82, American politician, member of Maryland House of Delegates (1995–2015), blood disease.
- George Mueller, 97, American space engineer, Associate Administrator of the NASA Office of Manned Space Flight (1963–1969).
- Maksut Narikbaev, 75, Kazakh jurist, Chairman of the Supreme Court of Kazakhstan (1996–2000).
- Sophie Nogler, 91, Austrian Olympic alpine skier (1948).
- Tom Ognibene, 72, American politician, member of the New York City Council (1992–2001), cancer.
- Leo J. Reding, 91, American politician, member of the Minnesota House of Representatives (1975–1995).
- Gennady Riger, 67, Israeli politician, member of the Knesset (1999–2003).
- Laurence Smart, 87, Australian cricketer.

=== 13 ===
- Rosalyn Baxandall, 76, American historian and feminist activist, kidney cancer.
- Guenther Boden, 80, German-born American endocrinologist.
- Arsenio Chirinos, 80, Venezuelan Olympic cyclist (1956, 1960).
- Selwyn Closs-Parry, 89-90, Welsh archdeacon.
- Sir James Cruthers, 90, Australian business executive, pneumonia.
- Jim Dobbin, 88, Canadian football player (Calgary Stampeders).
- Duncan Druce, 76, English composer and musicologist.
- Kyogon Hagiyama, 83, Japanese politician, member of the House of Representatives for Toyama Prefecture (1990–2009), heart failure.
- Bruce Hyde, 74, American educator and actor (Star Trek), throat cancer.
- Sue Lloyd-Roberts, 64, British television journalist (BBC, ITN), leukaemia.
- Leif Mevik, 85, Norwegian diplomat.
- Julien J. Studley, 88, Belgian-born American businessman.
- Skatemaster Tate, 56, American musician and television show host, liver cancer.
- K. Velayudam, 65, Sri Lankan politician and trade unionist, MP for Badulla (2001–2004, 2014–2015).
- Michael Walsh, 88, British Army general and scouting leader, Chief Scout (1982–1988).
- Michael John Wise, 97, British geographer.
- Sohel Al-Masum, 40, Bangladeshi footballer

=== 14 ===
- Nurlan Balgimbayev, 67, Kazakh politician, Prime Minister (1997–1999), cancer.
- Bobby Braithwaite, 78, Northern Irish footballer (Linfield, Middlesbrough, national team).
- Antonio Cedrés, 87, Spanish footballer (Real Betis).
- Marianne Dickerson, 54, American long-distance runner.
- Takehiko Furuta, 89, Japanese historian.
- José Luis García, 91, Mexican baseball player and manager (Tigres de Quintana Roo).
- Peter Hermes, 93, German diplomat.
- Richard Holden, 88, American dancer and choreographer.
- Mathieu Kérékou, 82, Beninese politician, President (1972–1991, 1996–2006).
- Margaret Keyes, 97, American historian and preserver of historic buildings.
- Jimmy Lord, 79, American politician.
- Florența Mihai, 60, Romanian tennis player, coach and official, Secretary General of the RTF (1984–1989), cancer.
- Jordi Miralles, 53, Spanish politician, member of the Parliament of Catalonia (2003–2012), meningitis.
- Bruce Mozert, 98, American photographer.
- Sol Roper, 79, English rugby league player (Workington Town).
- Aubrey Rozzell, 82, American football player (Pittsburgh Steelers, Montreal Alouettes).
- Radhakrishna Hariram Tahiliani, 85, Indian admiral and politician, Chief of the Naval Staff (1984–1987), Governor of Sikkim (1990–1994).
- Paul W. Taylor, 91, American philosopher.
- Reg Tubby, 91, Australian politician.
- Robert M. White, 92, American meteorologist, director of the National Weather Service (1963–1965), ESSA (1965–1970), NOAA (1970–1977), complications of dementia.
- Miranda Yap, 67, Singaporean chemical engineer.
- Dan Zaneski, 70, American football coach.

=== 15 ===
- Lennart Anderson, 87, American painter.
- Jaromír Bünter, 85, Czech Olympic ice hockey player.
- Robert D'Silva, 90, Pakistani Roman Catholic priest.
- Deo Filikunjombe, 43, Tanzanian politician, MP for Ludewa (2010–2015), helicopter crash.
- Sergei Filippenkov, 44, Russian football player (CSKA Moscow) and coach, heart attack.
- Yoshihiko Funazaki, 70, Japanese writer.
- Nate Huffman, 40, American basketball player (Toronto Raptors, Maccabi Tel Aviv), bladder cancer.
- Harriet Klausner, 63, American book reviewer.
- Don Livingstone, 67, Australian politician, Queensland MLA for Ipswich West (1989–1998, 2001–2006), stomach cancer.
- Dölf Mettler, 81, Swiss yodeler and painter.
- Joël Gustave Nana Ngongang, 33, Cameroonian LGBT rights activist.
- Neill Sheridan, 93, American baseball player (Boston Red Sox), pneumonia.
- J. Robert Stassen, 88, American politician, member of the Minnesota Senate (1973–1976), Alzheimer's disease and dementia.
- Michael Stevens, 48, American television producer (Kennedy Center Honors), stomach cancer.
- Stella Sutherland, 91, Scottish poet.
- Kenneth D. Taylor, 81, Canadian diplomat, Ambassador to Iran (1977–1980), awarded U.S. Congressional Gold Medal for role in "Canadian Caper", colorectal cancer.
- Carlos Brilhante Ustra, 83, Brazilian military officer, cancer.
- Larry N. Vanderhoef, 74, American biochemist, Chancellor of UC Davis (1994–2009), complications from ischemic strokes.
- Col Westaway, 79, Australian cricketer.
- Tyrone Young, 55, American football player (New Orleans Saints), multiple myeloma.

=== 16 ===
- Bernie Agrons, 93, American politician.
- Ralph Andrews, 87, American television producer (You Don't Say!, Liar's Club, Lingo), Alzheimer's disease.
- Mikhail Burtsev, 59, Russian Soviet fencer, six-time world champion, two-time Olympic champion (1976, 1980).
- Richard J. Cardamone, 90, American judge, member of the Second Circuit Court of Appeals (since 1981).
- Francesc de Paula Burguera, 87, Spanish journalist and politician, member of the Congress of Deputies (1977–1979).
- David Drew, 77, English ballet dancer.
- Ted Ewing, 83, American politician.
- James W. Fowler, 75, American theologian and pastoral psychologist, complications related to Alzheimer's disease.
- Marge Frantz, 93, American activist and academic.
- Luciano García Alén, 87, Spanish physician and ethnographer.
- Joseph E. Irenas, 75, American judge, member of the US District Court for New Jersey (since 1992), fall.
- William James, 85, Australian soldier and military physician.
- Neville Jason, 81, English actor (Maigret, The Duellists, From Russia with Love).
- John Jennings, 61, American musician and music producer, kidney cancer.
- Olimpo López, 97, Colombian pastry chef.
- Barbara Orzechowska-Ryszel, 84, Polish Olympic fencer (1960).
- Beny Primm, 87, American physician, HIV/AIDS researcher and activist, kidney disease.
- Irwin Schiff, 87, American tax protester, lung cancer.
- Memduh Ün, 95, Turkish film director.
- Vera Williams, 88, American children's writer.
- Julia Wilson-Dickson, 66, English dialect coach (Braveheart, The Theory of Everything, Chocolat), brain haemorrhage.

=== 17 ===
- Lois Bellman, 89, American baseball player (AAGPBL).
- Danièle Delorme, 89, French actress.
- Johnny Hamilton, 66, Scottish footballer (Hibernian, Rangers, St Johnstone).
- Howard Kendall, 69, English football player and manager (Blackburn Rovers, Everton, Athletic Bilbao).
- Anne-Marie Lizin, 66, Belgian politician, President of the Senate (2004–2007).
- Manoel, 62, Brazilian footballer.
- Morando Morandini, 91, Italian film critic and author.
- Houston Ridge, 71, American football player (San Diego Chargers).
- Peter Sands, 91, Irish politician.
- Tom Smith, 67, American politician.
- Emory Tate, 56, American chess player, heart attack.
- Algy Thomas, 75, Welsh rugby union player.
- Rosa Tschudi, 91, Swiss chef and author.
- Norman Vickar, 98, Canadian politician.

=== 18 ===
- Franklin April, 31, Namibian footballer, asthma attack.
- André Bourgeois, 87, Belgian politician, Minister of Agriculture (1992–1995).
- Ignazio Cannavò, 93, Italian Roman Catholic prelate, Archbishop of Messina-Lipari-Santa Lucia del Mela (1986–1997).
- Kallu Chidambaram, 70, Indian comedy actor.
- Robert Dickerson, 91, Australian artist, cancer.
- Gamal al-Ghitani, 70, Egyptian author, respiratory complications.
- Robert W. Farquhar, 83, American NASA mission design specialist.
- Walter S. Graf, 98, American cardiologist.
- Bruce Hansen, 54, American football player (New England Patriots).
- Brian Hurn, 76, Australian cricketer (South Australia).
- Jack Johnson, 81, American football player (Chicago Bears, Buffalo Bills).
- Héctor Mario López Fuentes, 85, Guatemalan general, prostate cancer.
- Ankaralı Namık, 38, Turkish folk singer, fall.
- Tommy O'Keefe, 87, American basketball player (Washington Capitols, Baltimore Bullets) and coach (Georgetown Hoyas).
- Anita Sarko, 68, American DJ and journalist, suicide by hanging.
- Loren P. Thompson, 88, American politician.
- Harry Verran, 85, Canadian politician, MP for South West Nova (1993–1997).
- Frank Watkins, 47, American bassist (Obituary, Gorgoroth), cancer.
- Paul West, 85, British-born American novelist and poet, pneumonia.

=== 19 ===
- Bill Collier, 94, Australian rugby league player (St. George Dragons).
- Bill Daley, 96, American football player.
- Ron Greener, 81, English footballer (Darlington).
- Ena Kadic, 26, Bosnian-born Austrian model, fall.
- Patricia Kern, 88, British mezzo-soprano and voice teacher.
- Fleming Mackell, 86, Canadian ice hockey player (Toronto Maple Leafs, Boston Bruins).
- Alessandro Plotti, 83, Italian Roman Catholic prelate, Archbishop of Pisa (1986–2008).
- Dick Sharples, 88, British scriptwriter.
- Ali Treki, 78, Libyan diplomat, Foreign Minister (1976–1982, 1984–1986), President of the United Nations General Assembly (2009–2010).
- D. C. Wilcutt, 92, American basketball player (St. Louis Bombers).
- Roland R. Wright, 96, American Mormon missionary.

=== 20 ===
- Makis Dendrinos, 65, Greek basketball player and coach, complications from a heart attack.
- Rufus Granderson, 79, American football player.
- Arno Gruen, 92, German-born American psychologist.
- Neeltje Karelse, 89, Dutch Olympic track-and-field athlete (1948).
- Gilberto Jiménez Narváez, 78, Colombian Roman Catholic prelate, Bishop of Riohacha (1996–2001).
- Kazimierz Łaski, 93, Polish-born Austrian economist.
- Yoná Magalhães, 80, Brazilian actress, complications following heart surgery.
- Juan Negri, 90, Chilean footballer.
- Brian Oliver, 86, Australian Olympic athlete (1956).
- Syed Zahoor Qasim, 88, Indian marine biologist.
- Don Rendell, 89, English jazz musician.
- Sir John Scott, 84, New Zealand medical researcher, President of the Royal Society of New Zealand (1997–2000).
- Ian Steel, 86, Scottish racing cyclist.
- K. S. L. Swamy, 77, Indian film director and singer, National Film Award for Best Children's Film (1989).
- Jane Wardle, 64, British clinical psychologist, cancer.
- Cory Wells, 74, American singer (Three Dog Night), complications from multiple myeloma.

=== 21 ===
- Peter Baldwin, 82, British actor (Coronation Street).
- Piercarlo Beroldi, 87, Italian Olympic sports shooter.
- France Bučar, 92, Slovene politician, Speaker of the National Assembly (1990–1992).
- Gregory Robert Choppin, 87, American nuclear chemist.
- E. Virgil Conway, 85, American civil servant.
- Marty Ingels, 79, American actor (I'm Dickens, He's Fenster, Pac-Man), stroke.
- Jim Jodat, 61, American football player, cancer.
- Suryanath U. Kamath, 78, Indian historian.
- Francis Kiddle, 73, British philatelist, lung cancer.
- Simo Kuismanen, 83, Finnish Olympic sprint canoeist.
- Ossie Langfelder, 89, Austrian-born American politician, Mayor of Springfield, Illinois (1987–1995).
- Rhoda Leonard, 87, American baseball player (AAGPBL).
- Homer I. Lewis, 96, American major general.
- Michael Meacher, 75, British politician, MP for Oldham West (1970–1997) and Oldham West and Royton (since 1997).
- Norman W. Moore, 92, British conservationist, researcher into the use of organochloride pesticides.
- William Murray, 8th Earl of Mansfield, 85, Scottish nobleman and politician, appointed MEP (1973–1975).
- Diana Pullein-Thompson, 90, British writer.
- Jim Robertson, 87, American baseball player (Philadelphia Athletics, Kansas City Athletics).
- Yawar Saeed, 80, Pakistani cricketer and manager, brain tumour.
- Anton Solomoukha, 69, Ukrainian-born French artist and photographer.
- Sir Christopher Walford, 80, British solicitor and politician, Lord Mayor of London (1994–1995).
- Sheldon Wolin, 93, American political theorist.

=== 22 ===
- Willem Aantjes, 92, Dutch politician, member of the House of Representatives (1959–1978).
- Çetin Altan, 88, Turkish writer and politician, MP (1965–1969).
- Murphy Anderson, 89, American comic book artist (Superman, Green Lantern, Hawkman), creator of Zatanna, heart failure.
- John Backe, 83, American television executive, President and CEO of CBS (1977–1980), heart failure.
- Scott Barr, 99, American politician, member of the Washington House of Representatives (1977–1983) and Senate (1983–1993).
- Larry Clarke, 90, Canadian businessman and Chancellor of York University (1986–1991).
- Tien Feng, 87, Chinese actor.
- Juan Ferrer, 60, Cuban judoka, Olympic silver medalist (1980).
- Esther Geller, 93, American painter.
- Jürgen Henkys, 85, German theologian.
- Labh Janjua, 57, Indian singer-songwriter, suspected heart attack.
- Louis Jung, 98, French politician, Senator for Bas-Rhin (1952–1995).
- Bryan Lowe, 89, English cricketer (Cheshire).
- Jerome Kass, 78, American screenwriter (Queen of the Stardust Ballroom), prostate cancer.
- Gorden Kelley, 77, American football player (San Francisco 49ers, Washington Redskins).
- Arnold Klein, 70, American dermatologist.
- Mark Murphy, 83, American jazz vocalist, complications from pneumonia.
- Carl Schaukowitch, 64, American football player (Denver Broncos).
- Bernard Schröter, 81, German Olympic boxer.
- Michael Margaret Stewart, 62, American lawyer, First Lady of Alaska (1986–1990), ovarian cancer.
- Mohammad Daud Sultanzoy, 63, Afghan politician, shot.
- Tomás Torres Mercado, 54, Mexican politician, member of the Senate (2006–2012), plane crash.
- John Tsitouris, 79, American baseball player (Cincinnati Reds, Kansas City Athletics).
- Jorge Valls, 82, Cuban activist and poet.
- Richard M. Wells, 85, American major general.
- Joshua Wheeler, 39, American army soldier, shot.

=== 23 ===
- Jake Bailey, 37, American make-up artist, suicide by carbon monoxide poisoning.
- Bill Berezowski, 87, Canadian football player (Hamilton Tiger-Cats, Toronto Argonauts).
- Leon Bibb, 93, American folk singer.
- John Bossy, 82, British historian.
- Michel Couriard, 61, British Channel Islander civil servant, cancer.
- Roger De Clerck, 91, Belgian chief executive (Beaulieu International Group).
- Arthur Gilbert, 94, British nonagenarian triathlete.
- Reggie Hannah, 56, American basketball player, cancer.
- Guðbjartur Hannesson, 65, Icelandic politician, cancer.
- Antony Hignell, 87, British sportsman.
- Krunoslav Hulak, 64, Croatian chess grandmaster, lung cancer.
- Roar Johansen, 80, Norwegian footballer (Fredrikstad, national team).
- Bill Keith, 75, American banjo player, cancer.
- Albert Kish, 78, Hungarian-born Canadian film director.
- Stephen Melia, 53, Irish Gaelic footballer, complications from motor neuron disease.
- Takis Papageorgopoulos, 81, Greek army general and politician.
- Peter Price, 83, Scottish footballer (Ayr United, St Mirren).
- Jim Roberts, 75, Canadian ice hockey player (Montreal Canadiens, St. Louis Blues), cancer.
- Fred Sands, 77, American real estate mogul, stroke.
- Thomas G. Stemberg, 66, American office supply executive (Staples Inc.) and philanthropist, stomach cancer.
- Paride Tumburus, 76, Italian footballer, heart attack.
- Lyubov Tyurina, 72, Russian Soviet volleyball player, Olympic champion (1972).
- Zhu Muzhi, 98, Chinese politician.

=== 24 ===
- Sir Michael Beetham, 92, British marshal of the air force, Chief of the Air Staff (1977–1982).
- Carlos Bousoño, 92, Spanish poet and literary critic.
- Alvin Bronstein, 87, American lawyer and prisoner rights activist, complications from Alzheimer's disease.
- Christopher Chapman, 88, Canadian writer, director, editor and cinematographer (A Place to Stand), creator of the multi-dynamic image technique.
- Hasset Go, 29, Filipino chef, liver cancer.
- Kirsty Howard, 20, British hospice fundraiser, complications from a kidney infection and heart attack.
- Shamshad Hussain, 69, Indian painter, liver cancer.
- Margarita Khemlin, 55, Ukrainian author.
- Edythe Kirchmaier, 107, American centenarian, oldest known Facebook user.
- Ján Chryzostom Korec, 91, Slovak Roman Catholic prelate, Jesuit Cardinal and Bishop of Nitra (1990–2005).
- Eteiwi Majali, 64–65, Jordanian politician, member of the House of Representatives (since 2013).
- Will McLean, 58, American fantasy artist, esophageal cancer.
- Maureen O'Hara, 95, Irish-American actress (How Green Was My Valley, Miracle on 34th Street, The Quiet Man).
- Nat Peck, 90, American jazz trombonist.
- Sandra Peterson, 79, American politician, member of the Minnesota House of Representatives (2005–2013).
- Gaston Poulain, 88, French Roman Catholic prelate, Bishop of Périgueux (1988–2004).
- William John Quinn, 104, American railroad executive.
- Bhaskar Save, 93, Indian farmer and activist.
- Thomas Sunesson, 56, Swedish footballer (Malmö FF).
- Ryszard Wcisło, 82, Polish scout leader.

=== 25 ===
- Cao Ying, 92, Chinese translator of Russian literature.
- David Cesarani, 58, British Jewish historian, Holocaust specialist, complications from spinal surgery.
- Fehmi Demir, 58, Turkish politician, leader of the Rights and Freedoms Party, traffic collision.
- Wojciech Fangor, 92, Polish artist.
- Pijush Ganguly, 50, Indian actor, multiple organ failure following traffic collision.
- Ken Graveney, 90, English cricketer (Gloucestershire).
- Marlo Henderson, 67, American session guitarist.
- Lisa Jardine, 71, British early modern historian, cancer.
- Vladimír Kobranov, 88, Czech ice hockey player, Olympic silver medalist (1948).
- Cecil Lolo, 27, South African footballer (Ajax Cape Town), traffic collision.
- Dennis Morgan, 63, American football player (Dallas Cowboys), heart attack.
- Georg Müller, 64, German-born Norwegian Roman Catholic prelate, Bishop of Trondheim (1997–2009).
- Flip Saunders, 60, American basketball coach (Detroit Pistons, Washington Wizards, Minnesota Timberwolves), lymphoma.
- Lee Shaw, 89, American jazz pianist.
- Asa T. Spaulding Jr., 81, American politician.
- Matt Watson, 79, Scottish footballer (Kilmarnock).
- Basil Williams, 65, Jamaican cricketer (West Indies), heart attack.

=== 26 ===
- Willis Carto, 89, American white supremacist and Holocaust denier, founder of the American Free Press.
- S. Barry Cooper, 72, British mathematician, computational theorist, author and activist.
- Robert P. DeVecchi, 85, American rescue foundation executive, Director of International Rescue Committee.
- Peter Farquhar, 69, English novelist, homicide.
- Steve Goss, 65, American politician, member of the North Carolina Senate (2006–2010), cancer.
- Zeke Hogeland, 89, American college basketball coach (Northern Iowa).
- Penelope Houston, 88, British film critic, editor of Sight & Sound (1956–1990).
- Leo Kadanoff, 78, American physicist (University of Chicago), President of American Physical Society (2006–2008), respiratory failure.
- Robert Light, 88, American politician, member of the New Mexico House of Representatives (1985–1996).
- Keith McNamara, 87, American politician.
- Giuseppe Nazzaro, 77, Italian-born Syrian Roman Catholic prelate, Vicar Apostolic of Aleppo (2002–2013).
- David Rodriguez, 63, American singer-songwriter.
- Sam Sarpong, 40, British-born American model and actor (Love Don't Cost a Thing, Farm House, Anchor Baby), suicide by jumping.
- Ed Walker, 83, American radio personality (Joy Boys), cancer.

=== 27 ===
- Farag Ali, 52, Egyptian Olympic wrestler.
- Eric Allen, 66, American football player (Toronto Argonauts, Michigan State).
- Mitzura Arghezi, 90, Romanian actress, journalist and politician, MP (1996–2004).
- Helen Astin, 83, Greek-born American scholar and feminist.
- Ayerdhal, 56, French author, cancer.
- Ranjit Roy Chaudhury, 84, Indian pharmacologist.
- Betsy Drake, 92, American actress and writer.
- Philip French, 82, British film critic (The Observer) and BBC radio producer, heart attack.
- Herbie Goins, 76, American R&B singer.
- Henry Hook, 60, American crossword compiler.
- Miyu Matsuki, 38, Japanese voice actress, lymphoma due to chronic active EBV infection.
- Tshepo Ngwane, 39, South African actor.
- Gulam Noon, Baron Noon, 79, Indian-born British food production businessman, chancellor of University of East London, liver cancer.
- Noriyoshi Ohrai, 79, Japanese illustrator, pneumonia.
- Stanley Philips, 95, English cricketer.
- Rajendra Singh Rana, 54, Indian politician, Uttar Pradesh MLA for Deoband (2002–2007, 2012–2015), cancer.
- Ralph Richeson, 63, American actor (Deadwood, Hancock), heart failure.
- Rose Tobias Shaw, 97, Polish-born American casting director (The Jewel of the Nile, Equus, The Wild Geese).
- Yoshito Takamine, 89, American politician and labor leader, member of the Hawaii House of Representatives (1959–1984).
- Tillman, 10, American skateboarding English bulldog, heart disease.
- Irving Ungerman, 92, Canadian boxing manager (George Chuvalo, Clyde Gray), promoter, poultry executive and philanthropist, stroke.

=== 28 ===
- Pazuzu Algarad, 36–37, American murderer, suicide by exsanguination.
- Peter Barrett, 59, Irish Anglican prelate, Bishop of Cashel and Ossory (2002–2006).
- Jack A. Brown, 86, American politician, member of the Arizona House of Representatives (1963–1974, 1987–1996, 2005–2011) and Senate (1999–2004).
- Diane Charlemagne, 51, British singer (Urban Cookie Collective), cancer.
- Joseph Dergham, 85, Lebanese-born Egyptian Maronite Catholic hierarch, Bishop of Cairo (1989–2005).
- Nancy Dye, 56, American historian and educator, President of Oberlin College (1994–2007).
- Bruce L. Edwards, 63, American literary scholar, expert on C.S. Lewis, ruptured aortic aneurysm.
- Nicolás Fuentes, 74, Peruvian footballer (national team), pulmonary failure as a complication of diabetes.
- Tom Hosier, 73, American college football coach (Eureka, Macalester, Winona State).
- Attila Kálmán, 77, Hungarian educator and politician, MP (1990–1994).
- Terry Kershaw, 63, American sociologist.
- Monte B. Miller, 85, American lieutenant general.
- Sir Gerry Neale, 74, British politician, MP for North Cornwall (1979–1992).
- Gyang Pwajok, 48, Nigerian politician, member of the Senate for Plateau (2012–2015), complications from hepatocellular carcinoma.
- Jorge Scarso, 99, Italian-born Brazilian Roman Catholic prelate, Bishop of Patos de Minas (1967–1992).
- Tadeusz Sobolewicz, 92, Polish actor and author, survivor of Nazi concentration camps.
- Scott James Wells, 54, American actor (Superboy) and model.

=== 29 ===
- Nick Bolkovac, 87, American football player (Pittsburgh Steelers) .
- Per Brunvand, 78, Norwegian newspaper editor.
- Luther Burden, 62, American basketball player (Virginia Squires, New York Knicks), heart failure.
- Jacques Delécluse, 82, French percussionist.
- Kenneth Gilbert, 84, British actor (Doctor Who, House of Cards).
- Kunishirō Hayashi, 76, Japanese actor, pancreatic cancer.
- Ernesto Herrera, 73, Filipino politician, member of the House of Representatives (1998–2001) and Senate (1987–1998), heart attack.
- Tassie Johnson, 77, Australian football player (Melbourne).
- Peter Knott, 59, Australian politician, member of the House of Representatives for Gilmore (1993–1996).
- Lowell B. Komie, 87, American lawyer and author.
- Boris Kristančič, 82, Slovene Olympic basketball player (1960) and coach.
- Oddvar Kruge, 89, Norwegian footballer.
- James Luther Mays, 94, American Old Testament scholar.
- Franz Thaler, 90, Italian author.
- Ranko Žeravica, 85, Serbian basketball coach (Partizan).

=== 30 ===
- Abdullah al-Dafa'i, 55-56, Yemeni politician.
- Richard Amidon, 87, American politician.
- Mel Daniels, 71, American Hall of Fame basketball player (Indiana Pacers).
- Haliru Dantoro, 77, Nigerian traditional ruler and politician, Emir of Borgu (since 2000), member of the Senate (1993).
- Zehra Deović, 76, Bosnian sevdalinka folk singer.
- Wallace Dollase, 78, American horse trainer.
- Joel Elkes, 101, American medical researcher.
- Jean Ferris, 76, American author (Love Among the Walnuts), complications from acute myeloid leukemia.
- Colin Hilton, 78, English cricketer (Lancashire).
- Beverly Long, 95, American activist.
- John McCollum, 93, American opera singer.
- Al Molinaro, 96, American actor (The Odd Couple, Happy Days, Joanie Loves Chachi), complications from infected gall bladder.
- Lucídio Portela Nunes, 93, Brazilian politician, Governor of Piauí (1979–1983).
- Wallace E. Oates, 78, American economist.
- Sinan Şamil Sam, 41, German-born Turkish professional boxer, liver failure.
- Double Shah, 51, Pakistani fraudster.
- Norm Siebern, 82, American baseball player (Kansas City Athletics, New York Yankees, Baltimore Orioles).

=== 31 ===
- Ants Antson, 76, Estonian speed skater, Olympic champion (1964).
- Thomas Blatt, 88, Polish writer and Holocaust survivor following escape from Sobibór, complications from dementia.
- Sergio Donadoni, 101, Italian Egyptologist.
- Patricia Farrar, 84, American educator, First Lady of South Dakota (1969–1971), Parkinson's disease and Lewy body dementia.
- Ivan Frgić, 62, Serbian Yugoslav Olympic silver medallist wrestler (1976).
- Howard Green, 90, Canadian-American physician and clinical researcher (MIT, Harvard Medical School), pioneer in skin regeneration, respiratory failure.
- Hroar Hansen, 68, Norwegian politician, newspaper owner and editor (Morgenbladet).
- Charles Herbert, 66, American actor (Wagon Train, 13 Ghosts, The Fly), heart attack.
- Tadeusz Jodłowski, 90, Polish artist.
- Pinky Kravitz, 88, American radio broadcaster (WOND).
- Dick Lane, 88, American politician, member of the Georgia House of Representatives (1966–1994).
- George K. Larsen, 77, American politician.
- Colin Nicholson, 79, New Zealand lawyer and jurist, judge of the High Courts of New Zealand (1998–2009) and the Cook Islands (2005–2012).
- Ryūzō Saki, 78, Japanese writer, throat cancer.
- Gus Savage, 90, American newspaper executive and politician, member of the U.S. House of Representatives for Illinois's 2nd district (1981–1993).
- David Shugar, 100, Polish-born Canadian physicist.
- Benjamin Drake Wright, 89, American psychometrician.
- T. M. Wright, 68, American author, Parkinson's disease.
