= Papageorgopoulos =

Papageorgopoulos (Greek: Παπαγεωργόπουλος) is a Greek surname. It may refer to:

- Alkiviadis Papageorgopoulos (born 1937), Greek athlete
- Takis Papageorgopoulos (1934–2015), Greek general and politician
- Vasilis Papageorgopoulos (born 1947), Greek athlete and politician

== See also ==
- Papageorgiou
