= Pazuzu (disambiguation) =

Pazuzu was king of the demons of the wind in ancient Mesopotamian religion.

Pazuzu may also refer to:

== Fictional characters ==
- Pazuzu (The Exorcist), in The Exorcist horror novels and film series
- Pazuzu (Dungeons & Dragons), in the Dungeons & Dragons role-playing game
- Pazuzu (Futurama), a recurring Futurama character
- Pazuzu, in the 2015 movie Sisters
- Pazuzu, in the video game Final Fantasy Mystic Quest
- Pazuzu, in the video game Hell: A Cyberpunk Thriller
- Pazuzu, in the video game Digital Devil Story: Megami Tensei II
- Pazuzu, in Rage of Bahamut (anime)
- Pazuzu, a character in the Tower of Druaga franchise
- Pazuzu, in the 2010 TV sitcom Neighbors from Hell
- Pazuzu, several Ultraman Gaia characters
- Pazuzu, a lieutenant of Lucifer (Prince of Darkness) in the Marvel universe
- Pazuzu, in the Cyborg 009 VS Devilman anime
- Suzy Pazuzu, in Howard the Duck comic stories

== Music ==
- Pazuzu (band), an Austrian band, predecessor of Summoning (band)
- "Pazuzu (Black Rain)", a song by The Nefilim from the 1996 album Zoon
- "Pazuzu", a song by Behemoth from the 2007 album The Apostasy
- "Pazuzu For The Win", a song by Iwrestledabearonce from the 2009 album It's All Happening

== Film ==
- Alternative title of the 1975 film Pick-Up

== See also ==
- Pazuza, nickname of Stafford Simon (1908–1960), an American jazz saxophonist
- Pazuzu Algarad (1978–2015), American murderer
- Oranssi Pazuzu, a Finnish band
