= Steven Mosher =

Stephen or Steven Mosher is the name of:

- Steven W. Mosher (born 1948), social scientist, demographer, China scholar, and author
- Stephen Mosher (photographer) (born 1964), American photographer
- Steven M. Mosher, climatologist, technologist, statistician, and author
