= Papageorgiou =

Papageorgiou (Greek: Παπαγεωργίου) is a Greek surname. It may refer to one of the following people:

- Alexandra Papageorgiou (born 1980), Greek female athlete
- Christos Papageorgiou (disambiguation), several people
- Evangeline Papageorge (originally Papageorgiou) (1906–2001), American biochemist
- George Papageorgiou (born c.1958), Greek-American football player and coach in the United States
- Kostas Papageorgiou (1945–2021), Greek poet and critic
- Kostas Papageorgiou, footballer born 1941.
- Konstantinos Papageorgiou, footballer born 1995.
- Michail Papageorgiou (1727–1796), Greek philosopher
