= Peter G. Jordan =

American academic administrator

Peter G. Jordan is the president of Tarrant County College, a community college in Tarrant County, Texas. Formerly, he served as the vice chancellor of CUNY, as well as vice president of Vaughn College of Aeronautics and Technology and vice president of LaGuardia Community College. He was also a dean at New York Institute of Technology, and at Adelphi University. He served as an overseer and trustee for Colby College. He holds a bachelor's degree from Colby College, an MSC from Polytechnic Institute of New York University, and a PhD from the University of Pennsylvania.
