= Noël Goemanne =

Belgian-born composer and musician (1926–2010)

- Born: 10 December 1926; Poperinge, Flemish Community, Belgium
- Died: 12 January 2010 (aged 83); Dallas, Texas, US
- Education: Lemmensinstituut; Royal Conservatory of Liège
- Occupations: Organist; choirmaster; composer
- Years active: 1940s–2010

Noël Goemanne (10 December 1926, Poperinge – 12 January 2010, Dallas) was a Belgian-born musician, who in 1952 emigrated to the United States, where he made a name for himself as an organist, as a choirmaster, and as a composer, especially of sacred music.

== Education ==
Goemanne began studying music at the age of six and obtained his first music degrees magna cum laude from a so-called "central examination board". He then studied full-time at the Lemmensinstituut, where he had renowned teachers, among them composer Marinus De Jong, choirmaster Jules Van Nuffel, and organist Flor Peeters, and at the Royal Conservatory of Liège, where he his teachers included Pierre Froidebise and Charles Hens. Subsequently, he studied for two more years with Flor Peeters as a private student.

== In Belgium ==
During World War II, Nazi occupiers tried to persuade him to become a composer for the Third Reich, but he refused. He was later arrested for playing music by Felix Mendelssohn, a Jewish composer, in public. His wartime experiences turned him into a committed pacifist, which was reflected in his demand, to which he adhered until the end of his life, that his singers sing the "Dona nobis pacem" ('Grant us peace'), the final words of the Agnus Dei, with all the power they had.

Between 1950 and 1952, he was a regular piano recitalist for the Namur station of the Belgian National Broadcasting Institute, and from 1949 to 1952, he was organist and choirmaster at Rochefort. He soon realized, though, that Europe had a surfeit of organists. Newly married, he emigrated to the US in 1952.

== In the US ==
In the US, he was active as a choirmaster and organist of a number of Catholic churches in Victoria, Texas; Detroit; Birmingham, Alabama; and Dallas, where he served at Christ the King Catholic Church from 1972 to the end of his life.

He also taught music in various places, including the Palestrina Institute for Sacred Music in Detroit, Saint John's University, Saint Joseph's College and Tarrant County Junior College. He also gave workshops on sacred music in a number of colleges and universities during the 1960s.

As a composer, he wrote over 200 sacred compositions, a number of them occasioned by the changes in Roman Catholic liturgy following the second Vatican Council. He was the first to compose masses in English that were approved for the liturgy, but his 20-plus masses are not all in English, for he often combined English and Latin texts in his masses. In 1987, he was commissioned to write the processional for the mass celebrated by Pope John Paul II during his visit to San Antonio, Texas; this was Goemanne's Fanfare and Concertato on 'All Creatures of Our God and King'.

He had his works published by various publishing houses, two of which, GIA Publications and World Library Publications (WLP, the music and liturgy division of the J.S. Paluch company; in Goemanne's time called "World Library of Sacred Music") deserve special mention, as they still (2018) retain dozens of his works in their catalogs. This indicates that they are still performed quite regularly.

== Private life ==
Goemanne was married to Janine Marloye, by whom he had three children.

== Honors ==
In addition to a number of ASCAP awards, Goemanne received:

- the award from the Institute of Sacred Music, Manila, the Philippines (1974)
- the Pro Ecclesia et Pontifice Medal, awarded by Pope Paul VI in 1977 for his contributions to church music
- an honorary degree of Doctor of Sacred Music, awarded by Saint Joseph’s College, Rensselaer, for establishing its sacred music program
- an honorary doctorate, awarded by Madonna University (1999)

== Sources ==
All websites cited here or in the Notes were consulted in September 2018.

- "Noël Goemanne", obituary in The Dallas Morning News, January 15, 2010; also available here. The main source of this article.

Other biographies:

- GIA Publications - Noël Goemanne
- Alliance Music Publications - Noël Goemanne
- "In Memoriam: Nöel Goemanne 1926–2010" in: The Choral Journal (Oklahoma City), Vol. 50, Iss. 9 (Apr 2010), p. 94; also available here
