= Jim Dobbin (Canadian football) =

Canadian football player

Profile
- Position: Halfback

Personal information
- Born: July 8, 1927
- Died: October 13, 2015 (aged 88)
- Listed height: 5 ft 9 in (1.75 m)
- Listed weight: 172 lb (78 kg)

Career history
- 1948: Calgary Stampeders

Awards and highlights
- Grey Cup champion (1948)

James McClymont Dobbin (July 8, 1927 - October 13, 2015) was a Canadian football player who played for the Calgary Stampeders. He was part of the team that won the Grey Cup in 1948. Dobbin played junior football in Calgary with the North Hill Blizzard.
