= Alan Prince (civil servant) =

Canadian civil servant and scientist

Alan Prince (February 15, 1915 – October 2, 2015) was a Canadian civil servant and scientist who served as the Director of the Atomic Energy Control Board, now called the Canadian Nuclear Safety Commission (CNSC), from 1975 to 1978. Prince oversaw the response and clean-up Kosmos 954, a Soviet nuclear powered reconnaissance satellite which broke up over western Canada on January 24, 1978, spreading radioactive debris over an area encompassing 124,000 square kilometers.

Prince is also credited with the cleanup of the Great Lakes after decades of intense water pollution. His work also led to high quality tooth fillings and a less expensive manufacturing method for bone china by encouraging the study of "phase equilibrium" of calcium, a process used to create tricalcium phosphate.
