= Jean-Jacques Tillmann =

Swiss news reporter

Jean-Jacques Tillmann (1935 – 1 October 2015) was a Swiss news reporter.

Born in Geneva, Tillman studied in Nyon, Geneva, and Athens, after which he began reporting for Télévision Suisse Romande in 1963. He specialized in soccer and sports in general. He died on 1 October 2015 in Lausanne.
