= Tord Johansson =

Swedish businessman

Tord Gustav Allan Johansson (10 September 1955 – 10 October 2015) was a Swedish businessman.

Born in Mörlunda, Kalmar County, Sweden, Johansson founded the listed companies ITAB Shop Concept AB, Xano Industri AB and Ages Industri AB. He was chairman ITAB and Xano and director of Ages.

From 1976 until his death, Johansson was married to Helene Eriksson (born 1955). He died in Jönköping Sofia Järstorp, Jönköping County in October 2015.
