= Li Yongtai =

Chinese politician, general (1928–2015)

- 李永泰
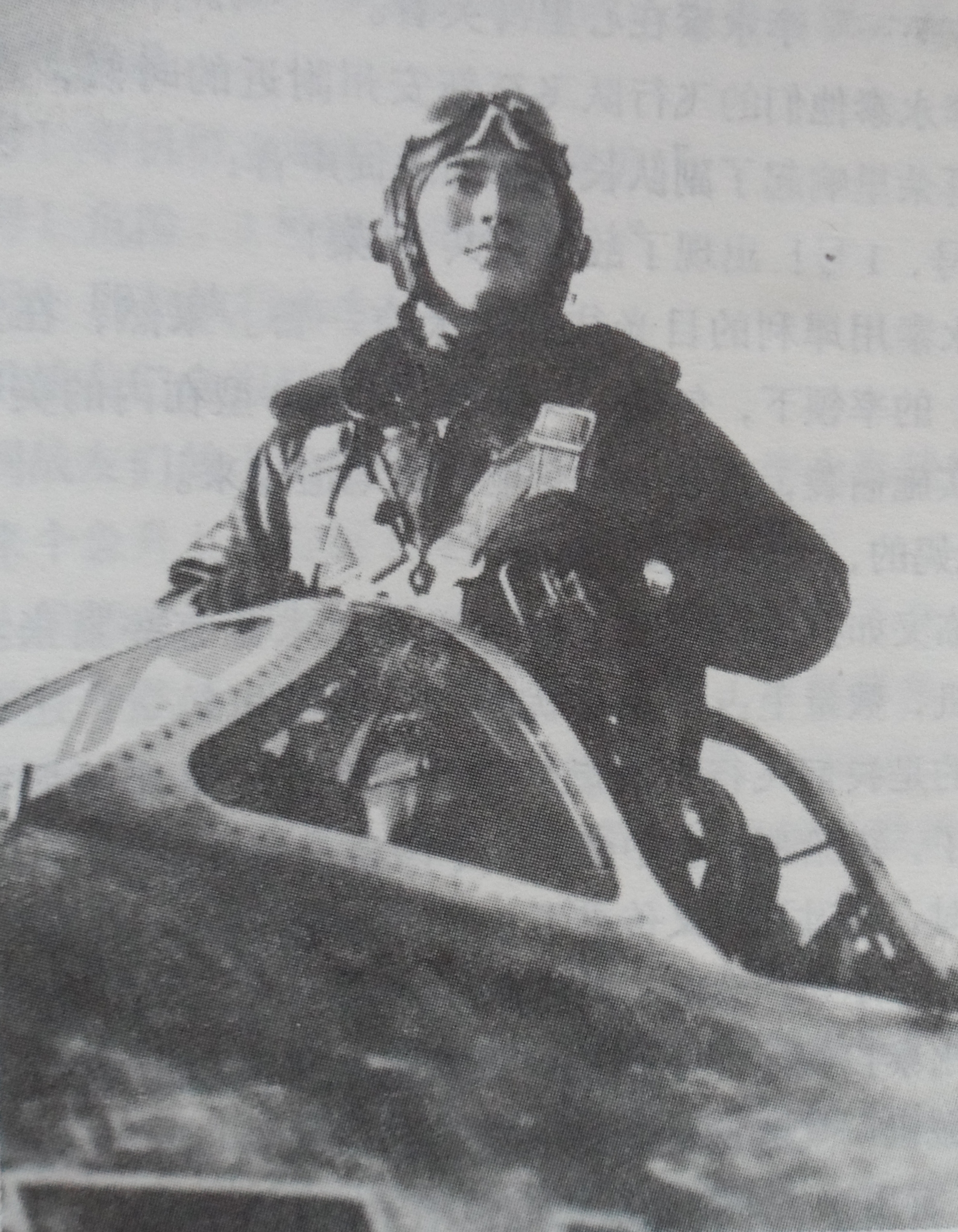

Deputy Commander of the PLA Air Force
- In office 1982–1993 Serving with Lin Hu, Liu Zhitian
- Commander: Wang Hai

Personal details
- Born: November 4, 1928 Tonghua, Jilin, China
- Died: October 5, 2015 (aged 86) Beijing
- Party: Chinese Communist Party
- Nickname: Tank in the Sky

Military service
- Allegiance: People's Republic of China
- Branch/service: People's Liberation Army Air Force
- Years of service: 1945–1993
- Rank: Lieutenant general
- Battles/wars: Korean War

Li Yongtai
- Chinese: 李永泰
Transcriptions
Standard Mandarin
- Hanyu Pinyin: Lǐ Yǒngtài

Chinese Korean name
- Chosŏn'gŭl: 리영태
- Hancha: 李永泰
Transcriptions
- Revised Romanization: Ri Yeongtae
- McCune–Reischauer: Ri Yŏngt'ae

Li Yongtai (Chinese: 李永泰; 4 November 1928 – 5 October 2015) or Lee Young-tae (Korean: 리영태) was a Chinese fighter pilot and lieutenant general of the People's Liberation Army Air Force (PLAAF). An ethnic Korean, he fought in the Korean War and later served as deputy commander of the PLAAF.

== Military career ==
Born in Tonghua, Jilin Province, China to an ethnic Korean family, Li joined the Eighth Route Army in October 1945, and became a member of the Chinese Communist Party (CCP) the following year. He began learning to fly in October 1949, and after China's entry into the Korean War, served as a member of the People's Volunteer Army Air Force. He shot down four American F-86s, earning him the nickname "tank in the sky". After the war he continued his rise through the ranks, and in 1975, was named commander of the Wuhan Military Region Air Force. From 1982 to 1993, he served as deputy commander of the PLAAF. He was awarded the rank of lieutenant general in 1988.

== Political career ==
Li served as a delegate to the 10th and 12th National Congresses of the CCP, and to the 5th, 7th, 8th, 9th, and 10th National People's Congresses (NPC). In the 8th and the 9th Congresses he was named a member of the NPC Standing Committee, and also served on the NPC Ethnic Affairs Committee.
