= Luciano García Alén =

Spanish physician and ethnographer

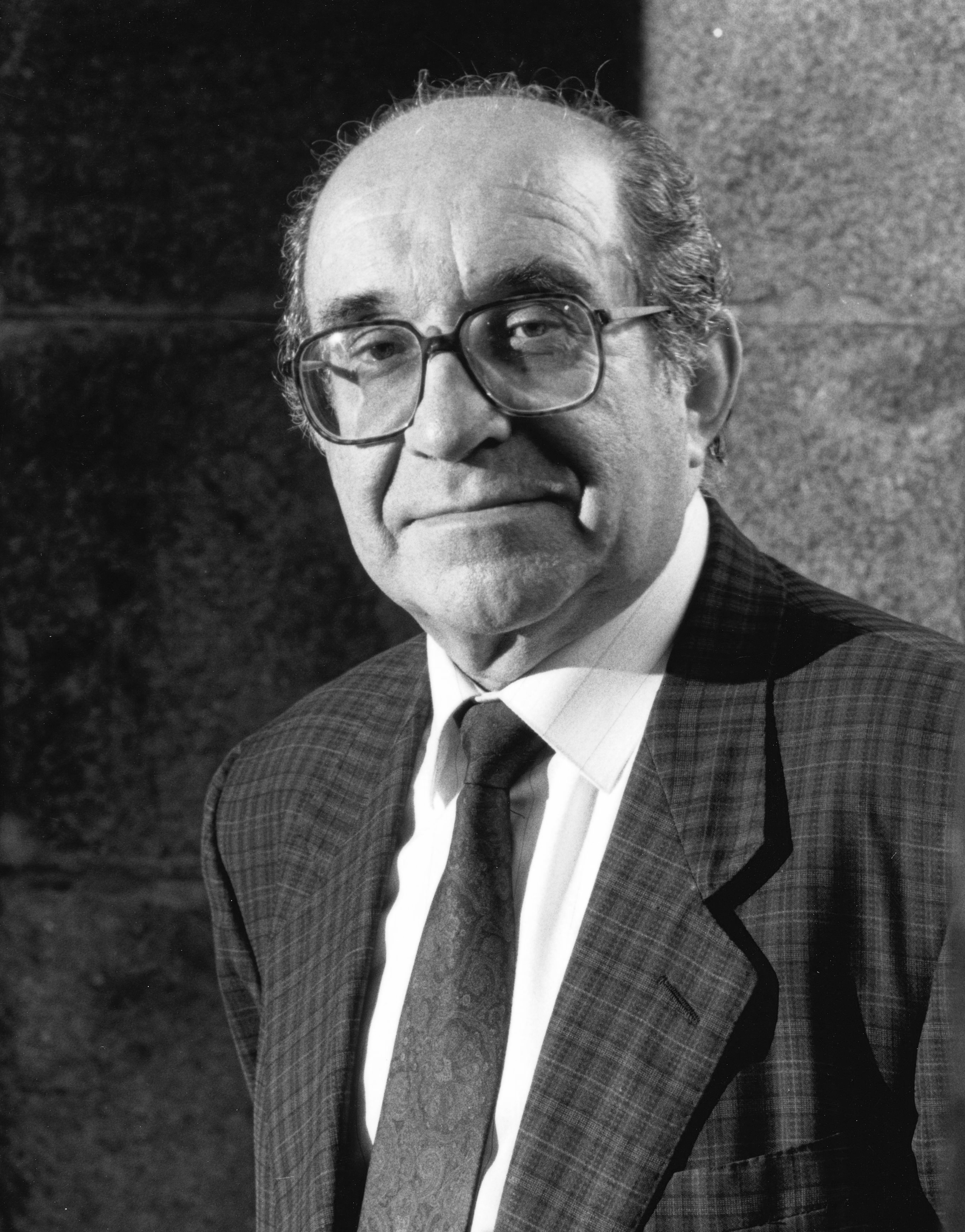
García Alén in 1968

Luciano García Alén (25 May 1928 – 16 October 2015) was a Spanish physician and ethnographer, known for his studies of Galician culture. He was born in Pontevedra, Galicia, Spain to Alfredo García Hermida. His brother Alfredo García Alén was a historian. García Alén died in Santiago de Compostela, Galicia, Spain, aged 87.

García Alén died in Santiago de Compostela, Galicia, Spain, aged 87.

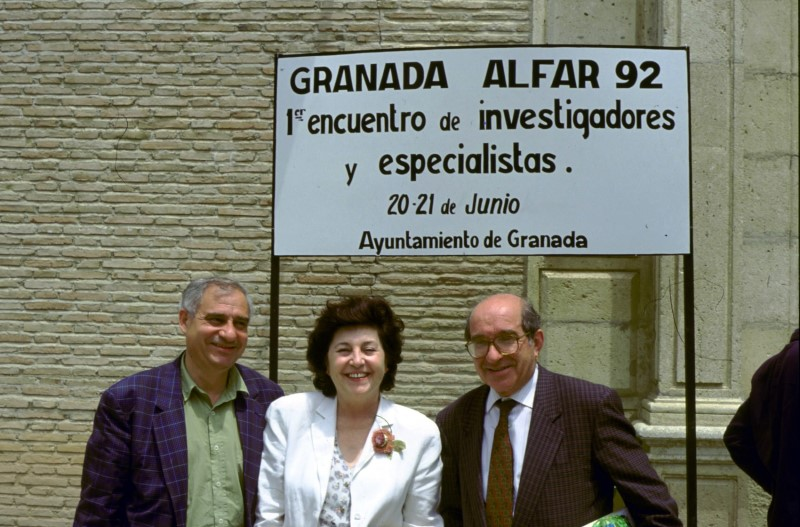
Emili-Natacha-Garcia Alen
