= Rosa Tschudi =

Swiss chef and author (1924–2015)

Rosa Tschudi (21 April 1924 – 17 October 2015) was a Swiss chef and author. The national daily newspaper Tages-Anzeiger has called her the "Grand Dame" of Swiss gastronomy. Tschudi, a pioneering female chef in Switzerland, was awarded several Michelin stars during her career, which spanned 70 years and cooked for Queen Elizabeth II in 1991.

== Restaurants owned ==
Rosa Tschudi was the owner of Hotel Krone in Gottlieben, Switzerland from 1968 to 1981. She then acquired restaurant Bären in Nürensdorf and Restaurant Tschudi in Gockhausen, named after herself. In 1995 she took on Restaurant"Gian Grossi"in Zürich, which she managed right up to her retirement in 1997.

== Awards & Achievements ==
Rosa Tschudi received two Michelin Stars, one during her time at Restaurant"Tschudi", which was the first Michelin Star in Zurich Gastronomy, and one star at"Gian Grossi". Gault Millau awarded her with 17 points on numerous occasions. She was a guest chef in several international kitchens, from Buenos Aires to Kairo over Hong Kong to Brisbane, and cooked for numerous dignitaries, including Queen Elizabeth II in 1991. Rosa Tschudi was also selected as one of the 15 chefs, cooking for the 70th birthday of Prince Philip, together with Anton Mosimann. Tschudi's specialty was a hearty local cuisine with "Haute Niveau", for example, "Fisch-Chnusperli", which is a Swiss dish of freshwater fish in beer batter, or Schwartenmagen. She also excelled at simple traditional dishes, such as marinated pot roast according to grandmother's recipe or handmade veal ravioli. A style of cooking which earned her the nickname "Grand Dame" of Helvetic cuisine. In 1993 Tschudi created the menu for the First- Class cabin of Swissair.

== Published books ==
- Erfolgsrezepte aus meiner Küche. AT Verlag, Aarau 1999, ISBN 978-3-855-02671-5. Language: German. Rosa Tschudi published her own cooking book in 1999 during her retirement. The book is still widely available and liked by cooking enthusiasts. Receipts are said to be easy to replicate at home and range from Grande Cuisine to a variety of fish dishes, soups, marinated pot roasts, calf's head, tripe and Tschudi's infamous European perch fillets.

== Personal life ==
Rosa Tschudi was a chef and business owner who was actively involved in kitchen operations. She also maintained a polished personal appearance and took an interest in fashion and jewellery outside of work.

When on holiday, Rosa Tschudi traveled across countries in order to eat at friends' places. Her favorite was Henry Levy in Berlin, who owned a legendary restaurant called Maître. Tschudi also frequently traveled for work and liked to accept invitations from five-star hotels to present their art to her. Rosa Tschudi especially liked her detours to Hong Kong, various global cities, and luxury houses.

Rosa Tschudi died on 17 October 2015, at the age of 91.
