= Lloyd Hinchberger =

Canadian ice hockey player

- Born: October 10, 1930 Trout Creek, Ontario, Canada
- Died: October 3, 2015 (aged 84) North Bay, Ontario, Canada
- Height: 6 ft 1 in (185 cm)
- Weight: 185 lb (84 kg; 13 st 3 lb)
- Position: Defense
- Shot: Left
- Played for: Washington Presidents; New Haven Blades; Nashville Dixie Flyers
- Playing career: 1948–1971

Lloyd Thomas Hinchberger (October 10, 1930 – October 3, 2015) was a Canadian professional hockey player who played 587 games in the Eastern Hockey League for the Washington Presidents, New Haven Blades, and Nashville Dixie Flyers.
