= Tarrant County College =

Community college in Tarrant County, Texas, US

- Former name: Tarrant County Junior College (1965–1999)
- Motto: Success Within Reach
- Type: Public community college
- Established: 1965
- Chancellor: Elva LeBlanc
- Administrative staff: 1,616
- Students: 40,131 (Fall 2022)
- Location: Fort Worth; Arlington; Hurst; Texas, United States
- Campus: Urban
- Colors: Burgundy, navy, tan and teal
- Mascot: Trailblazer
- Website: www.tccd.edu

Tarrant County College District (TCCD) is a public community college in Tarrant County, Texas. Commonly known as Tarrant County College, TCC offers associate degrees and certificates, academic transfer programs, technical and occupational programs, continuing education, and community classes.

The district operates 5 physical campuses in the Fort Worth metropolitan area and an online campus. As defined by the Texas Legislature, the official service area of TCCD includes all of Tarrant County.

== History ==
Tarrant County College District was founded as Tarrant County Junior College in 1965. On July 31 of that year, voters approved a countywide bond election to create the junior college district and elected the first seven-member Board of Trustees.

Among the first leaders at the new college were Joe B. Rushing, May Owen. and J. Ardis Bell. The new district acquired land for campuses soon after: a site in south Fort Worth (donated by the federal government) for the South Campus and another in Hurst for the Northeast Campus. Construction began in 1966.

The South Campus opened in fall 1967 with an enrollment of more than 4,200 students, the largest opening enrollment for a community college in the U.S. at that time. The next year, the Northeast Campus opened (though its first classes were temporarily held at South Campus due to construction delays). The first president of the Northeast Campus was Dr. Herman L. Crow, for whom the "Crow's Nest" clock tower is named.

The district continued to expand in the following decades: Northwest Campus near Lake Worth opened in 1976, Southeast Campus in Arlington opened in 1996, and the Trinity River Campus in downtown Fort Worth opened in 2009. The newest campus, TCC Connect, was established in 2015 as a fully online campus.

In 1999, the college's name was changed from Tarrant County Junior College to Tarrant County College.

== Collegiate high schools ==
Tarrant County College offers several dual-credit programs, known as collegiate high schools, that offer an associate degree along with a high school diploma.

- Marine Creek Collegiate High School (Northwest Campus)
- Texas Academy of Biomedical Sciences (Trinity River Campus)
- TCC South Campus – FWISD Early Collegiate High School (South Campus)
- Collegiate Academy at Tarrant County College (Northeast Campus)
- Arlington Collegiate High School (Southeast Campus)
- Crowley Collegiate Academy (South Campus)

== Notable people ==
=== Notable faculty and staff ===
- Euline Brock, history professor
- Reby Cary, history professor
- Janet Dunbar, music professor
- Noël Goemanne, music professor
- Erma Johnson Hadley, chancellor of Tarrant County College
- Peter G. Jordan, president of Tarrant County College
- Warren Norwood, writing professor
- Jay Saunders, music professor

=== Notable alumni ===
- Charles Baker, actor
- Leon Bridges, musician
- Deborah Crombie, author
- Wendy Davis, politician
- Montana De La Rosa, UFC mixed martial artist
- Post Malone, rapper
- Stephen Mosher, photographer
- Jonathan Stickland, businessman and politician
- Mack White, cartoonist
