= George K. Larsen =

American politician (1937–2015)

Member of the Georgia House of Representatives
- In office 1971–1976

Personal details
- Born: November 8, 1937 Duval County, Florida, U.S.
- Died: October 31, 2015 (aged 77)
- Party: Republican
- Education: Emory University; Harvard University

George K. Larsen (November 8, 1937 – October 31, 2015) was an American politician. He served as a Republican member of the Georgia House of Representatives.

== Life and career ==
Larsen was born in Duval County, Florida. He attended Emory University and Harvard University.

Larsen was a marketing representative for IBM, and served in the Georgia House of Representatives from 1971 to 1976. He died on October 31, 2015, at the age of 77.
