= Roland R. Wright =

United States Air Force general

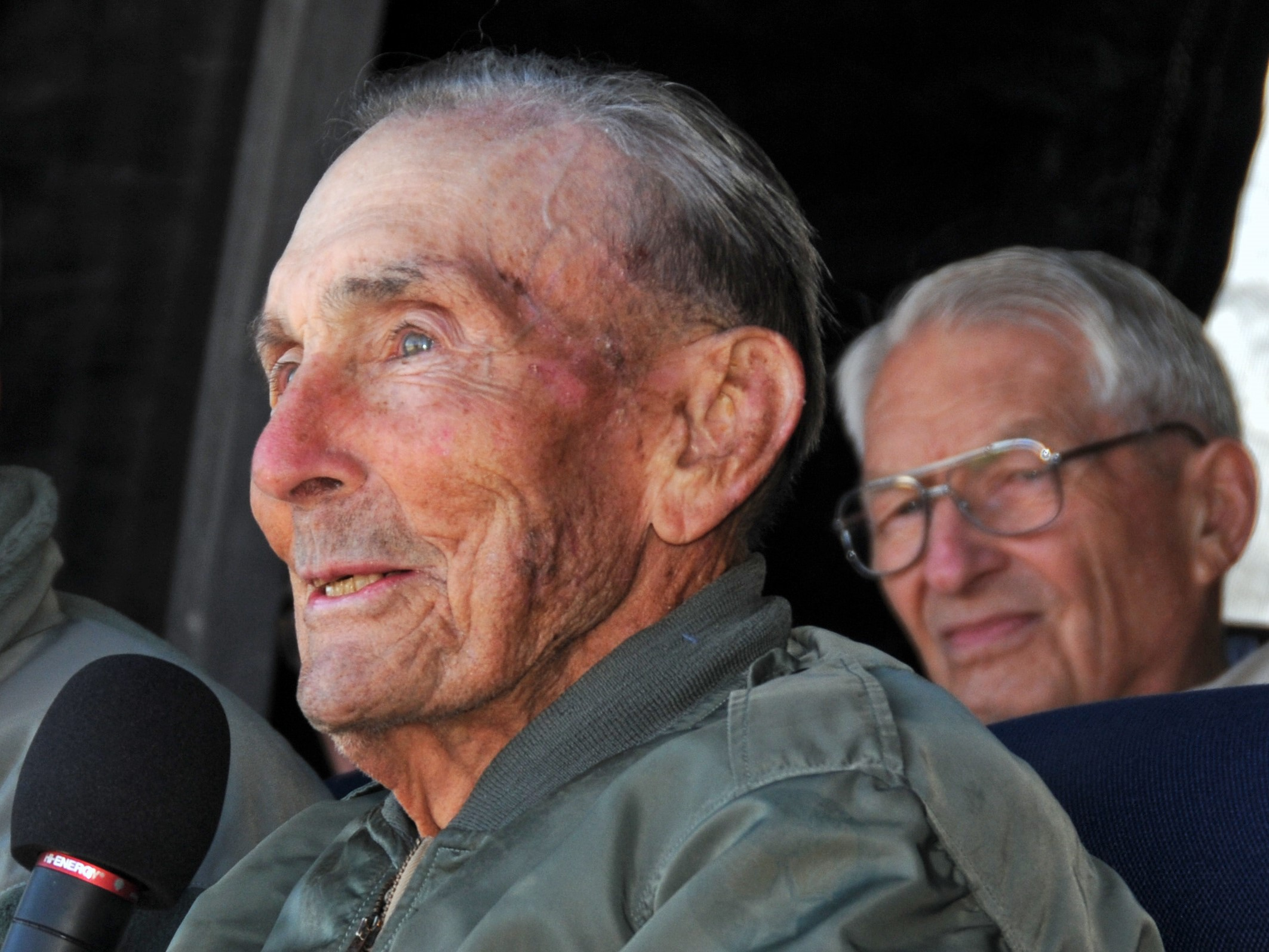
- Retired Air Force Brig. Gen. Roland R. Wright in November, 2014
- Born: April 30, 1919
- Died: October 19, 2015 (aged 96)

Roland R. Wright (30 March 1919 – 19 October 2015) was a brigadier general of the United States Air Force who was a pilot during World War II, the Korean War and the Vietnam War.

During World War II, Wright was assigned to the 364th Fighter Squadron, 357th Fighter Group where he flew the P-51 Mustang. Wright had three confirmed aerial victories, one of which was against a Me 262—the eighth to have ever been shot down. All three P-51 Mustangs he flew were dubbed the 'Mormon Mustang'. Wright eventually reached the rank of brigadier general, retiring in 1976. He was also one of the first members of the Utah Air National Guard.

Wright was a member of the Church of Jesus Christ of Latter-day Saints (LDS Church). Prior to joining the Air Force he served as a missionary in the Northern States Mission, headquartered in Chicago. After retiring, Wright served as the president of the New York New York Mission from 1977 to 1980 and as director of the Washington DC Temple Visitors Center from 1991 until 1993.

On October 18, 2014, Wright was honored by the Utah Air National Guard when the Utah Air National Guard Base was formally renamed to the Roland R. Wright Air National Guard Base. A remake of his plane currently resides at Legacy Flight Museum where it is flown by pilot John K. Bagley. Wright died in October 2015.
