= Guenther Boden =

German-born American endocrinologist

Guenther Boden (January 8, 1935 – October 13, 2015) was a German-born American endocrinologist and diabetes researcher who helped link insulin resistance with fatty acids in the blood. Boden was born in Ludwigshafen, Germany on January 8, 1935. He received an M.S. from Heidelberg University in 1956 and an M.D. from the Ludwig-Maximilians-Universität München's School of Medicine in 1959. Boden completed a doctoral thesis at the Max Planck Institute of Psychiatry in Munich in 1960. Boden completed a postdoctoral fellowship in biochemistry at the University of Tübingen in Germany in 1965. He then continued his medical practice and studies in the United States. Boden was a research fellow in Medicine at the E.P. Joslin Research Laboratory, Harvard Medical School from 1965 to 1967, where he also served as Assistant in Medicine at the Peter Bent Brigham Hospital in Boston, Massachusetts. He then assumed the position of Assistant and Associate Resident in Medicine at Rochester General Hospital.

In 1970, Boden arrived at Temple University Hospital in Philadelphia, Pennsylvania, as an assistant professor of medicine. Boden spent the next 45 years at Temple University Hospital, serving as the Chief, Section of Diabetes and Metabolism; Chief, Division of Endocrinology/Metabolism and Program Director of the General Clinical Research Center, among other positions. Boden was the recipient of numerous awards and honors and served on the editorial boards of many academic journals, including the Journal of Clinical Endocrinology and Metabolism, Clinical Diabetes and Diabetes, to name a few. He was a prolific speaker and author on topics relating to diabetes and metabolism, having published more than 230 articles and written more than 50 chapters in peer-reviewed journals and medical books.
