= Friedrich Diedrich =

Friedrich Diedrich (5 October 1935 – 7 October 2015) was a German Roman Catholic theologian and Old Testament scholar. He lived in Buer.

== Life ==
Born in Hannover in 1935, Diedrich obtained priesthood on 26 July 1962. He studied philosophy and Catholic theology in Paderborn, Innsbruck and Bonn. From 1972 to 2015, he was the assistant to Lothar Ruppert at the Ruhr University in Bochum, he earned a doctorate in the Old Testament. In the same compartment habilitation he in 1985 and was a lecturer at the University of Freiburg.

He had, until 1985, the Acting Chair, and then the full professorship for "Biblical Theology - Old Testament" at the University of Osnabrück. From 1 May 1988 to his death, he was the professor of Old Testament Studies at the Theological Faculty of the Catholic University of Eichstätt-Ingolstadt. Diedrich, from 1993 to 1995 and from 1997 to 1999, was the dean of the Faculty of Theology. On 1 April 2001 he was given emeritus status.

Diedrich was a member of the KDSt.V. Guestfalo-Silesia Paderborn in CV, and later the AV Austria Innsbruck (1958), the KDStV Ripuaria Bonn (1967), the AV Silesia Bochum (1969) and the KDStV Alcimonia Eichstätt (1990) and the Student Connection Assindia to Essen. In 1969, he was a founding member of the AV Rupert Mayer at the Sankt Georgen Graduate School of Philosophy and Theology in Frankfurt. He from, 1995 to 2005, was at the CV-pastoral office and longtime President of the Academia editorial board.
