= Frans Pointl =

Dutch writer (1933–2015)

- Born: 1 August 1933; Amsterdam, Netherlands
- Died: 1 October 2015 (aged 82); Amsterdam, Netherlands
- Occupation: Writer

Frans Pointl (1 August 1933 – 1 October 2015) was a Dutch writer.

Pointl was born in 1933 in Amsterdam, the son of a Jewish mother and an Austrian father. During World War II he went in hiding. He only began publishing later in life; his debut, De kip die over de soep vloog ("The chicken that flew over the soup"), is a collection of autobiographical stories that also describe that time. The book was an instant success and earned him a nomination for the ECI Literatuurprijs.

He spent the last years of his life in a nursing home in Amsterdam but continued to write. His last book, De laatste kamer ("The last room"), was published in 2013. He wrote of longing for death: "Being old is a chronic disease. Every night before I go to sleep I hope to slip into eternity. I've already written my epitaph: 'Finally liberated from people'". Pointl died on 1 October 2015.

== Selected bibliography ==
- Frans Pointl (31 October 2009). De kip die over de soep vloog. Singel Uitgeverijen. pp. 179–. ISBN 978-90-388-9173-6.
