= Double Shah =

Pakistani fraudster

Sibtul Hasan Shah, alias Double Shah (Urdu, Punjabi: ڈبل شاہ; 3 March 1964 – 30 October 2015), was a scam artist in Pakistan, who gained notoriety by starting and managing a Ponzi scheme.

== Early life ==
Sibtul Hasan Shah did have some college education and a Bachelor of Science degree. Originally a school science teacher until 2005, and a resident of a lower-middle-class neighborhood in Wazirabad, he was born in Koloke, a small town of Sambrial Tehsil, in Sialkot District, Punjab. Later on, he was convicted and sentenced to 14 years imprisonment. It was reported in the Pakistani newspaper, Daily Jang, that he died in prison on October 30, 2015.

After taking a leave of absence from his job, he went to Dubai where he stayed for about six months. Upon his return, he quit his job and approached his colleagues and neighbours, asking them to give him their savings, which he would return 'in double' in just 15 days. The first person to trust him was his next-door neighbour who owned a marble business named Javed Marble Factory. He was followed by many of Shah’s colleagues. As promised, their investments were indeed doubled in 15 days.

This was a Ponzi scheme where investors were offered 100% return on their investment in just 15 days, later extended to 70 days. Residents of Gujranwala, Gujrat, Wazirabad, Sialkot and Hafizabad were the cities where most of his clients were.

== How the scheme works ==
Like most Ponzi Schemes, all it requires is a chain of investors with the old members paid hefty returns on their money from the deposits of the new members. The money investors may or may not understand how the scheme works, but quite often they don't care as long as they are getting big profits on their invested money. Everybody wakes up to the facts of the scheme, when the chain is broken by the force of law or due to some other reason. Then the investors, awaiting the big profits, have to pay a big price not only in money but also emotionally.

Double Shah's Ponzi Scheme was at its peak when it was exposed by The Nation (Pakistan), a Lahore daily newspaper in an investigative piece published on the front page on April 6, 2007. Double Shah was arrested by the Gakkhar town police on 13 April 2007 from his Nizamabad house on charges of Rs. 30,000 robbery. He was then put in the custody of the National Accountability Bureau in Pakistan. The first case was lodged against him with other 18 persons by the local police under the Anti-Terrorist act, and only one person was released on bail by the judge of the Anti-Terrorist court, in Gujranwala, Pakistan. His co-accused, Ijaz Cheema, was released on bail. The amount of money that he stole during his 18 months of activities was over Pakistani Rupees 110 million (over US$1 million).

In 2010, there were newspaper reports that the Accountability Court and National Accountability Bureau of Pakistan were able to return some of the fraudulent money to Double Shah's victims. In 2018, it was reported that National Accountability Bureau distributed Rupees 1.2 billion among 6490 victims of Double Shah scam so far over the years since the scam was discovered.

'Double Shah' was convicted by Judge Mian Murid Hussain in Accountability Court of Lahore on July 1, 2012. He was sentenced to 14 years Rigorous Imprisonment and fine equivalent to total liability against him (Pakistani Rupees 5.4 billion) less the amount recovered or being recovered in this case. All of his moveable and immovable assets were also confiscated.

== Death ==
'Double Shah' died in Pakistan on 30 October 2015.
