= Christos Papageorgiou =

Christos Papageorgiou (Greek: Χρήστος Παπαγεωργίου) can refer to:

- Christos Papageorgiou (skier) (1926-1997)
- Christos Papageorgiou (Scouting) (born 1944)
