= Homer I. Lewis =

United States Air Force general

Homer Irvin Lewis
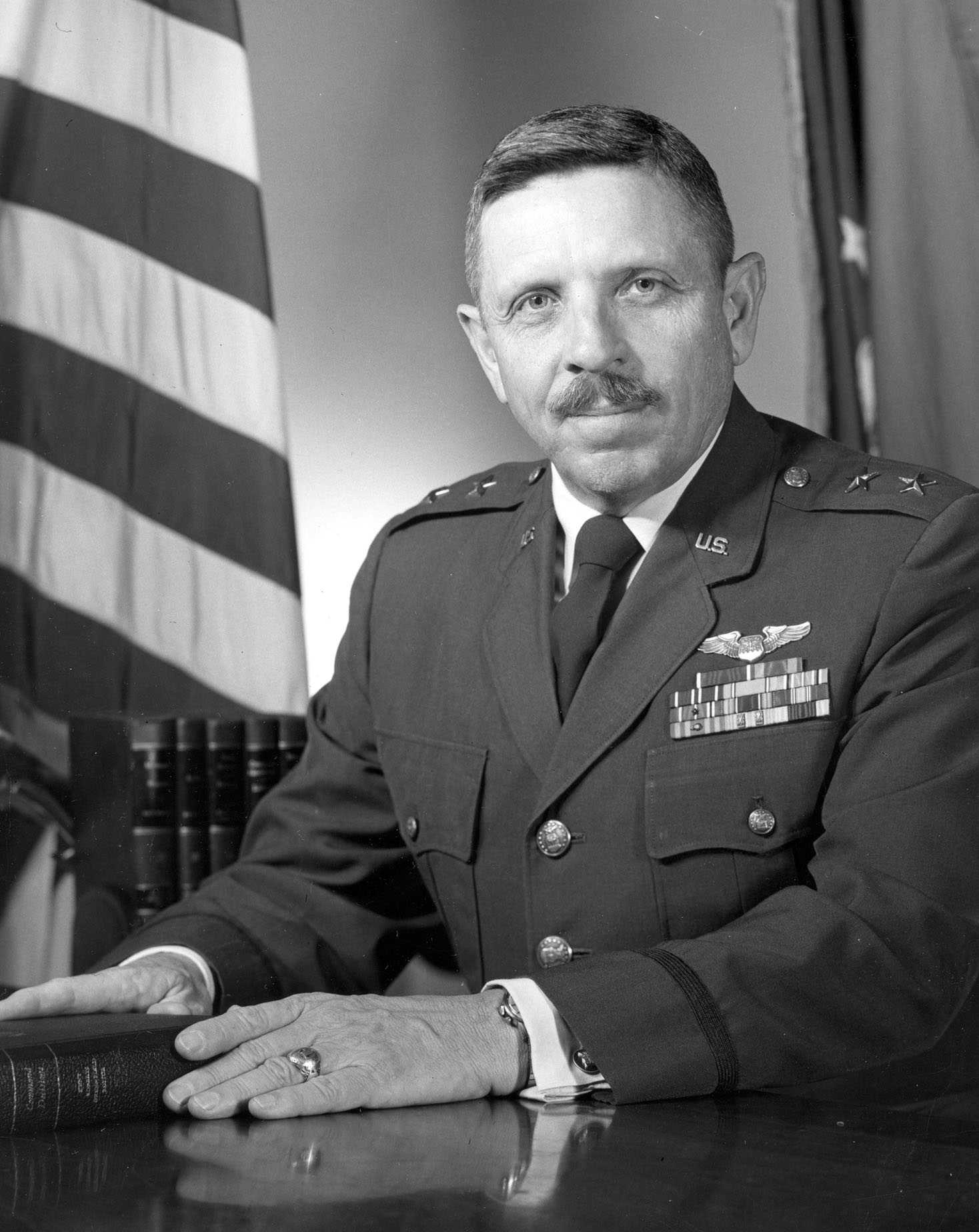
- Born: February 1, 1919; Asheville, North Carolina, United States
- Died: October 20, 2015 (aged 96); Eagle Pass, Texas, United States
- Burial place: Maverick County Cemetery in Eagle Pass, Texas
- Military career
- Allegiance: United States of America
- Branch: United States Army Air Forces United States Air Force Air Force Reserve
- Service years: 1940–1975
- Rank: major general
- Awards: Legion of Merit, Air Medal, Air Force Outstanding Unit Award Ribbon

Homer Irvin Lewis (February 1, 1919 – October 21, 2015) was a major general in the United States Air Force who served as Commander of the United States Air Force Reserve Command, Headquarters U.S. Air Force, Washington D.C., and commander, Headquarters Air Force Reserve, a separate operating agency located at Robins Air Force Base, Georgia. As chief of Air Force Reserve, he served as the principal adviser on Reserve matters to the Air Force Chief of Staff. As commander of AFRES, he had full responsibility for the supervision of U.S. Air Force Reserve units around the world.

== Biography ==
Lewis was born in Asheville, North Carolina in 1919. After living in the New York City area and attending school there, he moved with his family to Texas in 1932. He attended Culver Military Academy, Culver, Indiana, and graduated in 1938 as Class President and Regimental Commander. He won a competitive appointment to the U.S. Naval Academy in Annapolis, Maryland and entered in July 1938. After a year at Annapolis, Lewis resigned and entered the University of Texas. In December 1940 he was commissioned a second lieutenant, Reserve Infantry.

In July 1941 he was called to active military duty with Headquarters Gulf Coast Flying Training Command of the United States Army Air Forces at Randolph Field, Texas. In September 1941 he was assigned to the 81st Materiel Squadron, 75th Air Base Group, Foster Field, Texas. Lewis was selected for the glider training program at its inception in June 1942 and was assigned as commandant of students, 23d Army Air Forces Glider Training Detachment, Spencer, Iowa. The detachment was transferred to Hamilton, Texas, in September 1942. He was selected for the college training program in February 1943 and was assigned as commander, 93d Army Air Forces College Training Detachment at Spearfish, South Dakota. In March 1944 he was transferred to Douglas Army Airfield in Arizona, as commandant of cadets for the twin-engine advanced flying school with both Chinese and American officers and aviation cadets, the largest of its kind in the Army Air Corps.

In September 1944 Lewis volunteered for aerial gunnery training. He completed basic gunnery school at Kingman, Arizona, and completed the officer combat gunnery school at Laredo, Texas, in December 1944, with a rating of aerial observer. After three months as an aerial gunnery instructor at Harlingen Army Airfield, Texas, in February 1945 he went overseas and joined the 3d Air Division at Thetford, England and later was assigned to the 486th Bombardment Group, Eighth Air Force, as group gunnery officer. In this assignment, he flew combat missions over Central Europe in B-17 aircraft.

He returned to the United States in July 1945 and went to Drew Field, Florida, as gunnery officer for the 834th Bombardment Squadron. He was later transferred to Fort Sam Houston, Texas, where he was relieved from active duty in January 1946. From January 1946 to October 1951, he held various personnel positions in Reserve programs at Eagle Pass and Brooks Air Force Base, Texas. In October 1951 he joined a group of other officers in the formation of a Reserve wing at Brooks Air Force Base and later was assigned as adjutant of the 8707th Pilot Training Wing. When the wing was reorganized in April 1953 as the 433d Troop Carrier Wing (the Alamo Wing) he became director of personnel.

Lewis became commander of the 433d Air Base Group in April 1961, shortly after the 433d Wing moved to Kelly Air Force Bass, Texas. In January 1963 he was appointed director of materiel for the wing, after serving a short time as deputy commander. In March 1966 Lewis was appointed mobilization assistant to the commander, San Antonio Air Materiel Area, at Kelly Air Force Base, Texas. In April 1968 he became Reserve deputy to the commander, Headquarters Command, U.S. Air Force, at Bolling Air Force Base, Washington, D.C.

On March 8, 1971, Lewis was nominated by the president of the United States to serve as chief of Air Force Reserve. The nomination was confirmed by the Senate on April 5, 1971, and he was ordered to extended active duty for four years. On March 16, 1972, Lewis assumed the additional duty as Air Force Reserve commander. His military decorations and awards include the Legion of Merit, Air Medal and the Air Force Outstanding Unit Award Ribbon. He has a private pilot license and has logged more than 5,000 flying hours. He was promoted to the permanent grade of major general effective May 12, 1970. He retired on April 7, 1975, and died on October 21, 2015, at his home in Eagle Pass.

== Awards and decorations ==
Observer Badge

Legion of Merit
Air Medal
Air Force Outstanding Unit Award
American Defense Service Medal
American Campaign Medal
European–African–Middle Eastern Campaign Medal with one service star
National Defense Service Medal
Armed Forces Reserve Medal with silver Hourglass device
Air Force Longevity Service Award with one silver oak leaf cluster
Small Arms Expert Marksmanship Medal
