= Attila Kálmán =

Hungarian educator and politician

Member of the National Assembly
- In office 2 May 1990 – 27 June 1994

Personal details
- Born: 22 October 1938 Budapest, Hungary
- Died: 28 October 2015 (aged 77)
- Party: MDF (1987–1994)
- Profession: educator, politician

Attila Kálmán (22 October 1938 – 28 October 2015) was a Hungarian educator and politician, who served as Political Secretary of State for Education between 1991 and 1994. He was also a Member of Parliament (MP) for Tata (Komárom-Esztergom County Constituency II) from 1990 to 1994.

He was a founding member of the Hungarian Democratic Forum (MDF). After the 1990 parliamentary election, he worked in the Committee on Human Rights, Minorities and Religious Affairs from 1990 until 1991, when he was appointed Secretary of State under Minister of Education Bertalan Andrásfalvy then Ferenc Mádl. He had an important role in the restitution of the formerly nationalized educational institutions by the Communist regime to the Christian and other churches. Following the failure 1994 parliamentary election, Kálmán left MDF in that year.

He served as General Superintendent of the Transdanubian Reformed Church District between 1990 and 2002. He was also Secular Chairman of the General Synod of the Reformed Church in Hungary from 1997 to 2003.

Kálmán died on 28 October 2015, aged 77.
