= Paul R. Norby =

Former rear admiral of the United States Naval Reserve

- Born: May 16, 1913; Madison, Minnesota, U.S.
- Died: October 3, 2015 (aged 102); Wayzata, Minnesota, U.S.
- Military career
- Allegiance: United States
- Branch: United States Navy
- Rank: Rear admiral
- Conflicts: World War II

Paul R. Norby (May 16, 1913 – October 3, 2015) was a rear admiral in the United States Naval Reserve. He entered service in 1939 and retired in 1973. He later served as a postmaster of Mabel, Minnesota.
