= Robert Light =

American politician

Robert S. Light

Member of the New Mexico House of Representatives for the 55th district
- In office 1985–1996

Personal details
- Born: March 4, 1927 United States
- Died: October 26, 2015 (aged 88) Carlsbad, New Mexico
- Party: Democratic
- Spouse: Joanna Wills Light

Robert S. "Bob" Light (March 4, 1927 – October 26, 2015) was an American politician who was a Democratic member of the New Mexico House of Representatives from 1985 to 1996. Prior to his House term, he was also commissioner of Eddy County, New Mexico from 1979 to 1982. Light also sat on the boards of Carlsbad National Bank and Carlsbad Bancorporation, Inc.
