= Ryszard Wcisło =

Ryszard Wcisło "Chytry Jastrząb" ("Sly Hawk") (8 April 1933 – 24 October 2015) was a Polish scout leader who worked in the Kraków branch of Polish Scouting and Guiding Association, KIHAM (pl:Krąg Instruktorów Harcerskich im. Andrzeja Małkowskiego), ZHP-1918 (pl:Związek Harcerstwa Polskiego rok założenia 1918), and lately in Scouting Association of the Republic.

== Awards ==
- 2015: Commander's Cross of the Order of Polonia Restituta (posthumously)
- 2008: Officer's Cross of the Order of Polonia Restituta
