= Stanley Philips =

English cricketer

Personal information
- Full name: Stanley Ian Philips
- Born: 4 February 1920; Tunbridge Wells, Kent
- Died: 27 October 2015 (aged 95); Northampton, Northamptonshire
- Batting: Right-handed
- Bowling: Right-arm medium
- Role: Batsman

Domestic team information
- Years: Team
- 1938–1939: Northamptonshire
- 1941/2: Europeans

Career statistics
Competition	First-class
Matches	7
Runs scored	156
Batting average	14.18
100s/50s	0
Top score	42
Balls bowled	14
Wickets	0
Bowling average	–
5 wickets in innings	–
10 wickets in match	–
Best bowling	–
Catches/stumpings	14/–
- Source: CricketArchive, 21 January 2016

Stanley Ian Philips (4 February 1920 – 27 October 2015) was an English cricketer who played for Northamptonshire in the 1938 and 1939 seasons, including the club's last match before the outbreak of the Second World War. During the war he was stationed in India where he played for the Europeans.

He was born in Tunbridge Wells on 4 February 1920 and educated at Brighton College and Oxford University. In later life he was headmaster of Eaglehurst College in Northampton.

Philips appeared in seven first-class matches as a right-handed batsman. He scored 156 runs with a highest score of 42.
