= Erma Johnson Hadley =

African American educator (1942–2015)

Erma Johnson Hadley (June 6, 1942 – October 1, 2015) was an American educator, the first woman and first African American to serve as chancellor of Tarrant County College. She was named to the Texas Women's Hall of Fame in 2010.

== Early life and education ==
She grew up in Leggett, Texas, and was the first black student there to graduate from college. She received a bachelor's degree from Prairie View A&M University and an MBA from Bowling Green State University.

== Career ==
Hadley began teaching at Turner High School in Panola County. In 1968, she became a founding member of the faculty of the Northeast Campus of Tarrant County Junior College, later Tarrant County College (TCC). She was named interim chancellor of TCC in 2009 and became chancellor the following year.

Hadley served on the Trinity River Authority of Texas and the Texas Governor’s Committee on Volunteerism. She was the first woman named to the Dallas/Fort Worth International Airport Board and the first African American to serve as the board's chair.

== Personal life ==
She married Lawrence Johnson, and later married Bill Hadley after Johnson's death. She had one daughter, Ardenia Johnson Gould.

== Death ==
Hadley died at the age of 73 after suffering from pancreatic cancer.
