= Dölf Mettler =

Swiss artist (1934–2015)

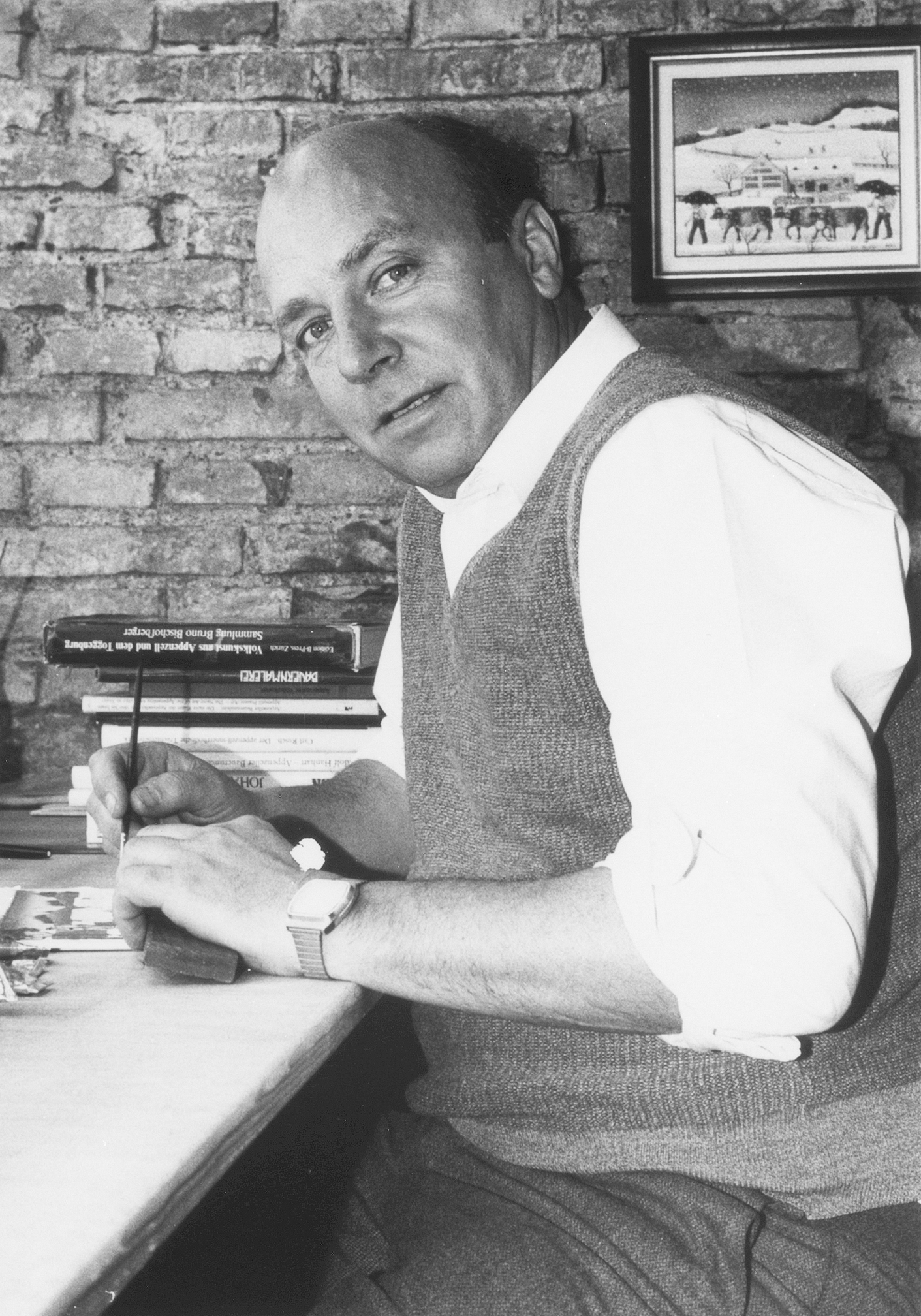

Dölf Mettler (22 May 1934 – 15 October 2015) was a Swiss yodeler, composer and painter.
