= Col Westaway =

Australian cricketer (1936–2015)

Personal information
- Full name: Colin Edward Westaway
- Born: 27 August 1936; Brisbane, Queensland, Australia
- Died: 15 October 2015 (aged 79); Moggill, Queensland, Australia
- Batting: Right-handed
- Bowling: Right-arm leg-spin

Domestic team information
- Years: Team
- 1957/58–1963/64: Queensland

Career statistics
Competition	First-class
Matches	19
Runs scored	207
Batting average	13.80
100s/50s	0/0
Top score	33
Balls bowled	2,949
Wickets	52
Bowling average	32.75
5 wickets in innings	2
10 wickets in match	0
Best bowling	6/88
Catches/stumpings	20/–
- Source: Cricinfo, 30 June 2024

Colin Edward Westaway (27 August 1936 – 15 October 2015) was an Australian cricketer. He played 19 first-class matches for Queensland between the 1957–58 and 1963–64 seasons.

Born at Brisbane, Westaway was a leg-spin bowler and tail-end batsman who played for Western Suburbs Cricket Club in the city. He achieved his best bowling figures of 6 for 88 and his highest score of 33 in the same match, the opening match of the 1960–61 Sheffield Shield, against New South Wales in Brisbane. Illness ended his first-class career after the 1963–64 season, although in his Wisden obituary the almanack considered that he had been "poorly treated by Queensland's selectors" when he was not selected after the 1963–64 season.

Westaway died at the Wesley Hospital at Auchenflower in Brisbane in 2015. He was aged 79. A cricket ground in the Brisbane suburb of Moggill is named the Col Westaway Oval in his honour. His family had owned a pineapple farm at Moggill.
