= Michel Couriard =

Jersey vingtenier and civil servant

Michel "Mitch" Couriard MBE (20 December 1953 – 23 October 2015) was a Jersey vingtenier and civil servant.

== Biography ==
He trained and initially worked as an electrician. After several years of voluntary service with the Jersey Youth Service, he later took up a post with the Department of Education.

He was one of Jersey's torchbearers in the 2012 Summer Olympics torch relay.

In 2013, he sat for the People's Choice portrait by royal portrait painter Christian Furr. The portrait is displayed at the Jersey Heritage Jersey Museum and Art Gallery.

On 18 August 2015, Couriard married his second wife, Kaye Temple, at Southampton Hospital. He died of cancer at the Jersey Hospice on 23 October 2015, aged 61. His funeral was held on 8 November 2015 at the Parish Church of St Helier, and was attended by hundreds of people.

== Parish Municipality ==
Couriard was a member of the Honorary Police having been elected to serve as a vingtenier for the Vingtaine du Mont à l'Abbé in Saint Helier, Jersey. He was also president of the Honorary Police Association.

Couriard's "beat" includes Victoria Avenue, meaning that he is delegated to manage policing for the annual Battle of Flowers held in August - an event that continues to attract crowds of 10,000 or more. As such he was one of the most visible members of the island's Honorary Police.

== Member of the Order of the British Empire ==
He was awarded membership of the Order of the British Empire in the Queen's birthday honours list of June 2002 jointly for his services as a civil servant and his honorary work.
