= Barbara Orzechowska-Ryszel =

Polish fencer

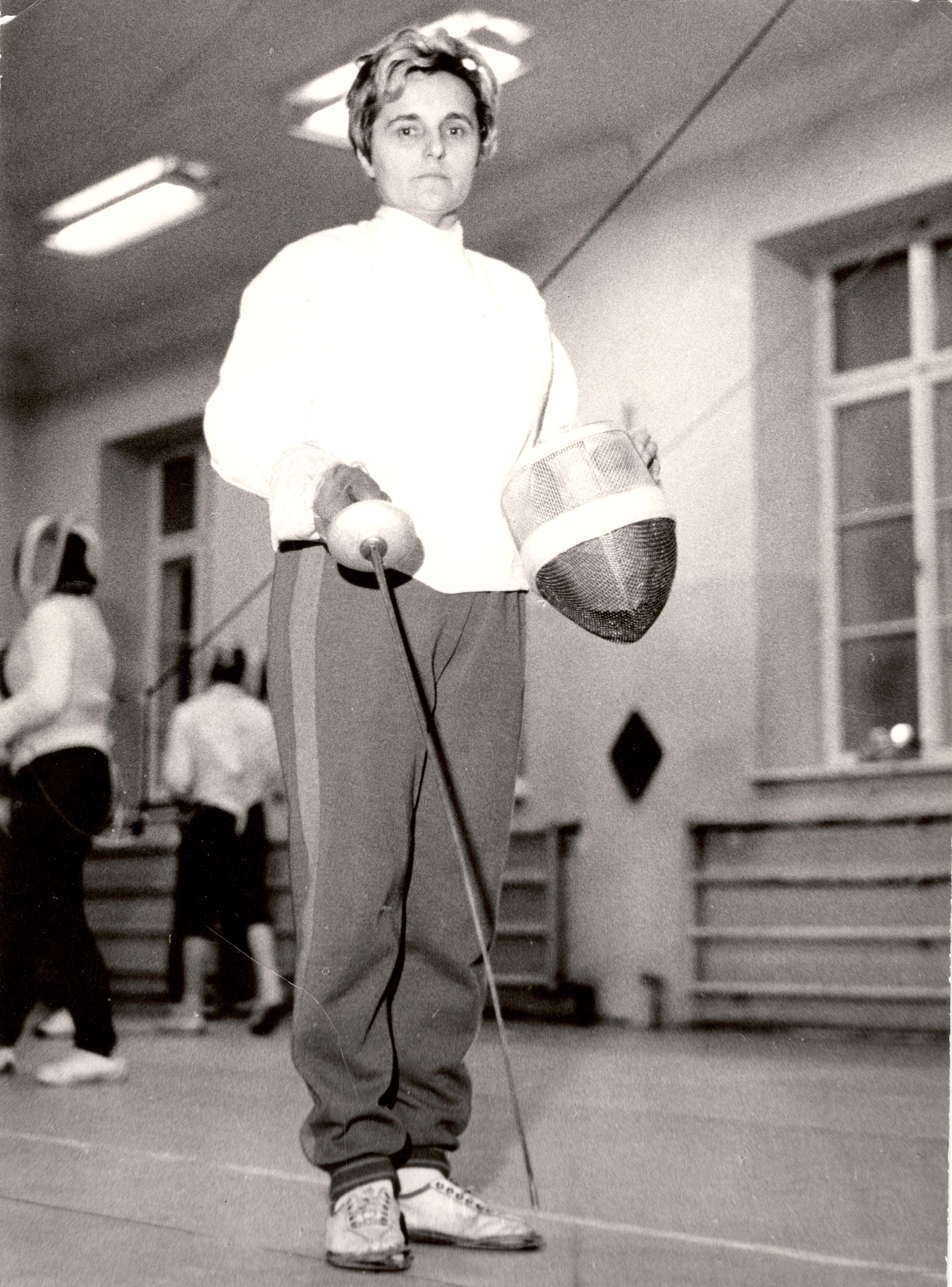

Personal information
- Born: 29 August 1931 Warsaw, Poland
- Died: 16 October 2015 (aged 84) Warsaw, Poland

Sport
- Sport: Fencing

Barbara Orzechowska-Ryszel (29 August 1931 – 16 October 2015) was a Polish fencer. She competed in the women's team foil event at the 1960 Summer Olympics. In 1956 and 1960 she was the Polish women's individual champion.
