= Oddvar Kruge =

Norwegian footballer (1926-2015)

Personal information
- Date of birth: 17 April 1926
- Place of birth: Larvik, Norway
- Date of death: 29 October 2015 (aged 89)

International career
Years	Team	Apps	(Gls)
1951	Norway	1	(0)

Oddvar Kruge (17 April 1926 – 29 October 2015) was a Norwegian footballer. He played in one match for the Norway national football team in 1951.
