= Eteiwi Majali =

Jordanian politician (1950–2015)

Eteiwi Majali (1950 – 24 October 2015) was a Jordanian politician. Majali was elected to the House of Representatives in the 2013 general election. He was a representative for the Second District of Karak Governorate.

Majali was born in Al Karak. He was buried in his hometown of Rabbah, Karak Governorate.

On 19 December 2015 Eteiwi's younger brother Sameh won the by-election which was held to fill his seat.
