= Isao Hosoe =

Japanese engineer and designer

Isao Hosoe (8 March 1942 – 3 October 2015) was a Japanese engineer and designer.

== Biography ==
Born in Tokyo, Hosoe studied there at Nihon University where he graduated in 1965 with a major in aerospace engineering with a thesis on a human-powered aircraft, followed by a Master in Sciences in 1967. From the same year he moved to Milan where he still lived until his death, mainly collaborating with Alberto Rosselli and Gio Ponti of the Studio Ponti-Fornaroli-Rosselli from 1967 to 1974. In 1985 he founded his own studio Isao Hosoe Design.

Hosoe was a member of the ADI, the SIE (Italian Society of Ergonomics), the Japan Design Committee and the Japan Inter-Design Forum. He was Professor of Industrial Design at the Polytechnic University of Milan and at the Sapienza University of Rome. He has taught in several institutions: the Faculty of Architecture in Alghero, Domus Academy, the University of Siena, ISIA of Florence, Institute of Design in Cagliari, Les Ateliers in Paris, Elisava of Barcelona, RISD in Providence, and the University of Lisbon.

Several projects of Hosoes' are on permanent display at the Centre Georges Pompidou in Paris, the Victoria and Albert Museum of London, and also in Milan and Chicago. He has received numerous awards, regionally and internationally, for projects in the field product design and interior design, transportation, telecommunications and electronics: these include the Compasso d'Oro by Iveco Space for Carrozzeria Orlandi, the Good Design Award of Japan and Chicago and the Gold Medal at the Triennale.

He died on October 3, 2015, in Milan.
