= Bryan Lowe =

English cricketer

Bryan Lowe (5 November 1925 – 15 October 2015) was an English cricketer. He was a right-handed batsman who played for Cheshire. He was born in Worsley, Salford, Lancashire.

Lowe, who had played with the team in the Minor Counties Championship since 1948, made a single List A appearance for the team, in the 1964 Gillette Cup, against Surrey. From the upper-middle order, he scored a duck.
