= Lyudmila Kedrina =

Russian alpine skier (1961–2015)

Lyudmila Kedrina (née Reus; 27 January 1961 – 10 October 2015) was a Russian skier and international alpine skiing champion. She represented the USSR in the World Championships and was the winner of the European Championship. From 2009, she was the head coach of the Federation of skiing and snowboarding in Saint Petersburg.

== Biography ==
Kedrina was born in Beloretsk in Bashkortostan. She headed the children's ski school sports complex Ohta-Park. She taught for three years between 1999 and 2001, and was the Russian champion. Her son Maksim Kedrin participated in the 2002 Olympics, and her daughter Anastasia Kedrina is the double champion of Russia (2009, Tashtagol, Super G, Super Combined), and participant of the World Skiing Championships in 2009 in Germany.

Kedrina died in October 2015 in Saint Petersburg.
