= Peter Tillers =

Peter Tillers, American scholar of the law of evidence, was born in Riga, Latvia, in 1943 and arrived in the United States in 1950. He was educated at Yale University (A.B., 1966) and Harvard Law School (J.D., 1969, LL.M., 1972). He was Professor of Law at Cardozo Law School, New York, from 1986. He died on October 3, 2015.

Tillers was a reviser of John Henry Wigmore's multi-volume treatise on the law of evidence and published a variety of articles on evidence, inference, and investigation.

He was an editor of the Oxford journal Law, Probability and Risk. Tillers was chairman and secretary of the Evidence Section of the Association of American Law Schools. He was a Fellow of Law & Humanities at Harvard University and a Senior Max Rheinstein Fellow at LMU Munich. He was a visiting professor at Harvard Law School in the spring semester of 2002. Professor Tillers was legal adviser for the Latvian mission to the United Nations during the 48th Session of the General Assembly. He maintains a website with discussion of a wide range of general issues of evidence.

Tillers' scholarship focused on evidential inference and fact investigation in legal settings. He maintained that multiple methods of marshaling and analyzing evidence are important in trials and in pretrial investigation and informal fact discovery (and in many other human domains). He maintained that inference networks offer a useful window into investigative discovery and proof at trial. But he believed that subjective, synthetic, and gestalt-like perspectives on evidence, inference, and proof are also essential. (This aspect of his thinking about evidential inference is almost undoubtedly attributable to his early interest in Immanuel Kant, G.W.F. Hegel, and, in general, German Idealism.)

Tillers came to the conclusion that real headway in the study of human inference (and of much else) can be made if and only if it is understood that the human animal is an intelligent organism that "thinks" both at a conscious and subconscious level; he believed that Aristotle was fundamentally right in the way he, Aristotle, viewed (wo)man and his (her) place in the cosmos.

== Publications ==
- Editor, Evidence Module of Spindle Law (draft released, Nov. 16, 2009)
- Crime, Procedure, and Evidence in a Comparative and International Context (2008) (co-edited with John Jackson & Maximo Langer)
- The Dynamics of Judicial Proof: Computation, Logic, and Common Sense (2002) (co-edited with Marilyn MacCrimmon)
- Probability and Inference in the Law of Evidence: The Uses and Limits of Bayesianism (1988) (co-edited with Eric Green), republished as L'Inferenza nel diritto probabilistica nel diritto delle prove: Usi e limiti del bayesianesimo (A. Mura trans., Giuffre editore, 2003)
- Vols. I & IA Wigmore on Evidence (P. Tillers rev. 1983)
