= Stephen Mosher (photographer) =

American photographer and activist (born 1964)

- Born: July 8, 1964 (age 62); Dallas, Texas, United States
- Education: University of North Texas
- Occupations: Photographer, writer
- Years active: 1987–present
- Notable work: The Sweater Book
- Spouse: Pat Dwyer (1986–present)

Stephen Mosher (born July 8, 1964) is an American photographer, writer, and activist. He is known for his portraits published in Playbill Magazine and for his 2003 portrait series The Sweater Book.

== Personal life ==
Mosher was born in Dallas, Texas, to a businessman and an artist. He is the second of four children. He was educated in Europe: first, at St. Dominic's and Carlucci American International School of Lisbon (previously St. Columban's) in Portugal, and then at the Zurich International School and The International School of Berne in Switzerland. Mosher returned to America in 1982, where he attended Tarrant County Junior College and North Texas State University. In 1985, while attending university, he met Pat Dwyer, who would become his future husband. In 1993, the couple relocated from Texas to New York City.

== Career ==
=== Photography ===
While living in Dallas, Mosher worked as a photographer and occasional actor in the local theater scene, taking headshots, publicity stills, and performance photos at theaters like the Dallas Children's Theater, the Dallas Alliance Theater, the Richardson Theater Center, and the Gryphon Players. In 1993, he and Dwyer moved to New York, so that he could focus on his project The Sweater Book, a photo collection of people wearing the same cardigan sweater. Mosher's goal was to publish the collection in book form and donate the proceeds to HIV/AIDS charities. The Sweater Book was published in 2003 by Thomas Dunne Books, and it featured hundreds of people, including Whoopi Goldberg, Bryan Cranston, Tim Allen, and Sarah Jessica Parker. While working on The Sweater Book, Mosher had a bicoastal lifestyle, working in both New York and Hollywood, where he became the staff photographer for Noah Wyle's Blank Theatre Company.

During the 1990s, Mosher photographed performers such as Jennifer Lopez, Matthew Morrison, Alan Cumming, and Donna Murphy.

After the publication of The Sweater Book, Mosher took time off from photography to focus on his interests in health, fitness, and blogging. He returned to photography part-time in 2010.

=== Other ===
From 2013 to 2017, Mosher was a contributing columnist for the internet magazine EDGE, as well as providing content for the EDGEONTHENET website, on the subject of health and fitness.

In 2014, Mosher completed his course of study and became an ACE certified personal trainer and an American Red Cross certified lifeguard.

In 2016, Stephen Mosher published his memoir, Lived in Crazy, which focuses on his life, family, and the creation of The Sweater Book.

In 2017, Mosher made his New York City nightclub debut at the Don't Tell Mama club and restaurant. In the 80-minute show titled The Story Teller, he recounted his life in songs and stories. Journalist Bart Greenberg of Cabaret Scenes Magazine called the show a "surprising cabaret debut" and praised Mosher's "pleasant voice that flowed between a whiskey tenor and a Bea Arthur baritone".

From August 2019 until the end of 2023, Mosher was the editor and head writer for BroadwayWorld Cabaret. In this position, he wrote reviews, conducted interviews, and oversaw the team of correspondents covering live entertainment in New York City. For the year that the nightclubs of Manhattan were closed due to the pandemic, Mosher created content every day with reviews of online entertainment and CDs, interviews, playlists, and feature articles. During his tenure at BroadwayWorld, Stephen photographed the likes of Chita Rivera and Vanessa Williams.

Stephen Mosher returned to acting for the 2023 feature film Evil Sublet, written and directed by Allan Piper and starring Jennifer Leigh Houston and Sally Struthers. In the film, Mosher played opposite his husband Pat Dwyer.

In addition, Mosher had a career in event coordination for six years, handling both private and corporate parties, in addition to weddings.

== Activism ==
In 2011, Mosher and his husband, Pat Dwyer, celebrated 25 years of partnership by getting married in every American jurisdiction where same-sex marriage was legal at the time. This journey was documented in the film Married and Counting (2013), directed by Allan Piper and narrated by George Takei, featuring original music by Jennifer Houston. Mosher and Dwyer hoped that the film, as well as their YouTube channel, would help promote gay rights and marriage equality.
