= Laurence Smart =

Australian cricketer

Personal information
- Full name: Laurence Maxwell Smart
- Born: 16 February 1928; Crystal Brook, South Australia, Australia
- Died: 12 October 2015 (aged 87)
- Source: ESPNcricinfo, 29 June 2016

Laurence Smart (16 February 1928 – 12 October 2015) was an Australian cricketer. He played five first-class matches for South Australia between 1950 and 1958.
