= Monte B. Miller =

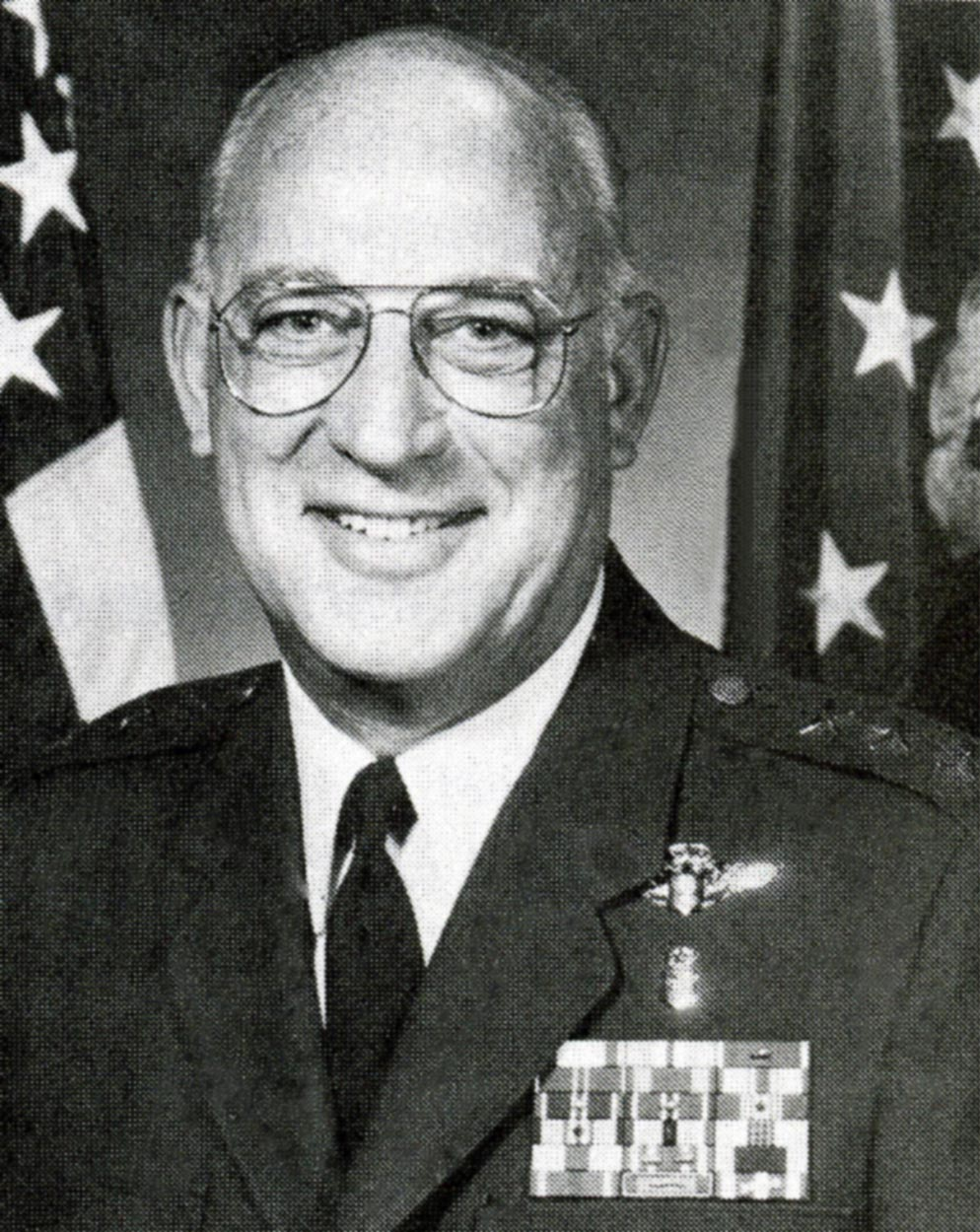
- Born: September 4, 1930; Independence, Missouri, U.S.
- Died: October 28, 2015 (aged 85)
- Military career
- Allegiance: United States of America
- Branch: United States Air Force
- Service years: 1956–1991
- Rank: Lieutenant General
- Awards: Distinguished Service Medal, Defense Superior Service Medal, Legion of Merit with oak leaf cluster, Bronze Star Medal, Air Medal, Air Force Commendation Medal

Monte Baldwin Miller (September 4, 1930 – October 28, 2015) was a lieutenant general in the United States Air Force who served as surgeon general of the United States Air Force from 1988 to 1991.

General Miller was born in 1930, in Independence, Missouri, where he graduated from William Chrisman High School in 1948. He received a bachelor of arts degree with a major in chemistry from the University of Kansas in 1951 and was selected to the Phi Beta Kappa honorary scholastic fraternity. He continued his education at the University of Kansas School of Medicine and received his doctor of medicine degree in 1955. Miller completed his medical internship at Tacoma General Hospital (Washington_ in 1956. He completed his residency training in internal medicine at Wilford Hall USAF Medical Center, Lackland Air Force Base, Texas, in 1965. He was specialty board-certified in 1967 and recertified in 1977 by the American Board of Internal Medicine. Miller was appointed assistant clinical professor at the University of California School of Medicine in 1968 and was elected to a fellowship in the American College of Physicians in 1972.

After receiving his commission as a first lieutenant in October 1956, he was assigned to the USAF Hospital, Williams Air Force Base, Arizona. He completed the Aerospace Medicine Primary Course at the School of Aerospace Medicine, Randolph Air Force Base, Texas, and received an aeronautical rating of flight surgeon in 1957. From October 1958 to July 1962 Miller was engaged in private medical practice in Garnett, Kan. He re-entered the Air Force with an assignment at Wilford Hall for specialty training in internal medicine. In July 1965 he was appointed assistant for medical training at David Grant USAF Medical Center, Travis Air Force Base, Calif. From July 1967 to July 1968 he was assigned to the 12th U.S. Air Force Hospital, Cam Ranh Bay Air Base, Republic of Vietnam, as chief of medicine.

Miller returned to David Grant USAF Medical Center as chairman of the Department of Medicine. He became deputy commander and director of hospital services in July 1973, and commander in May 1975. He was a key participant in the prisoners of war homecoming from North Vietnam, and Operation Babylift.

Miller transferred to the Medical Directorate, Air Force Inspection and Safety Center, Norton Air Force Base, Calif., as an inspection team chief in July 1978. He then served as chief of the Medical Inspection Division from March 1979 to February 1980. In March 1980 he assumed command of Malcolm Grow USAF Medical Center, Andrews Air Force Base, Maryland. In November 1981 Miller became command surgeon, Military Airlift Command at Scott Air Force Base, Illinois. In this capacity he served as the medical adviser to the commander in chief, Military Airlift Command, on the physical well-being of command personnel, and was responsible for the command's worldwide aeromedical evacuation mission, its medical centers, and hospitals and clinics.

In April 1985 Miller became commander of Wilford Hall USAF Medical Center and was responsible for its quadrilateral mission of health care, medical education, readiness and research. He became command surgeon, U.S. European Command, Stuttgart-Vaihingen, West Germany, in May 1986.

He is a chief flight surgeon. His military decorations and awards include the Distinguished Service Medal, Defense Superior Service Medal, Legion of Merit with oak leaf cluster, Bronze Star Medal, Air Medal and Air Force Commendation Medal. He was appointed as an internal medicine consultant to the surgeon general in 1970. He is a senior member and past president of the Society of Air Force Physicians, a member of the Kansas Medical Society and a fellow of the American College of Physicians. He is also a member of the Society of Medical Consultants to the Armed Forces, American Medical Association, Aerospace Medical Association and Association of Military Surgeons of the United States. He received a Meritorious Service Award from the Uniformed Services University of the Health Sciences for his contributions as an adviser to the board of regents and was the Air Force Medical Service representative to the executive board of the National Library of Medicine and to the Armed Forces Epidemiology Board.

He was promoted to lieutenant general August 1, 1988, with same date of rank and retired on August 1, 1991. Miller died on October 28, 2015.
