= Takis Papageorgopoulos =

Greek Army general and politician

Panagiotis "Takis" Papageorgopoulos (Greek: Τάκης Παπαγεωργόπουλος; 1934 – 23 October 2015) was a Greek Army general who was a central figure in the so-called ASPIDA affair.

Following the restoration of democracy in Greece, he served as Member of Parliament for PASOK from 1977 until 1985 and from 1986 until 1989.
