= Pazuzu Algarad =

American murderer

- Born: John Alexander Lawson; San Francisco, California, U.S.
- Died: October 28, 2015; Central Prison, Raleigh, North Carolina, U.S.
- Other names: John Alexander Lawson; Pazuzu Ilah Algarad
- Television: The Devil You Know
- Status: Deceased
- Criminal charge: Murder

Pazuzu Ilah Algarad (born John Alexander Lawson, died October 28, 2015) was an American suspected murderer who was accused of killing one man and helping conceal the death of another. Algarad killed himself in jail, and was never legally tried or found guilty, but his girlfriend pled guilty on associated charges.

== Biography ==
Born as John Alexander Lawson, Algarad legally changed his name in 2002 to conform with his self-developed belief system fusing satanism and Islam. He borrowed the name Pazuzu from an ancient supernatural entity in Mesopotamian lore, and his surname "Ilah Algarad" means "the lord of the locusts" in Arabic. Algarad lived in Clemmons, North Carolina. Police stated he had performed animal sacrifices and other ceremonies along with a group of associates. Algarad was described as a "local boogeyman" figure in his community, known for peculiar behavior and a house with unusual decor reflecting his belief system. A local journalist said Algarad was "trying to freak people out" with his strange appearance and behavior.

Algarad was accused of attacking his mother in 2010, but she declined to cooperate with investigators citing fear of her son. She moved out of the house, which became "a hangout for local goth and Satanist subculture" and neighbors made many complaints with police about parties and drug use at the house.

In 2012, Algarad was convicted as an accessory after the fact for the 2010 shooting death of Joseph Emmrick Chandler, in a municipal park near the Yadkin River in 2010. He was sentenced to 10 to 12 months, while the actual shooter Nicholas Rizzi was sentenced to over 12 months on involuntary manslaughter charges.

In 2014, Algarad, his girlfriend and an associate were arrested after police discovered skeletal remains in shallow graves in his backyard. These remains were later confirmed as those of two men reported missing in 2009: Joshua Wetzler, who Algarad was accused of killing in July 2009; and Tommy Welch, who Algarad's girlfriend Amber Burch was accused of killing in October 2009. Both Welch and Wetzler were acquainted with Algarad and moved in the same social circles. Krystal Matlock was also arrested, and charged as an accessory. Investigators said robbery was the main suspected motive for these deaths.

Burch was charged and later pleaded guilty to murder and being an accessory, and was sentenced to a minimum of 40 years in prison.

Algarad died of an apparent suicide in a North Carolina prison cell on October 28, 2015, shortly before he was scheduled to appear in court for hearings on his charges.

The house where Clemmons lived with his mother was demolished on April 24, 2015, after being declared unfit for human occupation.

Algarad was featured in the posthumous documentary The Devil You Know by Vice Media.
