= 2015 in Brazil =

Events in the year 2015 in Brazil:

== Incumbents ==
=== Federal government ===
- President: Dilma Rousseff
- Vice President: Michel Temer

=== Governors ===
- Acre: Tião Viana
- Alagoas:
  - Teotônio Vilela Filho (until 1 January)
  - Renan Filho (starting 1 January)
- Amapa:
  - Camilo Capiberibe (until 1 January)
  - Waldez Góes (starting 1 January)
- Amazonas: José Melo
- Bahia:
  - Jacques Wagner (until 1 January)
  - Rui Costa (starting 1 January)
- Ceará:
  - Cid Gomes (until 1 January)
  - Camilo Santana (starting 1 January)
- Espírito Santo:
  - Renato Casagrande (until 1 January)
  - Paulo Hartung (starting 1 January)
- Goiás: Marconi Perillo
- Maranhão:
  - Arnaldo Melo (until 1 January)
  - Flávio Dino (starting 1 January)
- Mato Grosso: Pedro Taques
- Mato Grosso do Sul:
  - André Puccinelli (until 1 January)
  - Reinaldo Azambuja (starting 1 January)
- Minas Gerais: Fernando Damata Pimentel (starting 1 January)
- Pará: Simão Jatene
- Paraíba: Ricardo Coutinho
- Paraná: Beto Richa
- Pernambuco:
  - João Lyra Neto (until 1 January)
  - Paulo Câmara (starting 1 January)
- Piauí:
  - Zé Filho (until 1 January)
  - Wellington Dias (starting 1 January)
- Rio de Janeiro: Luiz Fernando Pezão (starting 1 January)
- Rio Grande do Norte:
  - Rosalba Ciarlini Rosado (until 1 January)
  - Robinson Faria (starting 1 January)
- Rio Grande do Sul:
  - Tarso Genro (until 1 January)
  - José Ivo Sartori (starting 1 January)
- Rondônia: Confúcio Moura
- Roraima: Suely Campos
- Santa Catarina: Raimundo Colombo
- São Paulo: Geraldo Alckmin
- Sergipe: Jackson Barreto
- Tocantins:
  - Sandoval Cardoso (until 1 January)
  - Marcelo Miranda (starting 1 January)

=== Vice governors ===
- Acre:
  - Carlos César Correia de Messias (until 1 January)
  - Maria Nazareth Melo de Araújo Lambert (starting 1 January)
- Alagoas:
  - José Thomaz da Silva Nonô Neto (until 1 January)
  - José Luciano Barbosa da Silva (starting 1 January)
- Amapá:
  - Doralice Nascimento de Souza (until 1 January)
  - João Bosco Papaléo Paes (starting 1 January)
- Amazonas:
  - José Melo de Oliveira (until 1 January)
  - José Henrique Oliveira (starting 1 January)
- Bahia:
  - Otto Alencar (until 1 January)
  - João Leão (starting 1 January)
- Ceará:
  - Domingos Gomes de Aguiar Filho (until 1 January)
  - Maria Izolda Cela de Arruda Coelho (starting 1 January)
- Espírito Santo:
  - Givaldo Vieira da Silva (until 1 January)
  - César Roberto Colnago (starting 1 January)
- Goiás: José Eliton de Figueiredo Júnior
- Maranhão:
  - Joaquim Washington Luiz de Oliveira (until 1 January)
  - Carlos Orleans Brandão Júnior (starting 1 January)
- Mato Grosso:
  - Francisco Tarquínio Daltro (until 1 January)
  - Carlos Henrique Baqueta Fávaro (starting 1 January)
- Mato Grosso do Sul:
  - Simone Tebet (until 1 January)
  - Rose Modesto (starting 1 January)
- Minas Gerais:
  - Alberto Pinto Coelho Júnior (until 1 January)
  - Antônio Eustáquio Andrade Ferreira (starting 1 January)
- Pará:
  - Helenilson Cunha Pontes (until 1 January)
  - José da Cruz Marinho (starting 1 January)
- Paraíba:
  - Rômulo José de Gouveia (until 1 January)
  - Lígia Feliciano (starting 1 January)
- Paraná:
  - Flávio José Arns (until 1 January)
  - Maria Aparecida Borghetti (starting 1 January)
- Pernambuco:
  - João Soares Lyra Neto (until 1 January)
  - Raul Jean Louis Henry Júnior (starting 1 January)
- Piaui:
  - Antônio José de Moraes Souza Filho (until 1 January)
  - Margarete de Castro Coelho (starting 1 January)
- Rio de Janeiro: Francisco Dornelles (starting January 1)
- Rio Grande do Norte:
  - Robinson Faria (until 1 January)
  - Fábio Dantas (starting 1 January)
- Rio Grande do Sul:
  - Jorge Alberto Duarte Grill (until 1 January)
  - José Paulo Dornelles Cairoli (starting 1 January)
- Rondônia:
  - Airton Pedro Gurgacz (until 1 January)
  - Daniel Pereira (starting 1 January)
- Roraima:
  - Francisco de Assis Rodrigues (until 1 January)
  - Paulo César Justo Quartiero (starting 1 January)
- Santa Catarina: Eduardo Pinho Moreira
- São Paulo:
  - Guilherme Afif Domingos (until 1 January)
  - Márcio França (starting 1 January)
- Sergipe:
  - Jackson Barreto de Lima (until 1 January)
  - Belivaldo Chagas Silva (starting 1 January)
- Tocantins: Cláudia Telles de Menezes Pires Martins Lelis (starting 1 January)

== Events ==
=== January ===
- January 1: Dilma Rousseff is inaugurated for a second term as Brazilian President.
- January 6: Two commuter trains collide at Mesquita, Rio de Janeiro, injuring 158 people.

=== February ===
- February 4: The president of Petrobras, Maria das Graças Foster, as well as five other directors of the oil company resign; amidst allegations of corruption.
- February 21: Six months since the beginning of Operation Castanheira, Ezequiel Antônio Castanha, who is considered to be the biggest Amazon deforester of all time, is arrested. This was a joint operation by the Federal Police, the Brazilian Institute of the Environment, the Federal Public Ministry, the Federal Revenue Service, and the National Public Security Force.
- February 24: The judge in the insider trading trial of Eike Batista is videotaped driving one of his seized vehicles.

=== March ===
- March 4: The Supreme Federal Court extinguishes the sentence of former Workers' Party president José Genoino, after being convicted in the monthly allowance process.
- March 15
  - Hundreds of thousands of people in Brazil protest against corruption and denounce the government of President Dilma Rousseff.

=== April ===
- April 12:
  - 2015–16 protests in Brazil: A second nationwide wave of anti-government protests are held. Police estimate 696,000 participants with organizers claiming 1.5 million, and demonstrators again demanding Rousseff's resignation or impeachment.

=== July ===
- July 7: Two million people attend the 19th São Paulo Gay Pride Parade on Avenida Paulista in São Paulo.

=== August ===
- August 6: Radio journalist Gleydson Carvalho was assassinated on air while he was hosting a live broadcast at the Radio Liberdade FM in the state of Ceará.
- August 16: In more than 200 cities, in all 26 states in the country, people protest against the Workers' Party government, calling for the removal of President Dilma Rousseff through impeachment or resignation.

=== September ===
- September 17: The Supreme Court of Brazil ruled that campaign donations from businesses should be illegal.

=== November ===
- November 5
  - Mariana dam disaster: An iron ore tailings dam in Mariana, Minas Gerais suffers a catastrophic failure, causing flooding, killing 19 and injuring over 16. The collapse destroys the village of Bento Rodrigues and releases a wave of toxic mining waste into the Doce River, eventually reaching the Atlantic Ocean in what is regarded as Brazil's worst environmental disaster.

=== December ===
- December 1: The Brazilian Institute of Geography and Statistics reports that Brazil's economy contracted 1.7% in the third quarter of 2015, with GDP down 4.5% year-on-year, marking the country's deepest recession in 25 years.
- December 2: The Brazilian Chamber of Deputies accepts the impeachment request of President Dilma Rousseff.

== Arts and culture ==
- 2014–15 Brazil network television schedule
- 2015–16 Brazil network television schedule
- 2015 in Brazilian television
- List of Brazilian films of 2015

== Sports ==
- 2015 in Brazilian football
- Brazil at the 2015 Pan American Games
- UFC Fight Night: Bigfoot vs. Mir

== Deaths ==
=== January ===
- January 4: Haroldo Lara, 80, Olympic swimmer (1952, 1956).
- January 12: Inge Vermeulen, 30, Brazilian-born Dutch field hockey player (national team), European champion (2009).
- January 16: Vivaldo Frota, 86, Governor of Amazonas (1990–1991).
- January 20: Ricardo dos Santos, 24, surfer, shot.
- January 24: Maria Della Costa, 89, actress (Brasileiras e Brasileiros), pulmonary edema.
- January 29: José Martins da Silva, 78, Roman Catholic prelate, Archbishop of Porto Velho (1982–1997).

=== February ===
- February 2: Dalmo Gaspar, 82, footballer (Santos).
- February 4: Odete Lara, 85, actress, heart attack.
- February 12: Tomie Ohtake, 101, Japanese-born Brazilian artist, heart failure.
- February 20: David Martins Miranda, 78, evangelist and founder of the God is Love Pentecostal Church.
- February 22: Renato Rocha, 53, musician and songwriter (Legião Urbana), cardiac arrest.

=== March ===
- March 3: Octávio Mobiglia, 83, Olympic swimmer (1952, 1956).
- March 8: Inezita Barroso, 90, folk singer.
- March 14: Therezinha Zerbini, 86, lawyer and feminist activist.
- March 27: Carlos Falchi, 70, Brazilian-born American accessories designer.

=== April ===
- April 9: João Alves dos Santos, 58, Roman Catholic prelate, Bishop of Paranaguá.
- April 10: Bárbara Heliodora, 91, theatre critic.
- April 12: Paulo Brossard, 90, jurist and politician.
- April 13: Antônio Alberto Guimarães Rezende, 89, Roman Catholic prelate, Bishop of Caetité (1981–2002).
- April 20:
  - Cláudio Cunha, 68, actor.
  - Pedro Eugênio, 65, politician, MP (1998–2014), complications from surgery.
- April 27: Inês Etienne Romeu, 72, political prisoner.
- April 28: Antônio Abujamra, 82, actor and director.
- April 29:
  - Valmir Louruz, 71, football manager (Juventude, Pelotas).
  - Rodrigo Gularte, 42, drug trafficker

=== May ===
- May 2: Sarah Correa, 22, swimmer, struck by car.
- May 4: Vicente Joaquim Zico, 88, Roman Catholic prelate, Coadjutor Archbishop (1980–1990) and Archbishop of Belém do Pará (1990–2004).
- May 10: Luiz Henrique da Silveira, 75, Senator (since 2011), Governor of Santa Catarina (2003–2006, 2007–2010), Minister of Science and Technology (1987–1988), heart attack.
- May 14: Geraldo Majela de Castro, 84, Roman Catholic prelate, Coadjutor Bishop (1982–1988) and Archbishop of Montes Claros (1988–2007).
- May 16: Elias Gleizer, 81, actor, circulatory failure.
- May 26: Ubirajara Ribeiro Martins, 82, entomologist.

=== June ===
- June 8: Aldo da Rosa, 97, electrical engineer.
- June 12:
  - Fernando Brant, 68, writer.
  - José Messias, 86, musician and television personality.
- June 14: Zito, 82, Brazilian footballer, World Cup-winning team member (1958, 1962), complications of a stroke.
- June 22: Carlinhos, 77, football player and coach.
- June 24: Cristiano Araújo, 29, singer and songwriter, traffic collision.

=== July ===
- July 21: Luiz Paulo Conde, 80, architect and Mayor of Rio de Janeiro (1997–2001).

=== August ===
- August 2: Içami Tiba, 74, psychiatrist and writer.
- August 26: Carmelo Domênico Recchia, 93, Italian-born Brazilian Roman Catholic prelate, last Territorial Abbot of Claraval (1976–1999).

=== September ===
- September 4: Joel Rufino dos Santos, 74, historian and writer.
- September 5: Alacid Nunes, 90, Governor of Pará (1966–1971, 1979–1983).
- September 13:
  - Betty Lago, 60, actress, gallbladder cancer.
  - Vivinho, 54, footballer (Vasco).
- September 30: Caio César Ignácio Cardoso de Melo, 27, Brazilian voice actor (Harry Potter) and policeman, shot.

=== October ===
- October 4:
  - José Eduardo Dutra, 58, businessman (Petrobras) and politician, Senator (since 1994).
  - João Leithardt Neto, 57, footballer, Olympic silver medalist (1984), liver cancer.
- October 7:
  - Maria Lúcia Prandi, 70, academic and politician, cancer.
  - Ângelo da Cunha Pinto, 66, Brazilian-Portuguese chemist.
- October 15: Carlos Alberto Brilhante Ustra, 83, military officer, cancer.
- October 20: Yoná Magalhães, 80, actress.
- October 27: Ada Chaseliov, 63, telenovela actress, lymphoma.
- October 28: Jorge Scarso, 99, Italian-born Brazilian Roman Catholic prelate, Bishop of Patos de Minas (1967–1992).
- October 29: Lucídio Portela Nunes, 93, Governor of Piauí (1979–1983).

=== November ===
- November 6: Beni Veras, 80, Governor of Ceará (2002).
- November 7: João Verle, 75, Mayor of Porto Alegre (2002–2004).
- November 9: Sebastião do Rego Barros Netto, 75, lawyer and diplomat, Ambassador to Russia (1990–1994) and Argentina (1999–2001), fall from building.
- November 27: José Benedito Simão, 64, Roman Catholic prelate, Bishop of Assis (since 2009).
- November 28: Nauro Machado, 80, poet.

=== December ===
- December 5: Marília Pêra, 72, actress (Pixote, Better Days Ahead), lung cancer.
- December 9: Juvenal Juvêncio, 81, lawyer and sports director.
- December 19: Selma Reis, 55, actress and singer.
- December 21: Jupiter Apple, singer-songwriter and multi-instrumentalist (TNT, Os Cascavelletes), multiple organ failure.

== See also ==
- 2015 in Brazilian football
