= Inauguration of Dilma Rousseff =

Inauguration of Dilma Rousseff may refer to:

- First inauguration of Dilma Rousseff, 2011
- Second inauguration of Dilma Rousseff, 2015
