= Pedro Eugenio =

Pedro Eugenio might refer to:

- Pedro Eugênio (1949–2015), Brazilian politician
- Pedro Eugénio (born 1990), Portuguese footballer
- Pedro Eugenio Aramburu (1903–1970), Argentine soldier and politician
- Pedro Eugenio Pelletier, French-Dominican soldier
