= José Belvino do Nascimento =

Brazilian Roman Catholic bishop (1932–2019)

- Bishop of Divinópolis
- Church: Catholic Church
- Diocese: Diocese of Divinópolis
- In office: 27 February 1989 – 11 February 2009
- Predecessor: José Costa Campos
- Successor: Tarcísio Nascentes dos Santos
- Previous posts: Coadjutor Bishop of Patos de Minas (1987-1989); Bishop of Itumbiara (1981-1987)

Orders
- Ordination: 2 December 1956
- Consecration: 29 September 1981 by Oscar de Oliveira

Personal details
- Born: 29 December 1932 Mercês, Minas Gerais, Brazil
- Died: 8 January 2019 (aged 86)

José Belvino do Nascimento (29 December 1932 – 8 January 2019) was a Brazilian Roman Catholic bishop.

== Early life ==
José Belvino do Nascimento was born in Brazil and was ordained to the priesthood in 1956. He served as bishop of the Roman Catholic Diocese of Itumbiara, Brazil, from 1981 to 1987. He then served as coadjutor bishop of the Roman Catholic Diocese of Patos de Minas, Brazil, from 1987 to 1989. Nascimento then served as bishop of the Roman Catholic Diocese of Divinópolis, Brazil, from 1989 to 2009.
