= Bárbara Heliodora (theatre critic) =

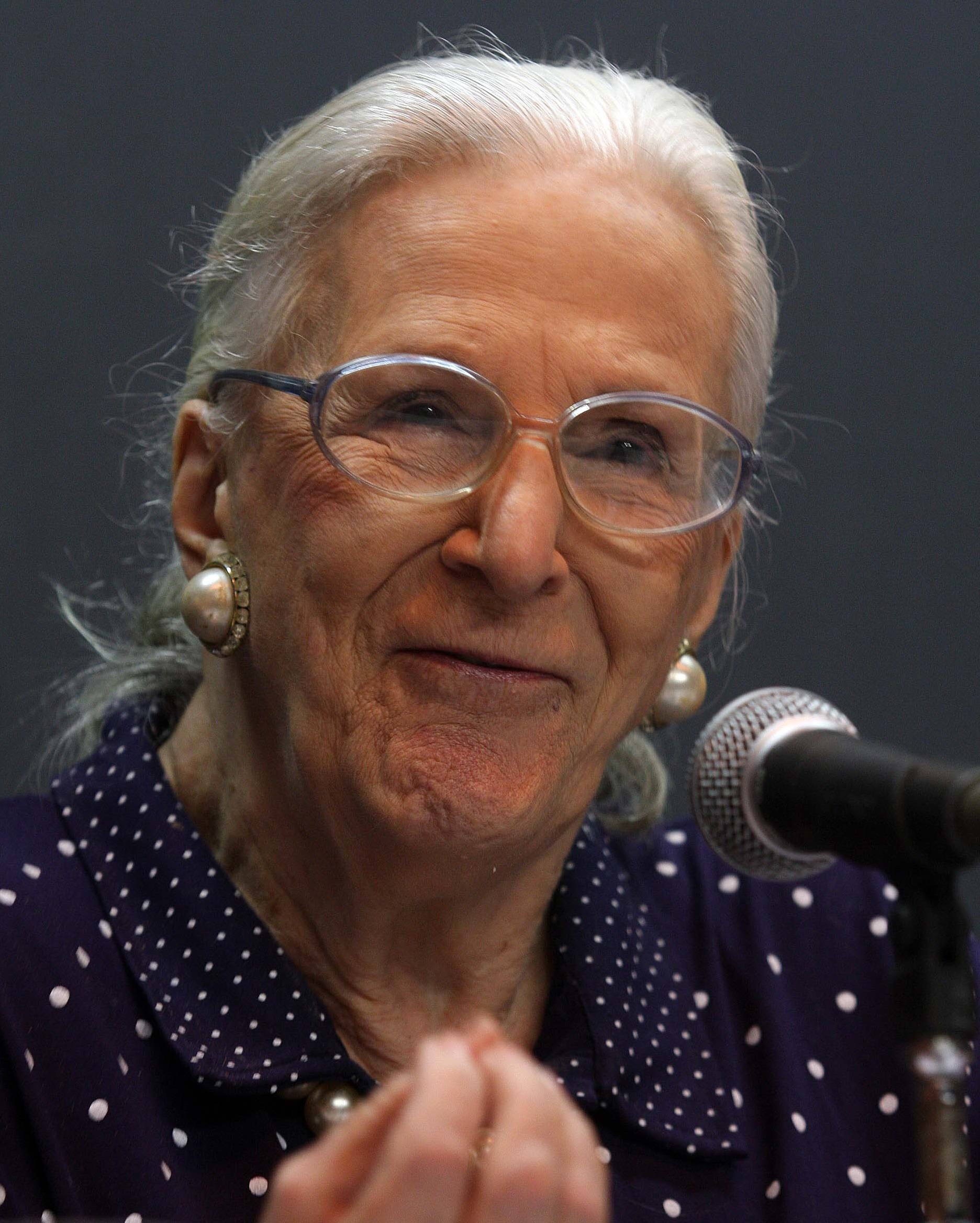
- Born: Heliodora Carneiro de Mendonça; 29 August 1923; Rio de Janeiro, Brazil
- Died: 10 April 2015 (aged 91); Rio de Janeiro, Brazil
- Occupation: theatre critic

Heliodora Carneiro de Mendonça (August 29, 1923 – April 10, 2015), better known by her pseudonym Bárbara Heliodora, was a Brazilian theatre critic, writer and translator, specialized in the works of William Shakespeare.

She was awarded by the Ministry of Culture of France with the Ordre des Arts et des Lettres.

== Biography ==
She was born on August 29, 1923. Her parents were Anna Amélia and Marcos Carneiro de Mendonça. Heliodora began theatre criticism at age 35.

From 1964 to 1967, she left criticism to work as director of the National Theater Service (SNT). Later, she turned solely to teaching as a professor of theater history at the National Theater Conservatory and, later, as a full professor of the same subject at the Center for Letters and Arts at Uni-Rio, a position she held until her retirement in 1985. Later, she also taught postgraduate courses at the University of São Paulo (USP), where in 1975 she defended her doctoral thesis entitled "The Dramatic Expression of the Political Man in Shakespeare", which was later transformed into a book. She also published Algumas Reflexões sobre o Teatro Brasileiro in 1972. In 1986, she returned to journalistic criticism at Visão magazine, later moving on to newspapers such as O Globo, where she established herself. In the 1990s, she returned to teaching on the master's course in theater at Uni-Rio.

She also published texts in Estado de S. Paulo. One of her best-known works is Falando de Shakespeare, a expressão dramática do homem político em Shakespeare e Martins Pena: uma introdução. She was also considered an "inveterate polemicist".

Heliodora died on April 10, 2015.
