= Cláudio Cunha =

Brazilian actor

Cláudio Francisco Cunha (July 29, 1946 – April 20, 2015) was a Brazilian actor in film and television, and writer. He was married to Simone Carvalho.

Cunha was born in São Paulo.

He died on April 20, 2015, aged 68, in Porto Alegre, Rio Grande do Sul, Brazil.

== Filmography ==
- Oh! Rebuceteio (1984)
- Karina, Objeto do Prazer (1981)
- A Dama da Zona (1979)
- Amada Amante (1978)
- Damas do Prazer (1978)
- A Praia do Pecado (1977)
- Snuff, Vítimas do Prazer (1977)
- O Clube dos Infiéis (1974)
- O Poderoso Machão (1974)
- Sob o Domínio do Sexo (1973)
- As Mulheres Amam por Conveniência (1972)
