= First inauguration of Dilma Rousseff =

2011 Presidential Inauguration of Dilma Rousseff
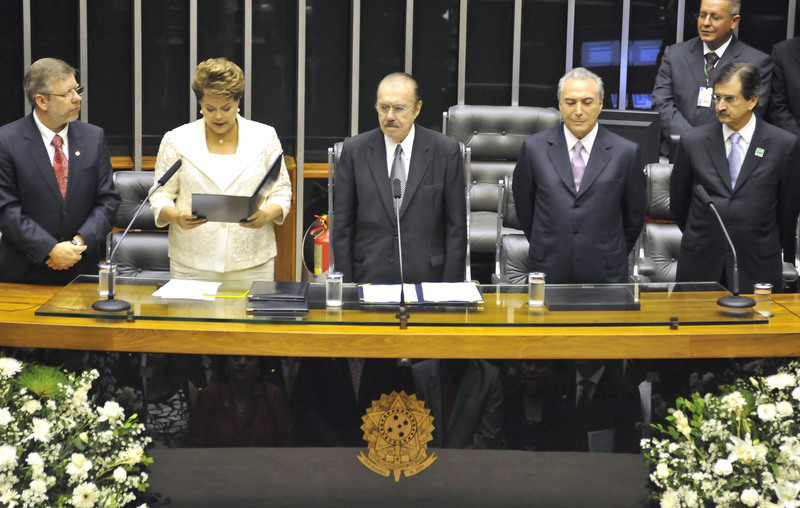
- Dilma Rousseff takes the oath of office of the president of Brazil.
- Date: 1 January 2011; 15 years ago
- Time: 3:00 pm (BRST)
- Location: National Congress of Brazil Brasília, DF
- Participants: Dilma Rousseff; 36th president of Brazil — Assuming office Michel Temer; 24th vice president of Brazil — Assuming office José Sarney; President of the Federal Senate — Administering oath

The first inauguration of Dilma Rousseff as the 36th president of Brazil took place on Saturday, January 1, 2011. This inauguration marked the beginning of the four-year term of Dilma Rousseff as President and Michel Temer as Vice President. The event had been awaited with some expectation, since Rousseff became the first woman in the history of Brazil to take office as President. It was also the first inaugural ceremony of the New Republic and of the democratic rule in which an outgoing President passed his office to a successor belonging to the same political party as him – the Workers' Party.

== Context ==
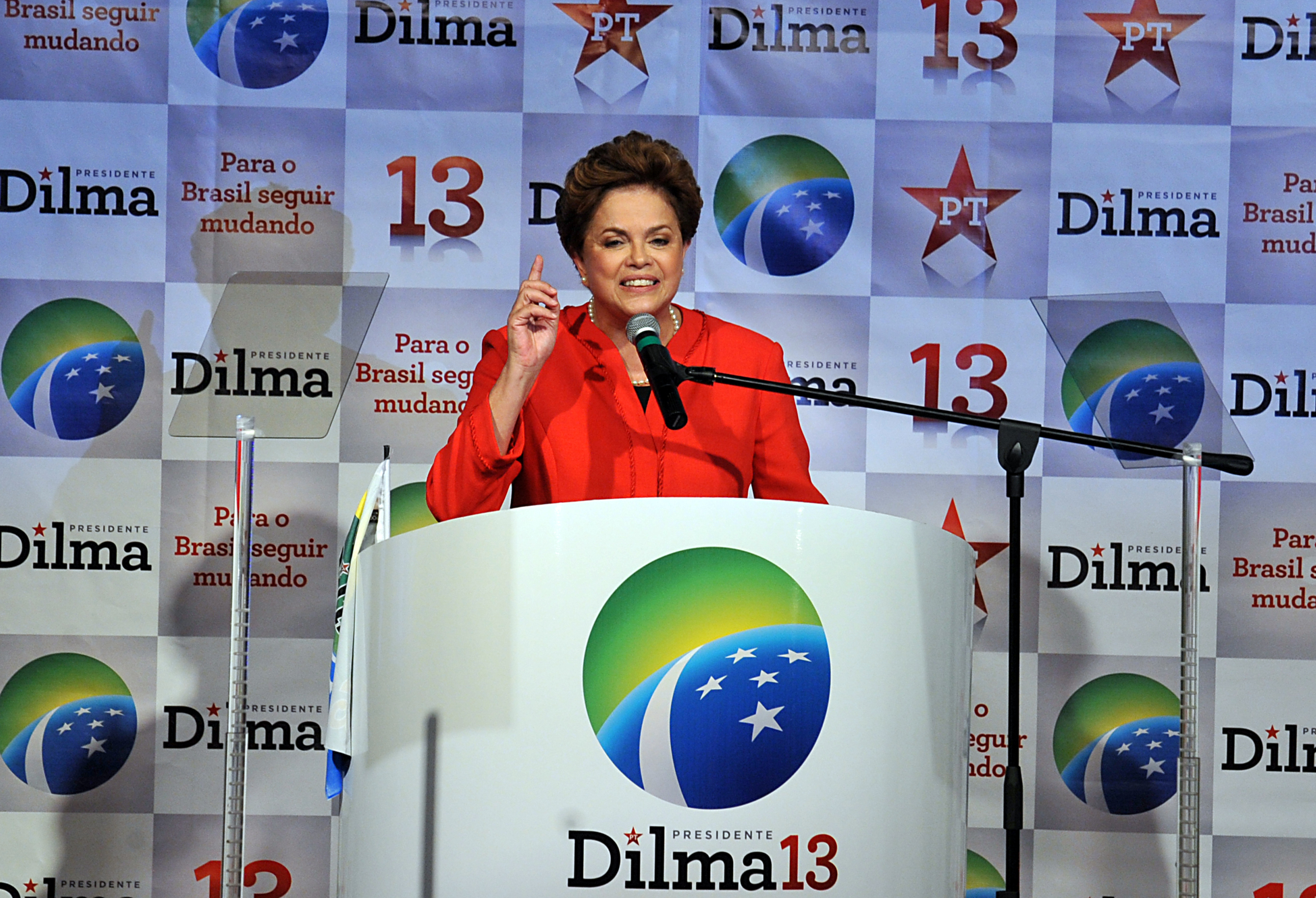
Rousseff campaigning under the continuity symbol at the Workers' Party National Convention.

The inauguration marked the formal culmination of the Presidential transition of Dilma Rousseff that began when she won the Brazilian presidential election on October 31, 2010, and became the President-elect. The results were certified by the Superior Electoral Court on December 17, 2010.

Rousseff, who campaigned using the slogan "For Brazil to keep on changing", was widely celebrated as the first female president of Brazil and a symbol of continuity from her highly popular predecessor, Luiz Inácio Lula da Silva. According to the Sensus polling institute, Lula might have been the most popular head of state in the world. Approved by 87% of Brazilians at the end of his term, his popularity level beat those of Michelle Bachelet (84%), Nelson Mandela (82%), and Tabaré Vázquez (80%) in their respective home countries. According to David Rothkopf, she inherited "a country with very high expectations", since Lula had "overseen an economic boom, major social reforms and the elevation of Brazil's standing to the top ranks of nations in the world".

== Planning ==
The inauguration was planned primarily by a group composed by members of the Presidential transition, the Ministries of External Relations and Defence, in addition to the Presidency of the Republic. Although the election was scheduled for October 3 (first round) and October 31, 2010 (second round), the group began planning the inaugural ceremony even prior to that.

=== Invitations ===
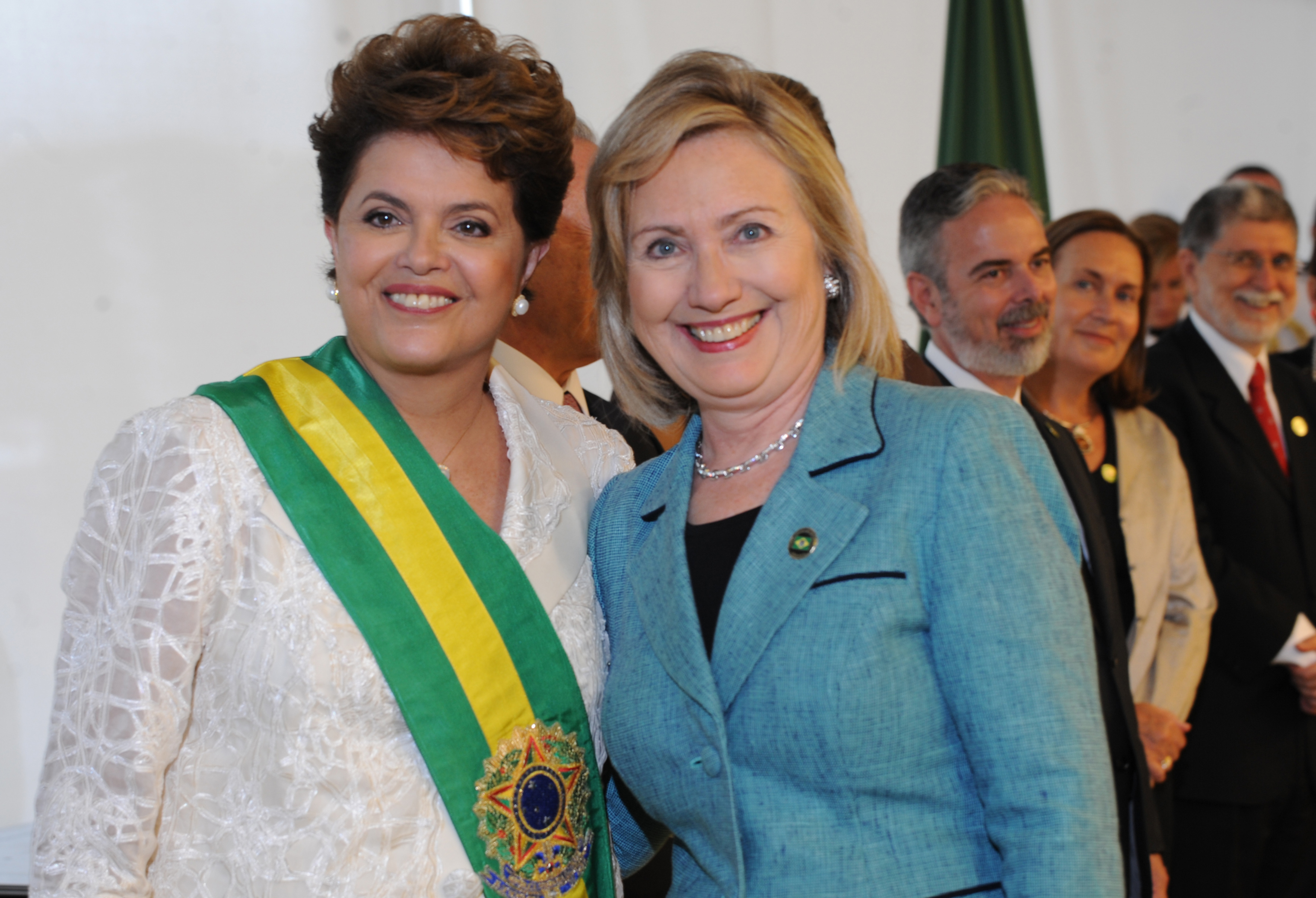
One of the invitations for the inauguration was U.S. Secretary of State Hillary Clinton, here greeting President Dilma Rousseff, January 1, 2011.

The group organizing the inauguration distributed invitations for the swearing in ceremony to foreign and national authorities, in addition to Rousseff's and Temer's relatives. The ceremonial body of the Senate had sent invitations to all Federal Deputies and Senators of the current legislature, and also to those who will be sworn in on February 1. The invitations were not transferable, each one of them having a barcode to identify the guests by name and photo.

Until December 30, 2010, the publishing house of the Senate had printed 1,500 invitations for Rousseff's swearing in. The National Congress had been expected a total of 2,000 guests for the ceremony, but ultimately a thousand guests witnessed Rousseff's and Temer's swearing in on the floor of the Chamber of Deputies, where a solemn session of the Congress was held. Last minute invitations could have been printed at the request of the Ministry of External Relations and the federal government.

The swearing in was accompanied by representatives of 132 countries. According to the Presidency of the Republic, ten Presidents, nine Prime-Ministers and one Vice-President attended the ceremony, in addition to 132 ambassadors and United Nations representatives. The vast majority of leaders which attended were from Latin America. Representatives of major trade partners of Brazil, such as France, India, and China, were absent. According to Celso Amorim, the non-attendance was due to the fact that the Brazilian inauguration is held on January 1. "We always wish that more people attend, but the date is really unfortunate", he said.

For the reception held at the Itamaraty Palace, the Ministry of External Relations issued 2,500 invitations at the request of the Presidential transition and the Presidency of the Republic. Over 300 foreign authorities attended, in addition to Governor of São Paulo Geraldo Alckmin, which had been absent from the inaugural ceremony.

=== Rehearsals ===
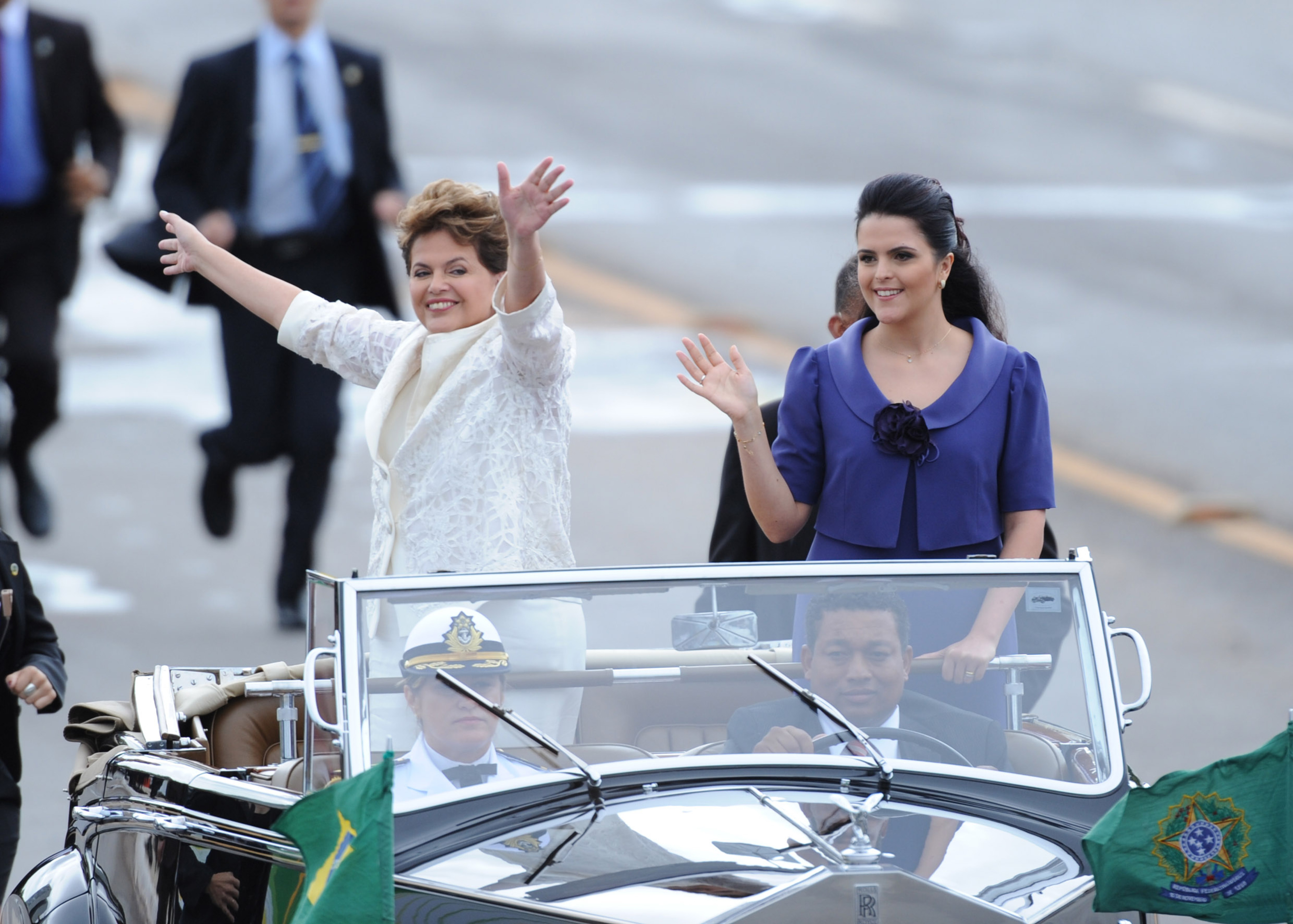
Rousseff parades in the presidential Rolls Royce next to her daughter Paula Rousseff.

On December 19, 2010, the first rehearsal for the inaugural ceremony of Rousseff was held. Juliana Rebelo, a civil servant of the Senate, acted as her during the rehearsal, which was closely watched by journalists and curious passers-by. The second and final rehearsal was held on December 26, this time featuring the 1952 Rolls-Royce Silver Wraith which serves as the President's celebratory car. That same day, Rousseff told the group responsible for organizing her inauguration that she will not be taking her mother nor her daughter with her at the Silver Wraith. Traditionally, the President-elect parades alongside his spouse, but Rousseff is divorced. Nevertheless, at the inauguration, Rousseff changed her mind and took daughter Paula to parade with her.

The news portal G1, which accompanied the rehearsal, anticipated that the inauguration would be "quite a feminine party". Important female figures in Brazil's history were honored with panels spread across the Monumental Axis.

== Inaugural events ==
=== Arena Brasil ===
The Ministry of Culture organized the cultural part of the inauguration, having provided a budget of 1.5 million reais (around 0.9 million U.S. dollars) for the event. The first part of cultural presentations, named Arena Brasil, began at 10:00 am BRST (12:00 UTC) and ended at 2:00 pm, with the start of the official inauguration ceremony.

Arena Brasil honored the regions of Brazil. From 10:00 am until 12:00 pm (14:00 UTC) there were presentations of children's groups. There were also musical presentations from 10:00 am (12:00 UTC) until 2:00 pm (16:00 UTC) in each of the four tents spread along the Monumental Axis, honoring the North, Northeast Region, Brazil, Southeast and South regions of Brazil.

The Arena Brasil project, which began at Rousseff's inauguration, is expected to continue in civic dates throughout Brazil. Five major events are planned for 2011. The next Arena Brasil event will be held in the Northeast on April 22 to commemorate the date which marks the arrival of Pedro Álvares Cabral in Brazil. On August 11, the Black Consciousness Day will feature an Arena Brasil event in the Southeast. The Independence Day will feature an Arena Brasil event in the South, while the Proclamation of the Republic Day will feature the project in the North.

=== Parade ===
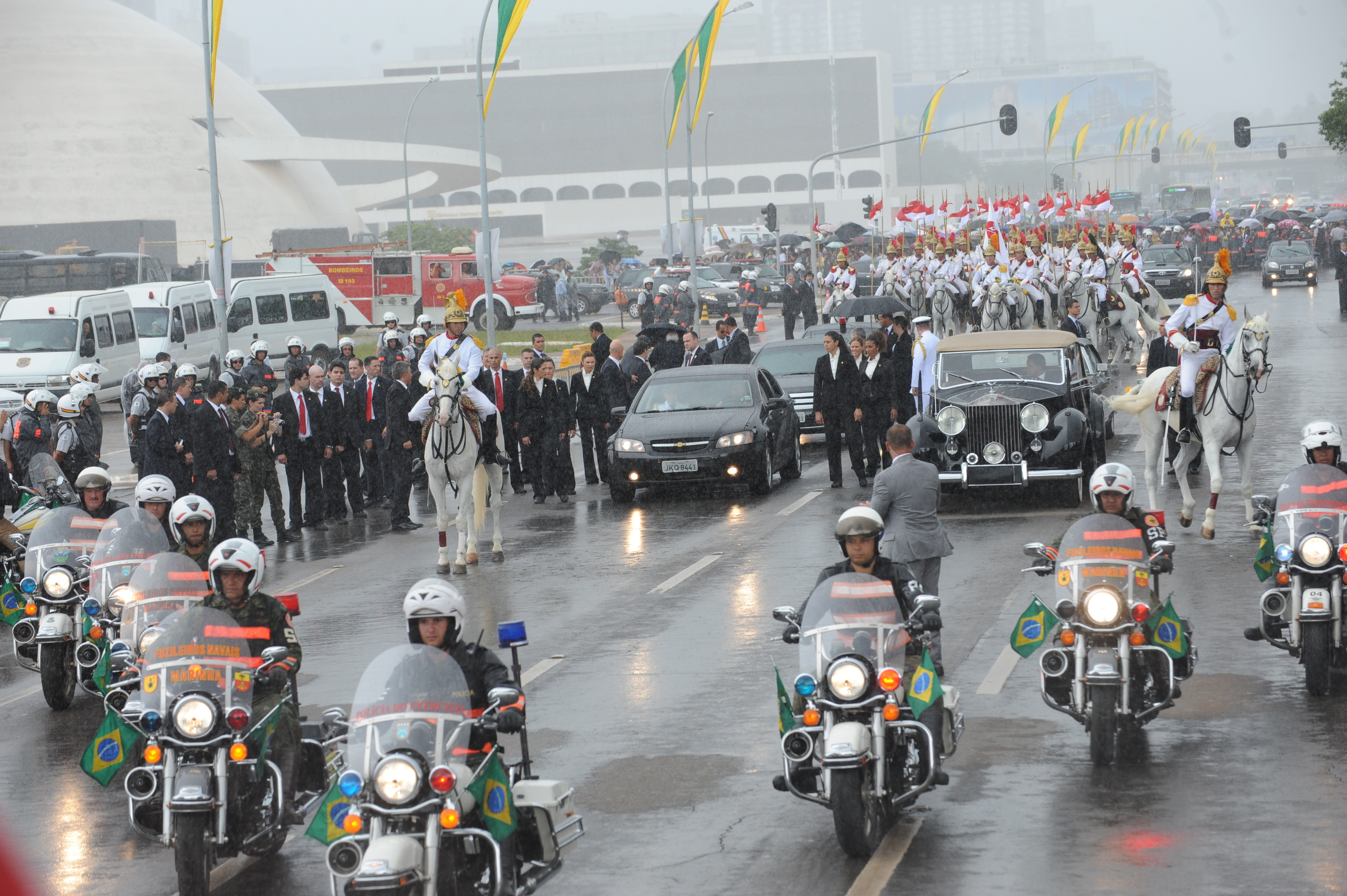
Rousseff en route to the National Congress during her inauguration parade.

Rousseff left the Granja do Torto residence at 2:00 pm (16:00 UTC) and arrived at the Cathedral of Brasília at 2:15 pm (16:15 UTC). It began to rain right after she left the residence, and she could not parade to the Congress with the hood open, frustrating the public. Nevertheless, Rousseff opened the car window to wave her hand at the public. The car wandered through the Monumental Axis, stopping at the National Congress, where, around 2:30 pm (16:30 UTC), Rousseff and Temer were received by the president of that body, José Sarney.

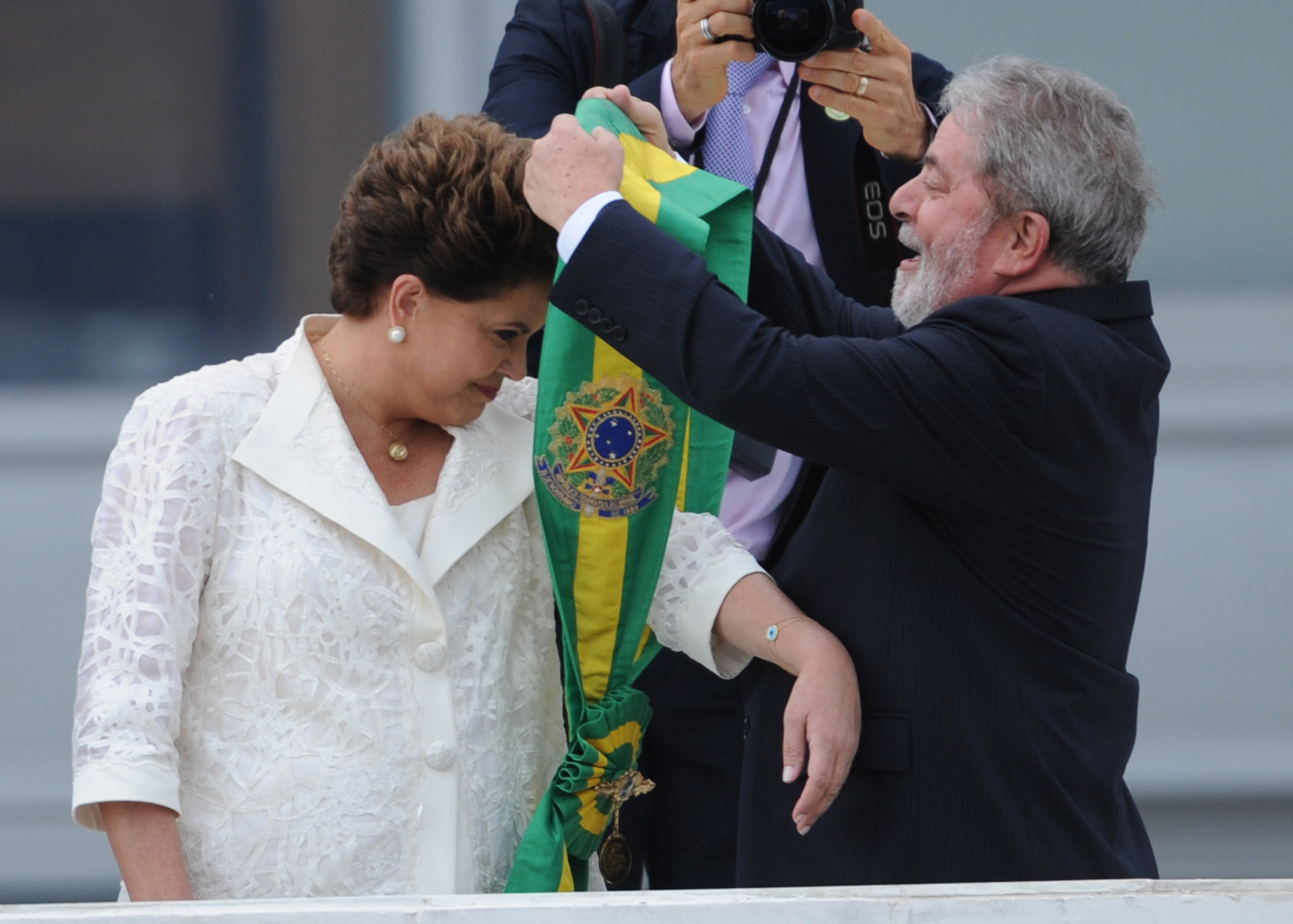
Former president Lula da Silva passes the presidential sash to Rousseff at parlatorium (speaker's platform) of the Planalto Palace.

On the floor of the Chamber, both of them signed a term agreeing with the demands of the office, and were sworn in with the oath of "maintaining, protecting and fulfilling the Federal Constitution, comply with the laws, promote the general welfare of the Brazilian people, sustain the unity, integrity and independence of Brazil". Rousseff then made her first speech as President. At around 4 pm (18:00 UTC), Rousseff and Temer left the Congress building towards the Palácio do Planalto. At 4:30 pm (18:30 UTC), they were welcomed at the presidential palace's ramp by the outgoing President Luiz Inácio Lula da Silva and his wife. Traditionally, the outgoing vice President and his wife also greet the new President, but José Alencar was undergoing colorectal cancer treatment in São Paulo's Hospital Sírio-Libanês and did not attend the inauguration.

Lula passed the presidential sash to Rousseff at the parlor (speaker's platform), located in the outer area of the palace, overlooking the Three Powers Plaza. Wearing the sash, Rousseff was greeted by heads of state and other authorities in the palace's east wing. At around 5 pm (19:00 UTC), Rousseff made her first speech to the people as President. She then inducted her 37 ministers inside the palace. Following this stage of the ceremony, Rousseff offered a reception at about 6:30 pm (20:30 UTC) for foreign authorities that were sent to Brazil to witness her inauguration. Each foreign authority had the opportunity to speak with Rousseff for 30 seconds.

=== Concerts ===
The inaugural day featured concerts by five Brazilian female singers: Elba Ramalho, Fernanda Takai, Mart'nália, Zélia Duncan, and Gaby Amarantos.

According to the newspaper Diário do Pará, the Ministry of Culture chose these singers to represent all five regions of Brazil. However, both Fernanda Takai and Mart'nalia come from the Southeast Region. Rio de Janeiro-born Zélia Duncan began her career in Brasília, while Elba Ramalho hails from Paraíba and Gaby Amarantos was born and raised in Pará. Therefore, none of the singers hails from the Southern Region.

== Attendance ==
Organisers expected over 70,000 people to attend the inaugural ceremony at the Monumental Axis. The attendance was expected to match that for Lula's first inauguration in 2003, which was attended by an estimated 70,000–120,000 people.

=== Security ===
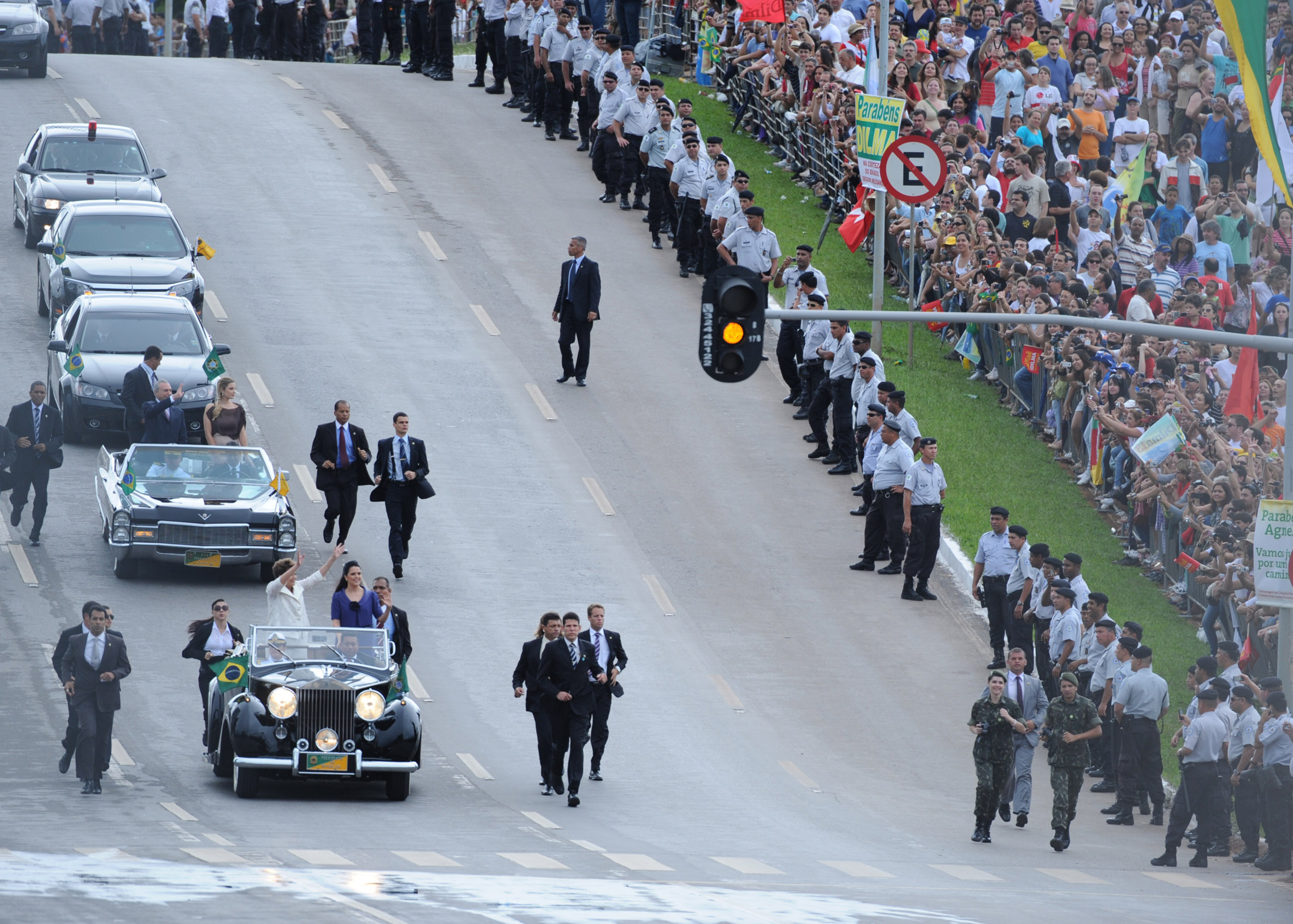
Rousseff on her way to the Planalto presidential palace.

At the first event of the inauguration, an open car parade from the Cathedral of Brasília to the National Congress, 2,650 agents of the Military Police, Civil Police, Federal Police and Federal Highway Police were present. In Congress, where the handover took place, another thousand police and military officers guarded president-elect and guests. Of this total, about 400 were soldiers from the Army, Navy and Air Force.

Throughout the parade, snipers were in strategic locations, including the roofs of public buildings, while highly trained dogs enhanced security on the sidewalks. To protect foreign representatives, including 25 heads of state or government, 650 men were deployed by the Federal Police. Rousseff's personal safety was ensured by 65 federal agents. At her request, the inner circle was formed by trained female agents, who formed a shield around her.

None of the parliamentarians were allowed to bring guests of their own to the ceremony. The invitations are individual, and a map indicating the entrance which guests had to use to get into the plenary of the Chamber were attached to them. Unlike previous inaugural ceremonies, the guests had to go through metal detectors in order to gain access to the Congress, with the exception of Deputies, Senators and heads of state. Also as a security measure, the ceremonial body of the Senate called for the cancellation of guided tours around the premises of the building starting on December 29.

== Broadcast ==
Rousseff's inauguration was broadcast nationally by all major television networks. In order to ensure that there would be no "blind spots" during the broadcast, organisers allowed helicopters from private TV networks to fly over the Monumental Axis, in addition to installing a TV Senado camera, equipped to capture images at long ranges, atop the 28th floor of the Senate Annex I building.

== Gallery ==
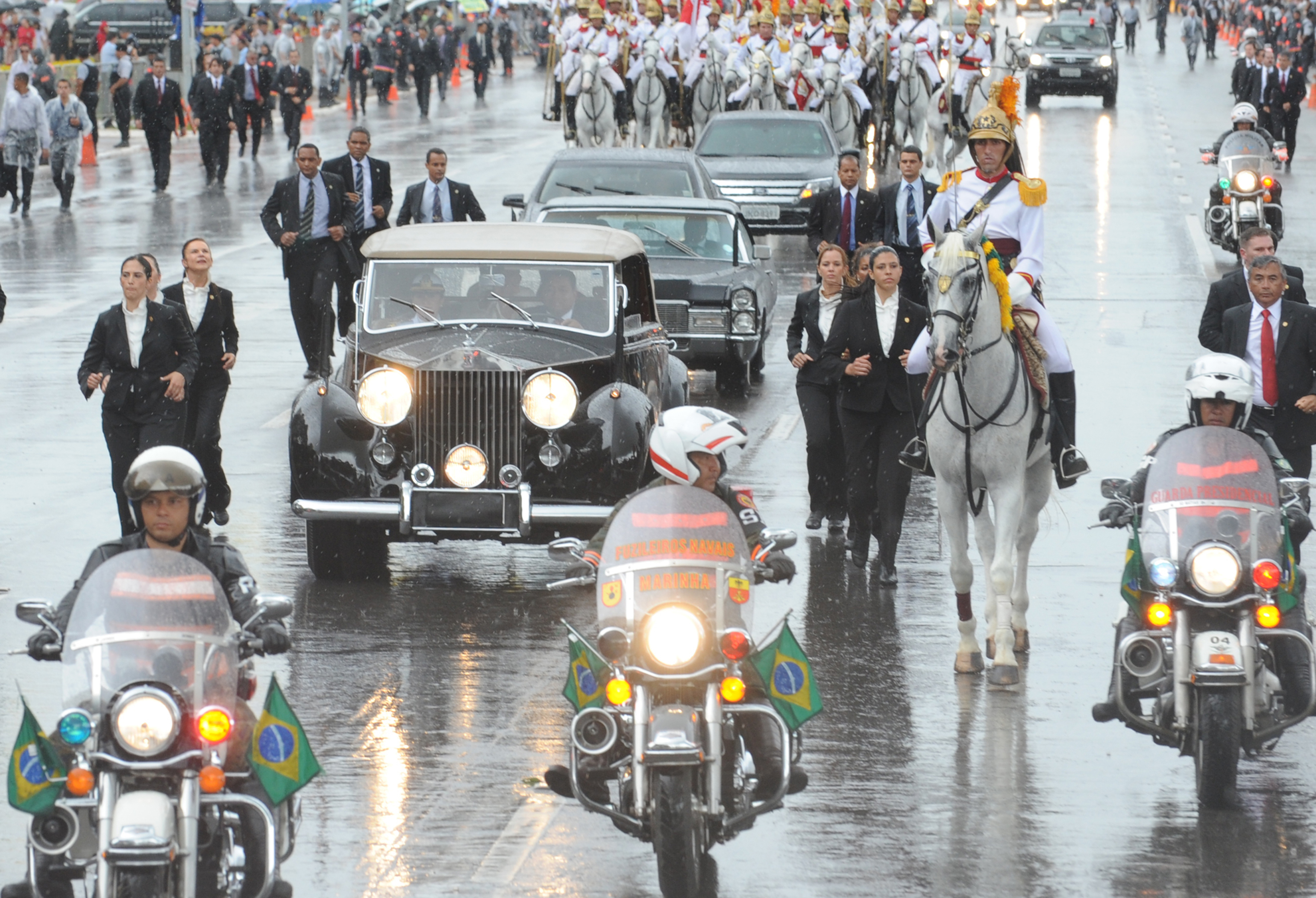
Rousseff's Inaugural Parade at the Ministries Esplanade. Police motorcycles and bodyguards surround the Presidential Rolls-Royce, followed by a 1968 Cadillac De Ville convertible used by Vice President Michel Temer.

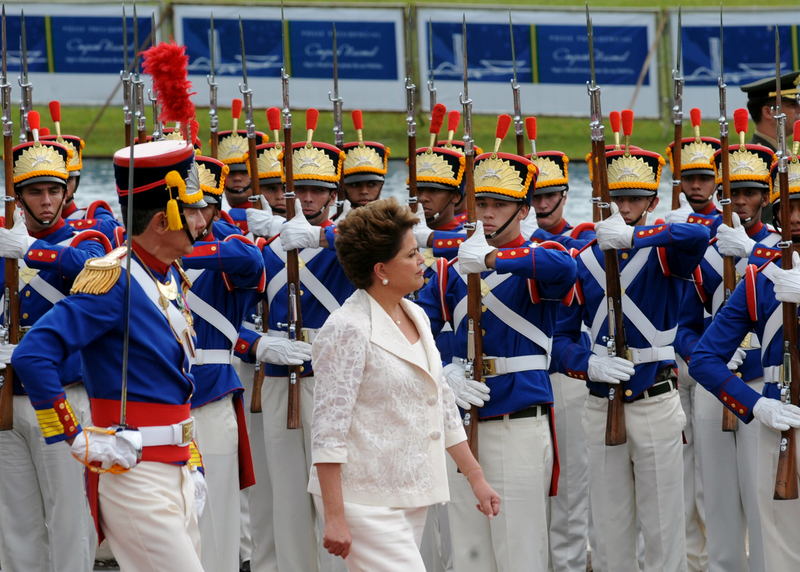
Dilma Rousseff inspecting the Presidential Guard

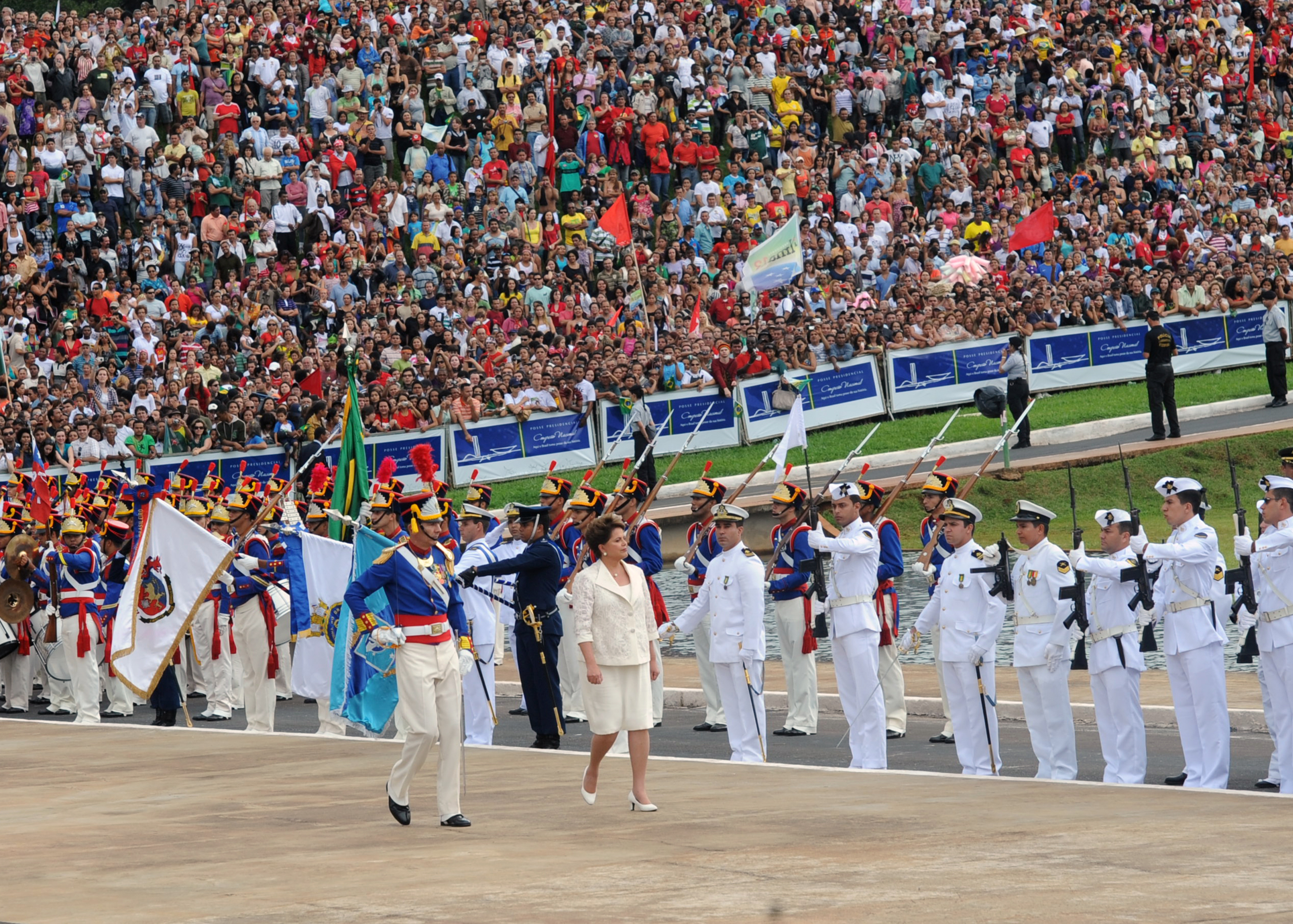
Rousseff reviews troops of the Armed Forces.

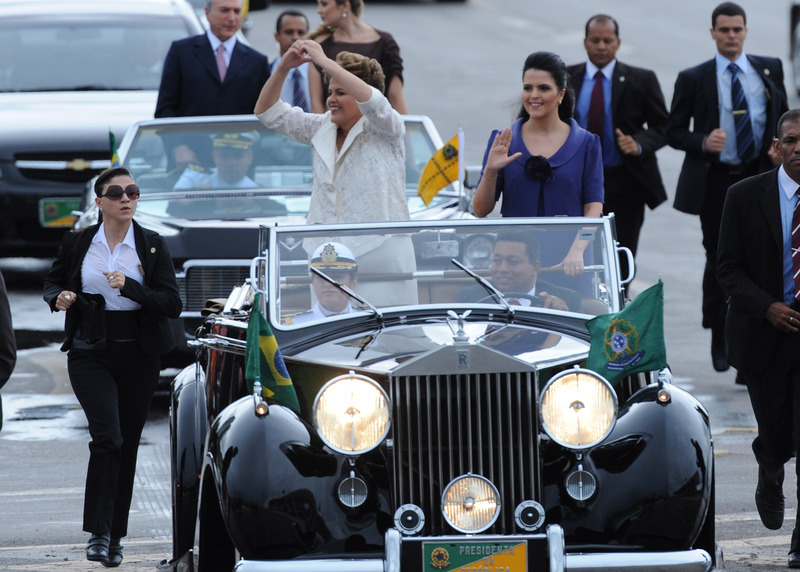
Dilma Rousseff beside her daughter Paula, en route to the Planalto Palace.

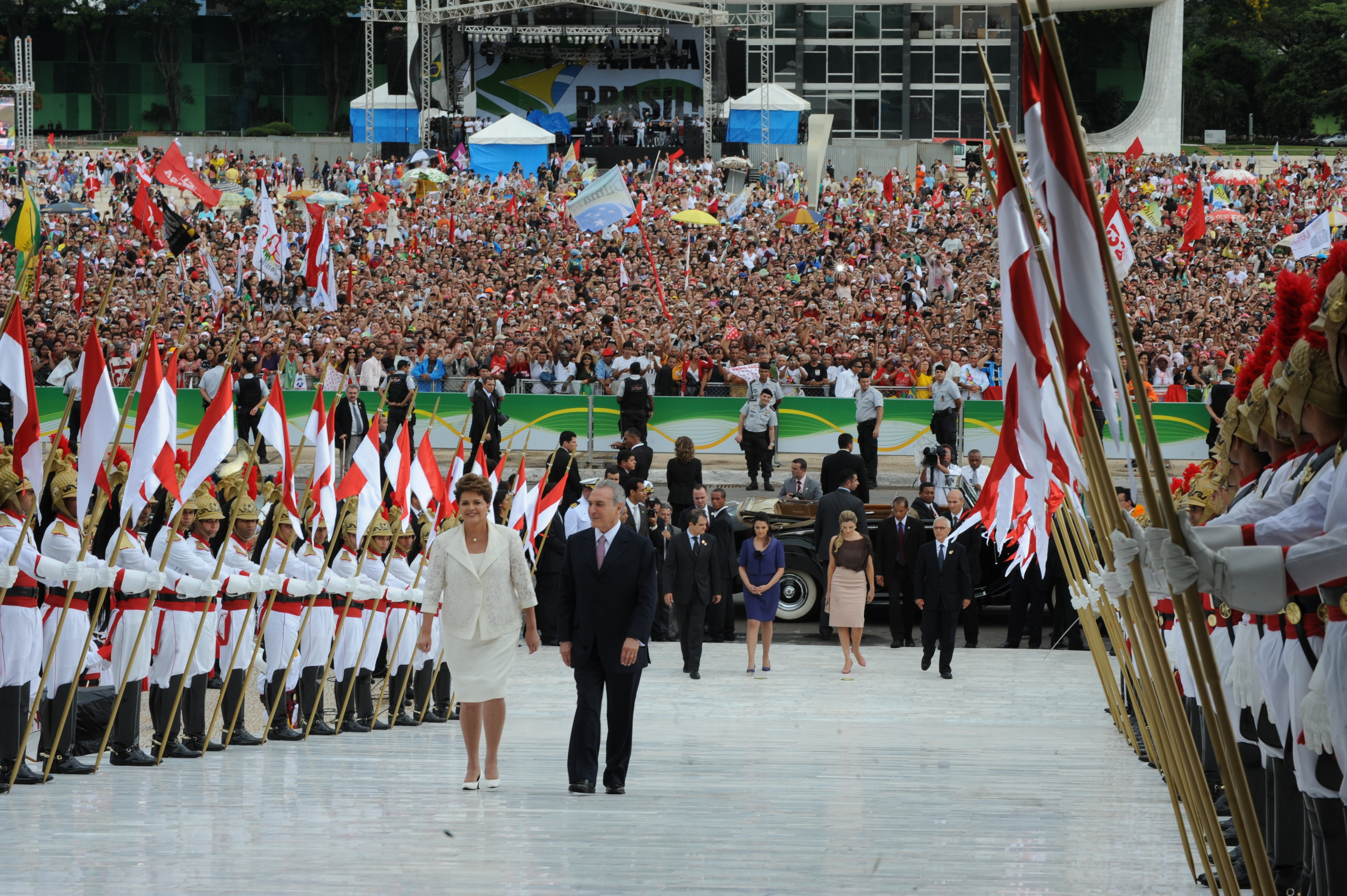
Dilma Rousseff climbs the Planalto Palace's ramp with Michel Temer.

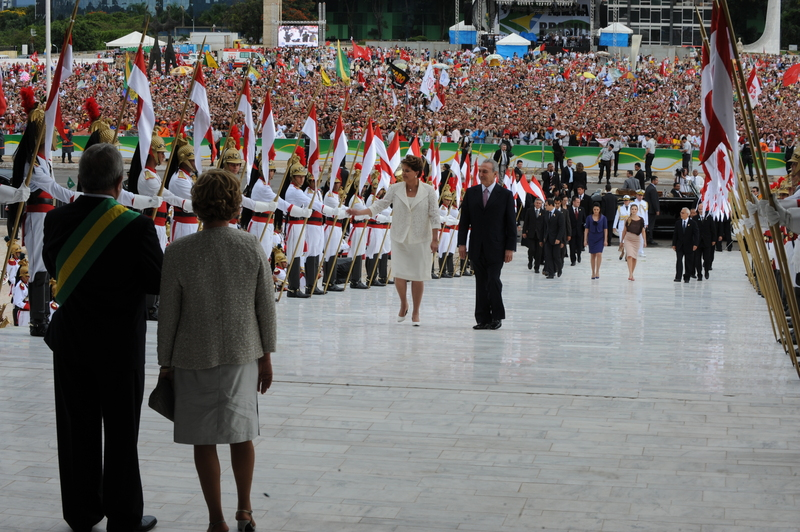
Outgoing President Luiz Inácio Lula da Silva and First Lady Marisa Letícia receive President Rousseff and Vice President Temer in front of the Planalto Palace.

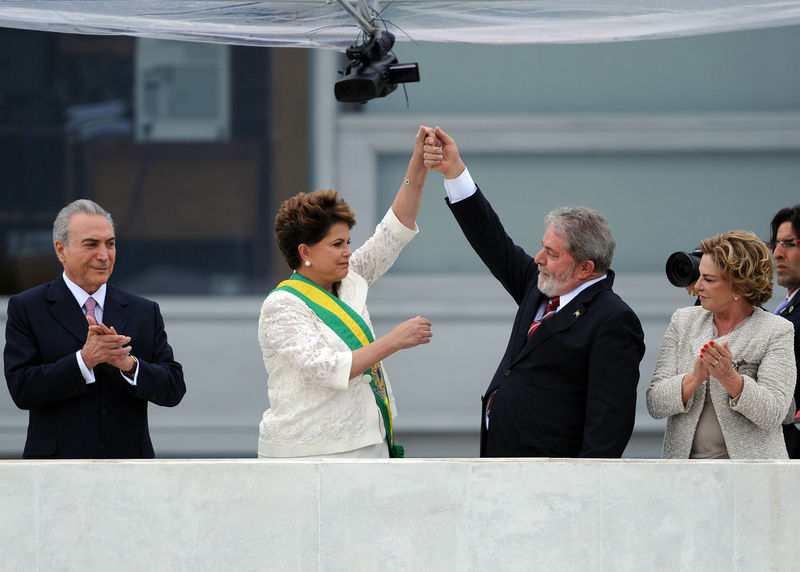
Michel Temer, Dilma Rousseff, Lula da Silva and Marisa Letícia at Rousseff's inaugural ceremony.

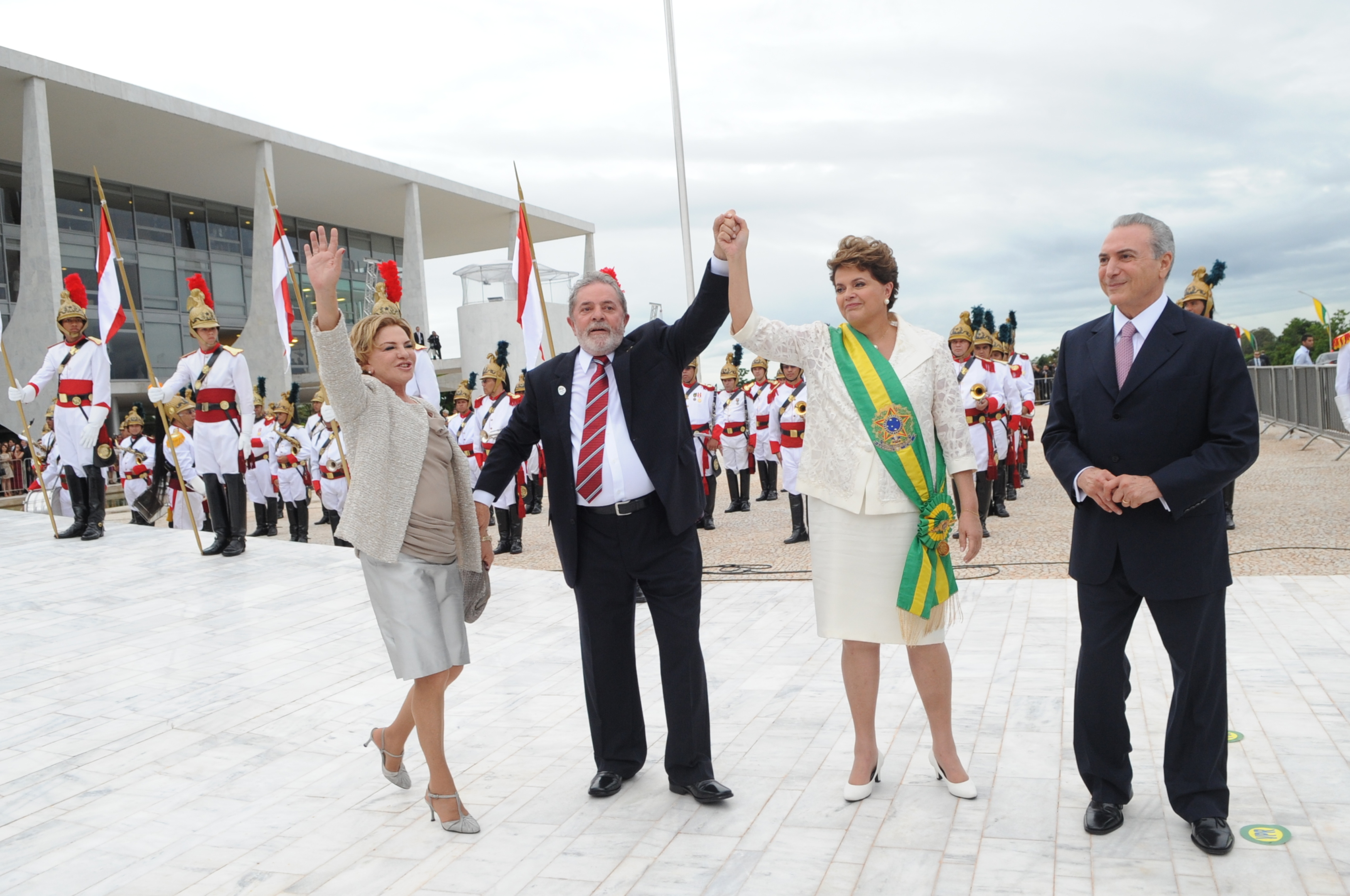
Rousseff, next to Vice President Temer, bids farewell to former President Lula and wife Marisa Letícia.

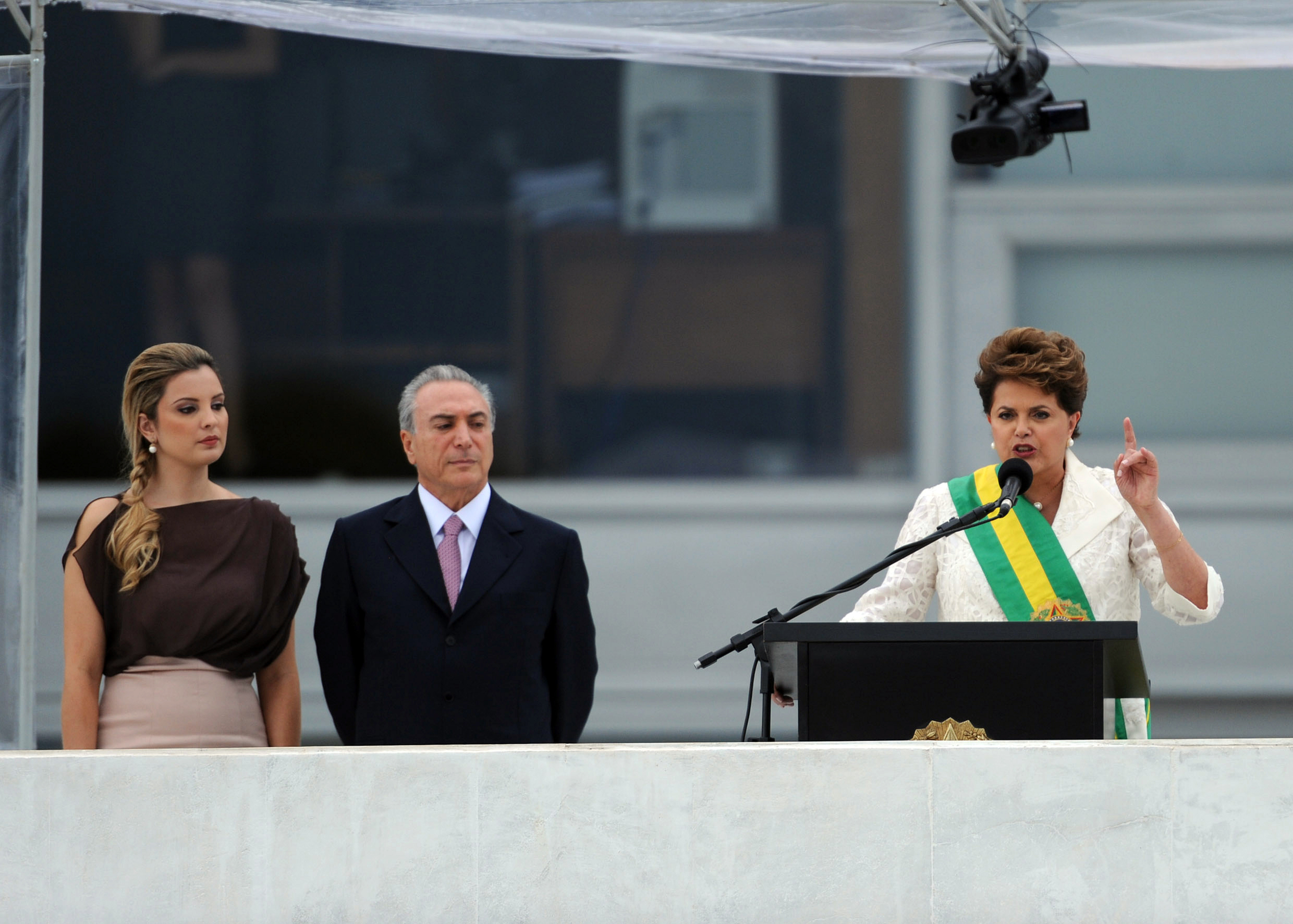
President Rousseff delivers a speech to the people on the parlatorium (speaker's platform) of the Planalto Palace. Beside her are Vice President Temer and his wife Marcela.

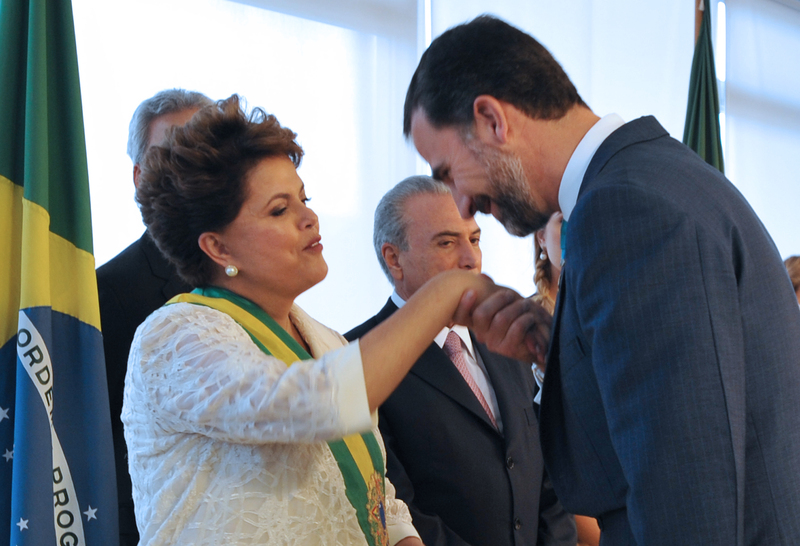
Felipe of Spain, then Prince of Asturias, kisses the hand of President Rousseff.

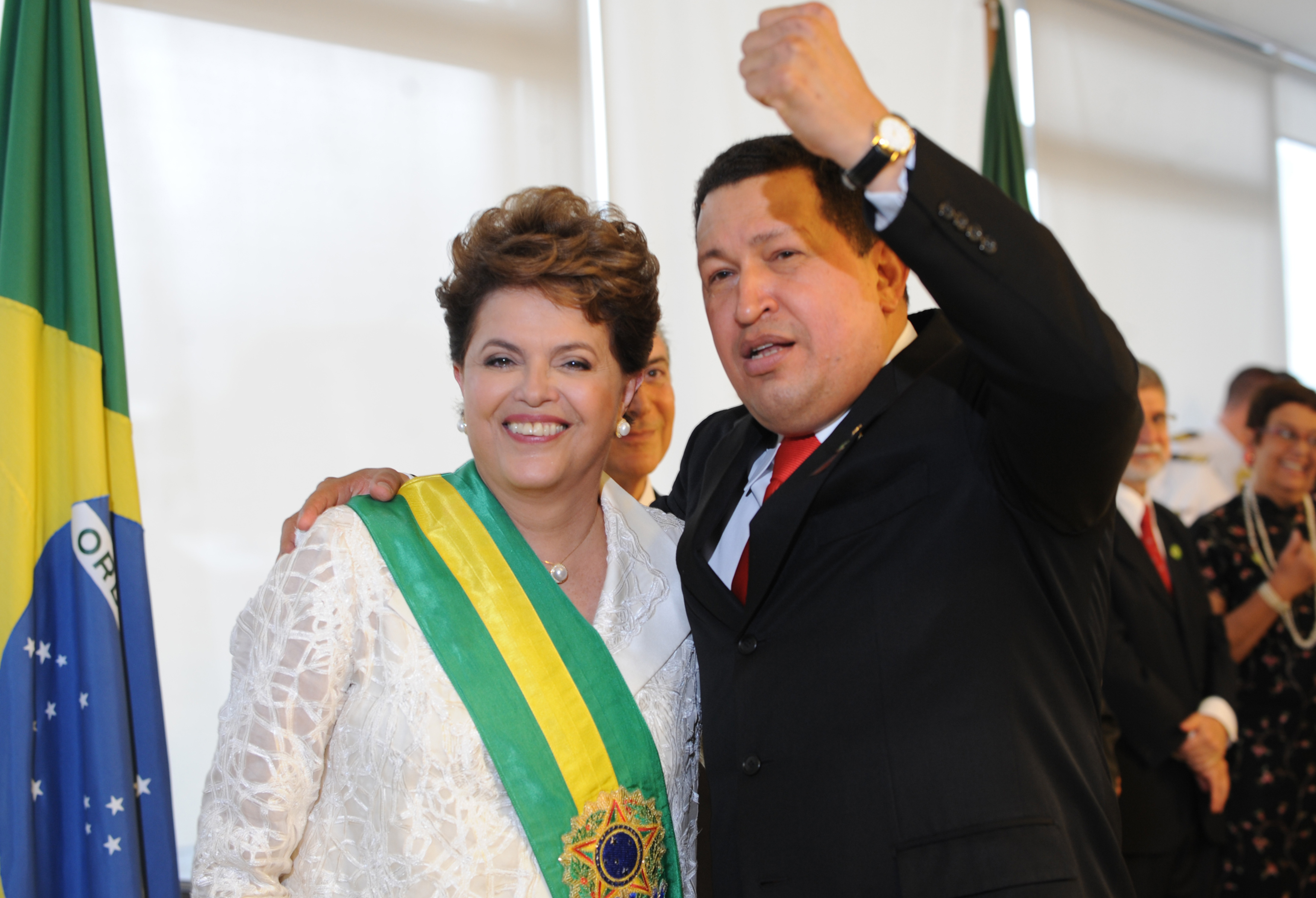
President Rousseff with President Hugo Chávez of Venezuela.

== See also ==
- Second inauguration of Dilma Rousseff
