= Octávio Mobiglia =

Brazilian swimmer (1931–2015)

Personal information
- Full name: Octávio Mobiglia
- Nationality: Brazil
- Born: April 9, 1931 Ribeirão Preto, São Paulo, Brazil
- Died: March 2015 (aged 83)

Sport
- Sport: Swimming
- Strokes: Breaststroke

Octávio Mobiglia (April 9, 1931 – March 2015) was an Olympic breaststroke swimmer from Brazil, who participated at two Summer Olympics for his native country. He was born in Ribeirão Preto. At the 1952 Summer Olympics in Helsinki, he swam the 200-metre breaststroke, not reaching the finals. At the 1956 Summer Olympics in Melbourne, he swam the 200-metre breaststroke, not reaching the finals, being disqualified.
