= Sebastião do Rego Barros Netto =

Brazilian lawyer and diplomat

Sebastião do Rego Barros Netto (January 27, 1940 – November 9, 2015) was a Brazilian lawyer and diplomat. He served as Brazil's last Ambassador to the Soviet Union from January 26, 1990, until the country's dissolution on December 26, 1991. Following the collapse of the Soviet Union, he served as Brazil's first post-Soviet Ambassador to both Russia and Ukraine from December 1991 until December 1994. His final diplomatic posting was as Ambassador to Argentina from January 26, 1999, until December 27, 2001.

Rego Barros also served as the Director General of the National Agency of Petroleum, Natural Gas and Biofuels (ANP) from 2001 to 2005.

Sebastião do Rego Barros Netto died from a fall from his apartment, located on the 11th floor of an apartment building in Copacabana, Rio de Janeiro, on November 9, 2015, at the age of 75. Rego Barros, who was wearing a suit and tie, was found next to an open book on former President Getúlio Vargas, indicating that he may have been reading at the time of the fall. There was no sign of violence or a struggle at the scene. He was survived by his wife of 34 years, Maria Cristina de Lamare Rego Barros, and three children.
