= Carmelo Domênico Recchia =

Italian prelate of the Roman Catholic Church

Carmelo Domênico Recchia, O. Cist
- Abbot of Claraval (emeritus)
- Church: Roman Catholic Church
- See: Territorial abbey of Claraval
- In office: 1976 - 1999
- Predecessor: Pedro José Agostini
- Successor: none

Orders
- Ordination: 4 August 1946

Personal details
- Born: 14 December 1921; Sora, Italy
- Died: 26 August 2015 (aged 93)

Carmelo Domênico Recchia, O. Cist, (14 December 1921 – 26 August 2015) was an Italian prelate of the Roman Catholic Church. Recchia was born in Sora and ordained a priest on 4 August 1946 from the religious order of Order of Cistercians. Recchia was confirmed Abbot of the Territorial abbey of Claraval on 7 December 1976. Recchia retired as abbot of Claraval on 24 March 1999.

== See also ==
- Order of Cistercians
- Territorial abbey
- Ist. del Prado
