= Jorge Scarso =

Catholic bishop

Jorge Scarso, OFMCap
- Bishop of The Diocese of Patos de Minas (emeritus)
- Church: Roman Catholic Church
- See: The Diocese of Patos de minas
- In office: 1967 - 1992
- Predecessor: José André Coimbra
- Successor: João Bosco Oliver de Faria
- Previous post: Priest

Orders
- Ordination: June 28, 1942

Personal details
- Born: August 13, 1916 Modica, Italy
- Died: October 28, 2015 (aged 99) Modica, Italy

Jorge Scarso, OFMCap (August 13, 1916 – October 28, 2015) was the Italian-born Brazilian bishop of the Roman Catholic Church.

Scarso was born in Modica, Italy, in the summer of 1916. He was ordained priest on June 28, 1942 for the Capuchin Order and appointed the Auxiliary bishop of the Diocese of Patos de Minas as well as Titular bishop of Gemellae in Numidia on November 29, 1967. He was consecrated on March 25, 1968 and was later appointed bishop of the Diocese of Patos de Minas, where he remained until his retirement on January 8, 1992.
