= Nauro Machado =

Brazilian poet and writer (1935–2015)

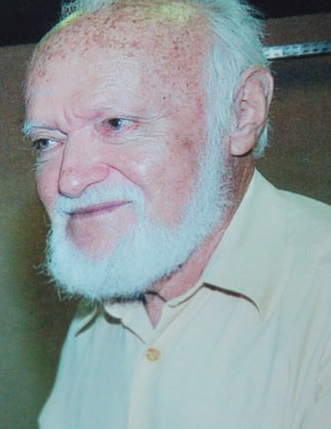
- A portrait of Nauro Machado
- Born: 2 August 1935; Brazil
- Died: 28 November 2015 (aged 80); São Luís, Brazil
- Resting place: Cemitério do Gavião, São Luís, Brazil
- Notable awards: Brazilian Academy of Letters; Brazilian Union of Writers; Doutor Honoris Causa

Nauro Diniz Machado (2 August 1935 – 28 November 2015) was a Brazilian poet and writer. Machado was the son of Torquato Rodrigues Machado and Maria de Lourdes Machado Diniz. He was also married to writer Arlette Nogueira da Cruz. He had vast knowledge in the arts and philosophy while teaching himself in those areas. Compared by some critics to Fernando Pessoa, he is unique because he is a universal poet, a lot like his immediate contemporaries Ferreira Gullar, Lago Burnett, José Chagas, and Bandeira Tribuzi. Machado questioned the very essence and destination of human beings while cultivating a poetic language. His work has anguished and violent existential reflection traits that find few comparisons in the Portuguese language. He held several positions in public court between them DETRAN and EMATER and also the Secretary of the State of Maranhão Culture. Nauru Machado has lived in São Luís, leaving only for brief periods, but mostly for Rio de Janeiro to publish most of his works. However, he dedicated much of his life to his great passion, poetry. Has received numerous awards, among them the Brazilian Academy of Letters and the Brazilian Union of Writers. He had several of his works translated into German, French, and English.

In November 2014, he published a book: "Esôfago Terminal", which talks about pain and his fight against cancer. In October 2015, he received the title of "Doutor Honoris Causa", awarded by the Rector of the Universidade Federal do Maranhão. In November 2015, he released what would be his last book: "O baldio som de Deus." At the time, he had revealed five books that were not published yet. Machado died at the age of 80 due to ischemia in the digestive tract and was buried in the Cemitério do Gavião, in Madre Deus neighborhood in São Luís.
