= Içami Tiba =

Brazilian psychiatrist and writer

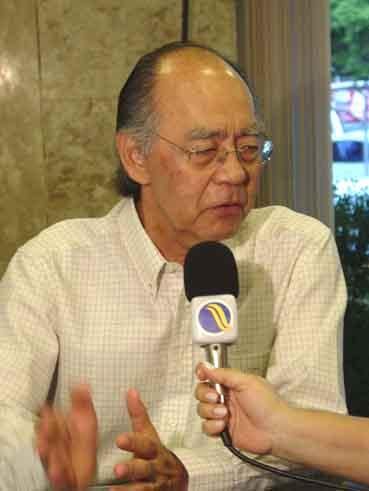

Personal details
- Born: March 15, 1941 Tapiraí, Brazil
- Died: August 2, 2015 (aged 74) São Paulo, Brazil
- Occupation: Psychiatrist, author

Içami Tiba (March 15, 1941 – August 2, 2015) was a Brazilian psychiatrist and writer. Tiba was known for writing his book Quem ama, Educa!. He was born in Tapiraí, Brazil.

Tiba died in São Paulo, Brazil, aged 74.
