= Diocese of Patos de Minas =

Catholic ecclesiastical territory

Diocese of Patos de Minas Dioecesis Patensis

Catholic
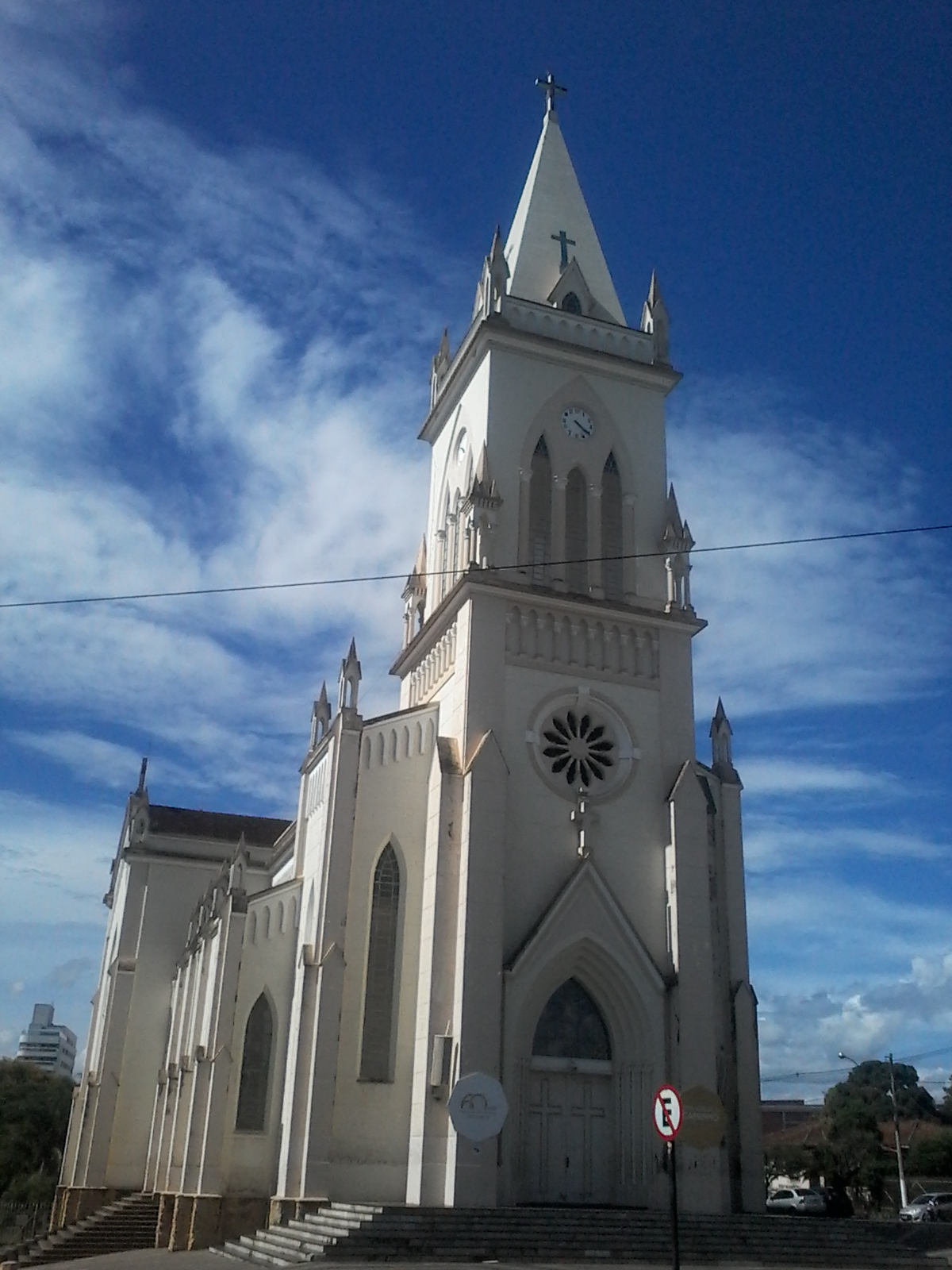
- Catedral Santo Antônio de Pádua in 2015

Location
- Country: Brazil
- Ecclesiastical province: Uberaba

Statistics
- Area: 33,068 km^{2} (12,768 sq mi)
- Population: Total; Catholics: (as of 2004); 529,162; 393,735 (74.4%)

Information
- Rite: Latin Rite
- Established: 5 April 1955 (71 years ago)
- Cathedral: Catedral Santo Antônio de Pádua

Current leadership
- Pope: Leo XIV
- Bishop: Cláudio Nori Sturm, OFMCap
- Metropolitan Archbishop: Paulo Mendes Peixoto

Website
- www.diocesedepatosdeminas.org.br

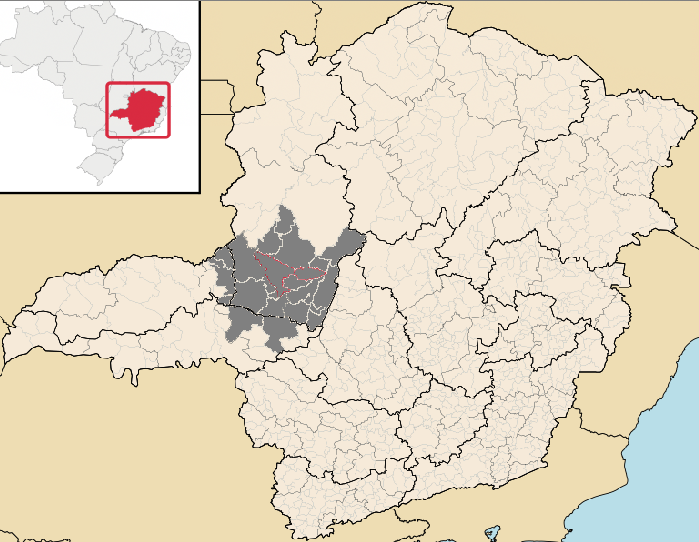
Map of the diocese.

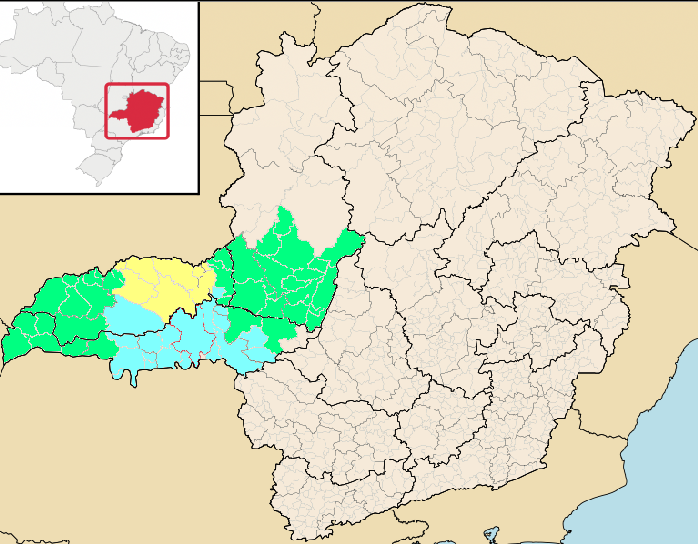
Ecclesiastical Province of Uberaba.

The Roman Catholic Diocese of Patos de Minas (Latin: Dioecesis Patensis) is a diocese located in the city of Patos de Minas in the ecclesiastical province of Uberaba in Brazil. The episcopal see is the Saint Antony Cathedral, located in Patos de Minas

== History ==
- 5 April 1955: Established as Diocese of Patos de Minas from the Diocese of Uberaba

== Bishops ==
- Bishops of Patos de Minas (Roman rite)
  - Bishop José André Coimbra (1955.06.08 – 1968.08.16)
  - Bishop Jorge Scarso, OFMCap (1968.12.28 – 1992.01.08)
  - Bishop João Bosco Oliver de Faria (1992.01.08 – 2007.05.30), appointed Archbishop of Diamantina, Minas Gerais
  - Bishop Cláudio Nori Sturm, OFMCap (2008.10.08 - present)

=== Coadjutor bishop ===
- José Belvino do Nascimento (1987-1989), did not succeed to see; appointed Bishop of Divinópolis, Minas Gerais

=== Auxiliary bishop ===
- Jorge Scarso, OFMCap (1967-1968), appointed Bishop here

=== Other priests of this diocese who became bishops ===
- Paulo Sérgio Machado, appointed Bishop of Ituiutaba, Minas Gerais in 1989
- José Moreira de Melo, appointed Bishop of Itapeva, Sao PauloPriest in 1996
