= Pedro Eugênio =

Brazilian politician

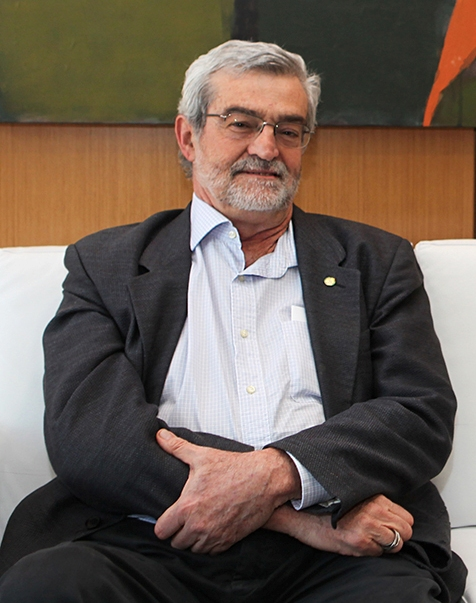
Pedro Eugênio

Pedro Eugênio de Castro Toledo Cabral (29 March 1949 – 20 April 2015) was a Brazilian politician and professor who served as federal deputy representing the Worker's Party from 1998 to 2014.
