= Second inauguration of Dilma Rousseff =

2015 Presidential Inauguration of Dilma Rousseff
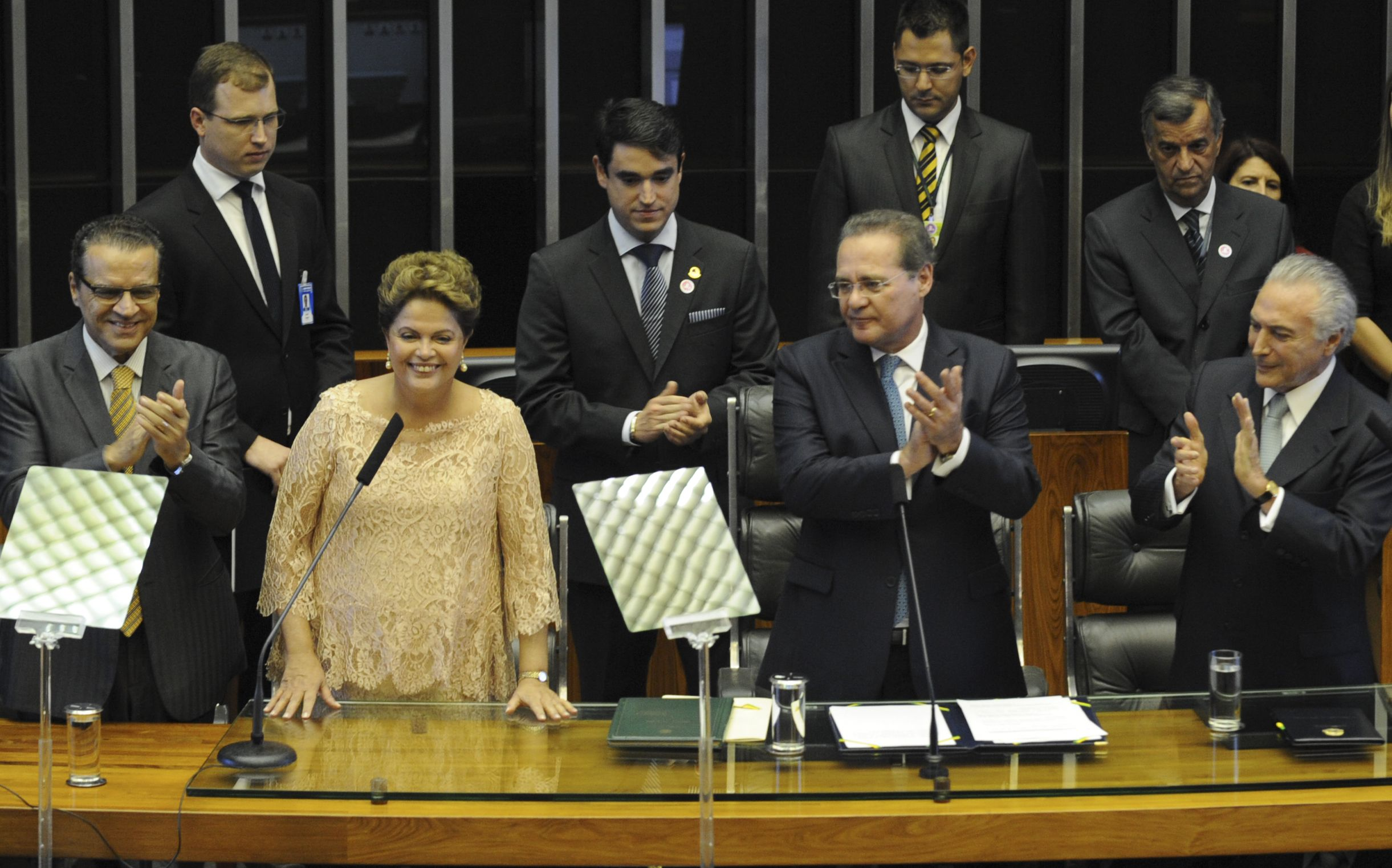
- Dilma Rousseff takes the oath of office of the president of Brazil.
- Date: 1 January 2015; 11 years ago
- Time: 3:00 pm (BRST)
- Location: National Congress of Brazil Brasília, DF
- Participants: Dilma Rousseff; 36th president of Brazil — Assuming office Michel Temer; 24th vice president of Brazil — Assuming office Renan Calheiros; President of the Federal Senate — Administering oath

The second inauguration of Dilma Rousseff as President of Brazil took place on Thursday, 1 January 2015. She was sworn in again with Vice President Michel Temer. The ceremony began at 3 pm (BDT) at the Ulysses Guimarães plenary chamber in Brasília, and was administered by the president of the Federal Senate, Renan Calheiros. Just like the first inauguration, the re-elect President and Vice President read and signed the oathes of office and the national anthem was played by the Marine Corps band.

== Backgrounds ==
On 5 October 2014 took place the first round of the 2014 Brazilian presidential election. None of the candidates reached more than 50% of the valid votes, so a second round took place 4 weeks later, on 26 October, resulting in the reelection of Dilma Rousseff, of the Workers' Party (PT), ahead of Senator Aécio Neves, of the Brazilian Social Democracy Party (PSDB).

The victory was too tight, being the fiercest presidential dispute in history. The presidential campaign was marked by many riots and controversies, specially due to Operation Car Wash, that brought up a huge corruption scheme that hits parties and the political class. Car Wash was part of a wider political and economic crisis, that began to get worse.

== Coverage ==
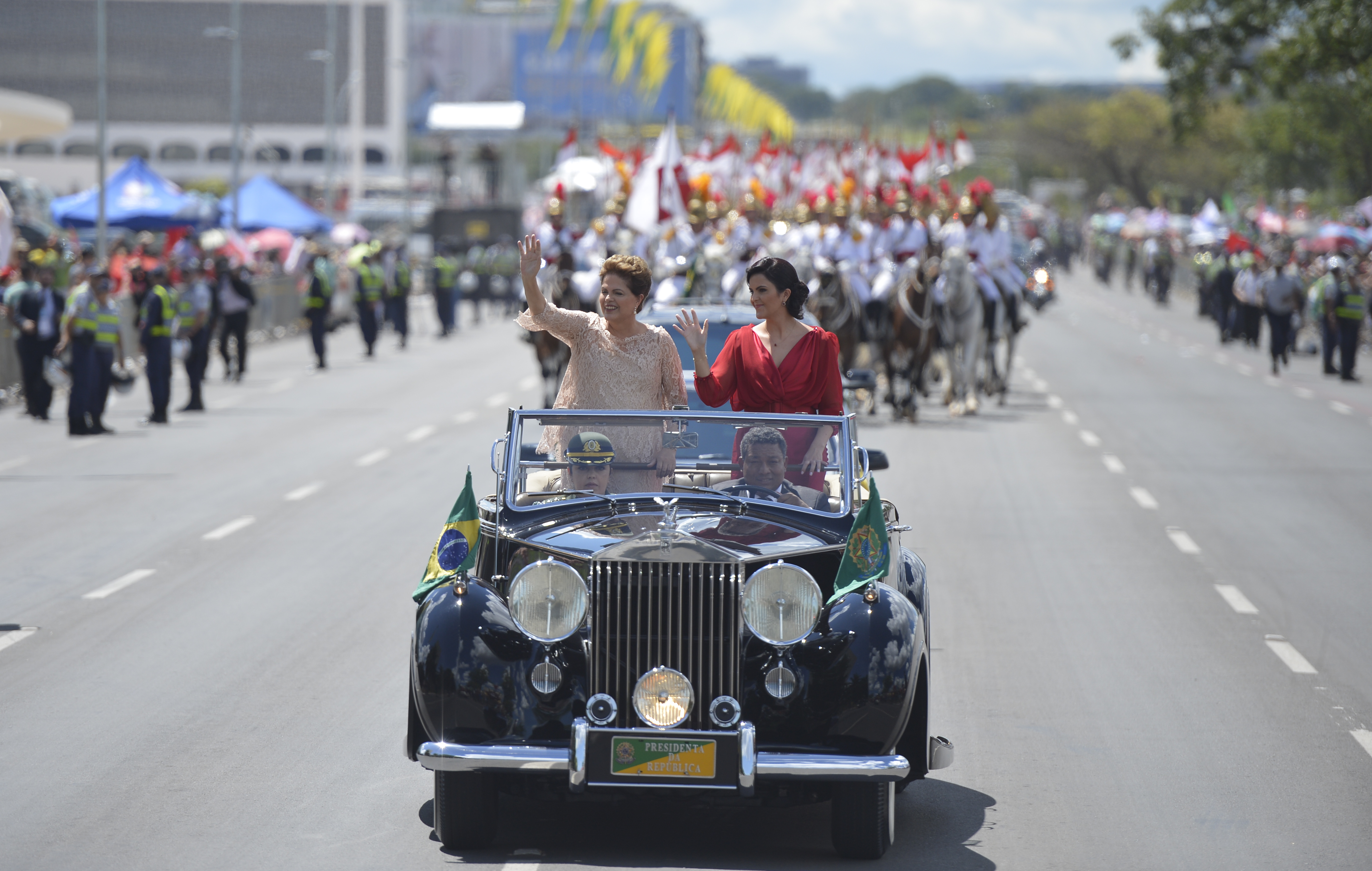
Dilma during open car parade between the Cathedral of Brasília and the National Congress along with her daughter, Paula Rousseff.

The inauguration of Dilma Rousseff began at 3 pm, with a parade in a Rolls-Royce Silver Wraith. Vice President Michel Temer followed Dilma and Paula behind them, along with his wife, Marcela Temer. Unlike her first inauguration, when she paraded in a closed car due to bad weather, Dilma paraded in an open car, waving for the public, accompanied by her daughter Paula Rousseff and the guard of the Planalto Palace (the Independence Dragons), motorcyclists of the Military Police and other security agents. It was the third time a president used the Rolls-Royce two times in a row after being sworn in, as occurred in the inaugurations of former presidents Fernando Henrique Cardoso (1995 and 1999) and Luiz Inácio Lula da Silva (2003 and 2007),

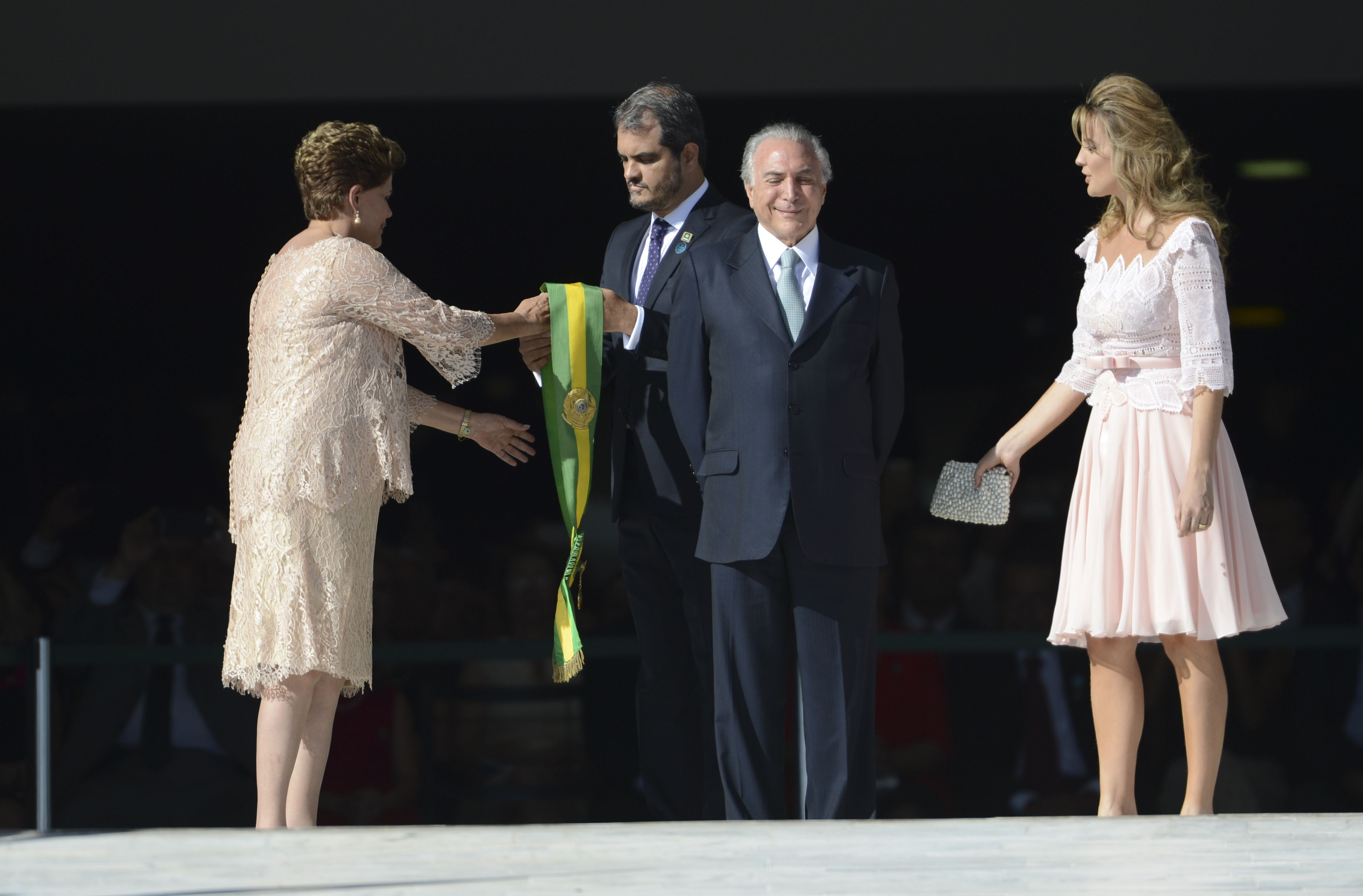
Dilma Rousseff receiving the presidential sash, along with Vice President Michel Temer and Second Lady Marcela Temer.

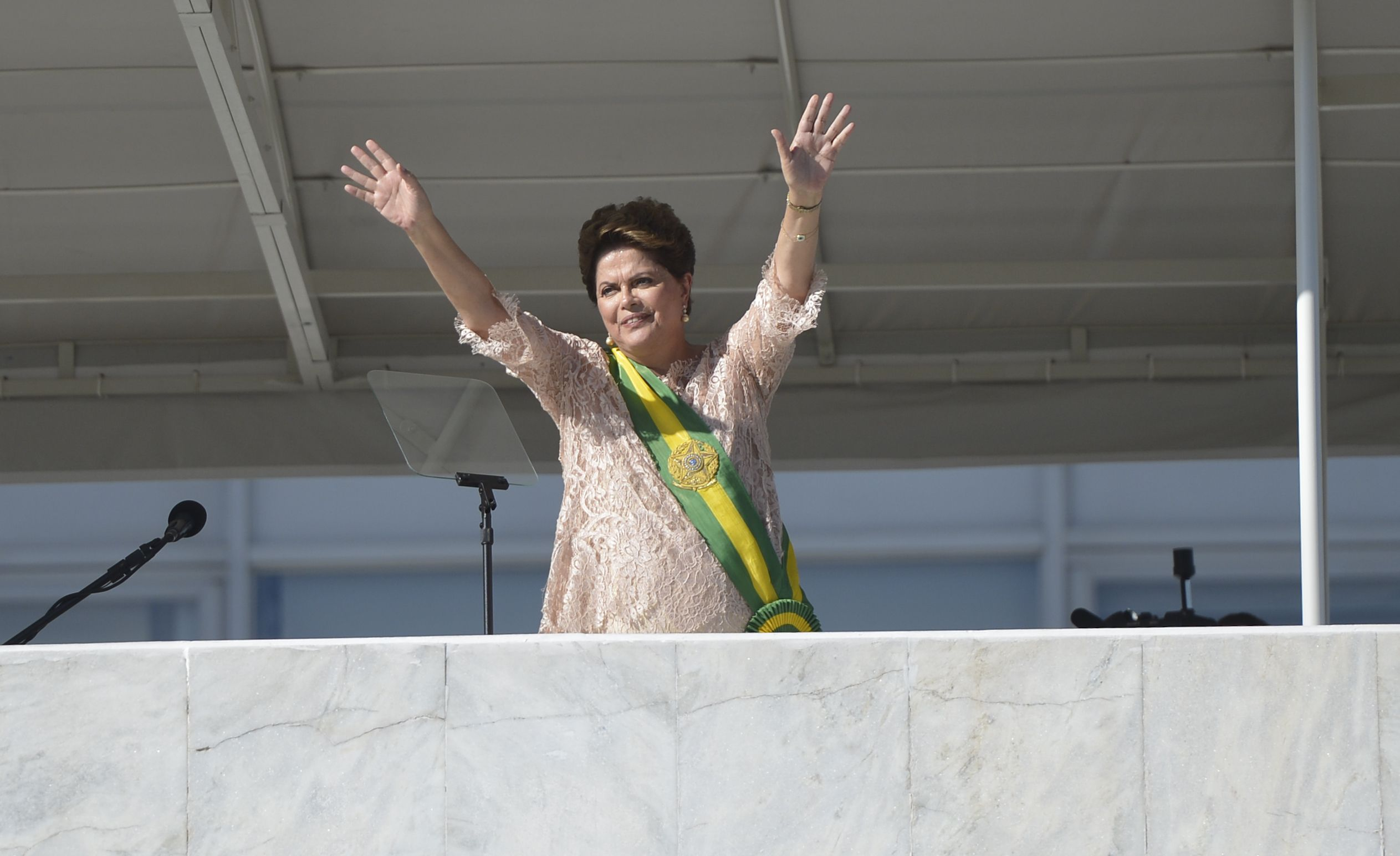
Dilma waving to the public during her speech at the Planalto Palace parlatorium.

After stepping out of the Rolls-Royce, Dilma was received and greeted by Vice President Michel Temer and Second Lady Marcela Temer and by the presidents of the Chamber and Senate, Henrique Eduardo Alves and Renan Calheiros, respectively, and by the president of the Supreme Federal Court, Ricardo Lewandowski and his wife Yara Lewandowski.

After that, heading to the Director's Board of the Congress, Dilma was also greeted by congressists from parties that compose her allied base in Congress. At the main board, the president of the Congress, Renan Calheiros, opens the joint session to inaugurate Rousseff and Temer, and both read the oath of office before the Congress: "I promise to preserve, defend and uphold the Constitution, observe the Laws, promote the general welfare of the Brazilian people, sustain the union, the integrity and the independence of Brazil". After the reading, President and Vice President both signed the recordings book and the Brazilian National Anthem was played by the Brazilian Marine Corps band.

Following the inauguration ceremony, Dilma begins her inauguration speech after the anthem, that lasted more than 40 minutes. During her speech, the president listed the positive points of her first term, among them the leaving of Brazil of the United Nations Hunger Map, and the priorities of her second term, specially education, announcing the new government motto, "Brazil, educator homeland", and also measures to retain the high inflation and the resume of the economic growth of the country. With the end of her speech, Renan Calheiros finished the joint session.

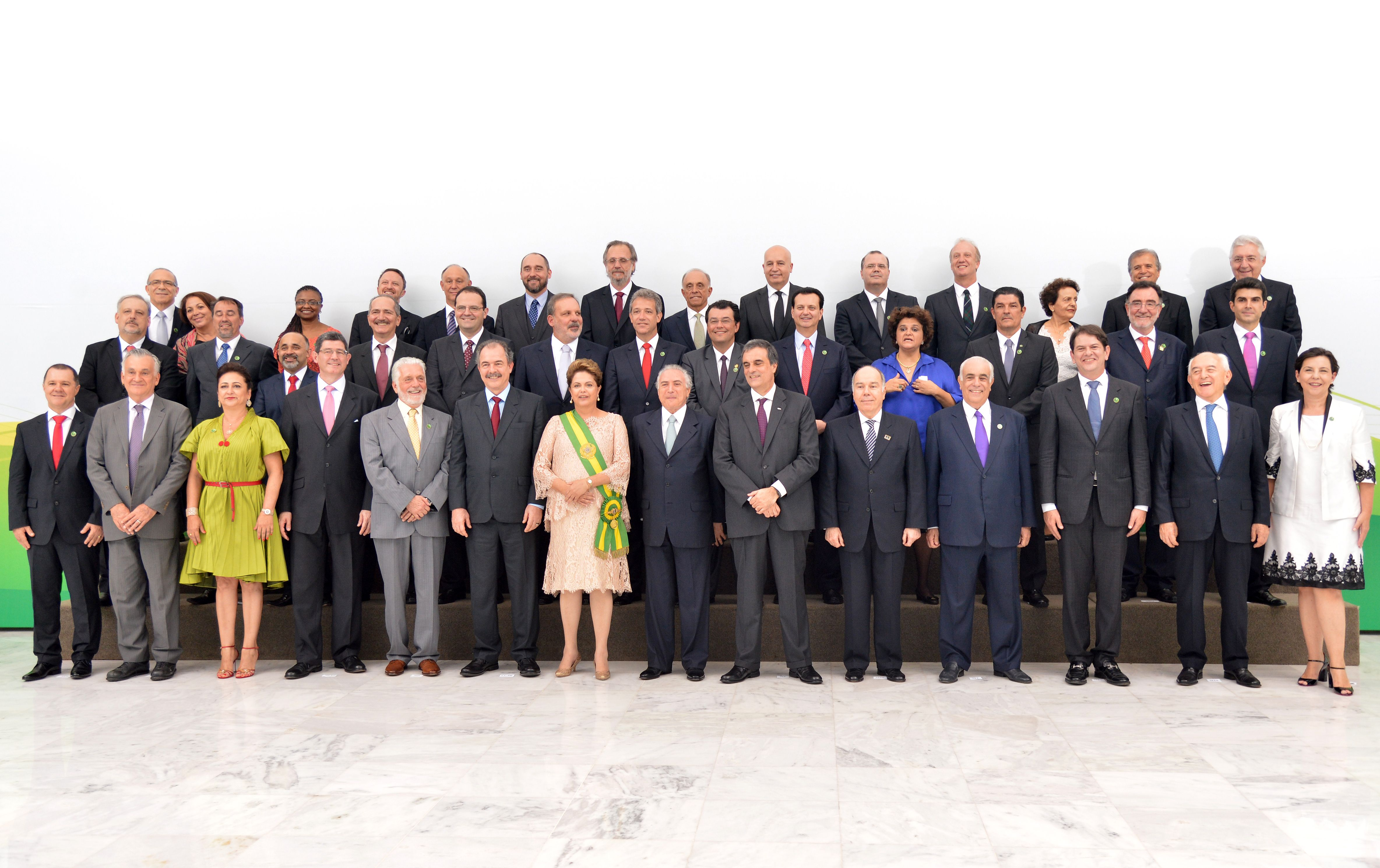
Dilma with Michel Temer and her second term minister on 1 January 2015.

Leaving the Congress, the president reviews the Brazilian Armed Forces troops and a 21-gun salute is fired by the Cayenne Battery. The National Anthem is played a second time. After that, she enters the Rolls-Royce again, while the Smoke Squadron flies over the Monumental Axis, towards the Planalto Palace, where she climbs the ramp, receiving the presidential sash and giving another speech for the present public at the parlatorium. As during the initial parade, Dilma was greeted by the present ones. After her speech, she followed with her ministerial group to the Noble Hall of the Palace, where they were sworn in and posed for the official photo. After that, Rousseff received the greetings from heads of State and foreign envoys.

Finishing her schedule of the inauguration, President Dilma headed to Itamaraty Palace, headquarters of the Ministry of Foreign Affairs, where she met with vice president of the United States, Joe Biden, and with the UNESCO director-general, Irina Bokova, and participated in a reception with more than 3,000 guests.

== Presence of foreign leaders ==
At Dilma's inauguration, many heads of State and foreign envoys were presented and were greeted by the president after her speech at the Planalto Palace. Among the foreign authorities were:

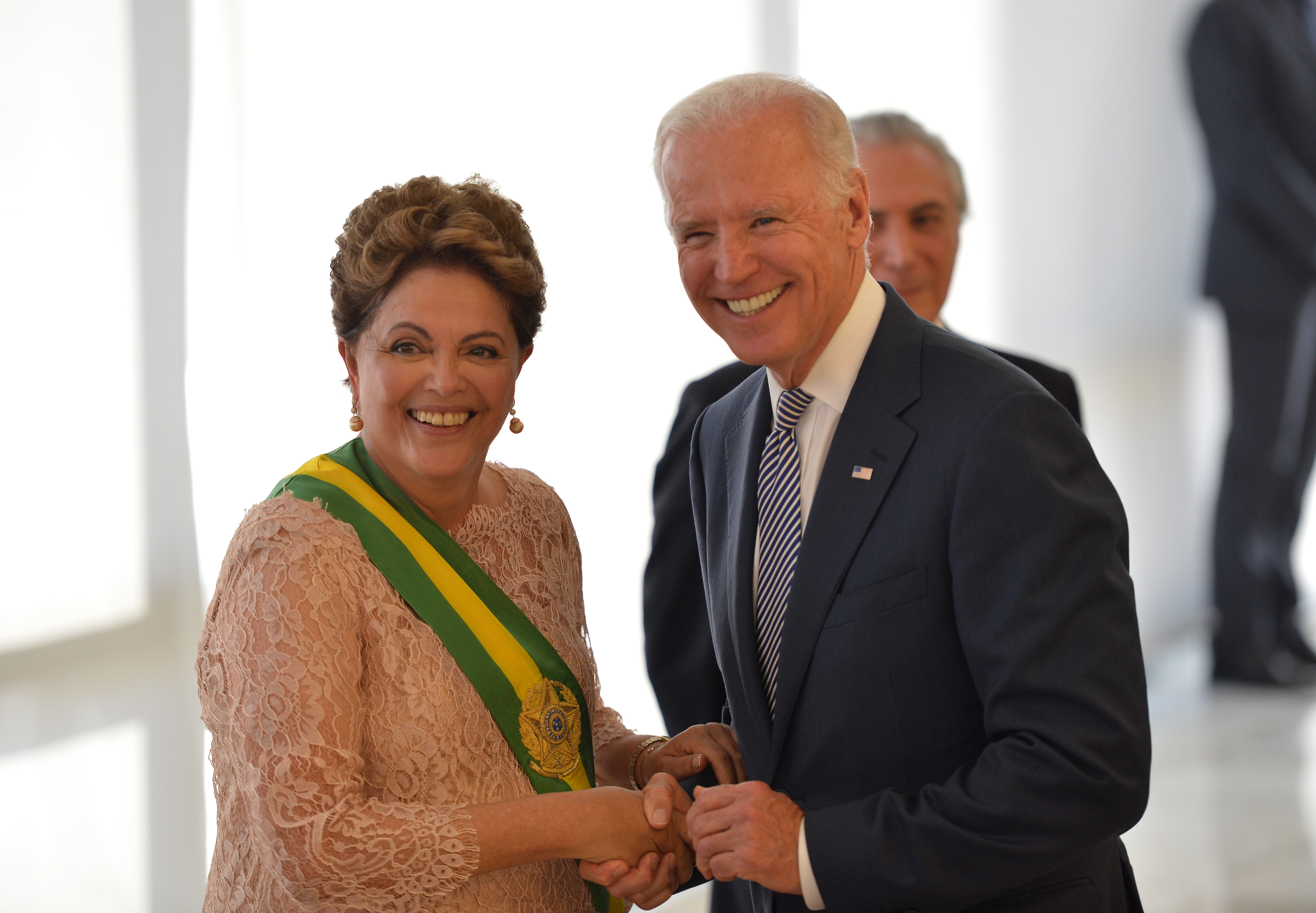
President Dilma Rousseff is greeted by the Vice President of the United States, Joe Biden.

- Angola – Vice President Manuel Domingos Vicente
- Argentina – Vice President Amado Boudou
- Bolivia – President Evo Morales
- Chile – President Michelle Bachelet
- China – Vice President Li Yuanchao
- Colombia – Vice President Germán Vargas Lleras
- Costa Rica – President Luis Guillermo Solís
- Cuba – Former Vice President José Ramón Machado
- Curaçao – Prime Minister Ivar Asjes
- Equatorial Guinea – Prime Minister Vicente Ehate Tomi
- Ghana – President John Dramani Mahama
- Guinea Bissau – President José Mário Vaz
- Morocco – Prime Minister Abdelilah Benkirane
- Paraguay – President Horacio Cartes
- Peru – Vice President Marisol Espinoza
- Portugal – Deputy Prime Minister Paulo Portas
- Russia – Senator Alexander Torshin
- Sweden – Prime Minister Stefan Löfven
- United States – Vice President Joe Biden
- Uruguay – President José Mujica
- Uruguay – President-elect Tabaré Vázquez

== See also ==
- First inauguration of Dilma Rousseff
- Presidency of Dilma Rousseff
