= Modern history of Ukraine =

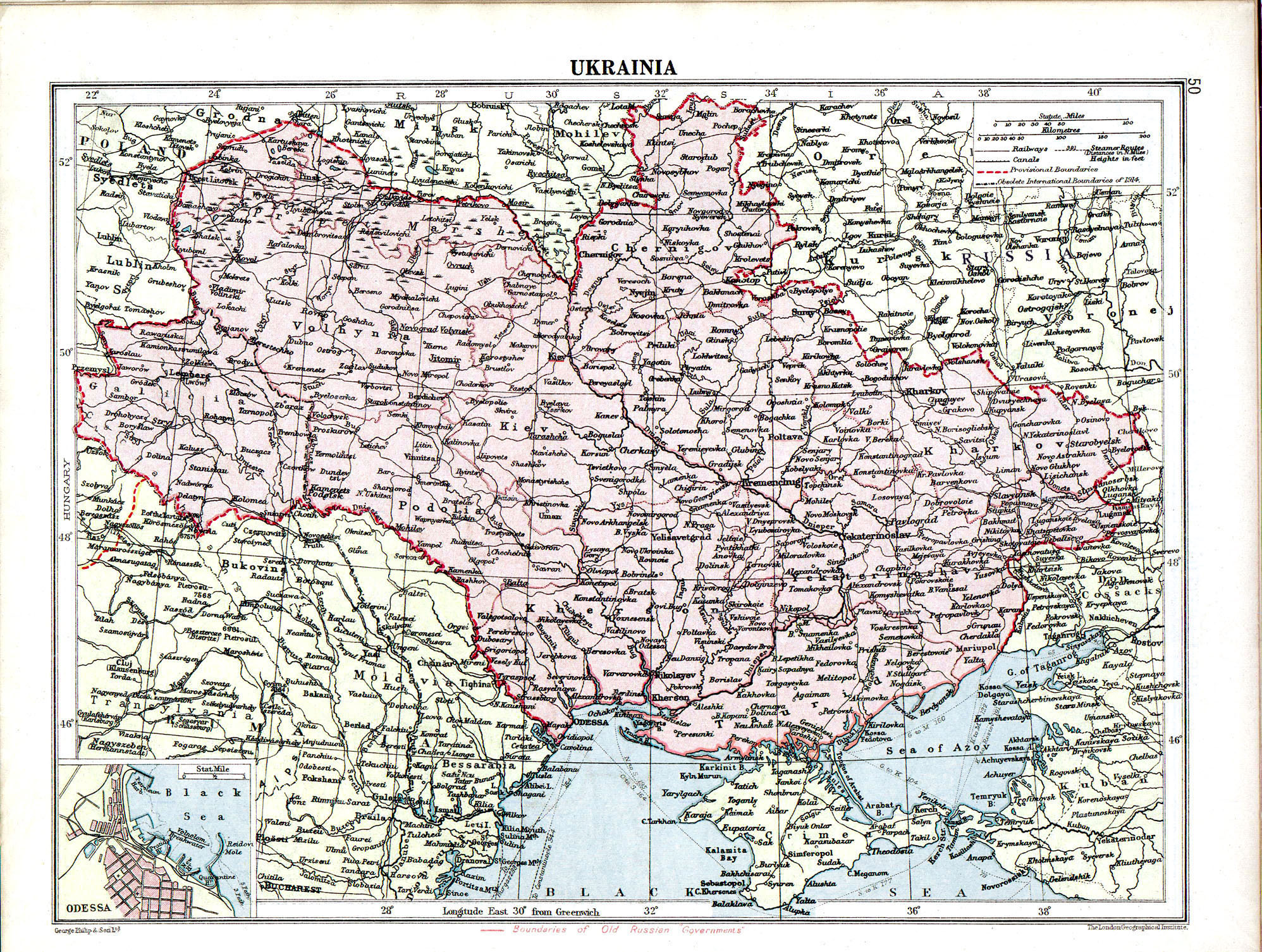
Ukrainian People's Republic (pink) 1918-20

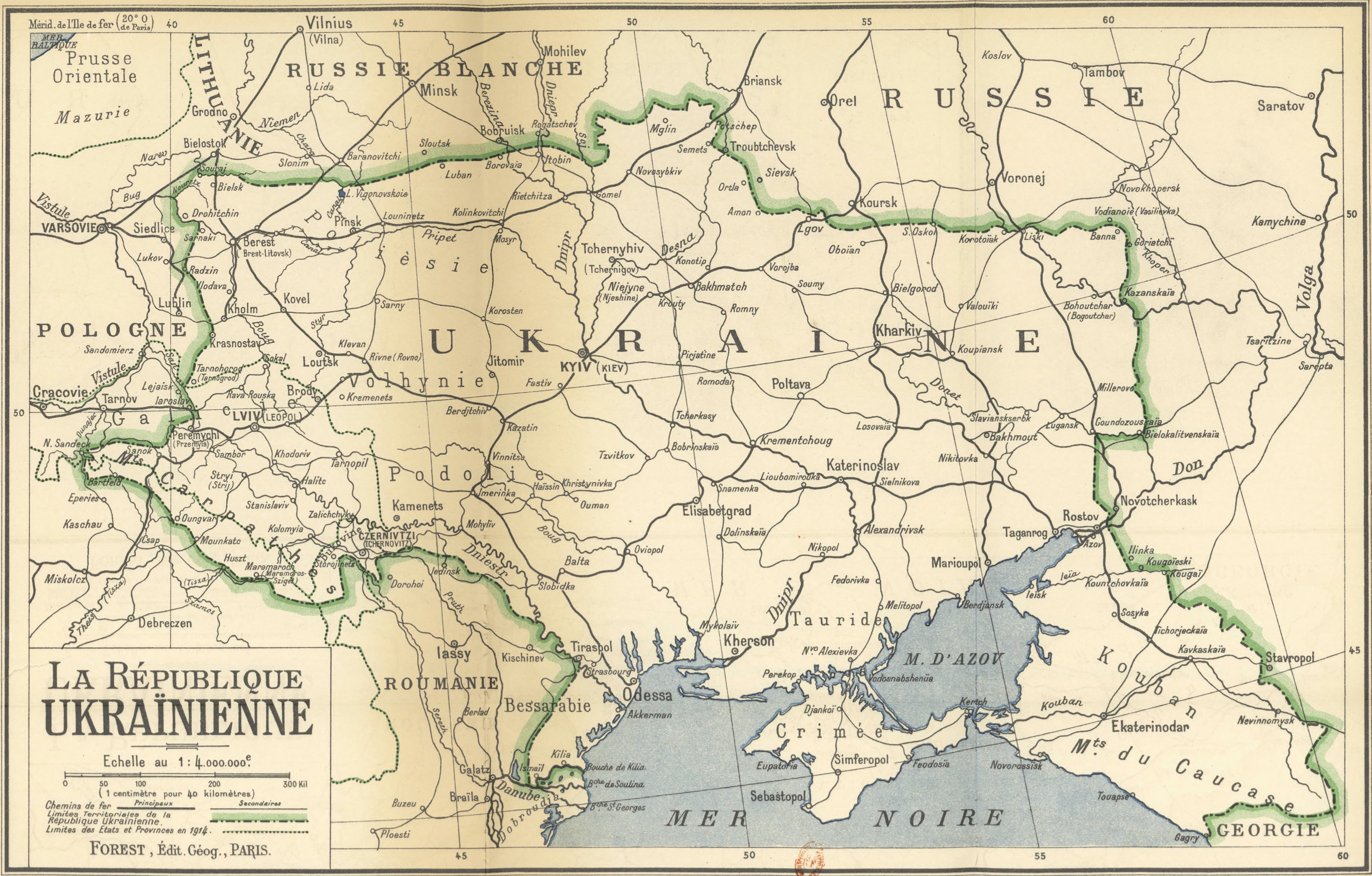
Ukraine's borders claimed by the Ukrainian People's Republic delegation at the Paris Peace Conference in 1919–20.

Ukraine emerged as the concept of a nation, and Ukrainians as a nationality, with the Ukrainian National Revival which began in the late 18th and early 19th century. The first wave of national revival is traditionally connected with the publication of the first part of "Eneyida" by Ivan Kotlyarevsky (1798). In 1846, in Moscow the "Istoriya Rusov ili Maloi Rossii" (History of Ruthenians or Little Russia) was published. During the Spring of Nations, in 1848 in Lemberg (Lviv) the Supreme Ruthenian Council was created which declared that Galician Ruthenians were part of the bigger Ukrainian nation. The council adopted the yellow and blue flag, the current Ukrainian flag.

Ukraine first declared its independence with the invasion of Bolsheviks in late 1917. Following the conclusion of World War I and with the Peace of Riga, Ukraine was partitioned once again between Poland and the Bolshevik Russia. The Bolshevik-occupied portion of the territory became the Ukrainian Soviet Socialist Republic, with some boundary adjustments.

In 1922, the Ukrainian Soviet Socialist Republic, together with the Russian Soviet Federative Socialist Republic, the Byelorussian Soviet Socialist Republic and the Transcaucasian Socialist Federative Soviet Republic, became the founding members of the Soviet Union. The Soviet famine of 1932–33 or Holodomor killed an estimated 6 to 8 million people in the Soviet Union, the majority of them in Ukraine.

In 1941, the Soviet Union was invaded by Germany and its other allies. Many Ukrainians initially regarded the Wehrmacht soldiers as liberators from Soviet rule, while others formed an anti-German partisan movement. Some elements of the Ukrainian nationalist underground formed a Ukrainian Insurgent Army that fought both Soviet and Nazi forces. In 1945, Ukraine was made one of the founding members of the United Nations even though it was part of the Soviet Union. In 1954 the Crimean Oblast was transferred from the RSFSR to the Ukrainian SSR.

After the dissolution of the Soviet Union in 1991, Ukraine became an independent state, formalized with a referendum. With the enlargement of the European Union in 2004, Ukraine became an area of overlapping spheres of influence between the European Union and the Russian Federation in the post-Soviet era. This manifested in a political division between the "pro-European" Western Ukraine and the "pro-Russian" Eastern Ukraine, which led to an ongoing series of political turmoil, including the Orange Revolution, the Euromaidan protests, the outbreak of the Russo-Ukrainian War in 2014, and the ongoing Russian invasion.

== The 19th century ==
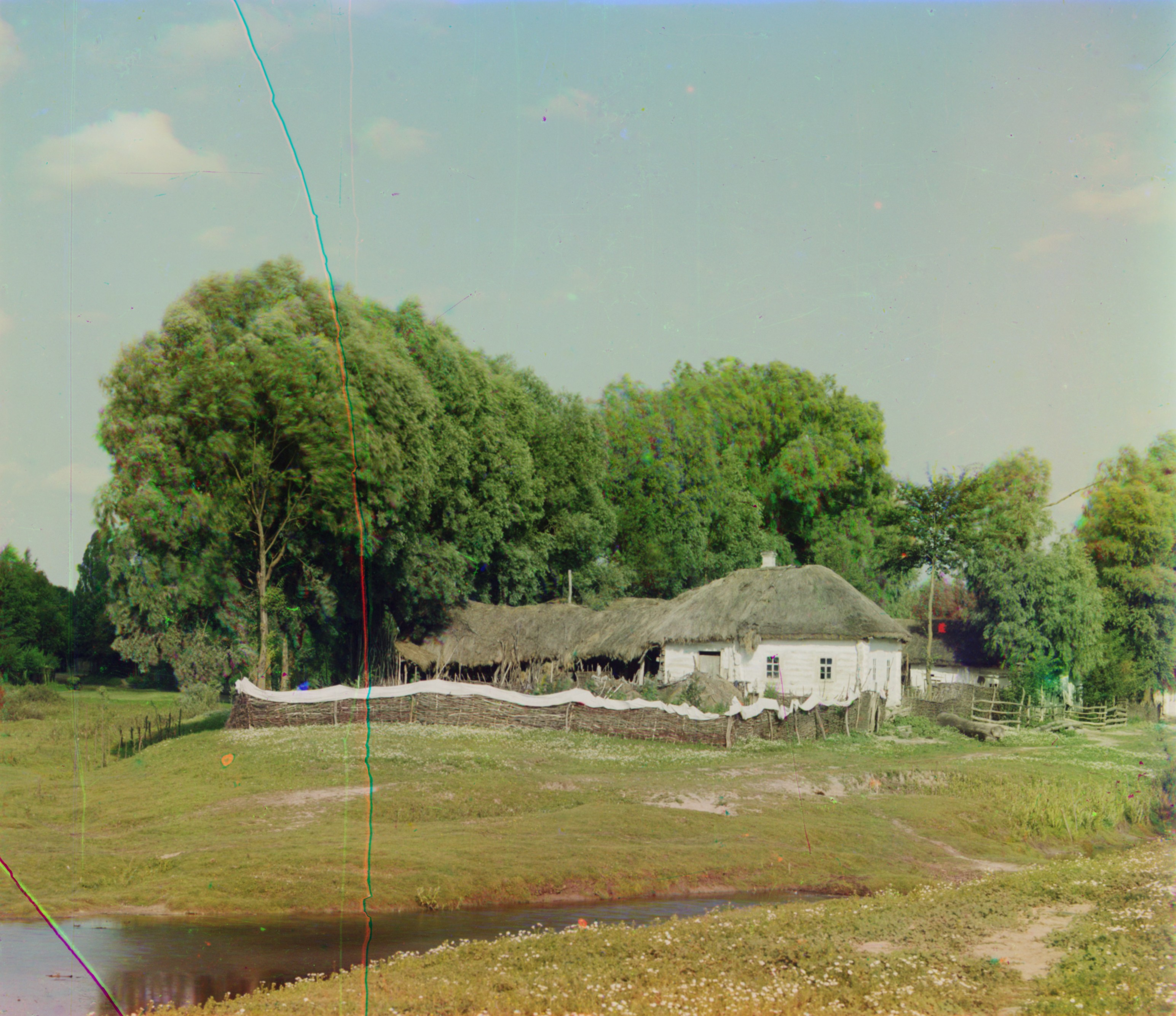
In Little Russia [i.e. Ukraine]. Photo by Sergei Prokudin-Gorskii, between 1905 and 1915.

After the 17th-century failed attempt to regain statehood in the form of the Cossack Hetmanate, the future Ukrainian territory was again divided between three empires: the Russian Empire, the Ottoman Empire, and the Polish–Lithuanian Commonwealth.

In the second half of the 18th century, Catherine the Great instigated hysteria in the local Eastern Orthodox population by promising protection from Catholicism. This led to an armed conflict Koliivshchyna in the neighboring right-bank Ukraine, which was part of the Polish–Lithuanian Commonwealth. It resulted in the Polish Bar Confederation, a Russian invasion of Poland and its internal affairs, and partitions. By the end of the 18th century, most of Ukraine was annexed by Russia. At the same time the Russian Empire gradually gained control over the Black Sea coast (northern Pontic coast) which had been of the Ottoman realm at the conclusion of the Russo-Turkish Wars of 1735–39, 1768–74, 1787–92.

The lands were given to the nobility, and the unfree peasantry were transferred to cultivate the Pontic steppe. Catherine forced out the local Nogai population, resettled the Crimean Greeks, renamed all populated places, and invited European settlers to these newly conquered lands: Poles, Germans (Black Sea Germans, Crimea Germans, Volga Germans), Swiss, and others. Some Estonian Swedes were deported to southern Ukraine. Since then there exists the old Swedish village of Gammalsvenskby–Zmiivka.

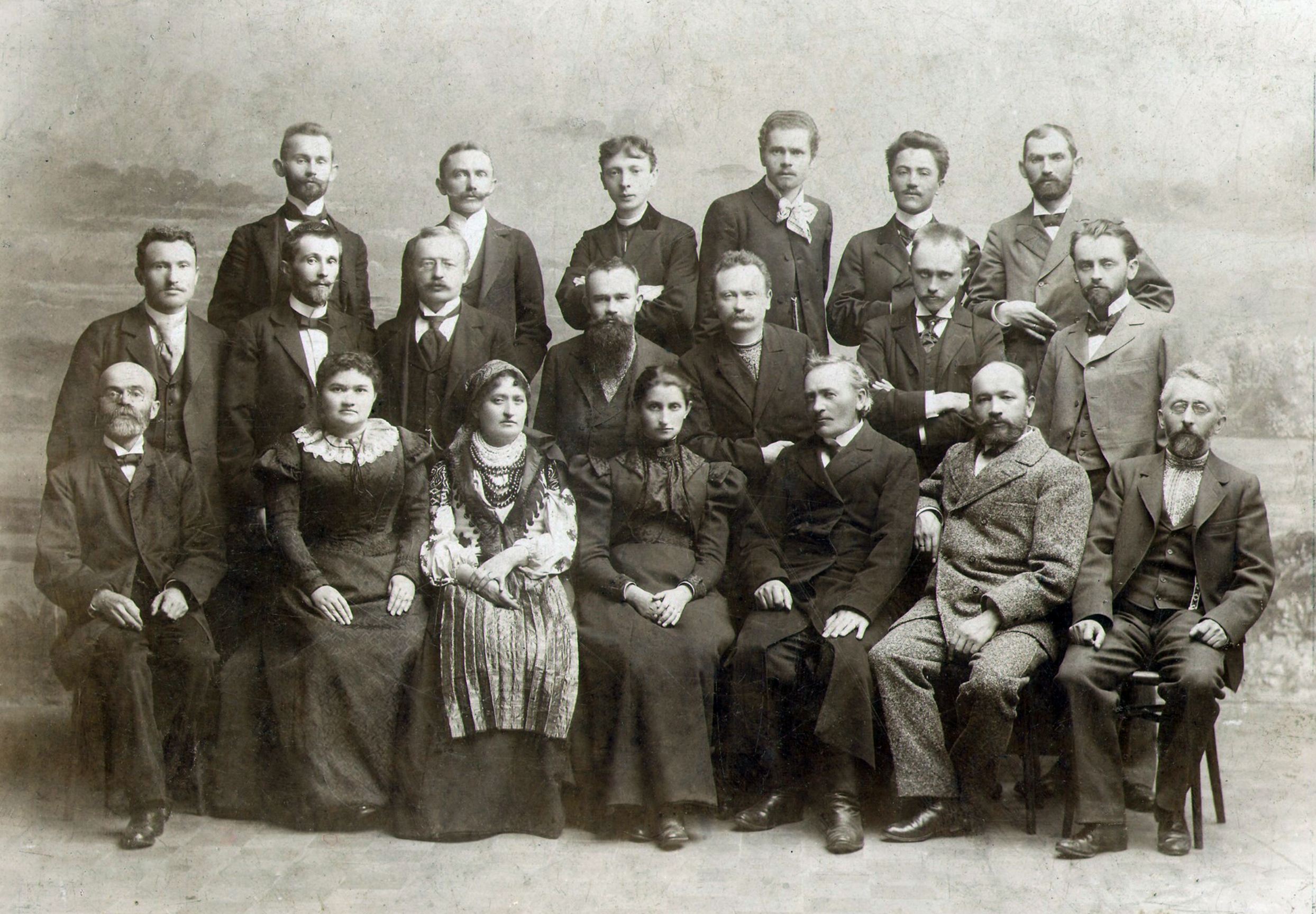
The 1898 congress of Ukrainian writers in Lemberg (Lviv), commemorating the 100th anniversary of publishing "Eneyida"

Ukrainian writers and intellectuals were inspired by the nationalistic spirit stirring other European peoples existing under other imperial governments. Russia, fearing separatism, imposed strict limits on attempts to elevate the Ukrainian language and culture, even banning its use and study. The Russophile policies of Russification and Panslavism led to an exodus of a number some Ukrainian intellectuals into Western Ukraine, while others embraced a Pan-Slavic or Russian identity, with many Russian authors or composers of the 19th century being of Ukrainian origin (notably Nikolai Gogol and Pyotr Ilyich Tchaikovsky).

In the Austrian Empire most of the elite that ruled Galicia were of Austrian or Polish descent, with the Ruthenians mostly representing the peasantry. During the 19th century, Russophilia was a common occurrence among the Slavic population, but the mass exodus of Ukrainian intellectuals escaping from Russian repression in Eastern Ukraine, as well as the intervention of Austrian authorities, caused the movement to be replaced by Ukrainophilia, which would then cross-over into the Russian Empire.

== First World War, the revolutions, and aftermath ==
When World War I and a series of revolutions across Europe, including the October Revolution in Russia, shattered many existing empires such as the Austrian and Russian ones, people of Ukraine were caught in the middle. Between 1917 and 1919, several separate Ukrainian republics manifested independence, the Makhnovshchina, the Ukrainian People's Republic, the Ukrainian State, the West Ukrainian People's Republic, and numerous Bolshevik revkoms.

As the area of Ukraine fell into warfare and chaos, it was also fought over by German and Austrian forces, the Red Army of Bolshevik Russia, the White Forces of General Denikin, the Polish Army, anarchists led by Nestor Makhno. Kyiv itself was occupied by many different armies. The city was captured by the Bolsheviks on 9 February 1918, by the Germans on 2 March 1918, by the Bolsheviks a second time on 5 February 1919, by the White Army on 31 August 1919, by Bolsheviks for a third time on 15 December 1919, by the Polish Army on 6 May 1920, and finally by the Bolsheviks for the fourth time on 12 June 1920.

The defeat in the Polish-Ukrainian War and then the failure of the Piłsudski's and Petliura's Warsaw agreement of 1920 to oust the Bolsheviks during the 1920 Kiev offensive led almost to the occupation of Poland itself. This led to the Polish–Soviet War, which culminated in the signing of the Peace of Riga in March 1921. The Peace of Riga divided the disputed territories between Poland and Soviet Russia. Specifically, the part of Ukraine west of the Zbruch river was incorporated into Poland, while the eastern portion became part of the Soviet Union as the Ukrainian Soviet Socialist Republic. The first capital of the Ukrainian Soviet Socialist Republic was Kharkiv; in 1934, the capital was relocated to Kyiv.

== Interbellum ==
=== Soviet Ukraine ===
Flag of Soviet Ukraine (prohibited under Ukrainian law)

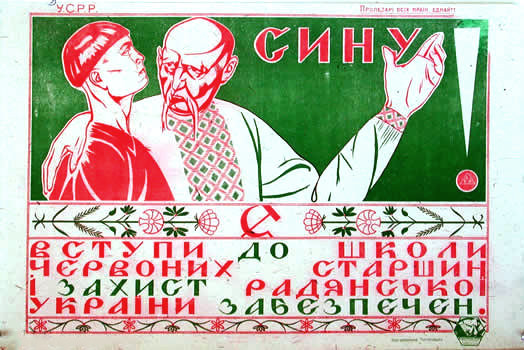
The Ukrainianization program aimed at fostering Ukrainian ethnic identity among the population of Ukraine. This 1921 recruitment poster uses Ukrainian orthography to convey its message, "Son, join the School of Red Commanders, and the defense of Soviet Ukraine will be ensured".

The Ukrainian national idea lived on during the inter-war years and was even spread to a large territory with the traditionally mixed population in the east and south that became part of the Ukrainian Soviet republic. The Ukrainian culture even enjoyed a revival due to Bolshevik concessions in the early Soviet years (until the early-1930s) known as the policy of Korenization ("indigenization"). In these years, an impressive Ukrainization program was implemented throughout the republic. Alongside this a number of national territorial units were set aside for non-Ukrainian ethnic groups. As well as an autonomous republic in the west for Ukraine's Moldovan people several national raions including 8 Russian, 7 German, 4 Greek, 4 Bulgarian, 3 Jewish, and 1 Polish national raion existed in this period.

The rapidly developed Ukrainian language-based education system dramatically raised the literacy of the Ukrainophone rural population. Simultaneously, the newly literate ethnic Ukrainians migrated to the cities, which became rapidly largely Ukrainianised—in both population and in education. Similarly expansive was an increase in Ukrainian language publishing and overall eruption of Ukrainian cultural life.

At the same time, the usage of Ukrainian was continuously encouraged in the workplace and in government affairs as the recruitment of indigenous cadre was implemented as part of the korenisation policies. While initially, the party and government apparatus was mostly Russian-speaking, by the end of the 1920s the ethnic Ukrainians composed over one half of the membership in the Ukrainian communist party, the number strengthened by the accession of Borotbists, a formerly indigenously Ukrainian "independentist" and non-Bolshevik communist party.

Despite the ongoing Soviet Union-wide antireligious campaign, the Ukrainian national Orthodox church was created called the Ukrainian Autocephalous Orthodox Church (UAOC). The Bolshevik government initially saw the national church as a tool in their goal to suppress the Russian Orthodox Church always viewed with the great suspicion by the regime for its being the cornerstone of pre-revolutionary Russian Empire and the initially strong opposition it took towards the regime change. Therefore, the government tolerated the new Ukrainian national church for some time and the UAOC gained a wide following among the Ukrainian peasantry.

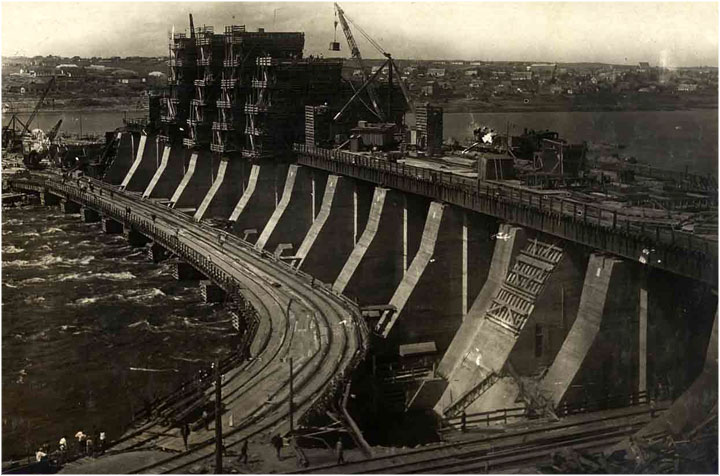
A 1934 photo of the DnieproGES hydropower plant, a heavyweight of Soviet industrialization in Ukraine.

The change in the Soviet economic policies towards the fast-pace industrialization was marked by the 1928 introduction of Joseph Stalin's first piatiletka (a five-year plan). Industrialization brought about a dramatic economic and social transformation in traditionally agricultural Ukraine. In the first piatiletkas the industrial output of Ukraine quadrupled as the republic underwent a record industrial development. The massive influx of the rural population to the industrial centers increased the urban population from 19% to 34%.

==== Soviet collectivisation ====
However, industrialization had a heavy cost for the peasantry, demographically a backbone of the Ukrainian nation. To satisfy the state's need for increased food supplies and finance industrialization, Stalin instituted a program of collectivization of agriculture, which profoundly affected Ukraine, often referred to as the "breadbasket of the USSR". In the late 1920s and early 1930s, the state combined the peasants' lands and animals into collective farms. Starting in 1929, a policy of enforcement was applied, using regular troops and secret police to confiscate lands and materials where necessary.

Many resisted, and a desperate struggle by the peasantry against the authorities ensued. Some slaughtered their livestock rather than turn it over to the collectives. Wealthier peasants were labeled "kulaks", enemies of the state. Tens of thousands were executed and about 100,000 families were deported to Siberia and Kazakhstan.

Forced collectivization had a devastating effect on agricultural productivity. Despite this, in 1932 the Soviet government increased Ukraine's production quotas by 44%, ensuring that they could not be met. Soviet law required that the members of a collective farm would receive no grain until government quotas were satisfied. The authorities in many instances exacted such high levels of procurement from collective farms that starvation became widespread.

Starved peasants on a street in Kharkiv, 1933.

The Soviet famine of 1932–33, called Holodomor in Ukrainian, claimed up to 10 million Ukrainian lives as peasants' food stocks were forcibly removed by Stalin's regime by the NKVD secret police. As elsewhere, the precise number of deaths by starvation in Ukraine may never be precisely known. That said, the most recent demographic studies suggest that over 4 million Ukrainians perished in the first six months of 1933 alone, a figure that increases if population losses from 1931, 1932, and 1934 are also included, along with those from adjacent territories inhabited primarily by Ukrainians (but politically part of the Russian Federated Soviet Socialist Republic), such as the Kuban.

The Soviet Union suppressed information about this genocide, and as late as the 1980s admitted only that there was some hardship because of kulak sabotage and bad weather. Non-Soviets maintain that the famine was an avoidable, deliberate act of genocide.

The times of industrialization and collectivization also brought about a wide campaign against "nationalist deviation" which in Ukraine translated into an assault on the national political and cultural elite. The first wave of purges between 1929 and 1934 targeted the revolutionary generation of the party that in Ukraine included many supporters of Ukrainization. The next 1936–1938 wave of political purges eliminated much of the new political generation that replaced those that perished in the first wave and halved the membership of the Ukrainian communist party.

The purged Ukrainian political leadership was largely replaced by the cadre sent from Russia that was also largely "rotated" by Stalin's purges. As the policies of Ukrainisation were halted (1931) and replaced by massive Russification approximately four-fifths of the Ukrainian cultural elite, intellectuals, writers, artists, and clergy, had been "eliminated", executed or imprisoned, in the following decade. Mass arrests of the hierarchy and clergy of the Ukrainian Autocephalous Orthodox Church culminated in the liquidation of the church in 1930.

==== Galicia and Volhynia under Polish rule ====
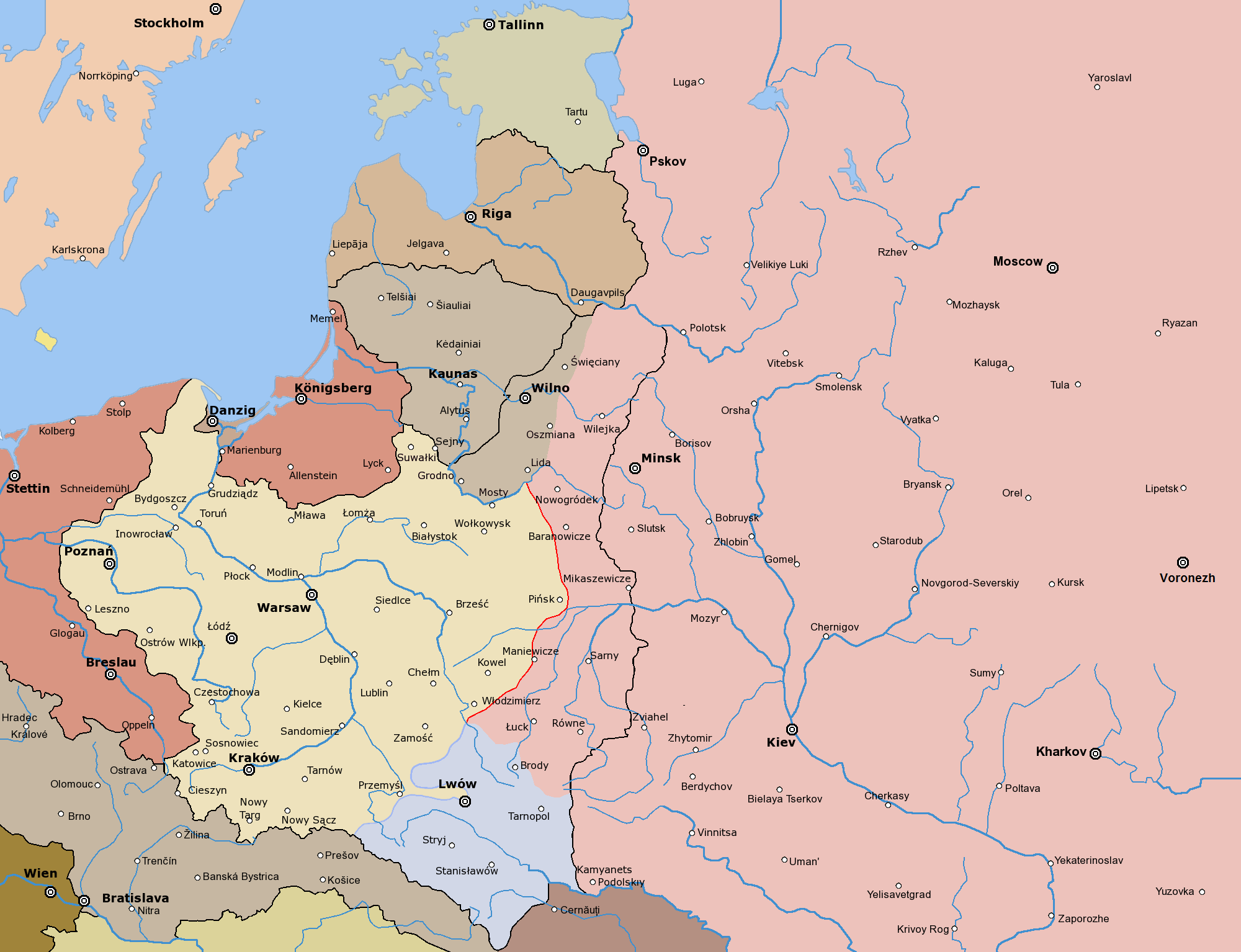
The breaking of the siege of Lviv by Poles (November 1919) and the Polish border at the Zbruch River by the war's end, with eastern Galicia (shown in blue) under the Polish control.

Following the end of World War I, the eastern part of the former Austrian province of Galicia, as well as Volhynia, which had belonged to the Russian Empire, became the area of a Polish-Ukrainian War. The Ukrainians claimed these lands because they made up the majority of the population there (except for cities, such as Lviv, where Poles and Jews numerically dominated), while the Poles saw these provinces as Eastern Borderlands, a historical part of their country. The war was won by the Poles, and their rule over these disputed lands was cemented after another Polish victory, in the Polish-Soviet War. Although some Ukrainian political parties, such as the Ukrainian National Democratic Alliance, sought a settlement with Poles within the existing geopolitical order, their hopes for gaining at least autonomy were quickly dashed. Most Poles considered the borderlands to be indigenously Polish, and Ukrainians could be at best tolerated guests there.

In the interbellum period, eastern Galicia was divided into three administrative units — Lwów Voivodeship, Stanisławów Voivodeship, and Tarnopol Voivodeship, while in Volhynia, Wołyń Voivodeship was created. The Ukrainian majority of these lands was treated as second-class citizens by the Polish authorities. The conflict escalated in the 1930s, with terrorist actions of the Organization of Ukrainian Nationalists resulting in increasingly heavy-handed actions by the Polish government, which often affected random representatives of the Ukrainian minority. The tensions were further exacerbated by the arrival of thousands of osadniks, or Polish settlers, who were granted land, especially in Volhynia. Henryk Józewski, a voivode of the Wołyń Voivodeship 1928–1938, tried to defuse the conflict, advocating a self-governance autonomy for Ukrainians in Volhynia; however, he faced growing criticism from some quarters for allegedly being too Ukrainophilic. Finally, in 1938, he was moved to the office of voivode of Łódź Voivodeship, which had essentially no Ukrainian population. The new Polish local authorities, shortly before the outbreak of World War II, began to openly denationalize Ukrainians by their forced assimilation into Polish culture. Instead of calming down the situation, the persecutions inflamed it even more, increasing the mood of resistance and confrontation even among Ukrainians who had previously been the most loyal to the Polish state.

Polish rule over the provinces ended in September 1939, following Nazi and Soviet attack. After the Battle of Lviv, units of the Red Army entered regional capital, Lviv, and following the staged Elections to the People's Assemblies of Western Ukraine and Western Belarus, both eastern Galicia and Volhynia were annexed by the Soviet Union.

A few days after the Germans invaded Poland, Soviet dictator Joseph Stalin told an aide his long-term goal was the spread of Communism in Eastern Europe:

Now [Poland] is a fascist state, oppressing the Ukrainians, Belorussians, and so forth. The annihilation of that state under current conditions would mean one fewer bourgeois fascist state to contend with! What would be the harm if as a result of the rout off Poland we were to extend the socialist system onto new territories and populations.

Historian Geoffrey Roberts notes that the comments marked a change from the previous "popular front" policy of Communist Party cooperation with other parties. He adds, "Stalin's immediate purpose was to present an ideological rationale for the Red Army's forthcoming invasion of Poland" and his main message was the need to avoid a revolutionary civil war." Historian Timothy D. Snyder suggests that, "Stalin may have reasoned that returning Galicia and Volhynia to Soviet Ukraine would help co-opt Ukrainian nationalism. Stalin perhaps saw a way to give both Ukrainians and Poles something they wanted, while binding them to the USSR."

== World War II ==
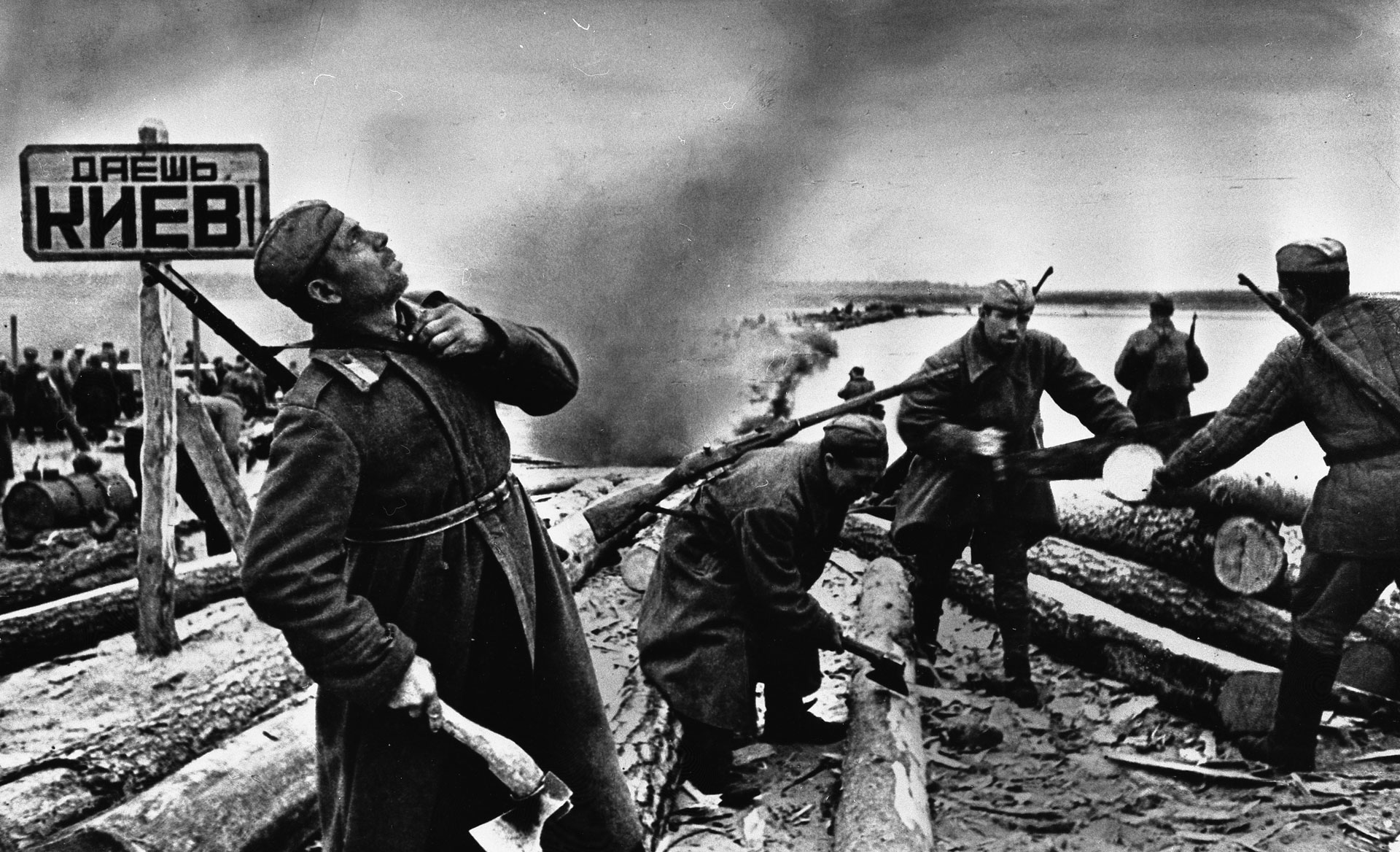
Soviet soldiers preparing rafts to cross the Dnieper during the Battle of the Dnieper (1943). The sign reads "To Kiev!".

Following the Ribbentrop-Molotov pact, in September 1939, German and Soviet troops divided the territory of Poland, including Galicia with its Ukrainian population. Next, after France surrendered to Germany, Romania ceded Bessarabia and northern Bukovina to Soviet demands. The Ukrainian SSR incorporated northern and southern districts of Bessarabia, the northern Bukovina, and additionally the Soviet-occupied Hertsa region, but ceded the western part of the Moldavian ASSR to the newly created Moldavian SSR. All these territorial gains were internationally recognized by the Paris Peace Treaties, 1947. When Nazi Germany with its allies invaded the Soviet Union in 1941, many Ukrainians and Polish people, particularly in the west where they had experienced two years of harsh Soviet rule, initially regarded the Wehrmacht soldiers as liberators. Retreating Soviets murdered thousands of prisoners. Some Ukrainian activists of the national movement hoped for momentum to establish an independent state of Ukraine. German policies initially gave some encouragement to such hopes through the vague promises of sovereign 'Greater Ukraine' as the Germans were trying to take advantage of anti-Soviet, anti-Ukrainian, anti-Polish, and anti-Jewish sentiments. A local Ukrainian auxiliary police was formed as well as Ukrainian SS division, 14th Waffen Grenadier Division of the SS (1st Galician). However, after the initial period of limited tolerance, the Germans soon abruptly changed policies and brutally crushed the Ukrainian national movement.

Some Ukrainians, however, utterly resisted the Nazi onslaught from its start and a partisan movement immediately spread over the occupied territory. Some elements of the Ukrainian nationalist underground formed a Ukrainian Insurgent Army that fought both Soviet and Nazi forces. In some western regions of Ukraine, the Ukrainian Insurgent Army survived underground and continued the resistance against the Soviet authorities well into the 1950s, though many Ukrainian civilians were murdered in this conflict by both sides.

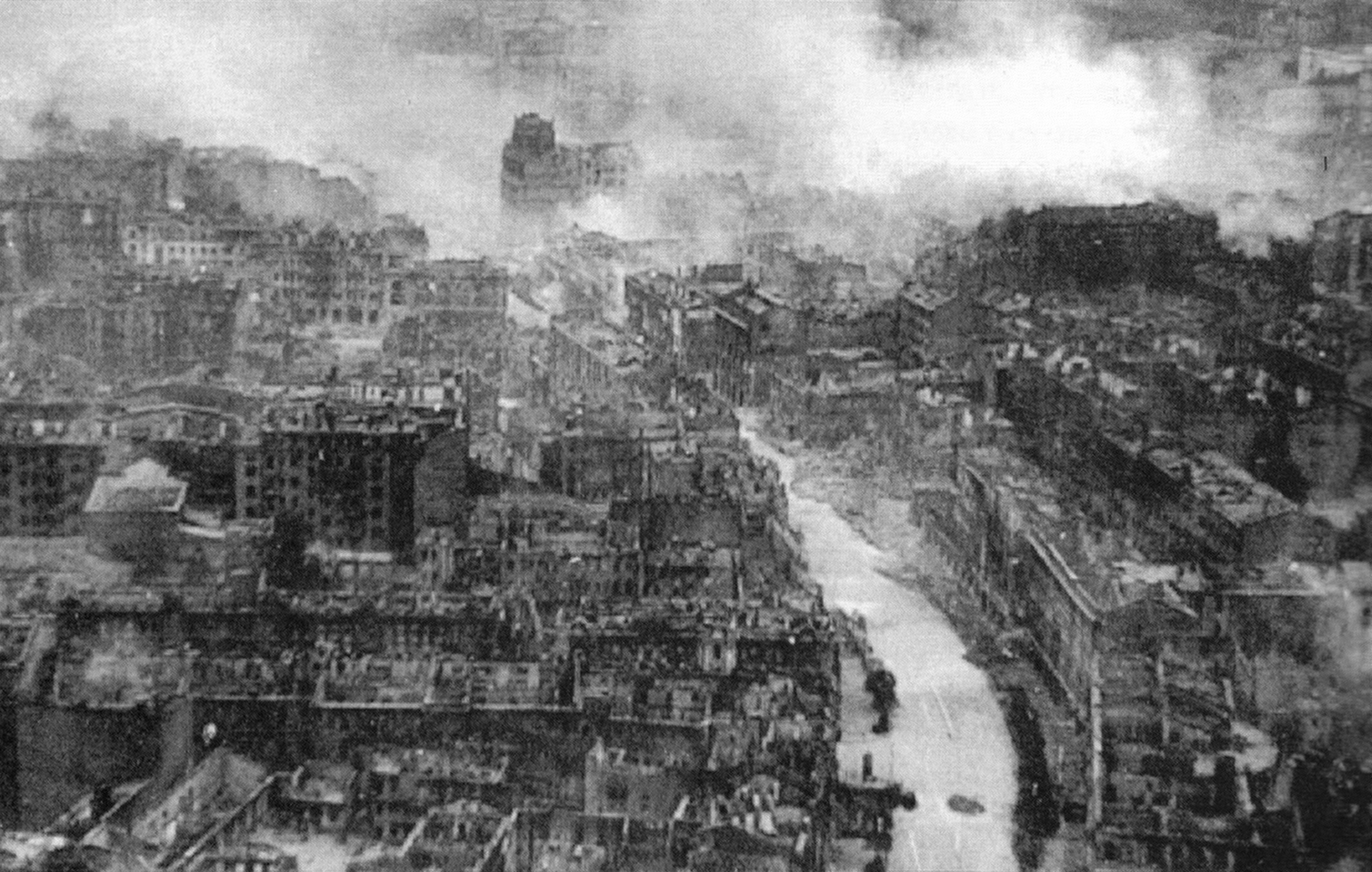
Burned out buildings in Kyiv during the Second World War

The Nazi administrators of conquered Soviet territories made little attempt to exploit the population's possible dissatisfaction with Soviet political and economic policies. Instead, the Nazis preserved the collective-farm system, systematically carried out genocidal policies against Jews, and deported many Ukrainians to forced labour in Germany. In their active resistance to Nazi Germany, the Ukrainians comprised a significant share of the Red Army and its leadership as well as the underground and resistance movements.

Total civilian losses during the war and German occupation in Ukraine are estimated at seven million, including over a million Jews shot and killed by the Einsatzgruppen.

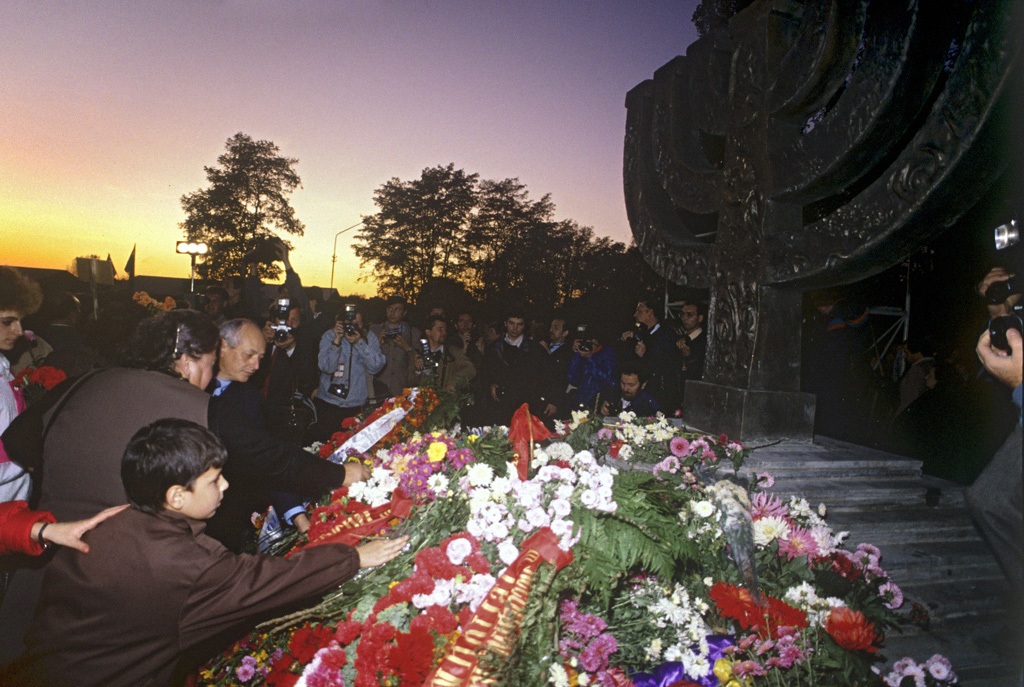
Wreath-laying ceremony in Babi Yar, where the Nazis murdered approximately 100,000 people

Many civilians fell victim to atrocities, forced labor, and even massacres of whole villages in reprisal for attacks against Nazi forces. Of the estimated eleven million Soviet troops who fell in battle against the Nazis, about 16% (1.7 million) were ethnic Ukrainians. Moreover, Ukraine saw some of the biggest battles of the war starting with the encirclement of Kyiv (the city itself fell to the Germans on 19 September 1941 and was later acclaimed as a Hero City) where more than 660,000 Soviet troops were taken captive, to the fierce defense of Odesa, and on to the victorious storming across the Dnieper river in the 1943 Battle of Kyiv. Kyiv was liberated by the Soviet Red Army on 6 November 1943.

During a period of March 1943 to the end of 1944 Ukrainian Insurgent Army committed several massacres on the Polish civilian population in Volhynia and Eastern Galicia having every signs of genocide (massacres of Poles in Volhynia and Eastern Galicia). The death toll numbered up to 100 000, mostly children and women.

Late October 1944 the last territory of current Ukraine (near Uzhhorod, then part of the Kingdom of Hungary) was cleared of Germany troops; this is annually celebrated in Ukraine (on 28 October) as the "anniversary of the liberation of Ukraine from the Nazis".

Late March 2019 former members of armed units of the Organization of Ukrainian Nationalists, former Ukrainian Insurgent Army members and former members of the Polissian Sich/Ukrainian People's Revolutionary Army, members of the Ukrainian Military Organization and Carpathian Sich soldiers were officially granted the status of veterans. This meant that for the first time they could receive veteran benefits, including free public transport, subsidized medical services, annual monetary aid, and public utilities discounts (and will enjoy the same social benefits as former Ukrainian soldiers Red Army of the Soviet Union). (There had been several previous attempts to provide former Ukrainian nationalist fighters with official veteran status, especially during the 2005-2009 administration President Viktor Yushenko, but all failed.)

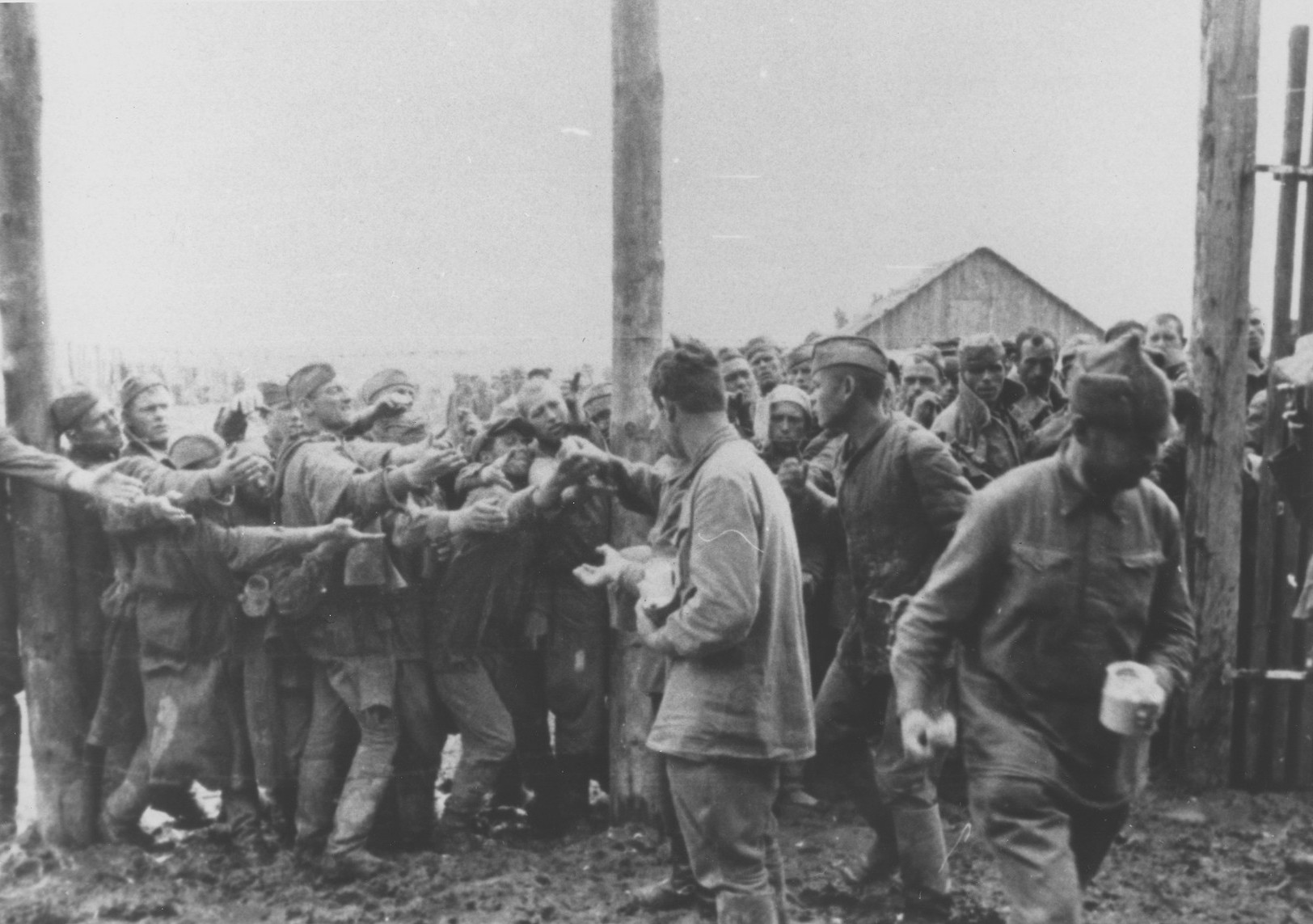
Vinnytsia, July 1941. Some 2.8 million Soviet POWs were killed in just eight months of 1941–42

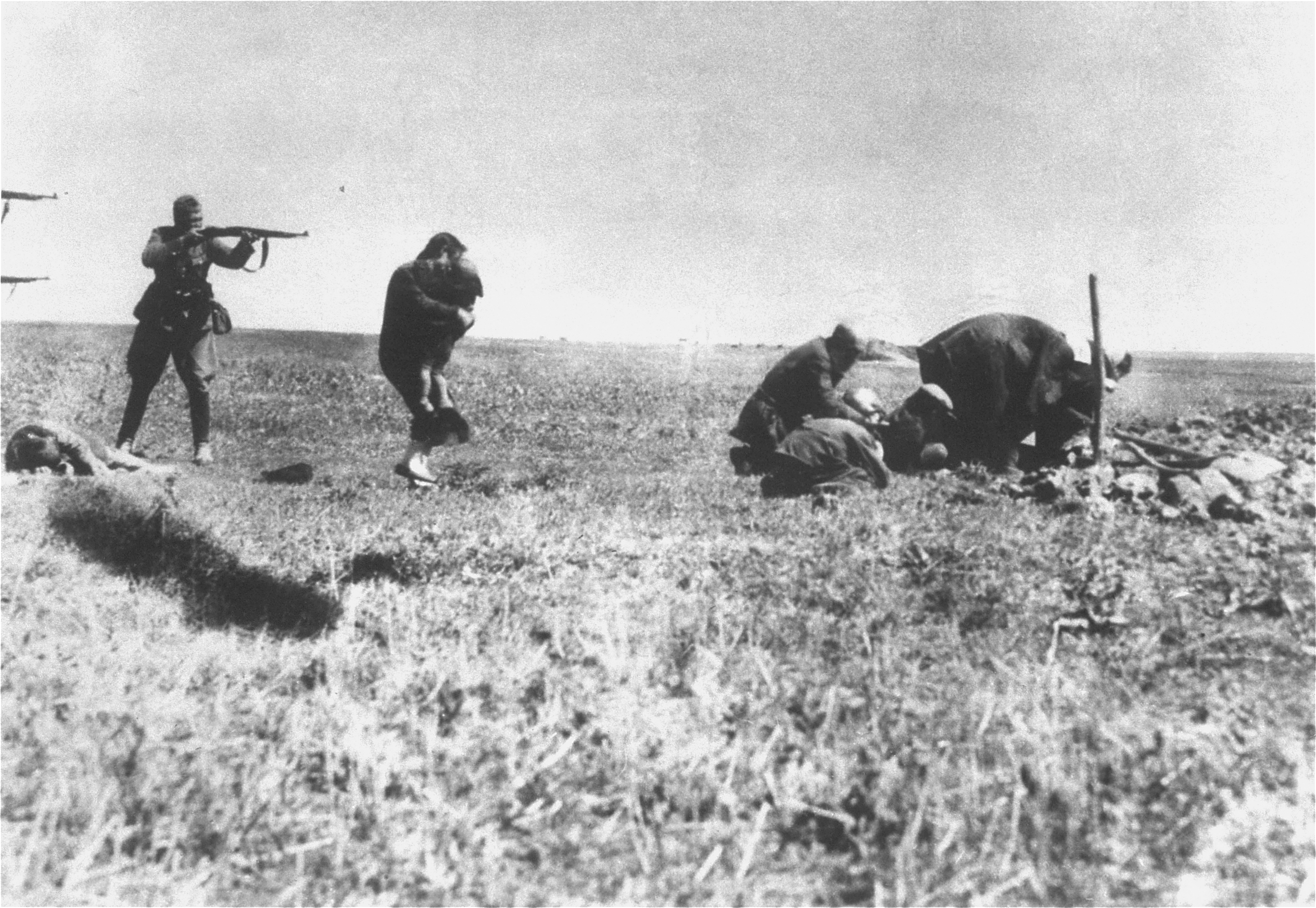
Executions of Kyiv Jews by German army mobile killing units (Einsatzgruppen) near Ivangorod, 1942

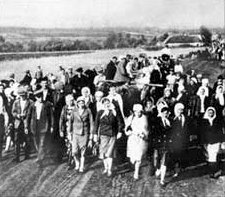
Ukrainians being deported to Nazi Germany for forced labor, 1942

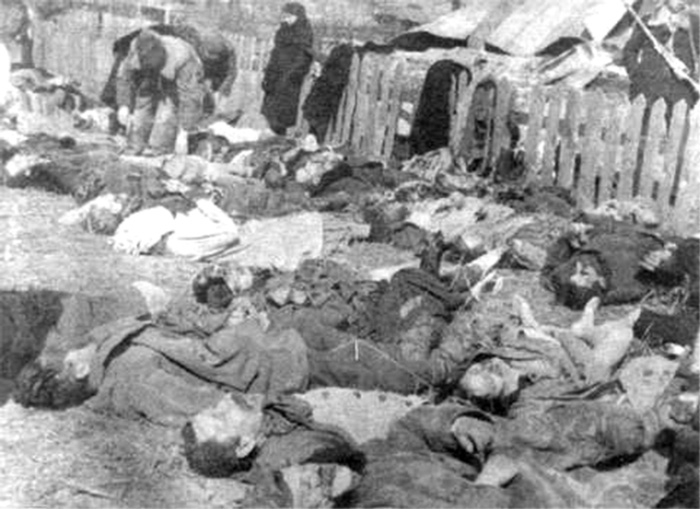
Massacres of Poles in Volhynia in 1943

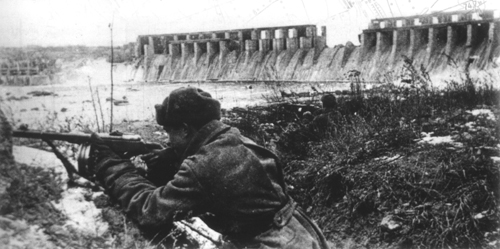
Battle of the dam in Zaporizhia, 1943

== Post-war (1945–1991) ==
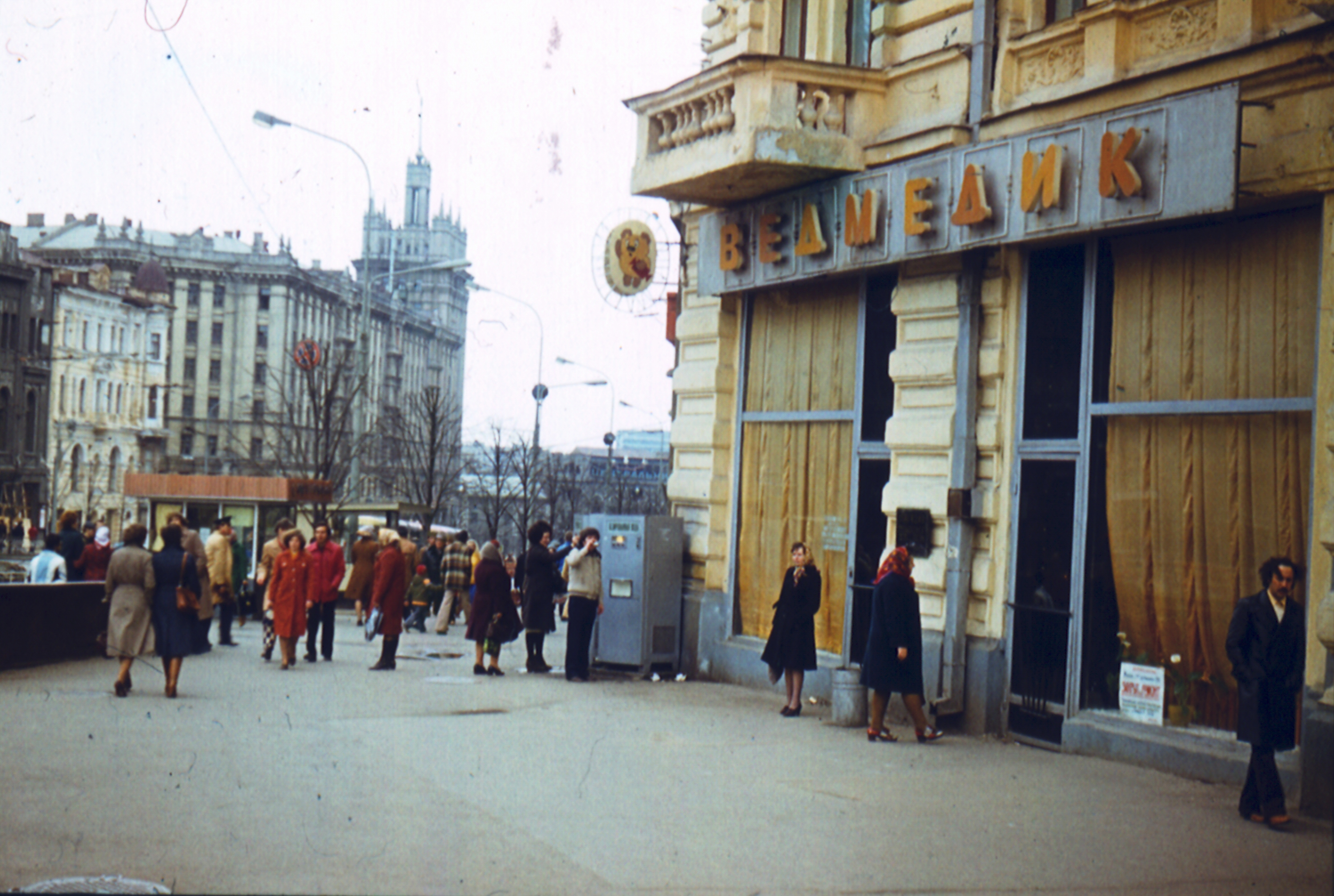
Kharkiv in 1981

After World War II some amendments to the Constitution of the Ukrainian SSR were accepted, which allowed it to act as a separate subject of international law in some cases and to a certain extent, remaining a part of the Soviet Union at the same time. In particular, these amendments allowed the Ukrainian SSR to become one of founding members of the United Nations (UN) together with the Soviet Union and the Byelorussian SSR. This was part of a deal with the United States to ensure a degree of balance in the General Assembly, which, the USSR opined, was unbalanced in favor of the Western Bloc. In its capacity as a member of the UN, the Ukrainian SSR was an elected member of the United Nations Security Council in 1948–1949 and 1984–1985.

Over the next decades, the Ukrainian republic not only surpassed pre-war levels of industry and production but also was the spearhead of Soviet power. Ukraine became the centre of Soviet arms industry and high-tech research. The republic was also turned into a Soviet military outpost in the Cold War, a territory crowded by military bases packed with the most up-to-date weapons systems.

Such an important role resulted in a major influence of the local elite. Many members of the Soviet leadership came from Ukraine, most notably Nikita Khrushchev and Leonid Brezhnev a Soviet leader from 1964 to 1982, as well as many prominent Soviet sportsmen, scientists, and artists. In 1954, the Russian-populated oblast of Crimea was transferred from the Russian to the Ukrainian Soviet Republic.

However, the relatively underdeveloped industrial branches such as coal- and iron ore mining, metallurgy, chemical and energy industry dominated the republic's economy. Once a Cossack steppe, the southern oblasts of Dnipropetrovsk and Zaporizhzhia were turned into a highly industrialised area with rapidly increasing impact on its environment and public health. A pursuit to energy production sufficient for growing industry led to the gigantic nature-remastering: turning the Dnieper River into a regulated system of large reservoirs.

The products of the rapidly developed high-tech industry in Ukraine were largely directed for military consumption, similarly to much of the Soviet economy, and the supply and quality of consumer goods remained low compared even to the neighboring countries of the Eastern bloc. A state-regulated system of production and consumption lead to gradual decrease of quality of life and growing "shadowisation" of retail infrastructure as well as of corruption.

The town of Pripyat, Ukraine was the site of the Chernobyl disaster, which occurred on April 26, 1986, when a nuclear plant exploded. The fallout contaminated large areas of northern Ukraine and even parts of Belarus. This spurred on a local independence movement called the Rukh that helped expedite the break-up of the Soviet Union during the late 1980s.

== Independent Ukraine (1991 to present) ==
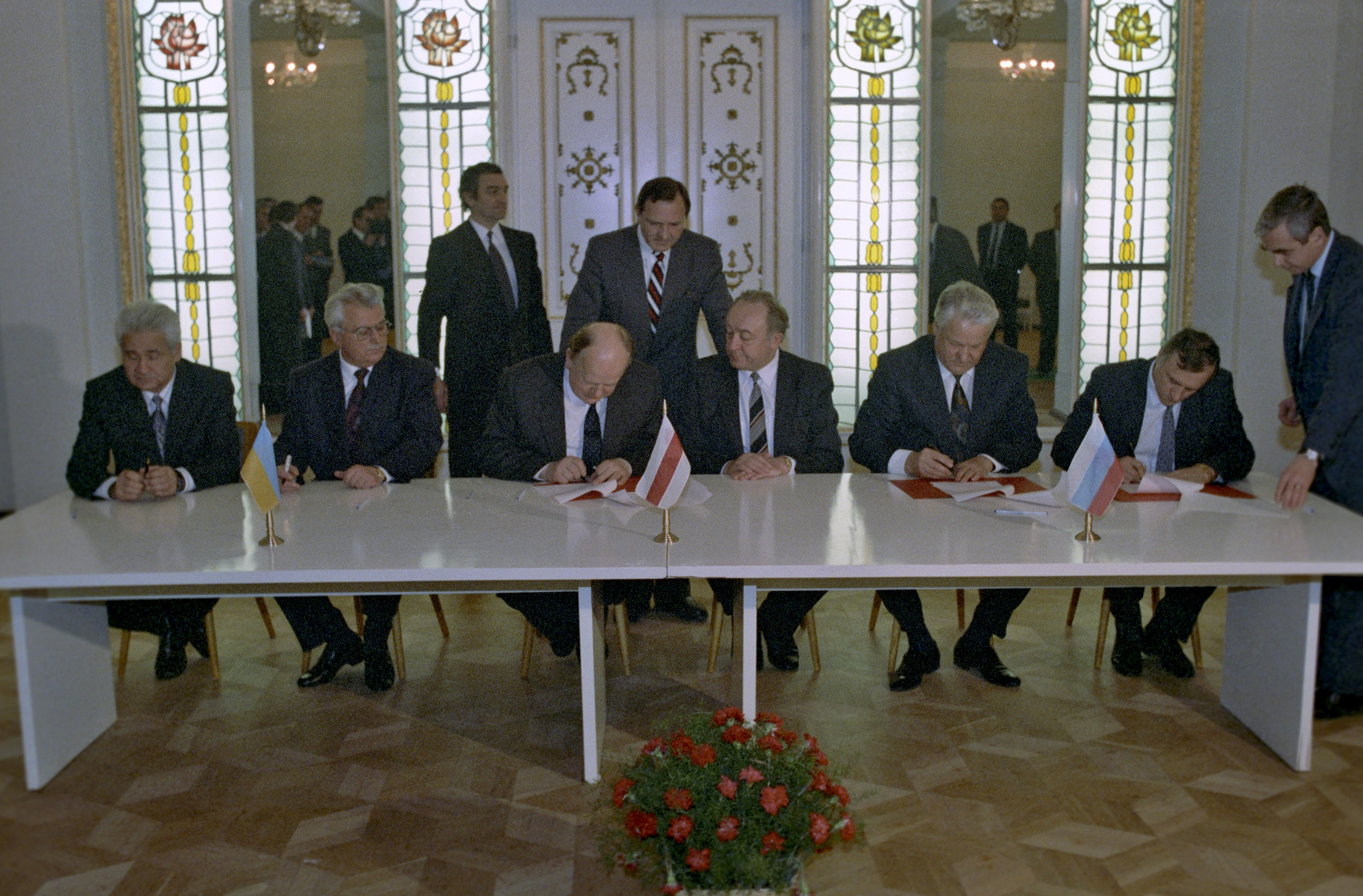
Ukrainian President Leonid Kravchuk and President of the Russian Federation Boris Yeltsin signed the Belavezha Accords, dissolving the Soviet Union, 8 December 1991

=== Kravchuk and Kuchma presidencies (1991–2004) ===
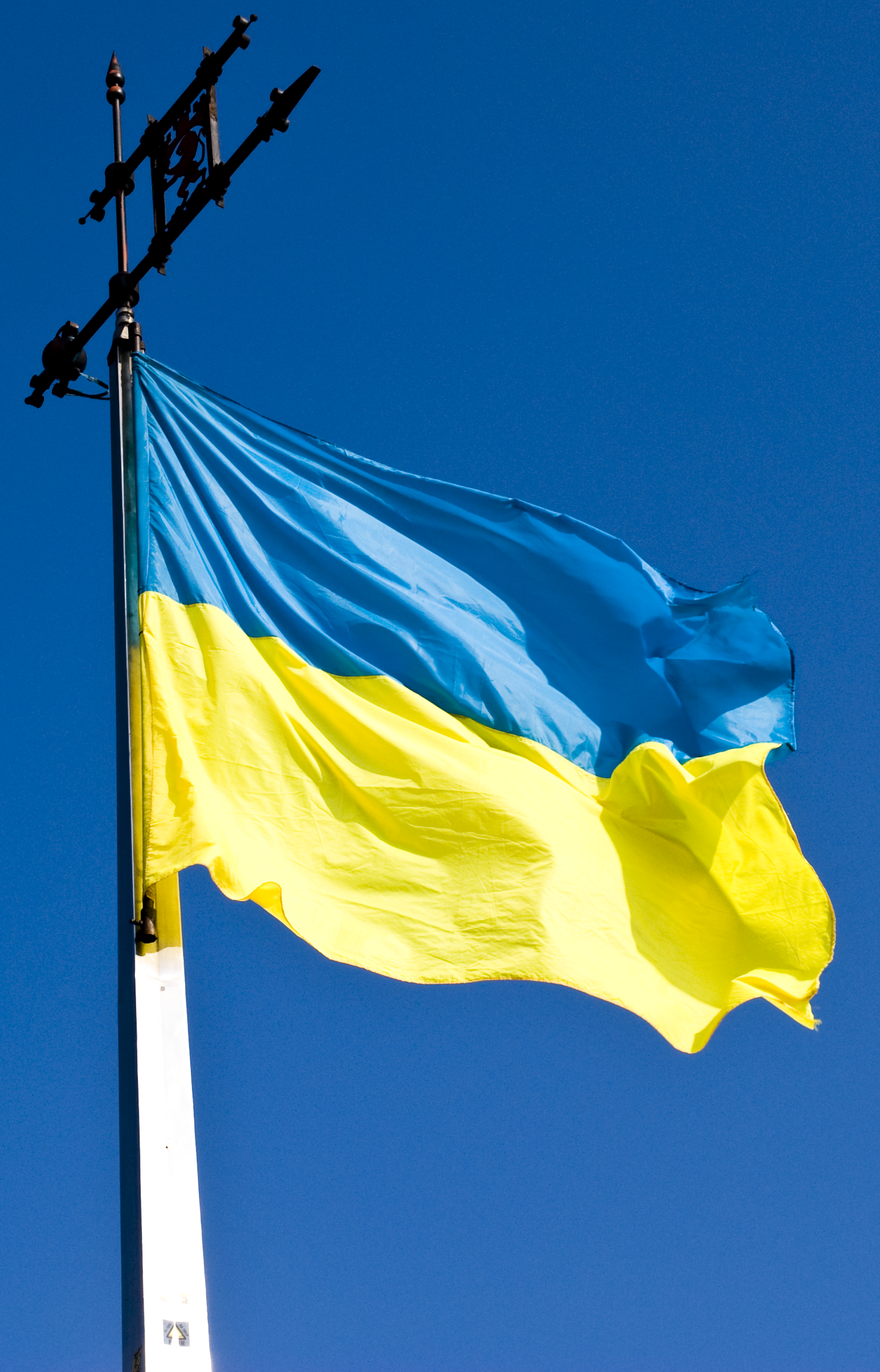
Modern Flag of Ukraine

On January 21, 1990, over 300,000 Ukrainians organised a human chain for Ukrainian independence between Kyiv and Lviv, in memory of the 1919 unification of the Ukrainian People's Republic and the West Ukrainian National Republic. Citizens came out to the streets and highways, forming live chains by holding hands in support of unity.

On July 16, 1990, the Verkhovna Rada adopted the Declaration of State Sovereignty of Ukraine, which, amongst other things, proclaimed that the republic would be "a permanently neutral state that does not participate in military blocs" and would not accept, nor produce, nor procure nuclear weapons. On October 2–17, 1990, the Revolution on Granite took place in Ukraine, the main purpose of the action was to prevent the signing of a new union treaty of the USSR. The demands of the students were satisfied by signing a resolution of the Verkhovna Rada, which guaranteed their implementation.

Ukraine officially declared itself an independent state on August 24, 1991, when the communist Supreme Soviet (parliament) of Ukraine proclaimed that Ukraine would no longer follow the laws of the USSR, and only follow the laws of the Ukrainian SSR, de facto declaring Ukraine's independence from the Soviet Union. On December 1, Ukrainian voters overwhelmingly approved a referendum formalising independence from the Soviet Union. Over 90% of Ukrainian citizens voted for independence, with majorities in every region, including 56% in Crimea, which had a 75% ethnic Russian population. The Soviet Union formally ceased to exist on December 26, when the presidents of Ukraine, Belarus, and Russia (the founding members of the USSR) met in Belovezh Pushcha to formally dissolve the Union in accordance with the Soviet Constitution. With this, Ukraine's independence was formalized de jure and recognised by the international community.

On 2 December 1991, Poland and Canada were the first countries to recognize Ukraine's independence.

The history of Ukraine between 1991 and 2004 was marked by the presidencies of Leonid Kravchuk and Leonid Kuchma. This was a time of transition for Ukraine. While it had attained nominal independence from Russia, its presidents maintained close ties with their neighbours.

On June 1, 1996, Ukraine became a non-nuclear nation, sending the last of the 1,900 strategic nuclear warheads it had inherited from the Soviet Union to Russia for dismantling. Ukraine had committed to this by signing the Budapest Memorandum on Security Assurances in January 1994.

The country adopted its constitution on June 28, 1996.

The Cassette Scandal of 2000 was one of the turning points in the post-independence history of the country.

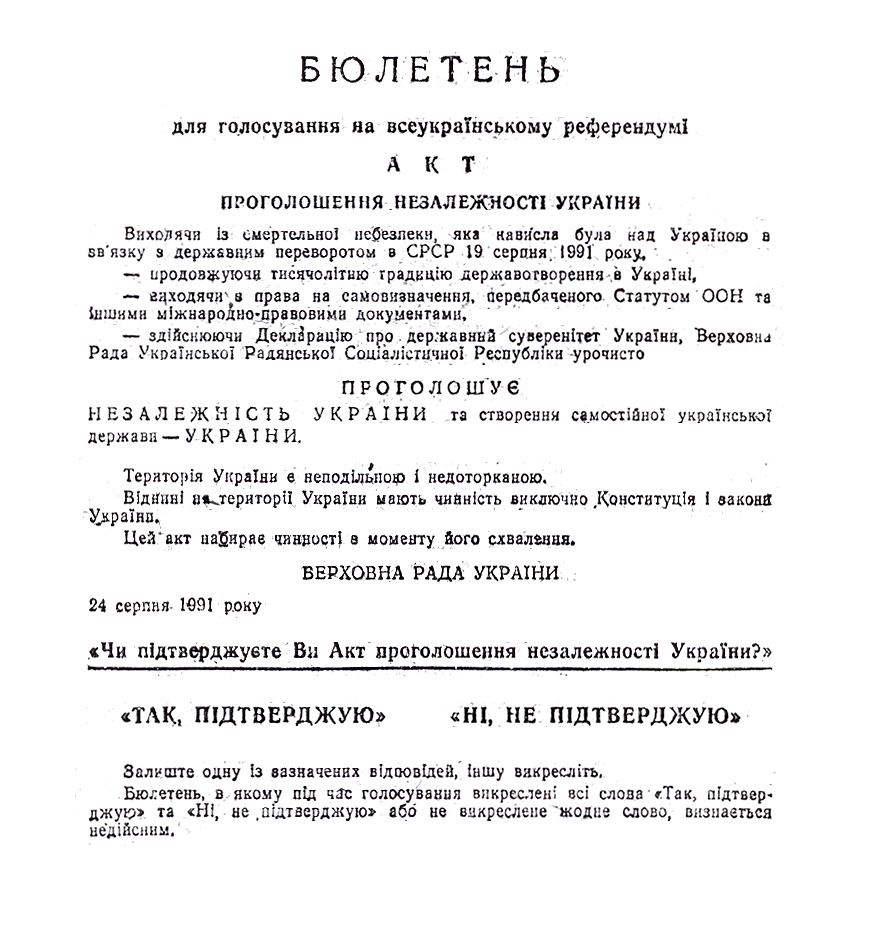
Declaration of Independence of Ukraine. As printed on the ballot for the national referendum on December 1, 1991.

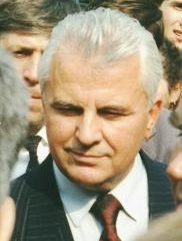
Leonid Kravchuk in 1992

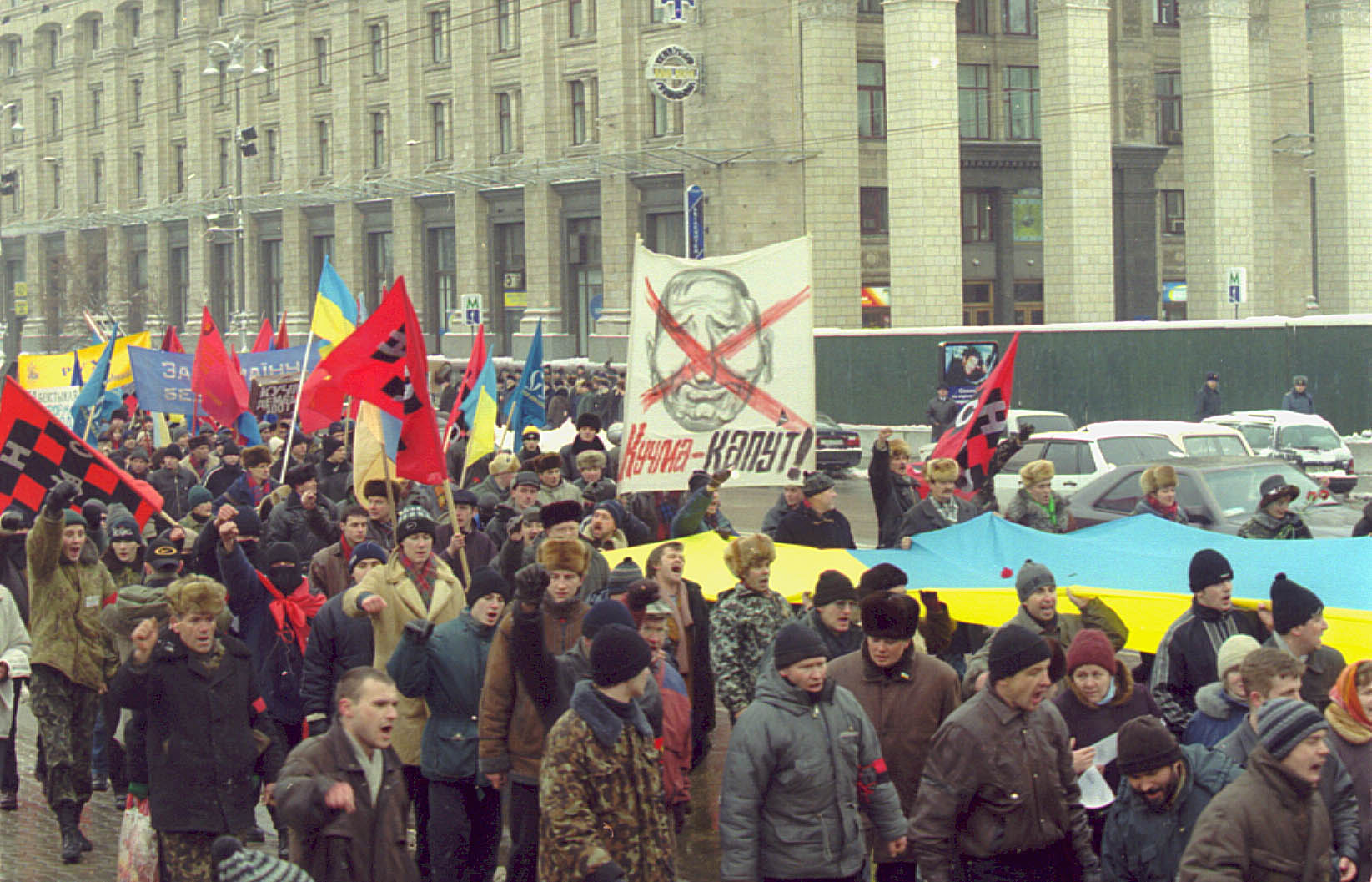
Ukraine Without Kuchma protests. 6 February 2001

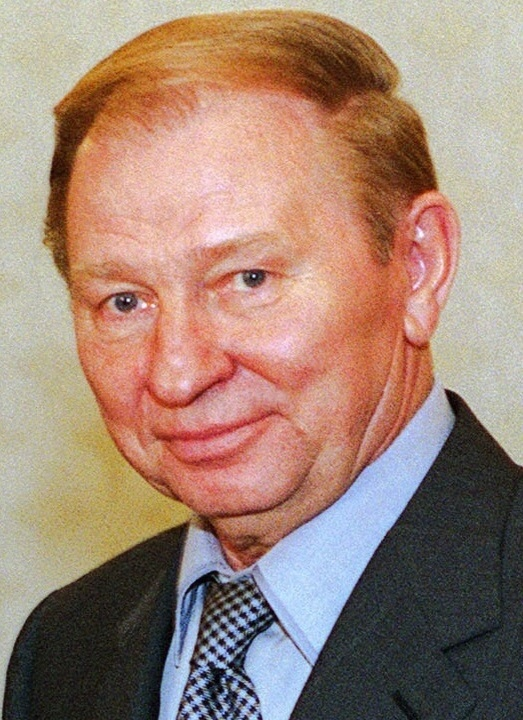
Leonid Kuchma

Distribution of votes in Ukrainian presidential elections of 12/01/1991. Leonid Kravchuk 19,643,481 (61.59%) (blue) Viacheslav Chornovil 7.420.727 (23,27%) (orange)	Distribution of votes in the 2nd round of the 1994 Ukrainian Presidential elections (07/10/1994). Leonid Kuchma 14,016,850 (52.3%) (blue) Leonid Kravchuk 12,111,603 (45.2%) (violet)	Distribution of votes in the 2nd round of the 1999 Ukrainian presidential election (11/14/1999). Leonid Kuchma 15,870,722 (57.7%) (blue) Petro Symonenko 10,665,420 (38.8%) (red)

=== Orange Revolution (2004) ===
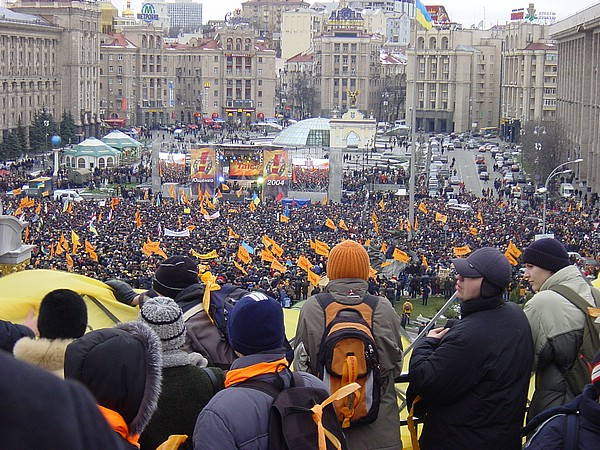
Protesters at Independence Square on the first day of the Orange Revolution.

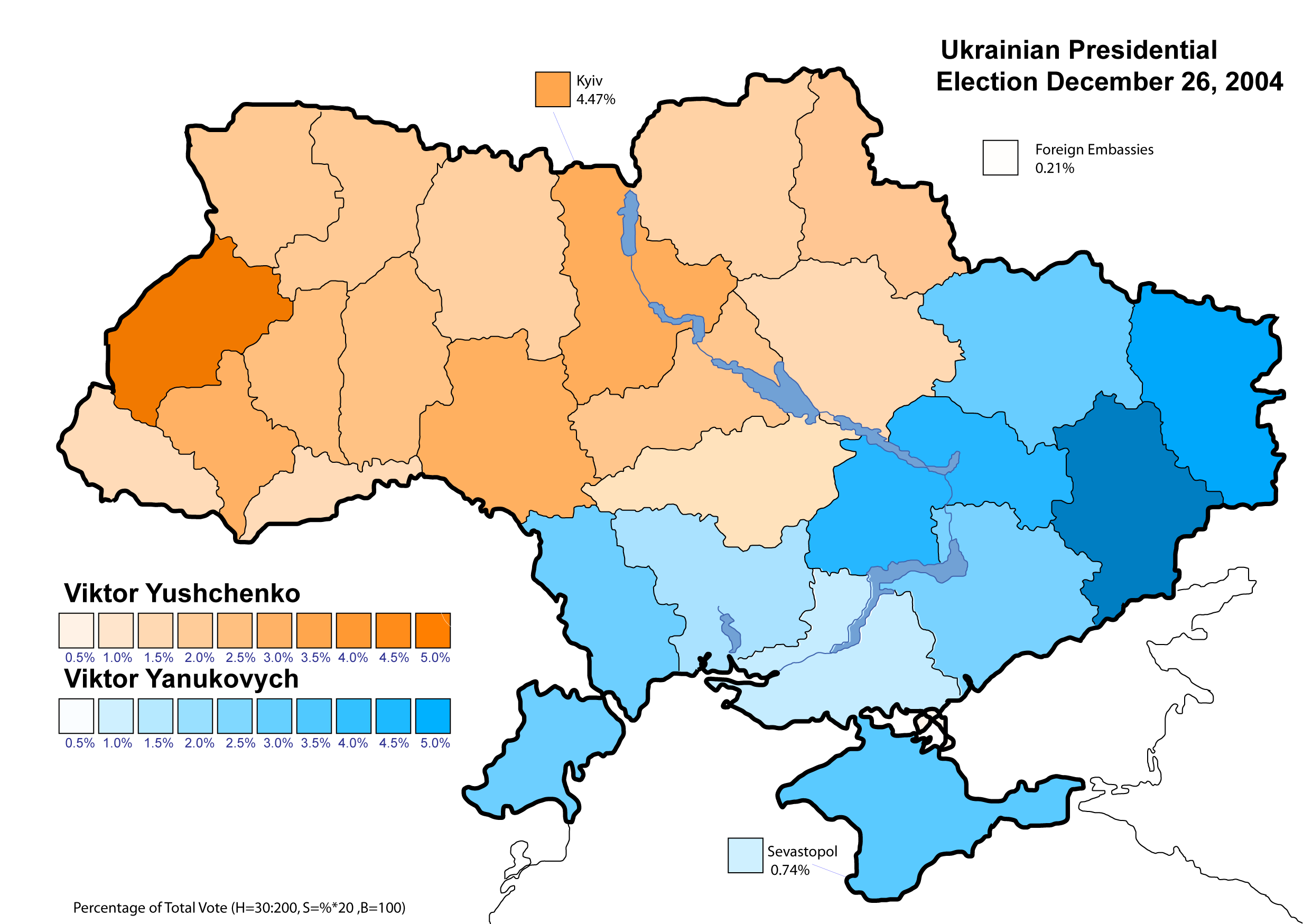
Distribution of votes in the 2nd round of the 2004 Ukrainian presidential election (12/26/2004). Viktor Yushchenko 15,115,712 (51.99%) (orange) Viktor Yanukovych 12,481,266 (44.20%) (blue)

In 2004, Leonid Kuchma announced that he would not run for re-election. Two major candidates emerged in the 2004 presidential election. Viktor Yanukovych, the incumbent Prime Minister, supported by both Kuchma and by the Russian Federation, wanted closer ties with Russia. The main opposition candidate, Viktor Yushchenko, called for Ukraine to turn its attention westward and eventually join the EU.

In the runoff election, Yanukovych officially won by a narrow margin, but Yushchenko and his supporters cried foul, alleging that vote rigging and intimidation cost him many votes, especially in eastern Ukraine. A political crisis erupted after the opposition started massive street protests in Kyiv and other cities, and the Supreme Court of Ukraine ordered the election results null and void. A second runoff found Viktor Yushchenko the winner. Five days later, Viktor Yanukovych resigned from office and his cabinet was dismissed on January 5, 2005.

=== Yushchenko presidency ===
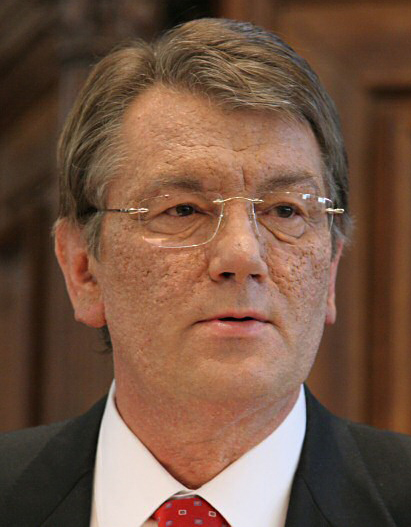
Yushchenko at the University of Amsterdam, with chloracne from TCDD dioxin poisoning (2006).

In March 2006, the Verkhovna Rada elections took place and three months later the official government was formed by the "Anti-Crisis Coalition" among the Party of Regions, Communist, and Socialist parties. The latter party switched from the "Orange Coalition" with Our Ukraine, and the Yulia Tymoshenko Bloc.

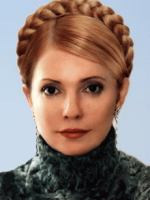
Yulia Tymoshenko in 2006

The new coalition nominated Viktor Yanukovych for the post of Prime Minister. Yanukovych once again became Prime Minister, while the leader of the Socialist Party, Oleksander Moroz, managed to secure the position of chairman of parliament, which is believed by many to have been the reason for his leaving the Orange Coalition, where he had not been considered for this position.

On April 2, 2007, President Yushchenko dissolved the Verkhovna Rada because members of his party were defecting to the opposition. His opponents called the move unconstitutional. When they took the matter to the Constitutional Court, Yushchenko dismissed 3 of the court's 18 judges, accusing them of corruption.

During the Yushchenko term, relations between Russia and Ukraine often appeared strained as Yushchenko looked towards improved relations with the European Union and less toward Russia. In 2005, a highly publicized dispute over natural gas prices took place, involving Russian state-owned gas supplier Gazprom, and indirectly involving many European countries which depend on natural gas supplied by Russia through the Ukrainian pipeline. A compromise was reached in January 2006, and in early 2010 a further agreement was signed locking the price of Russian gas at $100 per 1,000 cubic meters in an exclusive arrangement.

By the time of the presidential election of 2010, Yushchenko and Tymoshenko — allies during the Orange Revolution — had become bitter enemies. Tymoshenko ran for president against both Yushchenko and Viktor Yanukovych, creating a three-way race. Yushchenko, whose popularity had plummeted, refused to close ranks and support Tymoshenko, thus dividing the anti-Yanukovych vote. Many pro-Orange voters stayed home. Yanukovych received 48% of the vote and Yushchenko less than 6%, an amount which, if thrown to Tymoshenko, who received 45%, would have prevented Yanukovych from gaining the presidency; since no candidate obtained an absolute majority in the first round of voting the two highest polling candidates contested in a run-off second ballot which Yanukovych won.

=== Yanukovych presidency ===
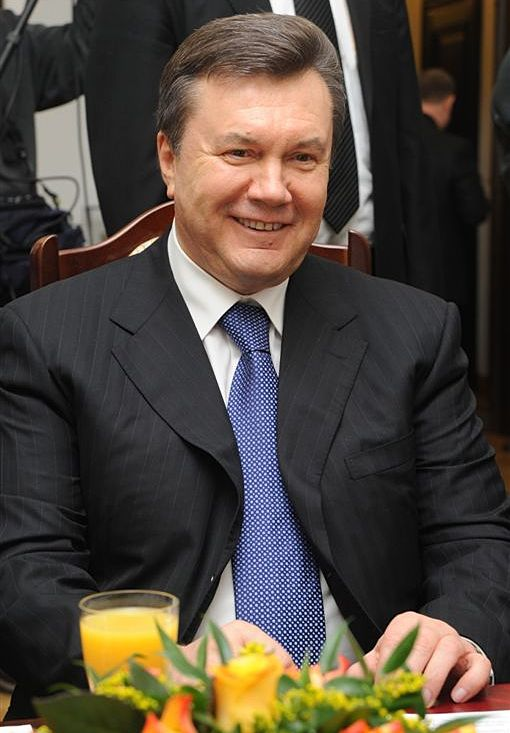
Viktor Yanukovych in the Polish Senate in 2011

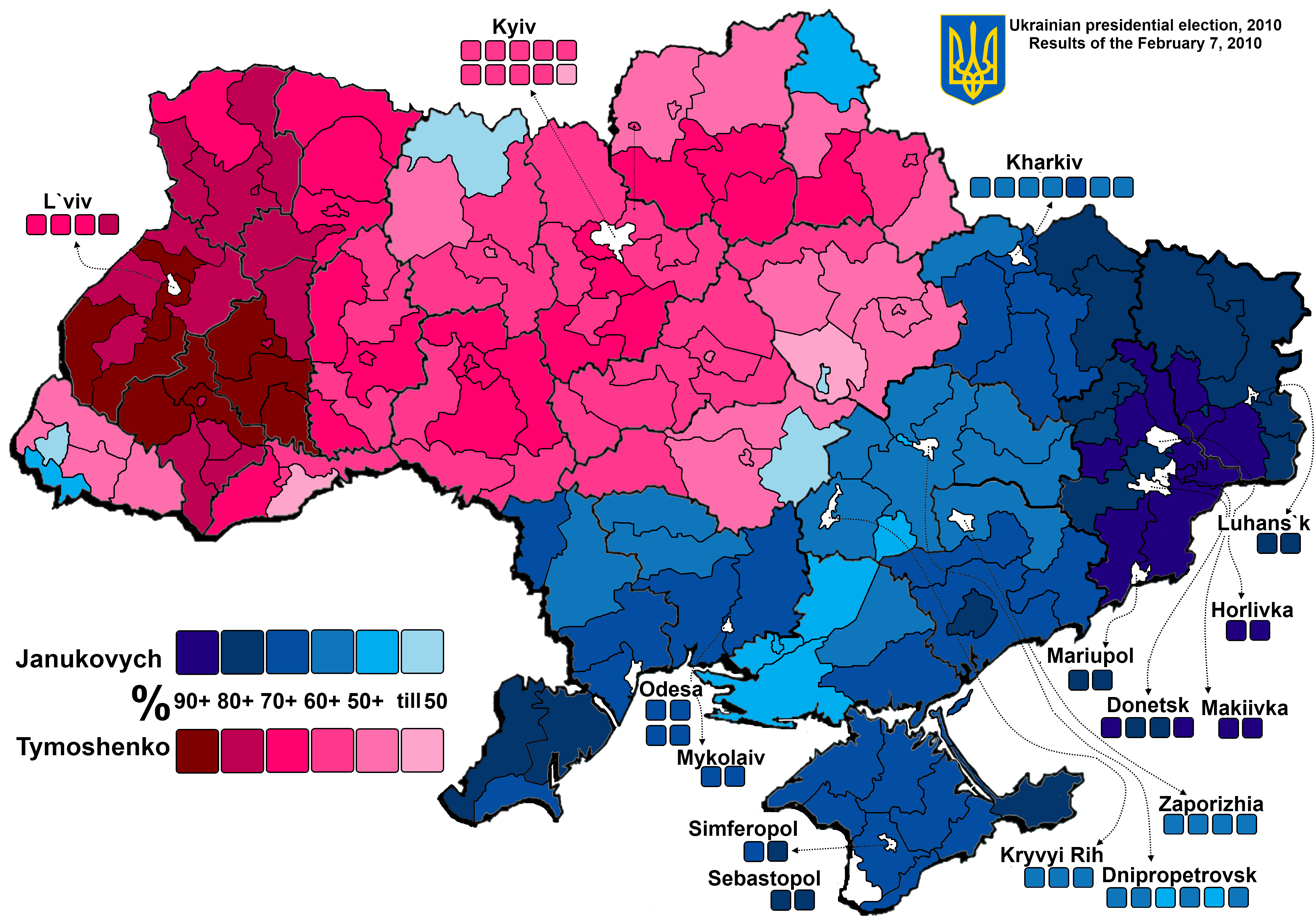
Distribution of votes in the 2nd round of the 2010 Ukrainian presidential election (02/07/2010). Viktor Yanukovych 12,481,266 (48.95%) (blue) Yulia Tymoshenko 11,593,357 (45.47%) (orange)

Euromaidan New Year 2014: Ruslana leads anti-Yanukovych protesters in singing the Ukrainian anthem and chanting "Slava Ukraini"

During Yanukovych's term he was accused of tightening of press restrictions and a renewed effort in the parliament to limit freedom of assembly. When young, Yanukovych was sentenced to three years because of theft, looting, and vandalism and later had his sentenced doubled. One frequently-cited example of Yanukovych's alleged attempts to centralize power was the August 2011 arrest of Yulia Tymoshenko. Other high-profile political opponents also came under criminal investigation since. On October 11, 2011, a Ukrainian court sentenced Tymoshenko to seven years in prison after she was found guilty of abuse of office when brokering the 2009 gas deal with Russia. The conviction was seen as "justice being applied selectively under political motivation" by the European Union and other international organizations.

In November 2013, President Yanukovych did not sign the Ukraine–European Union Association Agreement and instead pursued closer ties with Russia. This move sparked protests on the streets of Kyiv. Protesters set up camps in Maidan Nezalezhnosti (Independence Square), and in December 2013 and January 2014 protesters started taking over various government buildings, first in Kyiv, and later in Western Ukraine. Battles between protesters and police resulted in about eighty deaths in February 2014.

Following the violence, the parliament turned against Yanukovych and on February 22, 2014, voted to remove him from power, and to free Yulia Tymoshenko from prison. The same day Yanukovych supporter Volodymyr Rybak resigned as speaker of the parliament, and was replaced by Tymoshenko loyalist Oleksandr Turchynov, who was subsequently installed as interim president. Yanukovych fled Kyiv.

=== Euromaidan and Russo-Ukrainian War ===
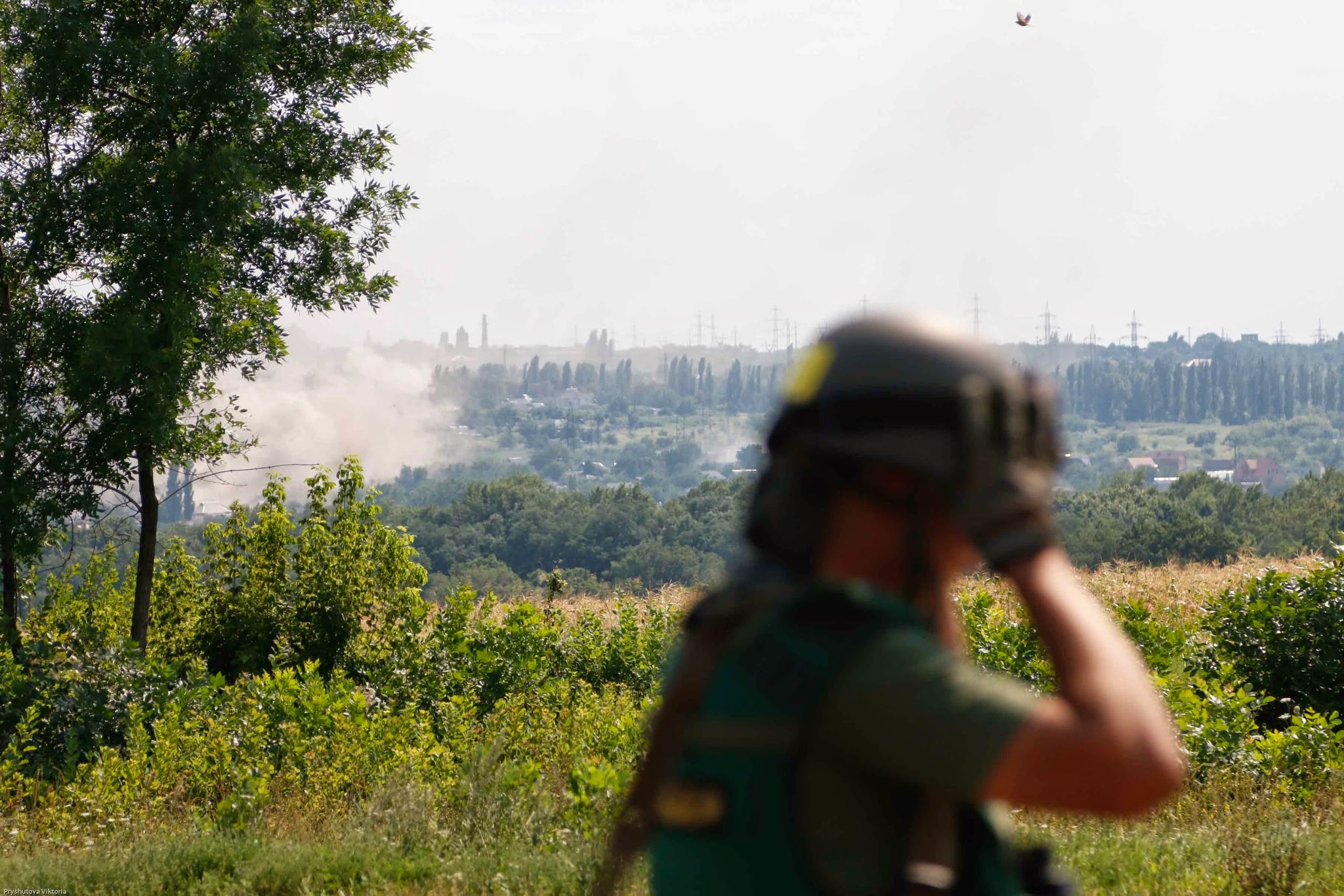
War in Donbas, Pervomaisk City, July 2014

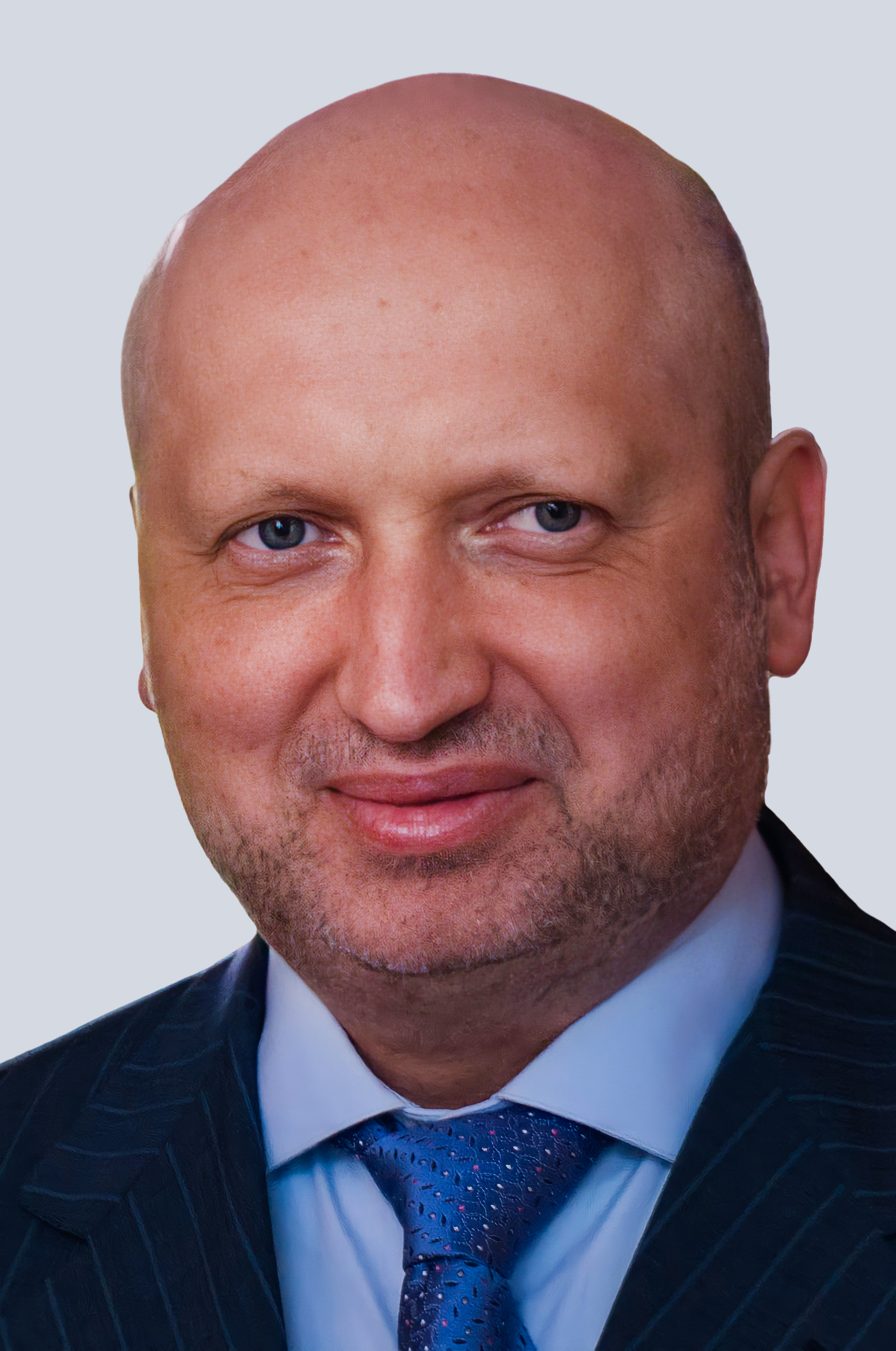
Oleksand Turchynov, Former Acting President of Ukraine

Civil unrest broke out in Kyiv as part of Ukraine's Euromaidan protest movement against the government. The conflict escalated rapidly, leading to the overthrow of the government of President Viktor Yanukovych and the setting up of a new government to replace it within a few days. Yanukovych fled to Russia and is wanted in Ukraine for the killing of protesters. Russia in particular holds that the transition was a "coup".

Conflict continued with the February–March Crimean crisis when Russian forces seized control of the Crimea region. Crimea was unilaterally annexed by Russia on 18 March 2014.

The annexation of Crimea was followed by pro-Russian unrest in east Ukraine and south Ukraine. In April 2014 Russian collaborators self-proclaimed the Donetsk People's Republic and Luhansk People's Republic and held illegal referendums on 11 May 2014; the collaborators claimed nearly 90% voted in favour of independence. Later in April 2014 fighting between the Ukrainian army and pro-Ukrainian volunteer battalions against forces supporting the Donetsk People's Republic and Luhansk People's Republic escalated into the war in Donbas. By December 2014 more than 6,400 people had died in this conflict and according to United Nations figures it led to over half a million people internally displaced within Ukraine and two hundred thousand refugees to flee to (mostly) Russia and other neighbouring countries. At the end of 2020 the death toll of the conflict had risen to more than 13,000 people and nearly 1.5 million people displaced.

=== Poroshenko presidency ===
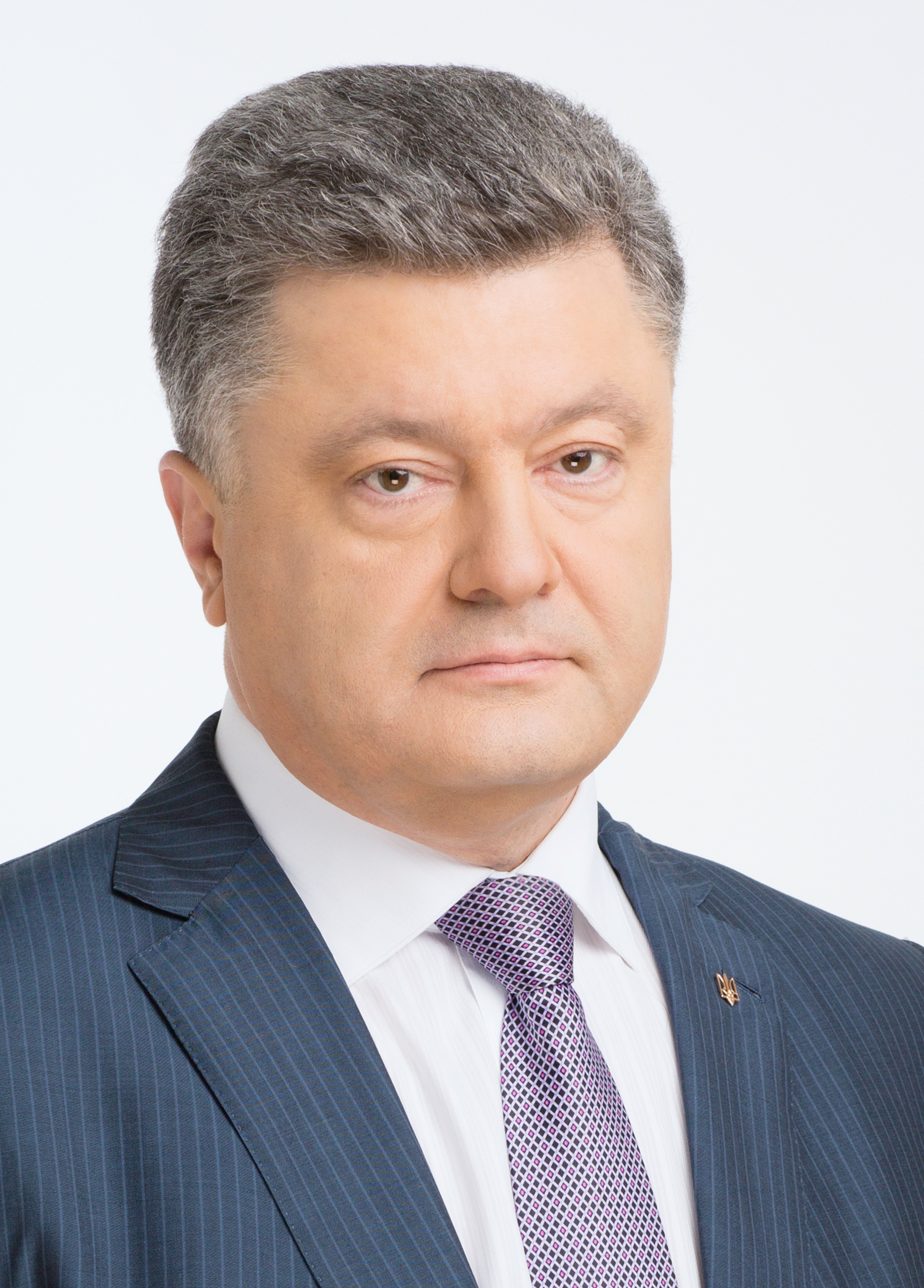
Petro Poroshenko

In the early presidential elections in June 2014, Petro Poroshenko won. His task was leading the country as it was in the worst condition compared to the state of the country for his predecessors — the parliamentary opposition, the economic crisis, the war. On June 20, a unilateral one-week truce was declared with a simultaneous ultimatum to pro-Russian mercenaries and local militants to leave the country, after which the liberation of the state began, which was thwarted by the already open Russian armed aggression. With the help of Western countries, Ukraine managed to freeze the war on the line of demarcation, and Russia to consolidate the permanent state of uncertainty in the Donbass in the Minsk agreements.

The economic part of the Ukraine–European Union Association Agreement was signed on 27 June 2014 by the President, Petro Poroshenko.

In October 2014, parliamentary elections were held. The People's Front (22%), the Bloc of Petro Poroshenko (22%), the Association "Samopomich" (11%), the Opposition Bloc (9%), the Radical Party of Oleh Liashko (7%), the Fatherland (5, 5%). For the first time, the later banned communists did not get there. In 2015, the president signed a "decommunization package of laws" and began dismantling the totalitarian legacy. Poroshenko managed to radically reform the Armed Forces in a few years, but, due to opposition from the old school command, only brought them closer to NATO standards. Similarly, the reform of another power wing, the Ministry of Internal Affairs, remained half-baked. The transformation of the Militsiia into the National Police of Ukraine, the creation of a powerful National Guard was combined with the development of a personal "business empire" by Minister Arsen Avakov. In February 2014, due to the depletion of gold and foreign exchange reserves, the national currency began to fall rapidly, further war and falling world prices for metals and food lowered its exchange rate to ₴25 per dollar in 2015. The country's GDP in 2014 fell by 10.1%, in 2015 - by 9.8%; inflation in 2014 was 24.9%.

On 1 January 2016, Ukraine joined the DCFTA with the EU. Ukrainian citizens were granted visa-free travel to the Schengen Area for up to 90 days during any 180-day period on 11 June 2017 and the Association Agreement formally came into effect on 1 September 2017.

With the help of the IMF and tough monetary and fiscal policy, it was possible to stabilize the country's financial situation and fill the empty state treasury. In economic reforms, Poroshenko relied on foreign specialists who were involved in the government. Among them was former Georgian President Mikheil Saakashvili, who will eventually stand in opposition to the president and significantly lower his confidence rating. At the same time, he enlisted the support of oligarchic circles for major changes, except for the nationalization of Nadra Bank by Dmytro Firtash, and in the process of breaking the system of large property built by Kuchma did not happen. On the contrary, the flight abroad of Ihor Kolomoiskyi, a Dnipro representative who helped fight separatists backed by Donetsk, and the nationalization of PrivatBank reminded many of the struggle for redistribution of property in the 1990s.

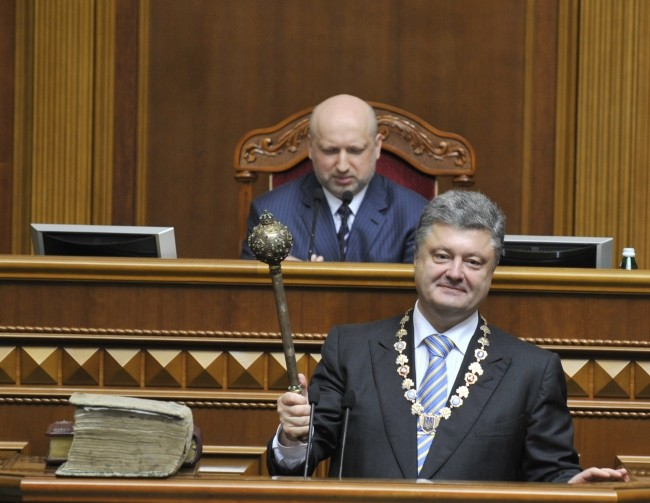
Inauguration of Petro Poroshenko

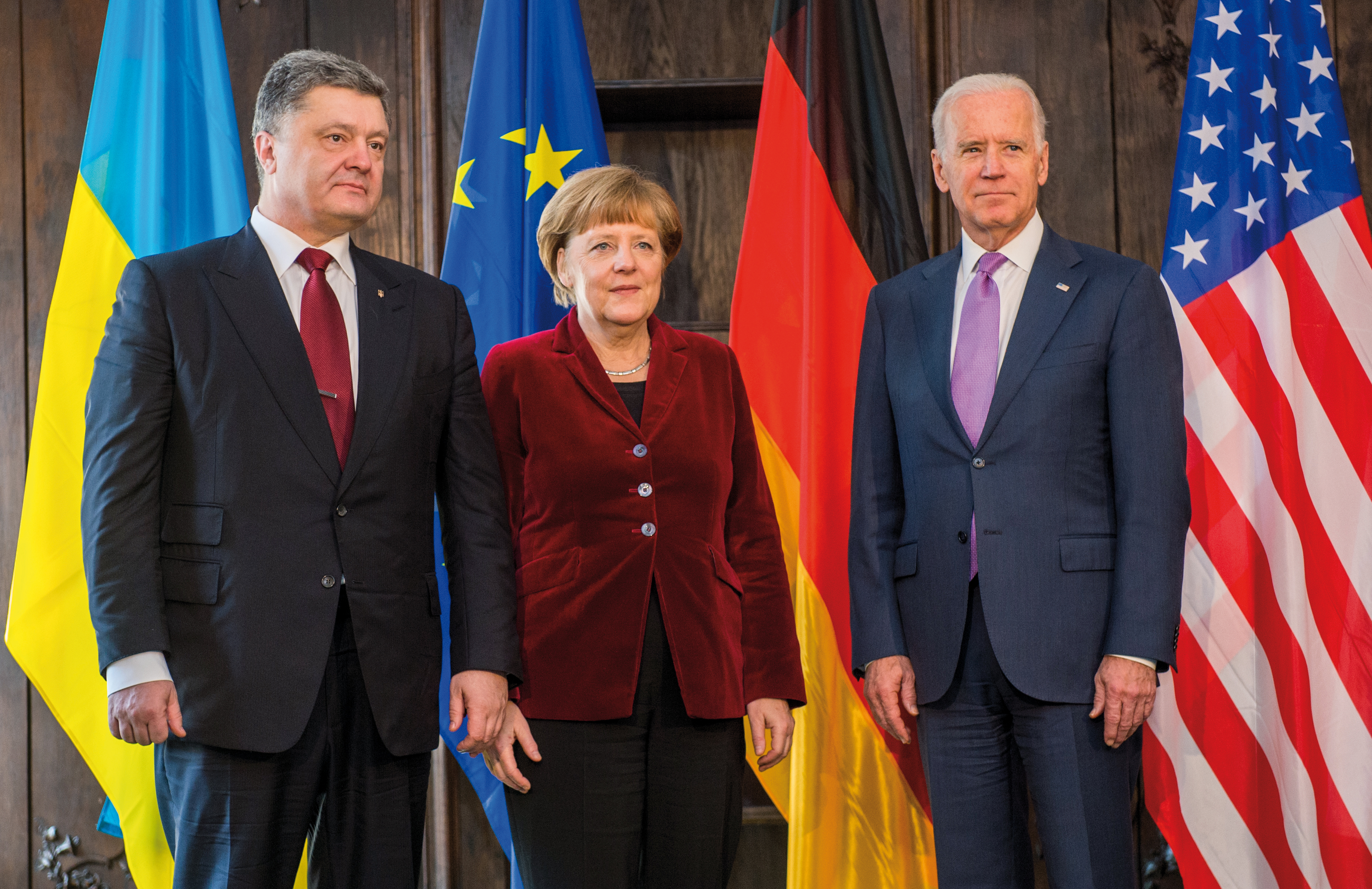
Petro Poroshenko with Angela Merkel and Joe Biden

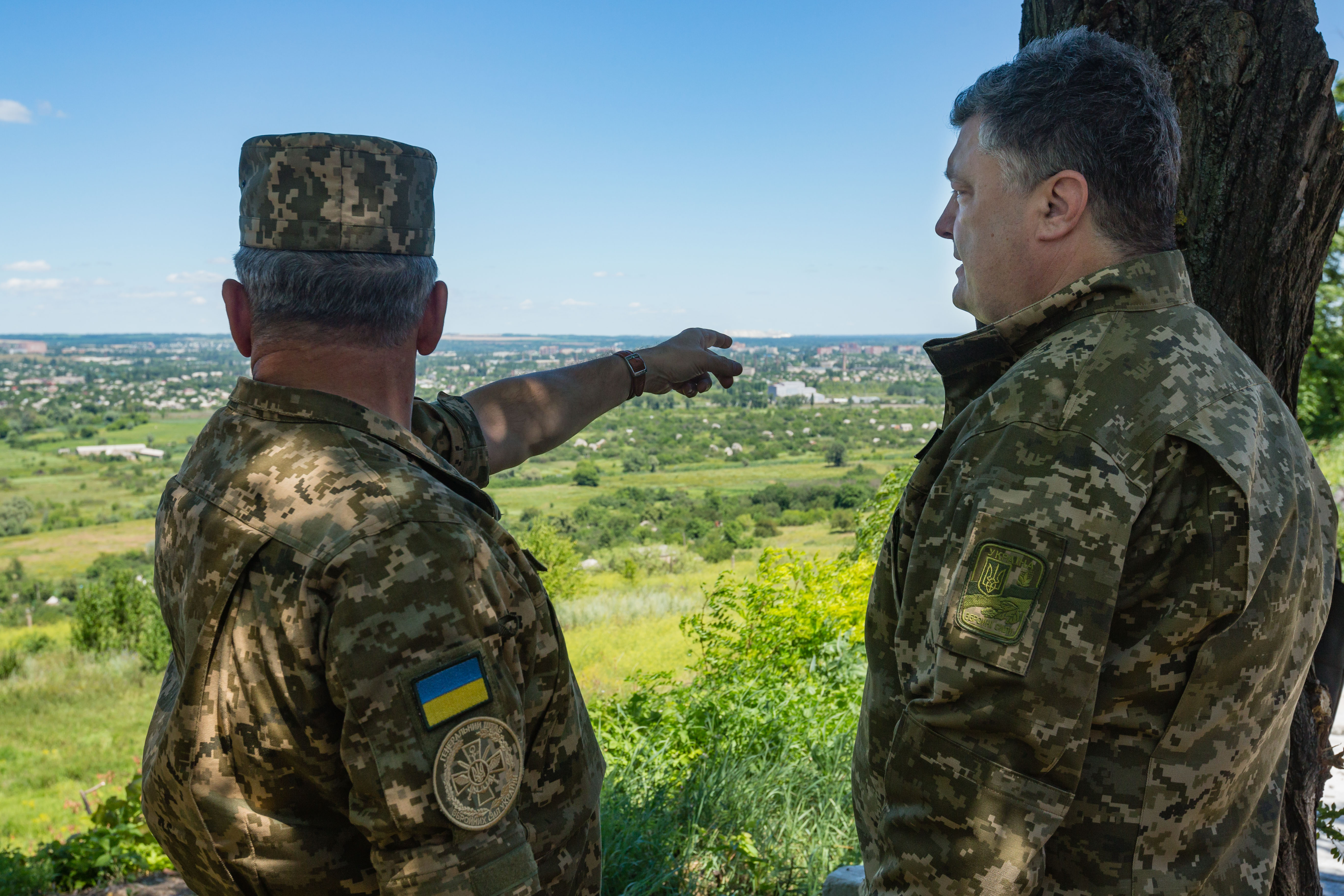
Poroshenko in the Donetsk oblast, 2016

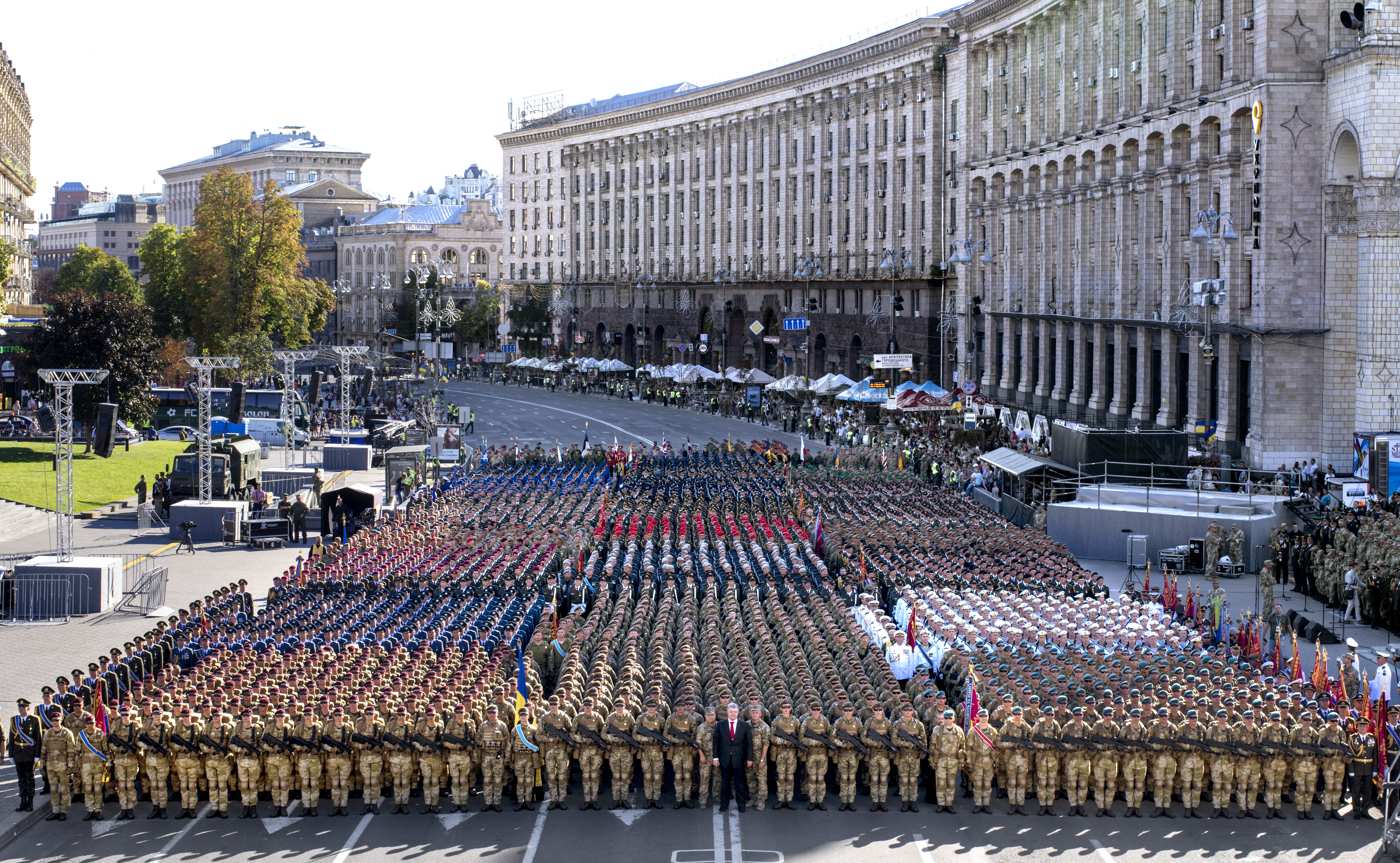
New Ukrainian army at a parade in Kyiv

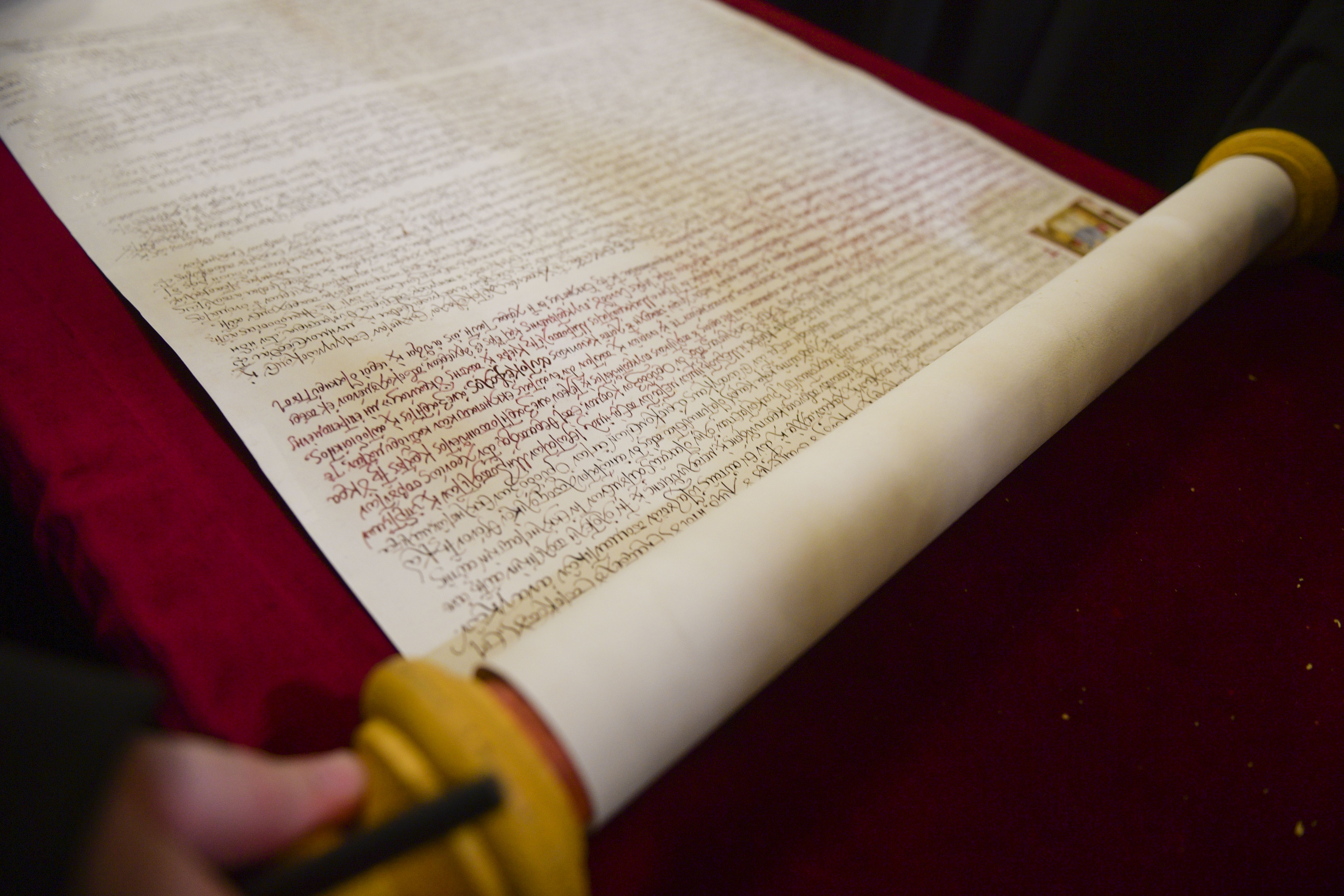
Tomos on the autocephaly of the Orthodox Church of Ukraine (Metropolitanate of Kyiv)

Significant achievements in the foreign policy arena: support for anti-Russian sanctions, obtaining a visa-free regime with the countries of the European Union, combined with the need to overcome extremely difficult tasks within the country. The old local authorities also did not want any changes: the authorities were cleansed of anti-Maidan activists (lustration), but in part. The fight against corruption was launched, limited to sentences of petty officials and electronic declarations, and the newly established NABU and NAPC were marked by scandals in their work. Judicial reform was combined with the appointment of old, compromised judges. The investigation of crimes against Maidan residents was delayed. In order to counteract the massive global Russian anti-Ukrainian propaganda in the "information war", the Ministry of Information Policy was created, which for 5 years, except for the ban on Kaspersky Lab, Dr.Web, 1С, Mail.ru, Yandex, Russian social networks VKontakte and Odnoklassniki, and propaganda media, did not show effective work. In 2017, the president signed the law "On Education", which met with opposition from national minorities and quarreled with the Government of Hungary.

On May 19, 2018, Poroshenko signed a Decree, which put into effect the decision of the National Security and Defense Council on the final termination of Ukraine's participation in the statutory bodies of the Commonwealth of Independent States. As of February 2019, Ukraine has minimized its participation in the Commonwealth of Independent States to a critical minimum and has effectively completed its withdrawal. The Verkhovna Rada of Ukraine did not ratify the accession, and Ukraine became a member of the CIS.

The Arbitration Institute of the Stockholm Chamber of Commerce satisfied Naftogaz's claims for compensation for gas supplies for transit that were not supplied by Gazprom. According to the decision of the Stockholm Arbitration, Naftogaz has achieved compensation in the amount of 4.63 billion dollars for Gazprom's failure to supply the agreed volumes of gas for transit. According to the results of two arbitration proceedings in Stockholm, Gazprom has to pay $2.56 billion in favor of Naftogaz.

The Kerch Strait incident occurred on 25 November 2018 when the Russian Federal Security Service (FSB) coast guard fired upon and captured three Ukrainian Navy vessels attempting to pass from the Black Sea into the Sea of Azov through the Kerch Strait on their way to the port of Mariupol.

On February 21, 2019, the Constitution of Ukraine was amended, the norms on the strategic course of Ukraine for membership in the European Union and NATO are enshrined in the preamble of the Basic Law, three articles and transitional provisions.

Procrastination with the sale of its own confectionery factory in the Lipetsk oblast of Russia, the scandal with the use of offshore to minimize taxes paid (Panamagate) also did not contribute to the high rating of the president. Even the historic acquisition of autocephaly from Ecumenical Patriarch Bartholomew I (tomos) and the creation of an independent Orthodox Church of Ukraine did not help restore the wasted trust in the Ukrainians. It was one of the most effective five years of Ukrainian state-building, but also one of the most controversial, when the president had to overcome the urgent challenges of the present, unable to break with the past.

=== Zelenskyy presidency ===
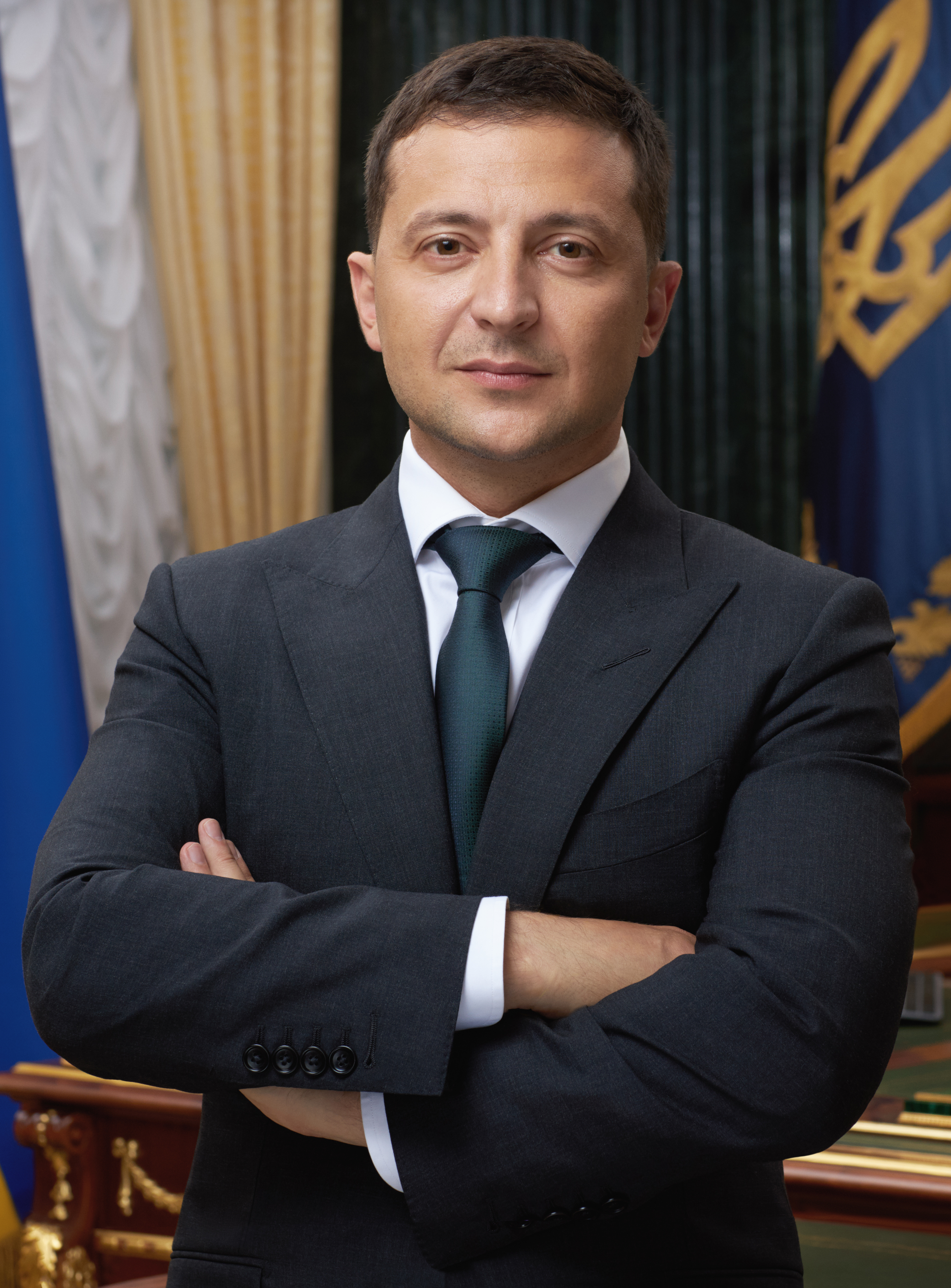
Volodymyr Zelenskyy

On April 21, 2019, in the second round of the presidential election, actor, and showman Volodymyr Zelenskyy won, who managed to consolidate the protest mood of various political spectrums around his own charismatic personality and get 73.23% of the vote. An inauguration ceremony took place on May 20, after which Zelenskyy announced the dissolution of the Verkhovna Rada and called early elections. Early parliamentary elections on July 21 allowed the newly formed pro-presidential Servant of the People party to win an absolute majority of seats for the first time in the history of independent Ukraine (248). Dmytro Razumkov, the party's chairman, was elected speaker of parliament. The majority was able to form a government on August 29 on its own, without forming coalitions, and approve Oleksii Honcharuk as prime minister. On March 4, 2020, due to a 1.5% drop in GDP (instead of a 4.5% increase at the time of the election), the Verkhovna Rada fired Honcharuk's government and Denys Shmyhal became the new Prime Minister.

On September 7, 2019, 22 Ukrainian sailors, 2 SBU officers, and 11 Ukrainian Kremlin political prisoners, Oleh Sentsov, Volodymyr Balukh, Edem Bekirov, Pavlo Hryb, Mykola Karpyuk, Stanislav Klykh, Olexandr Kolchenko, Yevhen and Artur Panovy, Oleksiy Syzonovych, and Roman Sushchenko returned to Ukraine as a result of a reciprocal release operation.

Ukraine International Airlines Flight 752 (PS752) was a scheduled international passenger flight from Tehran to Kyiv operated by Ukraine International Airlines (UIA). On 8 January 2020, the Boeing 737-800 operating the route was shot down shortly after takeoff from Tehran Imam Khomeini International Airport by the Iranian Islamic Revolutionary Guards Corps (IRGC). All 176 passengers and crew were killed.

Poland, Lithuania and Ukraine created the Lublin Triangle initiative, on July 28, 2020, in Lublin, Poland. The aim was to create further cooperation between the three historical countries of the Polish–Lithuanian Commonwealth and further Ukraine's integration and accession to the EU and NATO.

On February 2, 2021, a presidential decree banned the television broadcasting of the pro-Russian TV channels 112 Ukraine, NewsOne, and ZIK. The decision of the National Security and Defense Council and the Presidential Decree of February 19, 2021 imposed sanctions on 8 individuals and 19 legal entities, including Putin's pro-Russian politician and Putin's godfather Viktor Medvedchuk and his wife Oksana Marchenko.

At the June 2021 Brussels Summit, NATO leaders reiterated the decision taken at the 2008 Bucharest Summit that Ukraine would become a member of the Alliance with the Membership Action Plan (MAP) as an integral part of the process and Ukraine's right to determine its own future and foreign policy, of course without outside interference.

On May 17, 2021, the Association Trio was formed by signing a joint memorandum between the Foreign Ministers of Georgia, Moldova, and Ukraine. Association Trio is tripartite format for the enhanced cooperation, coordination, and dialogue between the three countries (that have signed the Association Agreement with the EU) with the European Union on issues of common interest related to European integration, enhancing cooperation within the framework of the Eastern Partnership, and committing to the prospect of joining the European Union. In February 2022, Ukraine applied to join the EU.

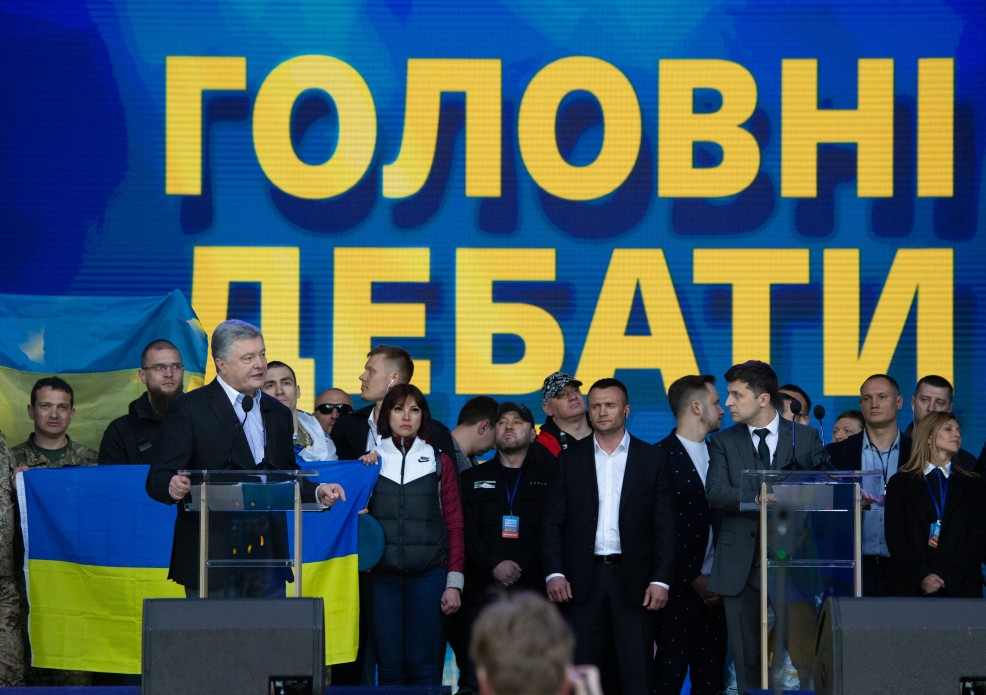
Pre-election debates of Poroshenko and Zelenskyy

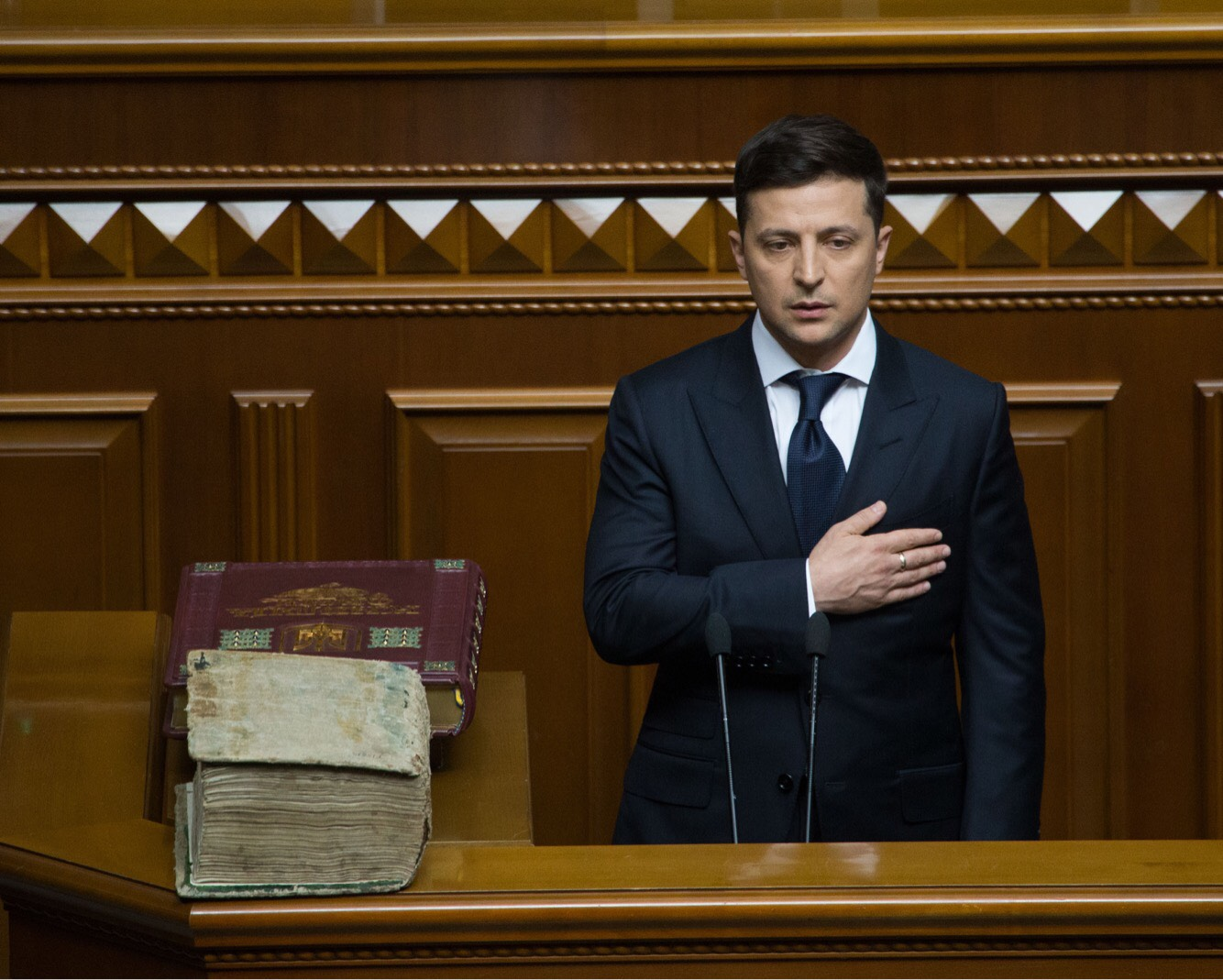
Inauguration of Volodymyr Zelenskyy

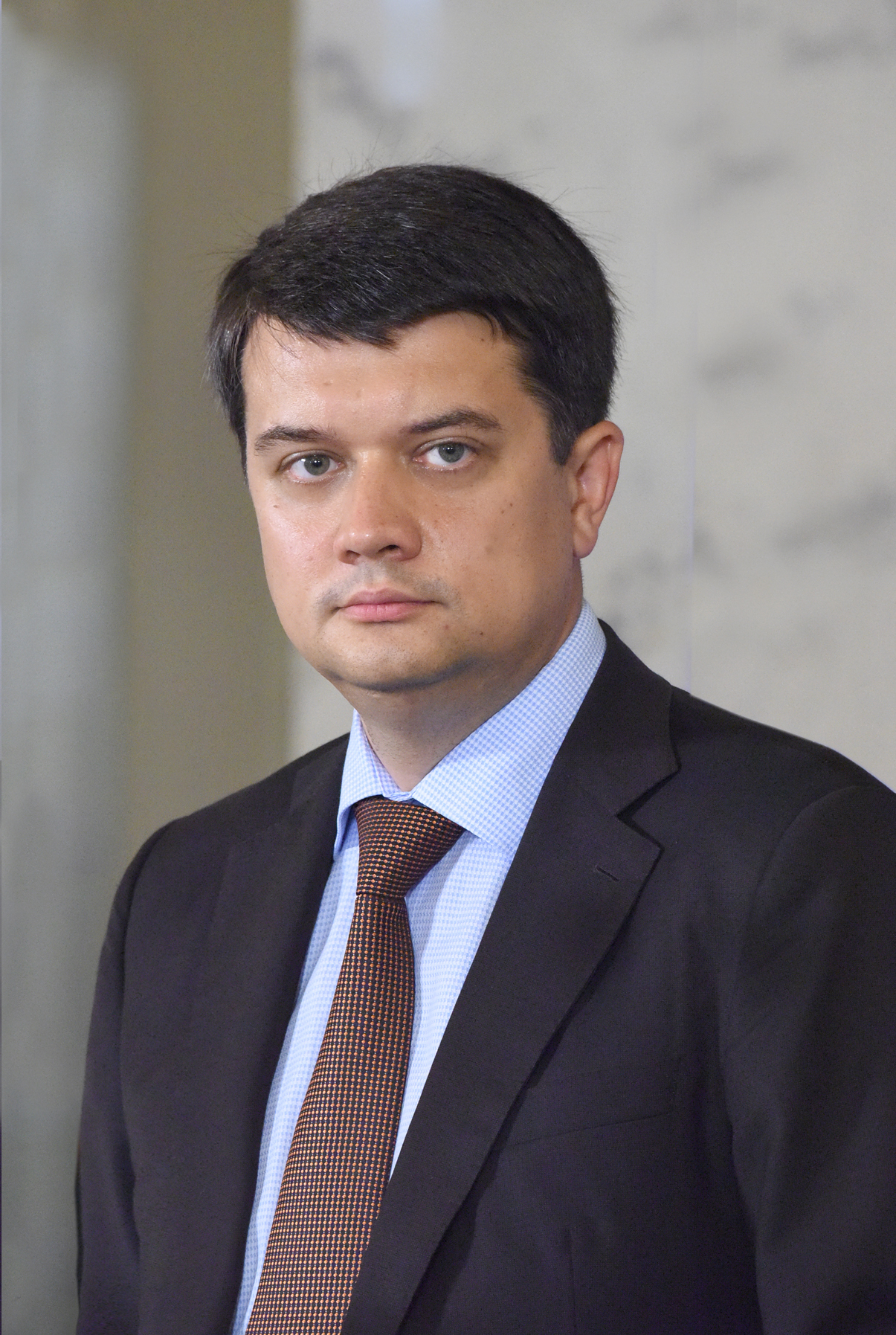
Dmytro Razumkov

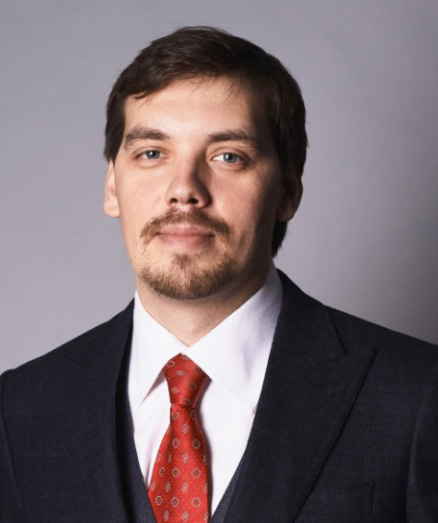
Oleksii Honcharuk

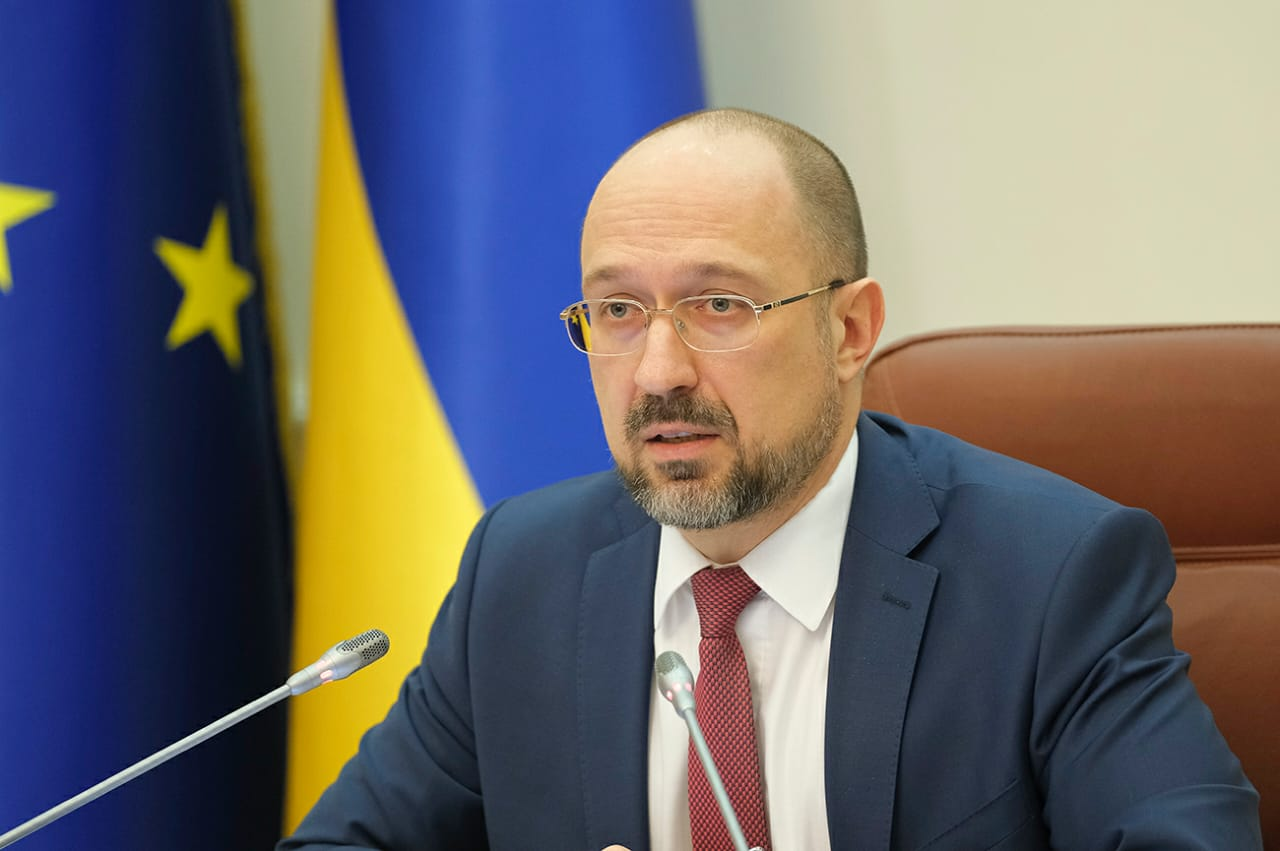
Denys Shmyhal

==== The COVID-19 epidemic ====
On March 2, 2020, the first case of COVID-19 infection was confirmed in Chernivtsi. Subsequently, quarantine was imposed, borders were closed, and a state of emergency was declared. The epidemic covered all regions of Ukraine. Every day, the Ministry of Health publishes new information about the spread of the pandemic. Due to quarantine restrictions in the country, the economic crisis intensified, the number of officially unemployed increased by 67%. On March 20, the first patient was cured, at that time the patients were already in several areas.

On February 23, 2021, two coronavirus vaccines were registered in Ukraine: AstraZeneca and Pfizer–BioNTech. On February 24, the first person was vaccinated.

==== Russian invasion of Ukraine ====
On 24 February 2022, Russia, using its own territory along with the territory of Belarus, invaded Ukraine, after Russian president Vladimir Putin announced a special military operation. In his speech, Putin associated Ukraine with Nazism as a justification for his attack. The invasion was condemned by many countries globally, which resulted in international sanctions against Russia. The invasion also caused the Ukrainian refugee crisis, Europe's largest refugee crisis since WWII. Russia has also been supported by the separatist quasi-states the Donetsk PR and the Luhansk PR. During the early months of the war, Ukraine won multiple upsets against the Russians, winning victories such as the Battle of Kyiv and sinking the flagship of the Russian Black Sea Fleet, the Russian cruiser Moskva. In September 2022, the Ukrainians launched the successful 2022 Kharkiv counteroffensive and 2022 Kherson counteroffensive. Meanwhile, Russia held the 2022 annexation referendums in Russian-occupied Ukraine and officially incorporated Donetsk, Kherson, Luhansk and Zaporizhzhia oblasts into the Russian Federation.

By 2023, the war was marked by trench warfare and attrition. The Ukrainians launched the failed 2023 Ukrainian counteroffensive and lost the Battle of Bakhmut. In 2024, Ukraine lost the Battle of Avdiivka, and despite initial success, withdrew from the Kursk campaign by 2025. Due to the outbreak of the war, the Next Ukrainian presidential election which was scheduled to be held in March or April 2024, has not happened. According to the Ukrainian Constitution, Ukrainian law does not allow presidential elections to be held when martial law is in effect. Martial law has been extended in 90-day intervals since the full-scale invasion with parliament's approval, and has most recently (as of May 2026) been extended for the 19th time until 2 August 2026.

In early 2026, Russia's Pokrovsk offensive succeeded, and Russia began making more assaults towards Kostiantynivka and other cities along Ukraine's Fortress Belt, which Russia had begun targeting since 2025. For the first time since 2024, Ukraine went on the attack by launching the 2026 Ukrainian counteroffensive, which has been marked by the largest Ukrainian gains since their 2023 counteroffensive.

Since the start of the war, there have been numerous attempts for peace negotiations to end the war, but as of 2026, Russia has repeatedly refused calls for a ceasefire. The conflict has been marked by significant foreign support and involvement for both Ukraine and Russia.

== See also ==
- Bibliography of Ukrainian history
