= Anton Basansky =

Russian politician (born 1987)

- Антон Басанский
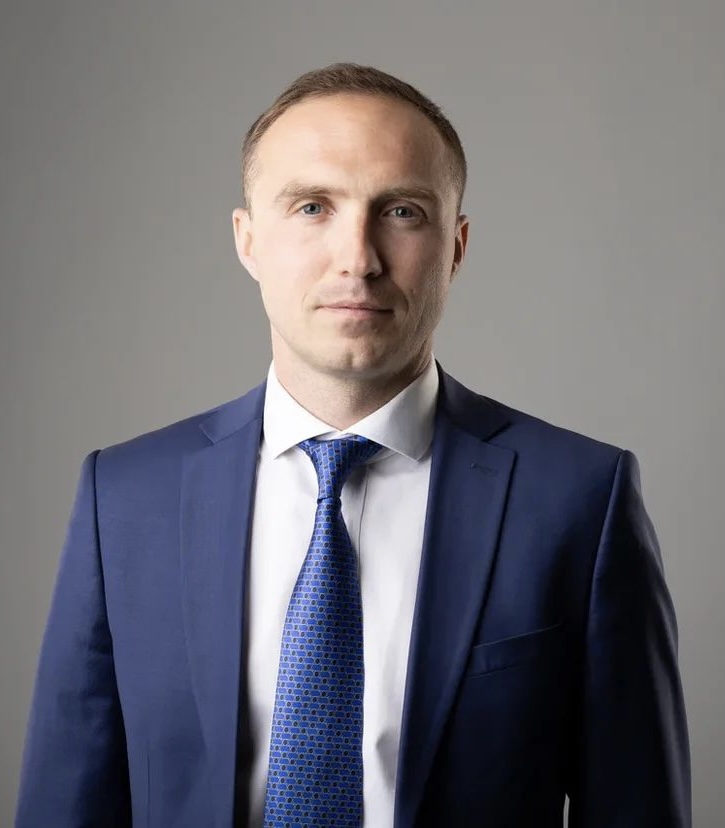

Member of the State Duma for Magadan Oblast
- Incumbent
- Assumed office 12 October 2021
- Preceded by: Oksana Bondar
- Constituency: Magadan-at-large (No. 116)

Personal details
- Born: 9 July 1987 (age 39) Palatka, Magadan Oblast, Russian SFSR, USSR
- Party: United Russia
- Education: Saint Petersburg Mining University; Russian Presidential Academy of National Economy and Public Administration

Anton Alexandrovich Basansky (Russian: Антон Александрович Басанский; born 7 July 1987, Palatka, Magadan Oblast) is a Russian political figure, deputy of the 8th State Duma convocation. His father, Alexander Basansky, is a multibillionaire and takes the fourth place in the Forbes ranking of the hundred Russian civil servants with the highest incomes.

In Anton Basansky 2009 he graduated from the Saint Petersburg Mining University. In 2020 Basansky continued his education at the Russian Presidential Academy of National Economy and Public Administration. From 2015 to 2021, he was a deputy of the Magadan City Duma of the 6th and 7th convocations. In 2016 he was appointed the head of the regional branch of the Young Guard of United Russia. He left this post in 2020 to become a member of the Chamber of Young Legislators under the Federation Council of the Federal Assembly of the Russian Federation.

Since September 2021, he has served as a deputy of the 8th State Duma convocation. He ran with the United Russia. On 12 October 2021 he was also appointed a Deputy Chairman of the State Duma Committee for the Development of the Russian Far East and the Far North.

On March 4, 2025, by order of the Prime Minister of Russia Mikhail Mishustin, he was appointed State Secretary — Deputy Minister of the Russian Federation for the Development of the Far East and the Arctic.

== Sanctions ==
Due to his support of Russian aggression and the violation of Ukraine’s territorial integrity during the Russo-Ukrainian war, Basansky is subject to personal sanctions imposed by various countries, including all member states of the European Union, Canada, the United States, the United Kingdom, Switzerland, Australia, Japan, Ukraine, and New Zealand.
