= Bulychev =

Bulychev or Bulychov (Russian: Булычёв or Булычов, masculine) or Bulycheva or Bulychova (Russian: Булычёва or Булычова, feminine) is a Russian surname originating from the word bulych, which has a range of meanings including shameless, sly, or rough person. The surname may refer to the following notable people:

- Aleksandr Bulychev (born 2001), Belarusian football player
- Bogdan Bulychev (born 1984), Russian explorer, journalist and video blogger
- Kir Bulychev (1934–2003), pen name of Igor Mozheiko, a Soviet science fiction writer, critic, translator and historian

== See also ==
- Yegor Bulychov and Others, a 1953 Soviet drama film
