= Magadan constituency =

Russian legislative constituency

Magadan single-member constituency
- Constituency of the Russian State Duma

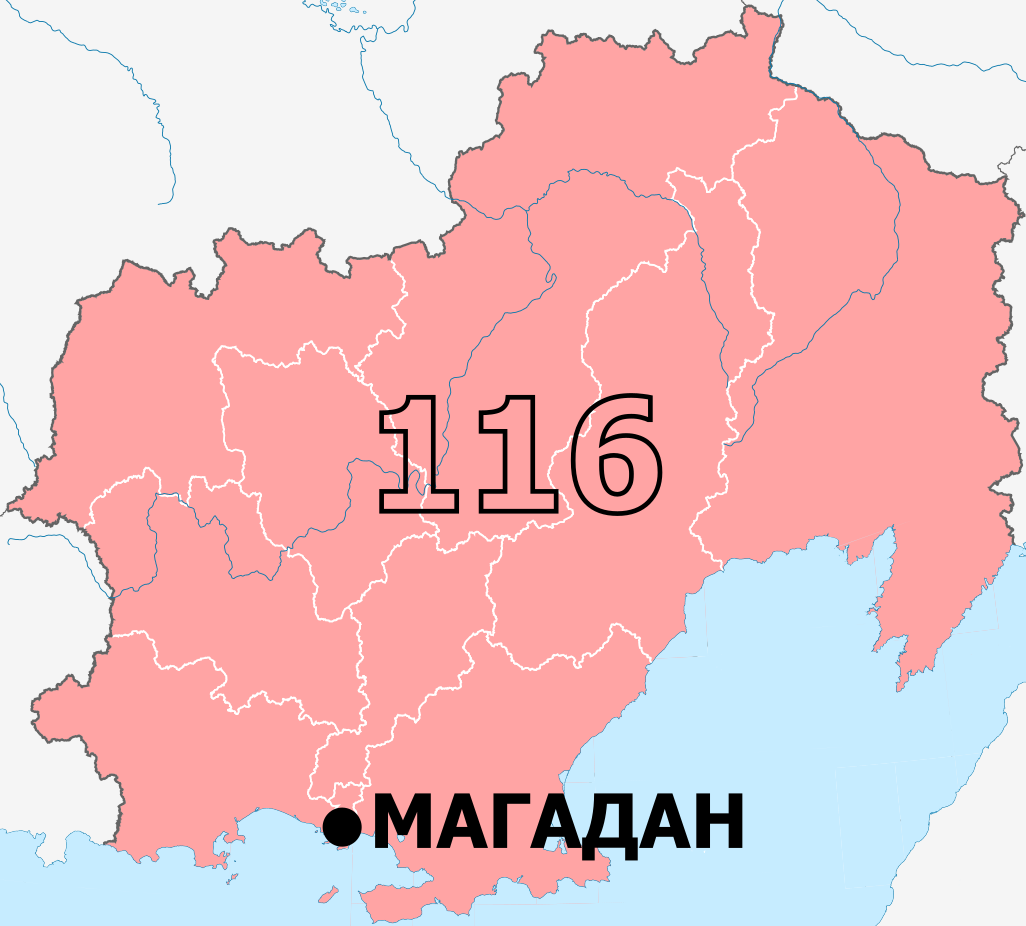
- Deputy: Bogdan Bulychev; United Russia
- Federal subject: Magadan Oblast
- Districts: Khasynsky, Magadan, Olsky, Omsukchansky, Severo-Evensky, Srednekansky, Susumansky, Tenkinsky, Yagodninsky
- Voters: 90,965 (2026)

The Magadan Constituency (No.117 (Note: No.104 in 1993-1995 and 2003-2007, No.103 in 1995-2003, No.116 in 2016–2026)) is a Russian legislative constituency in Magadan Oblast. The constituency encompasses the entire territory of Magadan Oblast.

The constituency has been represented since 2026 by United Russia deputy Bogdan Bulychev, an explorer and video blogger, who won the open seat left vacant following the resignation of one-term United Russia deputy Anton Basansky in March 2025.

== Boundaries ==
1993–2007, 2016–present: Khasynsky District, Magadan, Olsky District, Omsukchansky District, Severo-Evensky District, Srednekansky District, Susumansky District, Tenkinsky District, Yagodninsky District
The constituency has been covering the entirety of Magadan Oblast since its initial creation in 1993.

== Members elected ==
Election	Member	Party
1993	Yevgeny Kokorev	Independent
1995	Valentin Tsvetkov (Note: elected Governor of Magadan Oblast in November 1996)	Independent
1997	Vladimir Butkeyev	Independent
1999	Vladimir Butkeyev	Independent
2003	Stanislav Yeliseykin	United Russia
2007	Proportional representation - no election by constituency	
2011	Proportional representation - no election by constituency	
2016	Oksana Bondar	United Russia
2021	Anton Basansky (Note: appointed Deputy Minister for the Development of the Russian Far East and Arctic in March 2025)	United Russia
2026	Bogdan Bulychev	United Russia

== Election results ==
=== 1993 ===
Summary of the 12 December 1993 Russian legislative election in the Magadan constituency
Candidate	Party	Votes	%
Yevgeny Kokorev	Independent	13,575	15.03%
Bogdan Kobzar	Independent	12,547	13.89%
Vladimir Pekhtin	Independent	11,707	12.96%
Yevgeny Lyukhatan	Independent	9,778	10.82%
Nikolay Lastenkov	Yavlinsky–Boldyrev–Lukin	6,582	7.29%
Boris Levin	Choice of Russia	4,280	4.74%
against all		26,496	29.33%
Total		90,349	100%

=== 1995 ===
Summary of the 17 December 1995 Russian legislative election in the Magadan constituency
Candidate	Party	Votes	%
Valentin Tsvetkov	Independent	42,100	42,52%
Valery Bagrov	Liberal Democratic Party	10,341	10.44%
Nina Shcherbak	Independent	9,903	10.00%
Valery Brayko	Independent	5,759	5.82%
Igor Yurov	Communist Party	5,476	5.53%
Vladimir Yudin	Independent	4,927	4.98%
Yevgeny Kokorev (incumbent)	Ivan Rybkin Bloc	3,302	3.34%
Aleksandr Aleksandrov	Congress of Russian Communities	2,302	2.33%
Georgy Zhzhonov	Democratic Choice of Russia – United Democrats	1,967	1.99%
Nikolay Lastenkov	Yabloko	1,782	1.80%
Svetlana Kachemayeva	Independent	1,454	1.47%
Vladimir Barlyayev	Our Home – Russia	834	0.84%
Anton Kaminsky	Independent	488	0.49%
against all		8,373	8.40%
Total		99,858	100%

=== 1997 ===
Summary of the 18 May 1997 Russian by-election in the Magadan single-member constituency
Candidate	Party	Votes	%
Vladimir Butkeyev	Independent	10,200	13.97%
Aleksandr Aleksandrov	Independent	8,862	12.14%
Vladimir Pekhtin	Independent	8,437	11.56%
Aleksandr Rybak	Independent	5,144	7.05%
Tanya Karatsuba	Independent	4,251	5.82%
Valery Bagrov	Independent	3,996	5.47%
Viktor Kruglov	Independent	2,827	3.87%
Vladimir Goloyad	Independent	2,619	3.59%
Sergey Roshchin	Independent	2,467	3.38%
Svetlana Kachemayeva	Independent	2,283	3.13%
Yury Davydenko	Independent	1,923	2.63%
Yury Glukhov	Independent	1,450	1.99%
Boris Khaydakin	Independent	1,015	1.39%
Vladimir Kiyan	Independent	924	1.27%
against all		13,451	18.43%
Total		72,997	100%
Eligible voters/turnout		163,631	44.61%

=== 1999 ===
Summary of the 19 December 1999 Russian legislative election in the Magadan constituency
Candidate	Party	Votes	%
Vladimir Butkeyev (incumbent)	Independent	34,245	38.93%
Aleksandr Aleksandrov	Independent	7,836	8.91%
Vladislav Goncharov	Communist Party	7,110	8.08%
Yury Kuznetsov	Liberal Democratic Party	5,588	6.35%
Aleksandr Basansky	Independent	5,495	6.25%
Vladimir Yudin	Independent	5,094	5.79%
Vyacheslav Kobets	Independent	4,291	4.88%
Yevgeny Kokorev	Independent	2,658	3.02%
Ivan Syrbu	Independent	2,537	2.88%
Yury Bilibin	Independent	2,191	2.49%
Vladimir Serbinov	Independent	1,943	2.21%
against all		8,144	9.26%
Total		87,972	100%

=== 2003 ===
Summary of the 7 December 2003 Russian legislative election in the Magadan constituency
Candidate	Party	Votes	%
Stanislav Yeliseykin	United Russia	26,146	36.31%
Vladimir Butkeyev (incumbent)	Independent	24,589	34.15%
Yelena Vyalbe	Russian Pensioners' Party-Party of Social Justice	5,257	7.30%
Yury Davydenko	Communist Party	3,213	4.46%
Yury Grishan	Liberal Democratic Party	2,926	4.06%
Anatoly Shestayev	Independent	820	1.14%
Artur Suleymenov	Independent	754	1.05%
Nina Stepanenko	Rodina	744	1.03%
Tatyana Bagalova	Party of Russia's Rebirth-Russian Party of Life	735	1.02%
Sergey Tyaglov	Yabloko	412	0.57%
Sabina Strelchenko	Independent	346	0.48%
against all		5,359	7.44%
Total		72,003	100%

=== 2016 ===
Summary of the 18 September 2016 Russian legislative election in the Magadan constituency
Candidate	Party	Votes	%
Oksana Bondar	United Russia	19,668	46.49%
Sergey Ivanitsky	Communist Party	6,252	14.78%
Roman Isayev	Liberal Democratic Party	5,863	13.86%
Igor Novikov	A Just Russia	4,654	11.00%
Yury Davydenko	Communists of Russia	2,571	6.07%
Pavel Zhukov	Yabloko	1,306	3.09%
Total		42,308	100%

=== 2021 ===
Summary of the 17–19 September 2021 Russian legislative election in the Magadan constituency
Candidate	Party	Votes	%
Anton Basansky	United Russia	21,487	54.30%
Aleksey Popov	Communist Party	7,770	19.64%
Roman Isayev	Liberal Democratic Party	3,332	8.42%
Snezhana Gakhramanova	A Just Russia — For Truth	2,860	7.23%
Yury Davydenko	Communists of Russia	2,552	6.45%
Total		39,572	100%

=== 2026 ===
Summary of the 18-20 September 2026 Russian legislative election in the Magadan constituency
Candidate	Party	Votes	%
Bogdan Bulychev	United Russia	23,004	49.27%
Sergey Goncharenko	Communist Party	8,789	18.82%
Roman Isayev	Liberal Democratic Party	5,667	12.14%
Kirill Ettenko	New People	4,864	10.42%
Oleg Prikoki	A Just Russia	3,241	6.94%
Total		46,688	100%
