= Anti-Maidan =

Decentralised groups opposed to Euromaidan

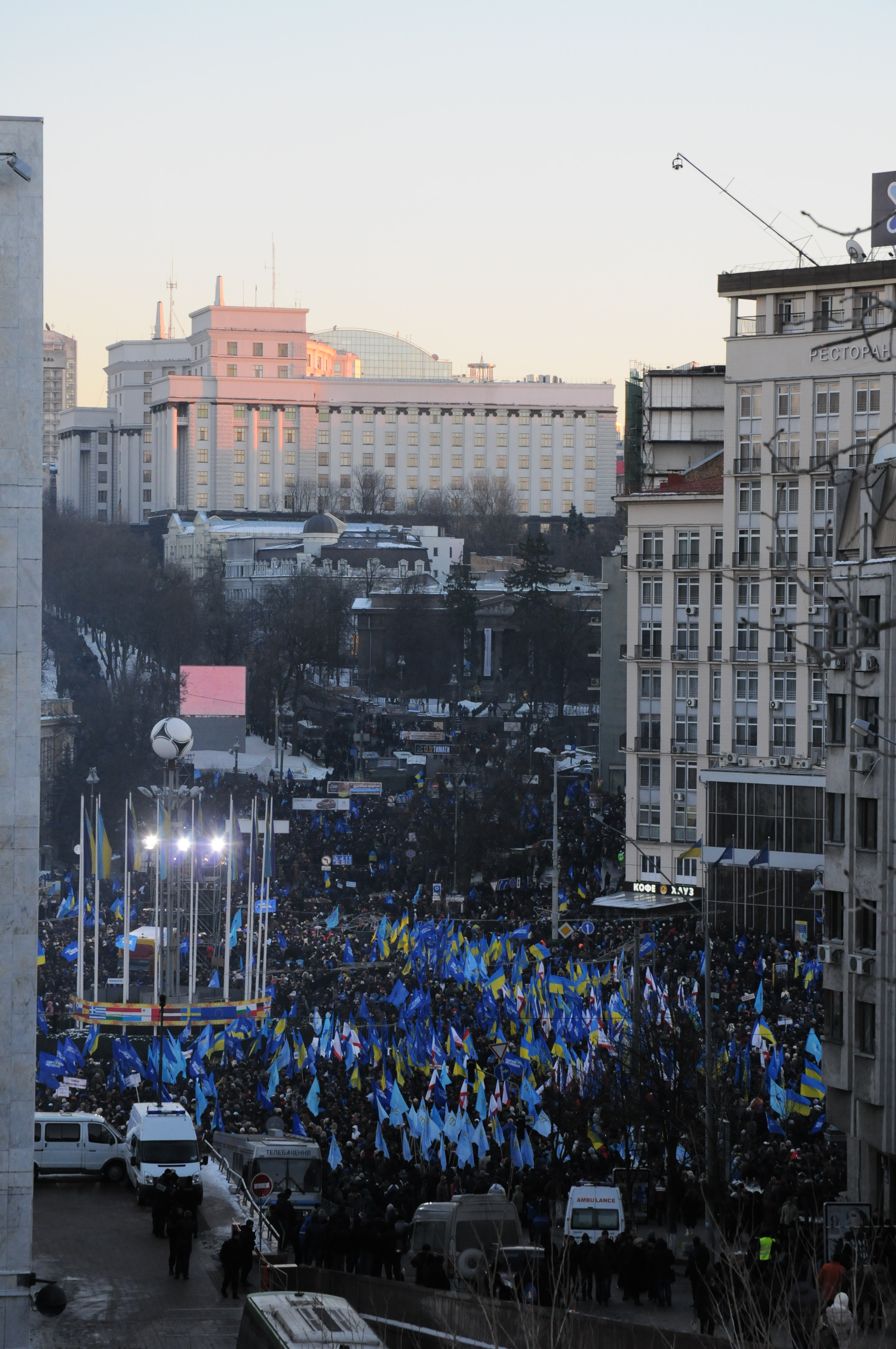
Anti-Maidan in Kyiv, 14 December 2013

Anti-Maidan (Ukrainian: Антимайда́н, romanized: Antymaidan; Russian: Антимайдан, romanized: Antimaydan) is a collective term of reference for groups opposed to Euromaidan, the Revolution of Dignity and the post-Revolution of Dignity Ukrainian government, and favouring improved relations with Russia, either through political reforms to transform Ukraine into a federation or through Russian annexation of Ukraine. Anti-Maidan protesters played a key role in the 2014 pro-Russian unrest in Ukraine and the subsequent Russo-Ukrainian war, forming a part of the Russian separatist forces.

Anti-Maidan initially formed as a fringe group sponsored by the government of president Viktor Yanukovych against Euromaidan protesters. Following the Revolution of Dignity in February 2014 and the overthrow of Yanukovych, Anti-Maidan expanded in size, primarily spreading over social media. Anti-Maidan protesters lacked a common ideology beyond Russophilia and Soviet nostalgia; supporters included Russian nationalists, supporters of federalism and Russian separatists.

== Protests of Anti-Maidan by date ==
=== November 2013 rallies ===
A pro-government counter protest reportedly gathered 10,000 people on 25 November. The Party of Regions allegedly paid ₴100 to its supporters to participate in a three-hour rally, with supporters calling for "building Europe in Ukraine [...] but on terms and conditions favourable for Ukraine". According to the Kyiv Post, demonstrators held anti-EU and homophobic banners. On 29 November, a two-hour pro-government rally attended by 3,000 people took place on European Square. Party of Regions member of parliament Vladyslav Lukianov told the crowd: "I'm sure that our movement to Europe will never change. We support this choice. Let the land shatter from our steps. Together we will win". The Kyiv Post again reported incentives were given to attend and described attendants in appearance "to be homeless; still more look drunk. The crowd consists mostly of men". Euronews spoke of many being "bused in from the east of the country where pro-Russian sentiment is strong. They, too, carried national flags as well as those of the ruling Party of Regions". Many in the crowd refused to talk to Euronews.

On 30 November, several thousand protesters had been brought into Kharkiv on buses to stage a rally to support the government on Freedom Square. Some 170 buses were reported on the scene, and the number of attendees was according to organisers allegedly over 70,000; news agencies reported the size of the crowd to be 40,000. The event lasted only 1 hour. Reports indicated attendees were paid ₴50 to attend, and reports indicated that many were public sector workers who did not attend on their own accord. The rally was both pro-administration and pro-European Integration.

A rally in support of President Yanukovych held by the Donetsk Regional State Administration and the Party of Regions was to be held in Donetsk on 2 December, but was cancelled due to failure to organise enough people.

On 3 December, 1,000 attended a rally in Kyiv put on by the Party of Regions to support the president. The same day, it was reported by journalists of Espreso.tv that a Party of Regions organised rally in Kyiv was paying ₴200 to participants via online job postings.

On 4 December, 15,000 rallied in Donetsk in support of the president, many of whom were bussed in. The Party of Regions denied any allegations of forcing anyone to attend.

=== December 2013 rallies in Mariinskyi Park ===
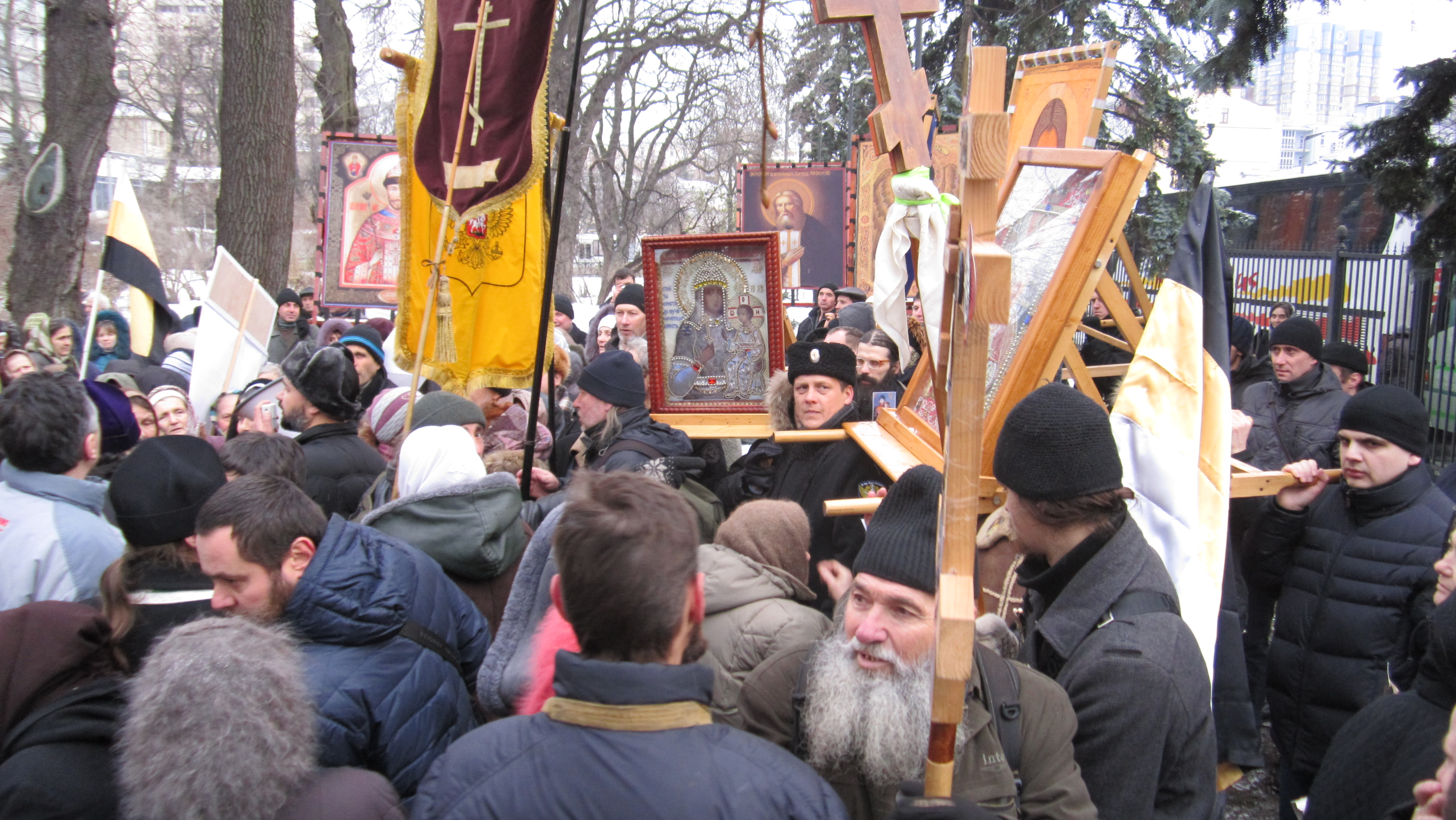
Russian Orthodox Anti-Maidan protesters waving Imperial Russian flags and orthodox banners

A rally and tent camp action in support of President Viktor Yanukovych and at initiative of the Party of Regions began on 3 December in Mariinskyi Park located close by the Verkhovna Rada building (the parliament). The Party of Regions's press service reported on Sunday 6 December that over 15,000 people were taking part in a pro-government rally there. According to city police, there were some 3,000 people in the park the day before., and the press estimated them at 2,000. Police heavily guarded this event from not only anti-government protesters, but also from any journalists and on-lookers.

According to Segodnya, people attending the pro-government Mariinskyi Park event were hired or obliged to attend, and forced to stay for a pre-determined time. In one incident on 8 December, protesters were held at the rally against their will by armed security.

Speaking on condition of anonymity to the Kyiv Post, one demonstrator said that participants of the rally are paid ₴300 or more in order to earn money without going to work. She also recalled cases when they were not let outside the rally for the whole day, while inside the camp there was a build up of garbage and dirty toilets on the grounds. Mark MacKinnon, senior international correspondent for The Globe and Mail, attempted to interview a demonstrator at the ongoing Anti-Maidan, but although was refused the demonstrator indicated to him that she actually supported the Euromaidan protests.

In parliament on 13 December Svoboda leader Oleh Tyahnybok said people on the government payroll in medical, education and other sectors (the so-called "byudzhetnye" sectors) were being bullied into coming to a planned pro-government rally that weekend; Speaker of parliament and Party of Regions member Volodymyr Rybak responded, saying that it is wrong to pressure people and it has to stop.

On 23 December, the pro-government rally ended.

=== 14–15 December 2013 rally in European Square ===
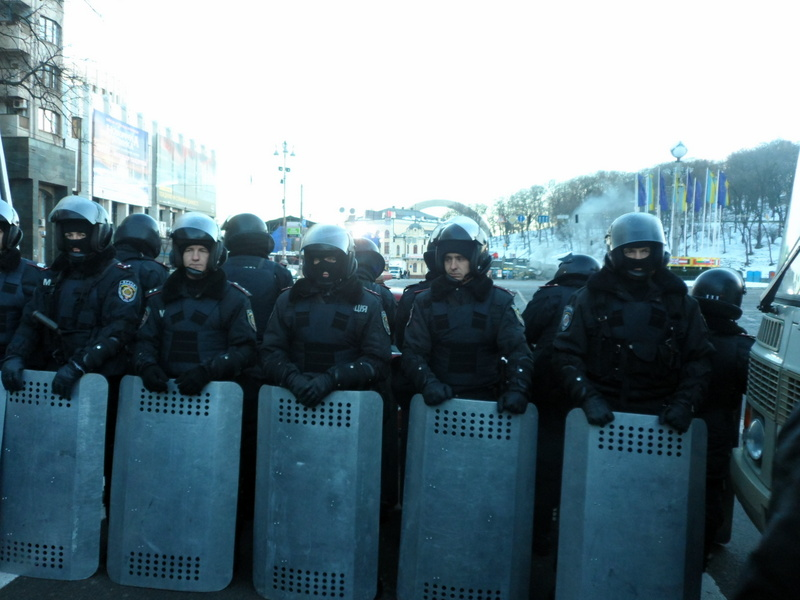
Police guard the entrance to the 'Anti-Maidan' demonstration site on European Square, Kyiv, on the morning of 14 December.

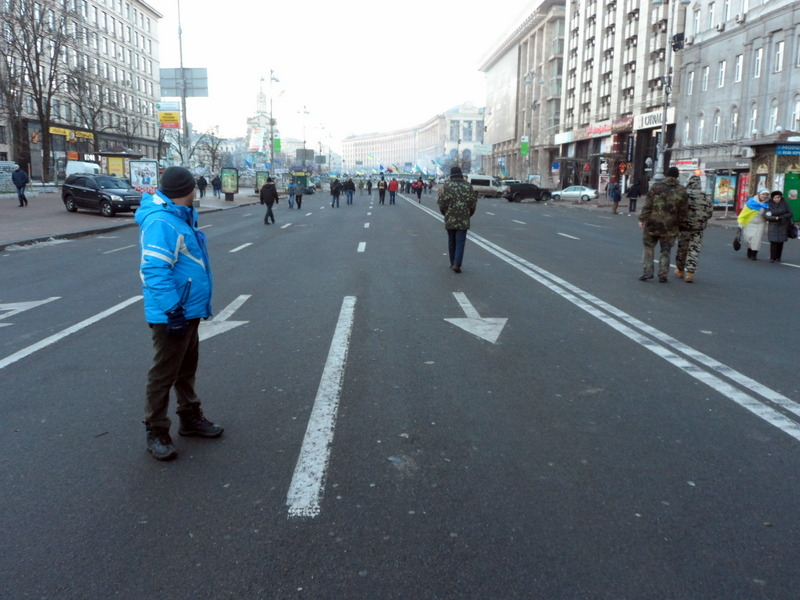
The 'corridor' on Khreshchatyk between the Euromaidan and 'Anti-Maidan' demonstrations, looking towards Maidan Nezalezhnosti, 8:00 am, 14 December

On 14 December the Party of Regions announced that they intended to hold a rally on European Square under the banner "Let's Save Ukraine". The move to create a second rally in the city by officials was condemned by former president Leonid Kravchuk. According to party officials, 20,000 were expected to come from Donetsk and 10,000 from Dnipropetrovsk Oblast. Many others were expected to arrive from the Crimea, Odesa Oblast, and a number of other regions. In the lead up to the rally, it was reported on 12 December that "thousands" of residents from Dnipropetrovsk (mostly government employees, students of technical schools, and athletes) were traveling to Kyiv to join in the pro-government rallies. Those interviewed said they were doing so reluctantly, and only for two days, at a rate of ₴400–500 a day. It was also reported that state employees were coerced to join the group under threat of dismissal. On the day of the rally, UDAR MP Roman Chereha accused officials of bringing in children from shelters, promising them food and shelter. On 13 December, the Donetsk regional organisation of The Party of Regions said that people wishing to go to Kyiv would be provided food rations and would be transported on a specially commissioned train, paid for by the party. In Odesa, several trains carrying roughly 3,000 departed the city carrying students and teachers to participate in the pro-government rally; students, some from the Odesa Law Academy, admitted they would receive school credit for attending; others would receive financial compensation. It was similarly reported in Luhansk that over 1,000 had departed via rail, and those attending were largely coal miners from the region. Luhansk mayor Sergei Kravchenko in an address stated that over 1,500 residents would support the government at the rally. Meanwhile, in Zaporizhzhia, it was reported that a train packed with 1,600 "athletic men and workers of state enterprises and companies" was departing to Kyiv. Conductors said it was a private, rented train with tickets not available to the public. In a list released by journalist Tatiana Honchenko, a total of 27 trains, each with on average 20 cars had been rented by the Party of Regions for the weekend event to transport supporters from across Ukraine to Kyiv.

Opposition leaders Arseniy Yatseniuk and Ihor Miroshnychenko issued a warning, citing inside information, that authorities were planning to use the large pro-government rally in order to start a civil conflict and justify issuing a state of emergency, which would require the use of Berkut riot police and military to clear European Square and Maidan. Yatsenyuk specifically warned against the use of hired thugs (titushky) who will infiltrate and start to wreak havoc in the pro-European encampment cloaked in either European Union or national colours. Opposition leader Yuriy Lutsenko, however, called for calm and assured that the pro-government rally will be attended by peaceful, state-paid employees and students. Oleksandr Yefremov, head of the Party of Regions parliamentary faction reiterated: "This will be an exclusively peaceful demonstration, our people are always easy to get along with ... we will also rely on the police to create a safe buffer between the two rallies". However, a statement by Party of Regions MP Vadym Kolesnichenko acknowledged the creation of vigilante groups being formed in the south-east of Ukraine and across Crimea to "protect public order and the Constitution", and that one such group in Sevastopol already had already amassed 800 recruits; adding that they would be involved in the events of the weekend. In an interview by Radio Free Europe/Radio Liberty with an attendee on the day of the event, the subject (who taught boxing) revealed that he and a group of others were offered ₴1,000 by organisers to instigate a fight with protesters on Maidan.

The Interior Ministry's press service told the Kyiv Post on 13 December that the pro-government rally received permission to have up to 200,000 in attendance. According to Zerkalo Nedeli, one of the nation's most influential newspapers, the National Security and Defense Council of Ukraine and government ordered the Ministry of Defense to aid in the provision of security, logistics, deployment of field kitchens, and transportation of 200,000 civilians to hold a pro-government rally in Kyiv on the weekend of 14–15 December. The Ministry of Internal Affairs is said to have been requested to aid in the security for those coming to Kyiv from other regions of the country. The report was covered in the media by The Insider, UNIAN, and Ukrayinska Pravda. The Minister of Defense later denied these rumors, citing Article 17 and Article 37 of the Ukrainian Constitution, which prohibits the participation of the Ukrainian Armed Forces in domestic political fights. Despite this, on 13 December tents were seen being set up on property owned by the Ministry of Defense, and in a separate report by Zerkalo Nedeli it was revealed that the Ministry of Defense had been conducting training exercises over the previous two days, including taking inventory of equipment (ex. field kitchens, vehicles) for support of the pro-governmental protests. Resources were also transferred to Ukpromakord, the food supplier of the Ukrainian Armed Forces. Further, on the day of the event witnesses reported and photographed 40 military field kitchens serving pro-government supporters in Mariinskyi Park.

Prime Minister Mykola Azarov spoke at the rally and told attendants that Ukraine did not decline its goal of integrating to the EU: "We're allegedly betray Ukraine and sign [the agreement on joining] the Customs Union of Belarus, Kazakhstan, and Russia. I strongly deny these speculations". He referred to statements that Ukrainian authorities were planning to join this Customs Union as "profiteering". Azarov also urged, "Don't divide Ukraine, don't build barricades". Azarov also said the EU had insisted on 'unacceptable conditions' sign the AA, including the introduction of gay marriage and laws protecting sexual minorities. "The opposition leaders are telling fables when they say that we only have to sign the [association] agreement [with the EU] to start traveling to Europe visa-free the next day. Nothing of the sort. We have yet to comply with a whole set of preconditions: we have to legalise same-sex marriages, we have to adopt legislation on equality of sexual minorities, and so on. Is our society ready for this?" Azarov said. Azarov has subsequently decamped to Vienna, where he maintains a palatial home.

At the event, Party of Regions MP Hryhoriy Smitiukh called attendees to appeal to Russian president Vladimir Putin to lower the price of gas in Ukraine, and engaged the crowd in a chant of "Putin! Putin!"

Organisers claimed over 100,000 attended; police estimated 60,000 attended, which was also estimated to be the maximum capacity of the square; eyewitnesses placed the attendance as low as 20,000. At 6:00 p.m. Party of Regions head Oleksandr Efremov announced the end of the meeting, a day earlier than planned. By the end of the rally, only 3,000 remained, and by the evening European Square was deserted.

The rally on 15 December ran from 10:00 a.m. to 4:00 p.m., and there were various reports that attendees were not paid in full for their time. "People came to express their will. We paid them Hr 300 per day. I did not promise any money to them, I am here with my voters," said Artur Martovytskiy, a lawmaker from the Party of Regions.

=== January 2014 rally in Mariinskyi park ===
Another rally by supporters of the Party of Regions began on 13 January 2014 and continued until the adoption of the state budget for 2014 on 17 January. According to the organisers people are attending the rally because they want "stability in the country" and believe that it is unacceptable to hinder the adoption of the state budget. Protesters are planning to spend the night in the tent city in Mariinskyi Park. According to the organisers participants in the rally were collecting signatures that will be sent to the Kyiv city council with the request to free the center of Kyiv of demonstrators, including Khreshchatyk and Maidan Nezalezhnosti. The organisers stated that the protesters were in favour of a peaceful solution to this issue and were against the violent dispersal of the pro-European rally. Interfax-Ukraine reported on 13 January that about ten tents had been set up in the park and metal shields had been installed perpendicular to Hrushevskoho Street, with law enforcement officers standing behind them.

Prime Minister Azarov criticised Euromaidan coverage in western media, and lack of attention to the 'anti-Maidan', "The Western media are paying attention to one square and do not pay for another," and said that the anti-maidan represents all of Ukraine, whereas Euromaidan as a whole only represents Lviv, Ternopil, and Ivano-Frankivsk. He then stated that the majority of Ukraine supports the president, the government, and no longer has interest in European integration.

Another rally by supporters of the Party of Regions (planned to bring up to 10,000 attendees) in Mariinskyi Park began on 21 January 2014 against an alleged attempted "coup" by the Euromaidan protesters. It is planned to continue until the end of the 2014 Hrushevskoho Street riots.

== Other “anti-Maidans” ==
On 25 January, a pro-government antimaidan was held in Mykolaiv, with attendees largely described as mostly young men, athletic, and appearing to be titushky. The crowd of 400 spoke out against fascism and held signs promoting the unity of Ukraine, Belarus, and Russia.

The Communist Party of Ukraine planned to gather 2,000 supporters to a 24 November 2013 rally against signing agreements with the European Union. Communists who attended set up tents near the statue of Lenin in Kyiv, intending to protect it from vandalism.

On 25 November in Sevastopol the Russian Bloc and the Communist Party of Ukraine organised an "antimaidan". The meeting was conducted in support of joining the Customs Union of Belarus, Kazakhstan, and Russia. Previous rallies by the Russian Bloc in the weeks prior included EU flag burning and anti-government, and anti-Ukrainian rhetoric, (Note: These rallies were described by Batkivshchyna MP Volodymyr Yavorivsky as "raving madness".) On 26 November, another antimaidan protest was organised in Donetsk, attracting only 30 student protesters. Organisers stated that the European Union had ruined the economies of new members, and that joining would bring corruption and gay marriage. The protest was counter to the pro-EU EuroMaidan protest 200 meters away, which attracted no more than 50 protesters. The next day, a small antimaidan rally was held by the Russian Bloc and Communists in Mykolaiv. At a 25 November rally in Luhansk, protesters were met with resistance from a group of Don Cossacks, who were against EU membership and referred to pro-EU protesters as fascists.

On 1 December, a Communist rally in Donetsk gathered about 200 mostly elderly supporters who chanted: "The union of Ukraine, Russia and Belarus is inevitable". The following day, Communist Party of Ukraine MP Antonina Khromova made statements at the Donetsk Oblast Council, approving the use of force to remove protesters in Kyiv, which was met with applause. She continued by saying that Ukraine does not need European values, namely, "same-sex marriage" and "African panhandlers".

The Sevastopol City Council, on the initiative of the Russian Bloc, opted to appeal to the President and the Government of Ukraine to reorient foreign policy towards Russia and its Customs Union. The Russian Bloc has also demanded the resignation of Minister of Education Dmytro Tabachnyk, for not preventing students from taking part in the Euromaidan protests. On 8 December, the "Russian Community of Sevastopol" organisation held a rally in support of Berkut anti-riot troops who made headlines for assaulting students and journalists in Kyiv the week prior. Leader of the group, Tatiana Ermakova, expressed outrage at the fact that, according to her, protesters provoked and attacked Berkut troops. "No country in the world would allow such lawlessness which, for the 17th day occurs on the Maidan," she said. The official statement from Russian Community specifically thanked the anti-riot troops for 'protecting us from the fascists', and called the Euromaidan demonstrators "Nazis" and "Banderites".

On 14 December the leaders of the Russian Bloc and Russian Unity met with the Consul General of Russia in Crimea, Vyacheslav Svitlychny, and declared the preparation of an antimaidan to demand the secession of Crimea from Ukraine.

On 26 January 2014, 1,000 people gathered in Donetsk, supported by local Regions supporters, communists, and Russian Cossacks; clashes caused some injuries.

In January 2015, an Anti-Maidan movement in Russia said it was ready to use violence to stop anti-government and pro-democracy protesters.

== Criticism ==
Anton Shekhovtsov described anti-maidan as “a top-down initiative with protesters sometimes receiving remuneration for their participation”, alleging that the movement was not organic in nature and was supportive of the authoritarian government of Viktor Yanukovych. Several news outlets investigated the claims to confirm that by and large, attendees at pro-government rallies did so for financial compensation and not for political reasons, and were not an organic response to the Euromaidan. "People stand at Euromaidan protesting against the violation of human rights in the state, and they are ready to make sacrifices," said Oleksiy Haran, a political scientist at Kyiv Mohyla Academy in Kyiv. "People at Antimaidan stand for money only. The government uses these hirelings to provoke resistance. They won't be sacrificing anything."

Ukrainian linguist Svetlana Zhabotynskaya opined that a considerable share of people in the regions was "controlled by the Donetsk Clans" who capitalized on the population's grave economic situation, that the author actually considers a result of the rule of said (oligarch) clans. Common people there had had few genuine encounters with the democratic world and fell victim to "foreign history: myths about "fascists", "Banderites", "Gayrope", "kike-NATO" and "Pindosia". According to her, "these myths made them go to the Anti-Maidan so as to defend Yanukovich first and thereafter stand up for the Russkiy mir".

== After the Revolution of Dignity ==
After the overthrow of Viktor Yanukovych in the Revolution of Dignity, the anti-Maidan movement split into different, but sometimes overlapping movements, encompassing protest groups mobilised by social grievances, supporters of federalisation in Ukraine, and Russian separatists. After the success of the Revolution of Dignity, “anti-Maidan” movements continued in southern and eastern Ukraine, where “anti-Maidan” movements engaged in clashes with pro-Maidan demonstrators. These clashes during the pro-Russian unrest ongoing in these regions erupted into violence, such as the 2014 Odesa clashes, eventually escalating into the Russo-Ukrainian War. By 2015, a pro-separatist social movement had emerged in Russia called “Anti-Maidan”, consisting of pro-Russian, (often high-profile) Ukrainians who left for Russia in the wake of the Revolution of Dignity.

Successors to the “anti-Maidan” movement included:

- Ukrainskiy Front, the main successor of Anti-Maidan that replaced the movement and united all its branches
  - Odesskaya Druzhina, an Odesa city branch
  - Oplot, a Kharkiv city branch
  - Oplot Donbassa (later - Russkaya Pravoslavnaya Armiya), a Donetsk city branch
  - Armiya Yuga-Vostoka, a Luhansk city branch

== See also ==
- 2014 Euromaidan regional state administration occupations
- Anti-Maidan (Russia)
- Soviet imagery during the Russo-Ukrainian War
