= Anti-Maidan (Russia) =

Anti-Maidan Антимайдан
- Co-chairs: Alexander Zaldostanov; Nikolai Starikov; Julia Berezikova; Dmitry Sablin; Anton Demidov
- Founded: 15 January 2015; 11 years ago
- Headquarters: Moscow, Russia
- Ideology: Russian nationalism Okhranitelstvo; Russian irredentism Anti-Maidan; Anti-Americanism; Anti-liberalism; Hard euroscepticism
- Political position: Big tent
- National affiliation: United Russia
- Allies: Great Fatherland Party; National Liberation Movement; Civic Platform
- Colours: Black; Orange
- Slogan: «We don't need great shocks, we need Great Russia!» (Russian: «Нам не нужны великие потрясения, нам нужна Великая Россия!»)

Website
- antimaidan.ru

The Anti-Maidan (Russian: Антимайдан; Antimaydan) is a Russian social movement created in 2015. It opposes the Maidan Revolution, named after the movement of the same name, which fought against Euromaidan in Ukraine.

== History ==
January 15, 2015, at the press conference "Challenges of our time: revolutions, illegal actions; how to protect your country from collapse", the head of the biker club Night Wolves Alexander Zaldostanov, member of the Federation Council Dmitry Sablin and mixed martial arts fighter Julia Berezikova initiated the creation of the Russian movement "Anti-Maidan", the purpose of which is to "counter illegal attempts to overthrow the current government in the manner of Ukrainian Euromaidan". The movement has a non-partisan status and does not imply either funding or fixed membership. The movement was co-chaired by writer Nikolai Starikov, Alexander Zaldostanov, Dmitry Sablin and Julia Berezikova. Anton Demidov was also elected co-chairman in February 2016.

The first official event of the movement was the action on January 15 at Manezhnaya Square in Moscow, where representatives of the non-system opposition gathered.

On February 21, 2015, the movement organized a rally in commemoration of the first anniversary of the change of power in Ukraine under the slogan "There will be no Maidan in Russia." The event was attended by the movement "Officers of Russia", "Combat Brotherhood", Cossacks, representatives of youth movements, members of the party "Civic Platform". The Ministry of Internal Affairs estimated the number of people gathered up to 35,000 people, the organizers announced 50,000. The media reported about the gathering of participants with the help of an administrative resource from the presidential administration and for a cash payment of 300 rubles, Anti-Maidan denied this.

In June 2015, the Anti-Maidan-Analytics project was launched, within the framework of which Russian and foreign experts will study the mechanisms of color revolutions The presentation of the project took place in Moscow at the DI Telegraf site. The event was attended by Doctor of Political Sciences, Director of the Institute for Strategic Studies and Forecasts of the RUDN University, Professor Georgy Filimonov, American journalist and analyst Andrew Korybko, lecturer at the Department of Applied Analysis and International Issues at MGIMO, an expert in branding and positioning Alexander Stikhin, as well as co-chairman of the movement "Anti-Maidan" Nikolai Starikov

Since 2015, the National Liberation Movement of the deputy from United Russia Yevgeny Fyodorov and the Federation of Independent Trade Unions of Russia have collaborated with Anti-Maidan.

In the 2016 parliamentary elections, representatives of Anti-Maidan stood as candidates for United Russia. In Moscow, Senator Dmitry Sablin won the Novomoskovsky single-mandate constituency (first, in the United Russia primaries); in the Nizhny Tagil single-mandate constituency, the deputy head of the Tagil branch of the movement "In Defense of Labor" and a member of the Uralvagonzavod trade union Alexei Balyberdin.

== Ideology ==
The main ideological principles in accordance with which the organization carries out its activities are formulated in the Manifesto of the Anti-Maidan movement.

The goals of the movement were called:

- Avoiding the implementation of color revolutions, chaos and anarchy,
- Protection of the constitutional order and law, traditional values of society and the future of the country,
- Tracking the actions of protesters,
- Preventing the implementation of the violent and forceful overthrow of the legally elected government.

== Activities ==
In July 2015, members of Anti-Maidan held a series of pickets against the participation in regional elections of parties representing non-systemic opposition. Members of the movement committed provocations against opposition activists and politicians.

They also participated in a clash with opponents of the installation of a Monument to Vladimir the Great in Moscow. In 2015, we held a series of single pickets in St. Petersburg, protesting in connection with the planned visit of Mustafa Nayyem to the cultural capital. Almost 2 hours after the start of the action, there was an official statement from the organizers of the discussion club "Dialogues" that Mustafa Nayyem would not take part in the scheduled discussion and would not come to Russia.

The movement supported the special educational program "Scenarios of the Future of Russia", created by the Institute for Strategic Studies and Forecasts of the RUDN University. Under the guise of scientific and educational lectures “on countering destructive political forces”, representatives of the institute, during their visits to more than 40 Moscow and a dozen regional universities, assessed the “protest potential” of students and teachers. Based on the results of the events, certificates were drawn up for official use for representatives of state authorities and specialized structures.

== Movement structure ==
There is no official leader of the movement, the direct leadership is carried out by the co-chairs:

- Julia Berezikova — world champion in fighting without rules.
- Anton Demidov — public figure.
- Alexander Zaldostanov — President of the All-Russian motorcycle club "Night Wolves".
- Dmitry Sablin — Senator, Deputy Chairman of VOOV "Combat Brotherhood".
- Nikolai Starikov — writer, leader of the Great Fatherland Party.

=== Activists ===
- theater and film actor Mikhail Porechenkov
- theater and film actor Alexander Tsurkan
- actress Daria Yurgens
- actor and writer Andrey Negrivoda

== See also ==
- Soviet imagery during the Russo-Ukrainian War
