= Alexander Basansky =

Russian oligarch (born 1963)

Alexander Alexandrovich Basansky (Russian: Александр Александрович Басанский; born 6 May 1963) is a Russian oligarch. According to a 2022 article, he is the First Deputy Chairman of the Magadan Oblast Duma. He is a former high-ranking officer in the Soviet special services, and an ally of Russian president Vladimir Putin.

According to Forbes, he had the fourth highest income amongst all Russian civil servants. His son is the politician Anton Basansky.

According to the Office of Foreign Assets Control, he has not been sanctioned during the Russian invasion of Ukraine by the United States as of September 2023.

== Biography ==
Basansky was born on 6 May 1963, in Dykanka, Ukraine Soviet Socialist Republic, Soviet Union. He worked as an apprentice electrician in Ukraine, then later in mining in the Magadan Oblast. From 1981 to 1982, he served in the Soviet Army. In the 1990s, he served as an executive in a number of companies. He is a founder and owner of the company Arbat («Арбат»), and the director of Agat («Агат») since 1998.

He graduated from the Moscow State Open University in 2001.

He has substantial influence in the region of Kolyma in the Russian Far East. According to an article in The Wall Street Journal, while in Kolyma, Basansky openly ignores the law. He allegedly openly ordered violence against a business rival, whom he referred to as a "rat", and drives recklessly.
