= 2014 Euromaidan regional state administration occupations =

Activist occupations in Ukraine

- Part of Euromaidan and the Revolution of Dignity
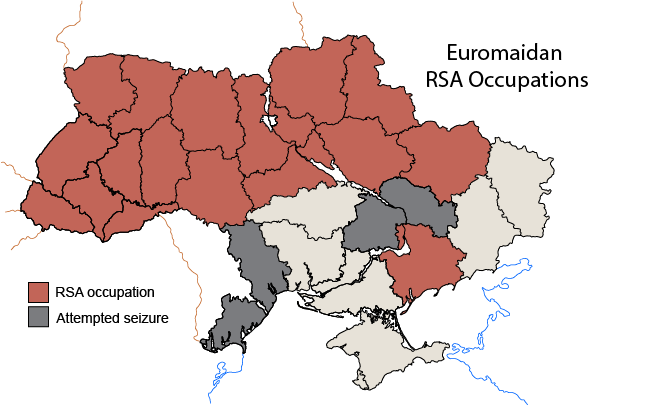
- Overview of all occupations
- Date: 23 January – 17 February 2014 (first wave); 18–26 February 2014 (second wave)
- Location: Ukraine
- Caused by: Support for the Euromaidan movement; Adoption of strict anti-protest laws
- Goals: Removal of Viktor Yanukovych and supporting regional governors
- Methods: Occupation of administrative buildings; Blockades
- Result: Buildings relinquished after amnesty law (first wave); Removal of Victor Yanukovych and the Second Azarov Government, repeal of anti-protest laws (second wave)

Parties
Activists	Government of Ukraine

As part of the Euromaidan movement, regional state administration (RSA) buildings in various oblasts of Ukraine were occupied by protesters, starting on 23 January 2014.

== Background ==
Ukraine had become gripped by unrest since President Viktor Yanukovych refused to sign an association agreement with the European Union on 21 November 2013. A widespread movement known as 'Euromaidan' demanded closer ties with the European Union, and the ousting of President Yanukovych. Significant support for the movement built in western Ukrainian oblasts as the severity of the unrest in Kyiv grew. As a result, protesters in these regions began to seize control of the oblast governor's offices, known as regional state administration (RSA) buildings.

By 27 January, ten of the country's twenty-seven RSAs had been overthrown, and others had come under threat.

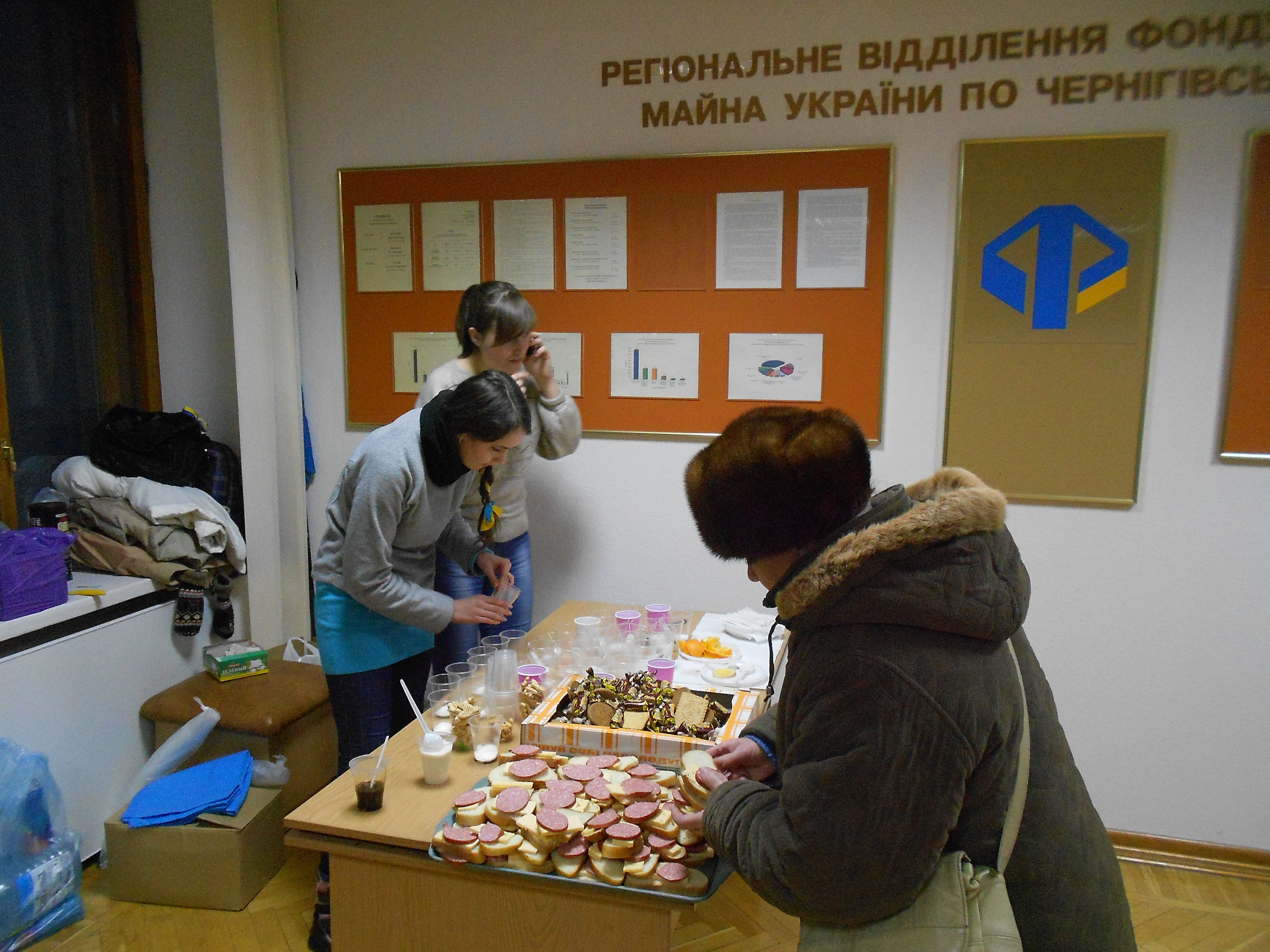
Occupiers at Chernihiv RSA on 27 January

Occupiers later relinquished control of the buildings, to meet the terms of a legal amnesty for Euromaidan protesters that came into effect on 17 February, as directed by the government of Ukraine. The day after the amnesty came into effect, protesters seized control of the buildings they had previously vacated in response to a crackdown on demonstrations on the Maidan Nezalezhnosti in Kyiv by the Berkut special police force.

After the Euromaidan movement successfully overthrew President Yanukovych on 22 February, RSA occupations by Euromaidan activists gradually ceased. Opposition to the Euromaidan in largely Russophone eastern and southern Ukraine, however, led to protests by pro-Russian and anti-government groups in those regions. Protesters there would quickly begin to attempt to occupy RSA buildings in a similar manner.

== Timeline of the occupations ==
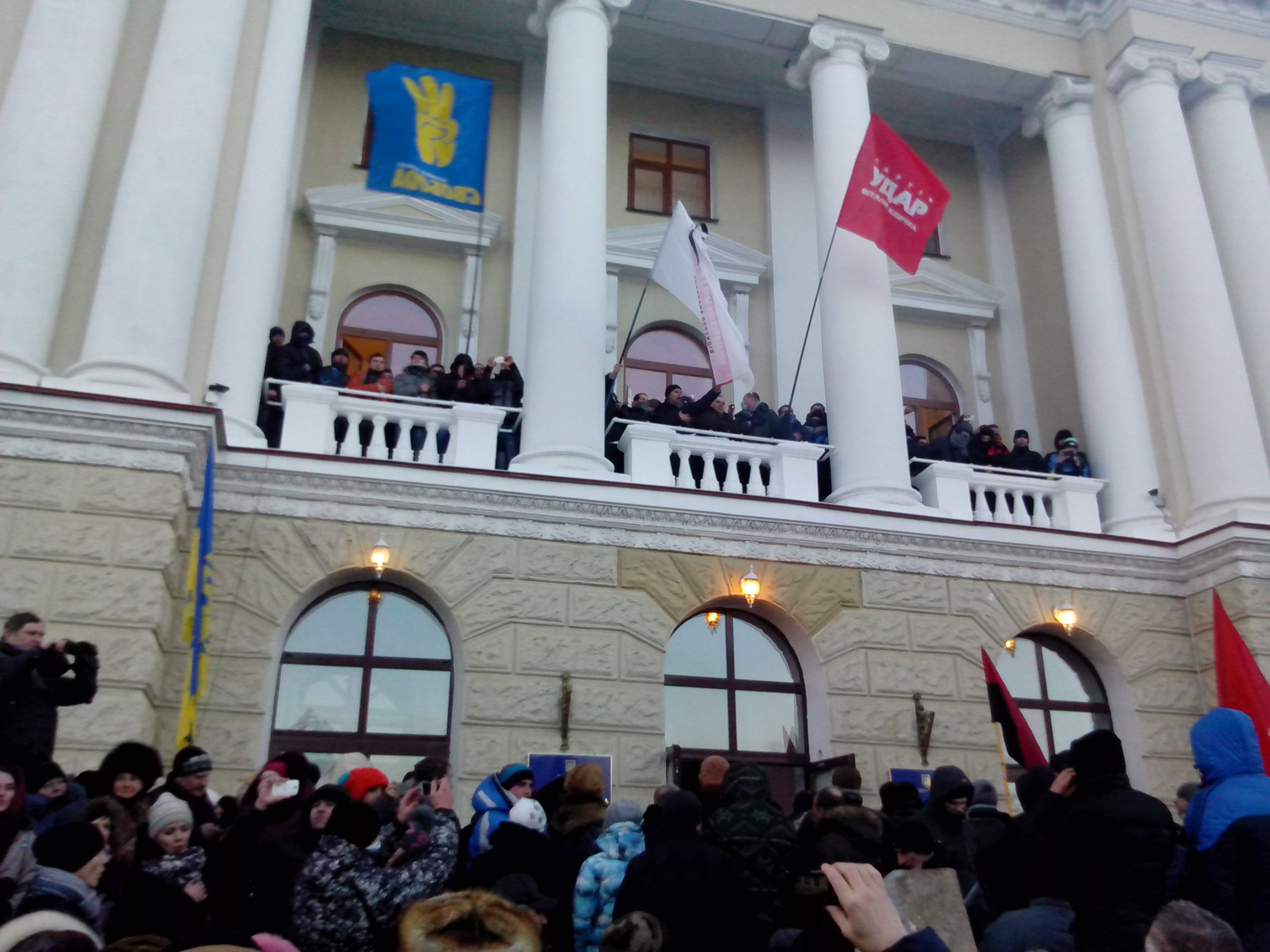
Occupied RSA in Khmelnytskyi

=== 23 January ===
Following a standoff between protesters and government forces in Kyiv on 23 January, tensions flared as anti-government forces mobilized and overtook the Regional State Administration (RSA) of a number of western Ukrainian cities, with some local governors being forced to file letters of resignation. By the afternoon, the administrations of Lviv, Rivne, Ternopil, and Khmelnytskyi Oblasts were also in the hands of anti-government protesters.

In Lviv, around 2,000 protesters stormed the RSA building shouting "Revolution!" Governor Oleg Salo, a presidential appointee, signed a letter of resignation as a result of the takeover. The mayor of Lviv, in response, declared that none of the 'Black Thursday' laws would ever apply on the territory of Lviv. Ternopil city council denounced the 'Black Thursday' laws and demanded they be repealed. Activists in Khmelnytskyi erected barricades and surrounded the Khmelnytskyi Oblast RSA building. As a result, the Khmelnytskyi city council issued a series of demands including snap elections and the dissolution of the Berkut. Cherkasy RSA was also occupied when thousands of protestors stormed the building but were later expelled by police. By the end of 23 January, Lviv, Ternopil, Rivne, and Khmelnytskyi remained in the control of anti-government forces. In addition, a number of local administrations were blockaded but not physically overtaken, including those of Sumy, Ivano-Frankivsk, Vinnytsia, Poltava, and Zhytomyr.

Prime Minister Azarov called the occupying force not a part of the political opposition, but rather a rebellion, and president Yanukovych condemned the takeover of public buildings. Counter to the anti-government sentiment, the administration of Crimea rejected calls for a snap election and encouraged Crimeans to rebuff any attempts to seize power by the opposition.

=== 24 January ===
Ivano-Frankivsk was overtaken on the second day of opposition pressure while, according to some, Governor Chudnov escaped; meanwhile in Lutsk, 5,000 opposition members surrounded the administration building, and Volyn Oblast Governor Kilmchuk momentarily kneeled before protesters pleading with them to disperse peacefully. Ceding to protestors' demands, Governor Kilmchuk and Councillor Voitovych resigned. The RSA of Chernivtsi was stormed and occupied by thousands of protestors who forced Governor Mykhailo Papiev to tender his resignation. Lutsk and Uzhhorod's administrations were blockaded, in addition to standing blockades in Poltava, Vinnytsia, and Zhytomyr. Uzhhorod Governor Oleksandr Ledida's ranch was burned down in a suspected arson attack. Uzhhorod protesters dispersed for the evening with intent to reconvene the next day. In response police fortified the RSAs in Dnipropetrovsk, Mykolayiv, and Zhytomyr. By 11 p.m., the regional state administration of Sumy was breached and occupied, but officials refused to capitulate.

=== 25 January ===
Protesters first seized the RSA of Vinnytsia; seven police officers were injured in the assault which drew over 1,000 opposition supporters, but the remainder of police stood down peacefully to the cheers of protesters; governor Ivan Movchan not resigned. Protesters managed to occupy the RSA building in Chernihiv, demanding the resignation of the governor. Later that day, protesters occupied the chamber of the RSA in Poltava as 2,000 protesters overwhelmed 400 police, forming an impromptu parliament named Nationalna Rada. Uzhhorod was blockaded by protesters, who were split between pro-government and anti-government factions. In Sumy, over 5,000 citizens protested in front of the RSA building but did not attempt to take it. 150 Kherson Residents block local regional state administration. Also on 25 January, regional lawmakers in Lviv voted to establish a parallel government. Mykolayiv was occupied by Party of Regions members, with the interior barricaded; opposition leaders were not allowed to enter.

=== 26 January ===
A notable shift occurred in the country's east, with BBC News suggesting, "[U]nrest is spreading further into the country's east, which has traditionally had closer ties with Russia and is President Viktor Yanukovych's support base". (Note: The resignation of Ukrainian President Viktor Yanukovych is one of the demands of the Euromaidan movement.) Protesters in Zaporizhia threatened to seize the RSA, demanding the resignation of the governor. Governor Oleksandr Peklushenko emerged to announce that only "cowards and traitors" resign and vowed to retain his Party of Regions membership card "until the day I die" before disappearing back inside. (He indeed died in mysterious circumstances in March 2015). By 2 p.m., the crowd grew to 10,000 and attempted to storm the RSA against hundreds of police guarding the entrance; (Note: The crowd chanted "Zaporizhian Sich!") at least five protesters were injured as police violently dispersed the crowd using rubber bullets and batons, with the help of plain-clothed titushky wearing white armbands; over 200 were arrested. Up to 2,000 marched on the RSA in Odesa, but were repelled by pro-government supporters and municipal barricades. In Sumy, protesters occupied the city's council building with a Batkivshchyna MP taking leadership; elsewhere, a crackdown by police occurred on protesters in the city. The first floor of the Sumy RSA was occupied but police held the remainder in the standoff; the exter Activists in Chernihiv set up a barricade, fortifying the regional administration building. 500 protesters picketed the entrance to the Mykolayiv RSA; there was suspicion that titushky enforcements were stationed inside. 50 members of the right-wing group Right Sector attempted to seize the building, but were dissuaded by the peaceful protesters. 3,000 attempted to capture the RSA in Dnipropetrovsk and were met by over 200 police; 37 were arrested. The conflict led to instances of rioting, Titushky violently beat protesters, whom they hunted down in the streets; they also wore identifiable yellow arm bands. Dnipropetrovsk Governor Kolesnikov called the protesters 'extreme radical thugs from other regions'. There were also mass demonstrations in Kirovohrad but the RSA was guarded by a heavy police presence; the leaders of the local UDAR and Svoboda parties were raided and arrested in their homes. In Kremenchuk (Poltava Oblast), protesters attempted to seize the city council. Some 2,000 people gathered for a people's assembly in Cherkasy, south-east of Kyiv; the crowd voted for the creation of a People's Rada and gave the local governor 24 hours to resign from his post. Some managed to break windows and breach the building. One-thousand protesters in Kyiv advanced on the RSA in the capital, forming nearby but not assaulting the building. Zhytomyr remained in a standoff.

=== 27 January ===
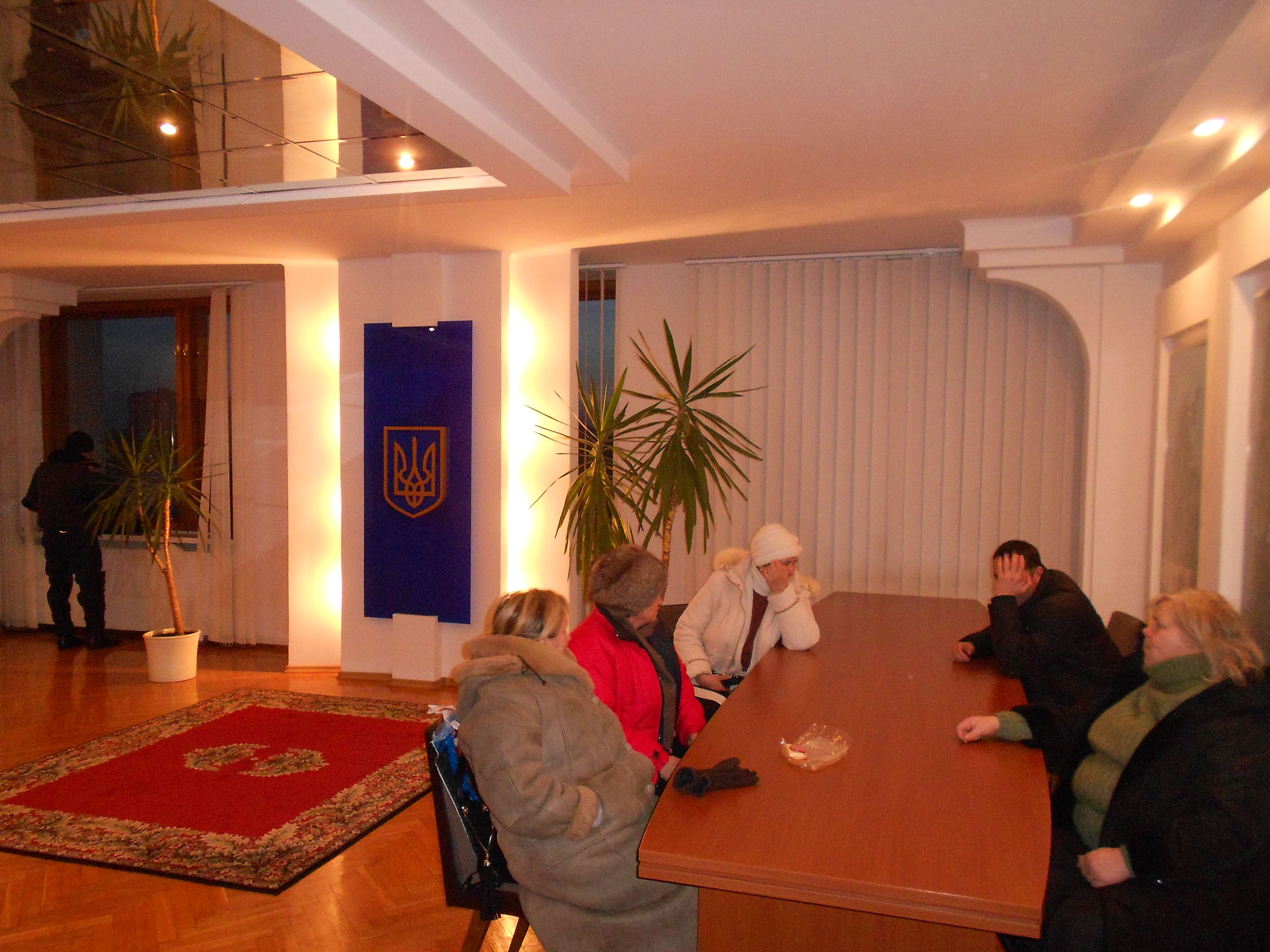
Activists in the Chernihiv Oblast RSA

At 12:20 a.m. on the 27th, a blockade in Cherkasy was re-established, only for police forces to later break it, arresting twelve citizens; foreign journalists reporting on the scene were beaten by Berkut troops. Another attempt was made on Dnipropetrovsk early 27 January, but was repelled. Police announced on the 27th plans to re-take Chernihiv's regional administration, but instead, protesters were able to come and go within the administration without any fight or resistance from police. Uzhhorod remained in a standoff, but not blocked due to the police presence. Eleven citizens were arrested in connection with the three-day blockade of Sumy's RSA following a late night dispersal where 300 internal troops beat protesters. The tactics used by police were denounced by the mayor of the city.

Mykolayiv remained barricaded from the inside with police officers stationed there, and doors remained barred to all opposition politicians, but not members of the Party of Regions. In Zhytomyr, the RSA remained barricaded from indoors by police, preventing even journalists from entering. Night Wolves bikers from Russia secured the RSA in Sevastopol. Patrols were also set up in Kharkiv, Luhansk, and Simferopol.

=== 28 January ===
Activists in Lviv announced they would partially vacate the RSA to allow local officials to work, but keep up barricades; infighting ensued between activists and members of Svoboda over control of the building, which remained occupied. Protesters occupying the RSA in Chernihiv agreed to withdraw from the building after deputies agreed to support the demands of the opposition; a statement was made by both opposition and ruling government politicians supporting the removal of the anti-protest laws and amnesty for Euromaidan activists and political prisoners. Thousands rallied and besieged the RSA in Uzhhorod, which was barricaded by police from the interior. Without taking the building, a People's Rada was democratically established by the Zakarpattia Regional Council, supporting the opposition. Khmenlytskyi was further barricaded by opposition members to defend it from police.

More than 2,000 public sector employees in Dnipropetrovsk declared an indefinite rally was being held near the RSA in support of the government. Meanwhile, the RSA was surrounded in barbed wire, and windows and fences surrounding the perimeter were covered in grease to stop protesters from re-attempting to take the building. In Kherson, metal grilles were installed on the windows. Odesa fortified their RSA with concrete blocks so as to prevent any entry. On social networks, Party of Regions supporters attempted to spread mass hysteria in Mykolayiv by spreading false information of the city being under attack; only 60 supporters were found outside the RSA and no attempt to seize the building occurred. Sumy was barricaded by police and provincial and city council members were forced to convene elsewhere.

=== 29 January ===
The RSA in Lviv was vacated except for the second floor, where the governor's office is located. The barricade in front of the Uzhhorod RSA was fully lifted from both sides, with security forces leaving and protesters peacefully convening, not impeding state workers. Several hundred protesters blocked the entrance to the Zhytomyr RSA in the morning. Pro-government supporters also arrived and changed, "Fascists will not pass;" crowds dispersed by 2:30 p.m.

Twenty-six activists of the Zaporozhye meetings of 26 Jan 2014 were sentenced to remain under house arrest (among them two for 24 hours a day) until the final court decision. Six activists were released on bail until the final court decision.

=== 30 January ===
In Lviv protesters handed the RSA over to the Lviv Regional Council. Employees of the regional council sealed up the second floor of the building which houses the governor and his administration. In Vinnytsia, a compromise was made which allowed employees of the RSA to come and go unimpeded, while many offices remained closed.

=== 1–17 February ===
On 1 February, the barricades around the RSA in Vinnytsia were partially dismantled for fire safety purposes; protesters said they would only be fully removed once the governor met their demands.

On 2 February, the RSA in Poltava went back under government control.

On 5 February, President Viktor Yanukovych officially dismissed Borys Klimchuk as Volyn Oblast governor and appointed Oleksandr Bashkalenko to this post.

On 5 February 2014 The New York Times described the RSA in Dnipropetrovsk as "a fortress" including a "lobby strung with razor wire and packed with security officials" and reported the police blocking "all but official cars from taking a nearby road".

On 16 February protesters released their captured RSAs to comply with the "Law on amnesty of Ukrainian protesters" and allow the exemption from criminal liabilities and punishment for Euromaidan protesters who committed crimes in the period 27 December 2013 through 2 February 2014 to come into effect. This law was only in effect if the conditions (vacating of the seized administrative buildings, among them the regional state administrations, self-government bodies and the Kyiv City State Administration, and the unblocking of Kyiv's Hrushevskoho Street) were met by 17 February 2014. In the morning of 16 February protesters left Lviv, Ternopil, Ivano-Frankivsk, Poltava regional administrations. The Ivano-Frankivsk regional administration resumed operation while several dozen former occupiers remained posted in the square in front of the building.

=== 18 February ===
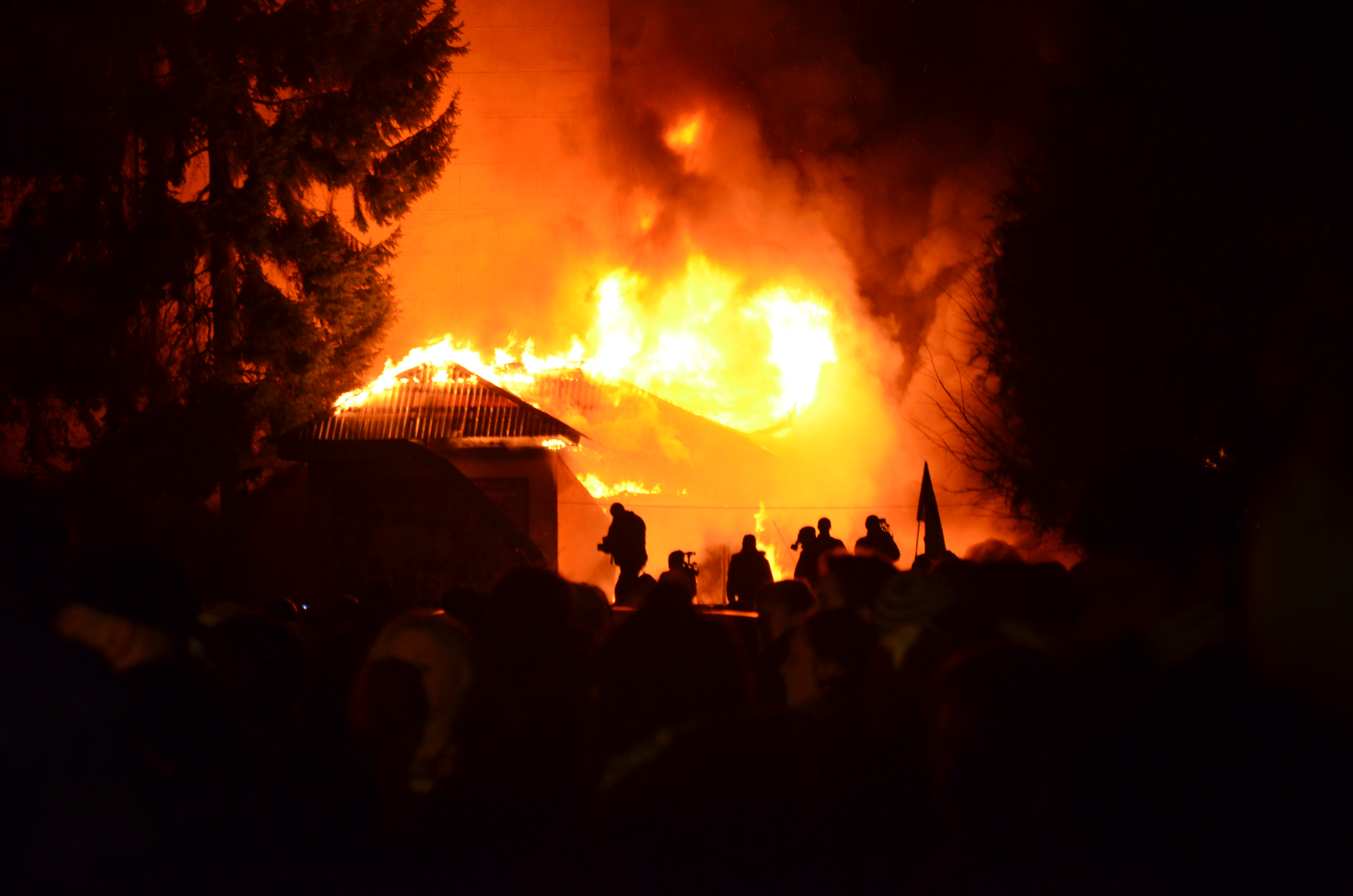
Burning building in the main entrance of the internal military forces in Lviv on 19 February 2014.

At 2:30pm, protesters in Ivano-Frankivsk stormed the Ministry of Internal Affairs and then took over the headquarters of the Security Service of Ukraine (SBU). SBU staff refused to surrender the building, and protesters threw molotov cocktails and rocks at the building; all windows in the building were shattered, security bars removed, and the entrance set on fire. Berkut officers, who boarded themselves in the city's police station, eventually surrendered and left unarmed. The RSA was later captured.

In Ternopil, the local attorney general's office was seized by protesters, and criminal case files burned. Interior troops defected from the government and sided with the people. On the 19th, Berkut officers stationed in Ternopil defected to the side of the people, swearing on a Bible an oath of allegiance in front of up to 7,000 people. The RSA was then captured.

In Zhytomyr a new People's Rada was declared in opposition to the governing administration. The RSA in Zhytomyr was stormed by 3,000 people the next day, and set fire to the police department. The mayor of the city resigned from the Party of Regions.

In Lviv, 10,000 protesters seized the general prosecutor's office, the local Ministry of Internal Affairs (MVS) building, and the SBU building. Documents from the prosecutor's office were thrown out and burned. The Interior Ministry building was burned. Soldiers in the MVS building were allowed to surrender unarmed. A BBC correspondent suggested the Interior Troops who did surrender were likely conscripts who support the protests.

=== 19 February ===
In Kharkiv, pro-government assailants attempted to burn down the Svoboda party headquarters. Fights then broke out between activists allied with FC Metalist Kharkiv fans and Interior Ministry and Berkut riot troops when they tried blocking the academy that trains interior troops.

In Odesa about 100 unidentified men wearing masks and helmets and armed with baseball bats assaulted a pro-European opposition demonstration near the regional administration headquarters.

In Dnipropetrovsk there was a picket near the Regional State Administration.

In Chernihiv, thousands picketed the Interior Ministry building. By 7:00 pm, 2,500 citizens rallied in Chernihiv's city center. An Interior Ministry spokesman promised he would petition to have all local Berkut troops stationed in Kyiv recalled, and that no Chernihiv Interior Troops would be sent to Kyiv.

In Kryvyi Rih, unknowns set fire to UDAR's offices and attempted to break in.

A woman was shot dead in Khmelnytskyi during the storming of a local SBU office by anti-government EuroMaidan protesters. "The car arrived to the building and the woman was shot from it, with six to eight bullets in her chest. She died in the ambulance". Two men were also suffered gunshot wounds. Afterwards, activists set the regional SBU building on fire with burning car tires. Protesters then took the local RSA. In Chernivtsi, several thousand citizens stormed the local RSA, overtaking it. Governor Papiev then resigned from his post.

In Lutsk the RSA of Volyn Oblast was captured by protesters; there was no police resistance. The police, following skirmishes, defected to the people. Protesters then took the governor of Volyn Oblast captive, forced him to his knees to ask forgiveness, and resign; they then doused him in water to remind him of the fire hoses used on protesters in Kyiv. Protesters threatened to go to his house and capture his family as well to force his resignation.

In Rivne 3,000–4,000 citizens rallied outside the prosecutor's office. The regional MVS department was also seized, with police surrendering the building; and the head of the regional SBU said they would work with the people and that Alpha units would not be used. Right Sector also took the Berkut base in Rivne. Rivne's RSA was also taken.

In Sumy, protesters besieged the local Ministry of Internal Affairs department, demanding police withdraw. Several were injured when fired upon by police with rubber bullets. Locals sacked the headquarters of the Party of Regions.

One-thousand five-hundred protesters in Vinnytsia stormed the regional Ministry of Internal Affairs department.

In Uzhhorod the RSA was stormed and seized after police vacated the area.

In Poltava, a thousand protesters clashed with police outside the RSA, and then issued an ultimatum that if they were not allowed entry they would barricade the building and prevent it from functioning. By late night, the building remained barricaded and surrounded by protesters, and defended by police.

The Korczowa border crossing into Poland was blocked by protesters.

Hours after protesters seized the prosecutor's office in central Lviv and forced a surrender by Interior Ministry police, the executive committee of the region council—also called the People's Rada—claimed control over Lviv Oblast.

The regime has begun active military action against people [...] Dozens of people have been killed in Kyiv and hundreds have been wounded [...] Fulfilling the will of society, the executive committee of the Lviv region's council, the People's Rada, is assuming full responsibility for the fate of the region and its citizens

Weapons and ammunition were stolen from the Ukrainian Security Service in Ivano-Frankivsk and Lviv.

=== 20 February ===
In Cherkasy Oblast about 500 residents of the town Mankivka, city of Uman set up a checkpoint on the highway from Odesa to Kyiv, near Podibna. After a jeep ran over a 40-year-old person, killing the victim, an angry crowd attacked a bus transport carrying Interior Troops; the crowd smashed its windows and slashed its tires. Soldiers' ammunition and weapons were seized, and they were sent back to Uman on another bus. Afterwards, the locals seized another bus full of titushky, government-thugs, en route from the Crimea, arrested the titushky, and set the bus on fire. At the blockade, police shot 1 protester dead, and injured 10 others. Later, SBU officers were witnessed burning documents outside the SBU headquarters in Cherkasy.

By 8 am, protesters and police in Poltava ended their standoff, reaching an agreement that the RSA would be blockaded and police would be allowed to occupy the interior, thus preventing clashes while shutting down the building. 1,500 demonstrators occupied city hall, and others assaulted the RSA with petrol bombs. By evening, police surrendered the RSA and City Hall peacefully.

The head of the SBU in Khmelnytsky region resigned as a result of the deaths that occurred while repelling protesters with live ammunition. He was then arrested and taken to a military detention center for questioning.

In Lutsk, police and Internal Troops defected to the side of the protestors. Berkut were recalled from Kyiv back to Volyn region. Members of Right Sector and self-defence units seized ammunition and supplies from the Internal Troops base, which was surrendered voluntarily by officers.

In Zhytomyr, the governor left the Party of Regions, and the RSA remained occupied by members of Right Sector.

In Uzhhorod, the SBU and Berkut defected to the people, and police vowed not to execute orders. The regional council dissolved the Party of Regions with council members turning in their membership cards.

Rallies continued in Sumy, demanding security forces to withdraw from Kyiv, members of the opposition entered the RSA for negotiations.

In Lviv, police and SBU defected to the side of the Euromaidan protesters and the new regional authorities (People's Rada). At 6:30pm, an explosion occurred somewhere at the Berkut barracks, and the building caught fire (the cause of which was not officially determined). Reporters saw masked individuals fleeing the scene. 2 Berkut died in the fire. Lviv banned wearing masks and balaclavas in public places.

In Vinnytsia, protesters broke into the Communist and Party of Regions headquarters and occupied the buildings.

=== 21–26 February ===
Authorities in eastern and southern Ukraine began making preparations for possible assaults on RSA buildings on 21 February. Odesa remained barricaded with concrete, and Dnipropetrovsk with barbed wire, while Donetsk was reinforced with metal doors and Krivohrad with sandbags.

On 22 February, Victor Yanukovych was effectively overthrown, marking the success of the 2014 Ukrainian revolution. The governors of Mykolayiv and Chernihiv resigned. The governor of Vinnytsia defected from Party of Regions. The governor of Kharkiv fled the country after being charged with separatism by the SBU; the RSA in Kharkiv was occupied by protesters wishing to examine his office.

On 23 February, Zaporizhia RSA was occupied by 4,500 protesters, and the governor of Vinnytsia resigns from his post.

On 24 February, the governor of Volyn resigned. Kharkiv was blockaded. Governor of Sumy resigns. Governor of Kyiv Oblast resigns. Cherkasy's regional council announced an extraordinary session to dismiss the governor of the RSA on the 25th.

On 25 February, the governor of Cherkasy resigned.

On 26 February, the governor of Kharkiv, Mikhail Dobkin, resigned.

=== Post-revolution ===
On 15 March, new governors were appointed for Khmelnytsky, Vinnytsia, and Chernivtsi.

== Banning of political parties ==
In the days after anti-government forces had overtaken their Regional State Administration (RSA), the regional councils of Ternopil and Ivano-Frankivsk, Chernivtsi, and Poltava Oblast all decided to ban the activities and symbols of the Communist Party of Ukraine and Party of Regions in their oblasts.

In response to these measures, the Presidium of the Supreme Council of Crimea (the Crimean parliament) banned the activities and symbols of the Svoboda party on its territory on 27 January 2014. Politicians in Donetsk Oblast intend to do the same. On 7 February 2014 the Crimean parliament reversed its decision to ban Svoboda "and other radical groups on the territory of Crimea". Instead the Crimean parliament intended to file a lawsuit to seek a full ban on the activities by Svoboda because it saw its activates as "aimed at forcible change of a legitimate administration and undermining the security of the state".

On 3 February 2014, the self-proclaimed "People's council of Kyiv's Desnianskyi District" banned the activities and symbols of the Communist Party of Ukraine and Party of Regions in their administrative raion.

In January 2014, the Party of Regions faction in Lviv disbanded. On 20 February, in Zakarpattia, Rivne and Zhytomyr, the Party of Regions faction disbanded, and in Chernivtsi on the 21st. On 21 February, Vinnytsia dissolved its Party of Regions faction. On 24 February the Party of Regions factions in Cherkasy and Sumy dissolved.

On 18 March 2014, Ukrainian Prime Minister Arseniy Yatsenyuk (in an "address to the residents of the southern and eastern regions of Ukraine") stated he was opposed to a ban of Party of Regions "Its political responsibility for what Yanukovych has done to the country is obvious but the verdict is solely up to you, voters, and no one else. People can ban any party at elections".
