= Velyka Danylivka =

Neighborhood in Kharkiv

Coordinates: 50°02′46″N 36°20′10″E

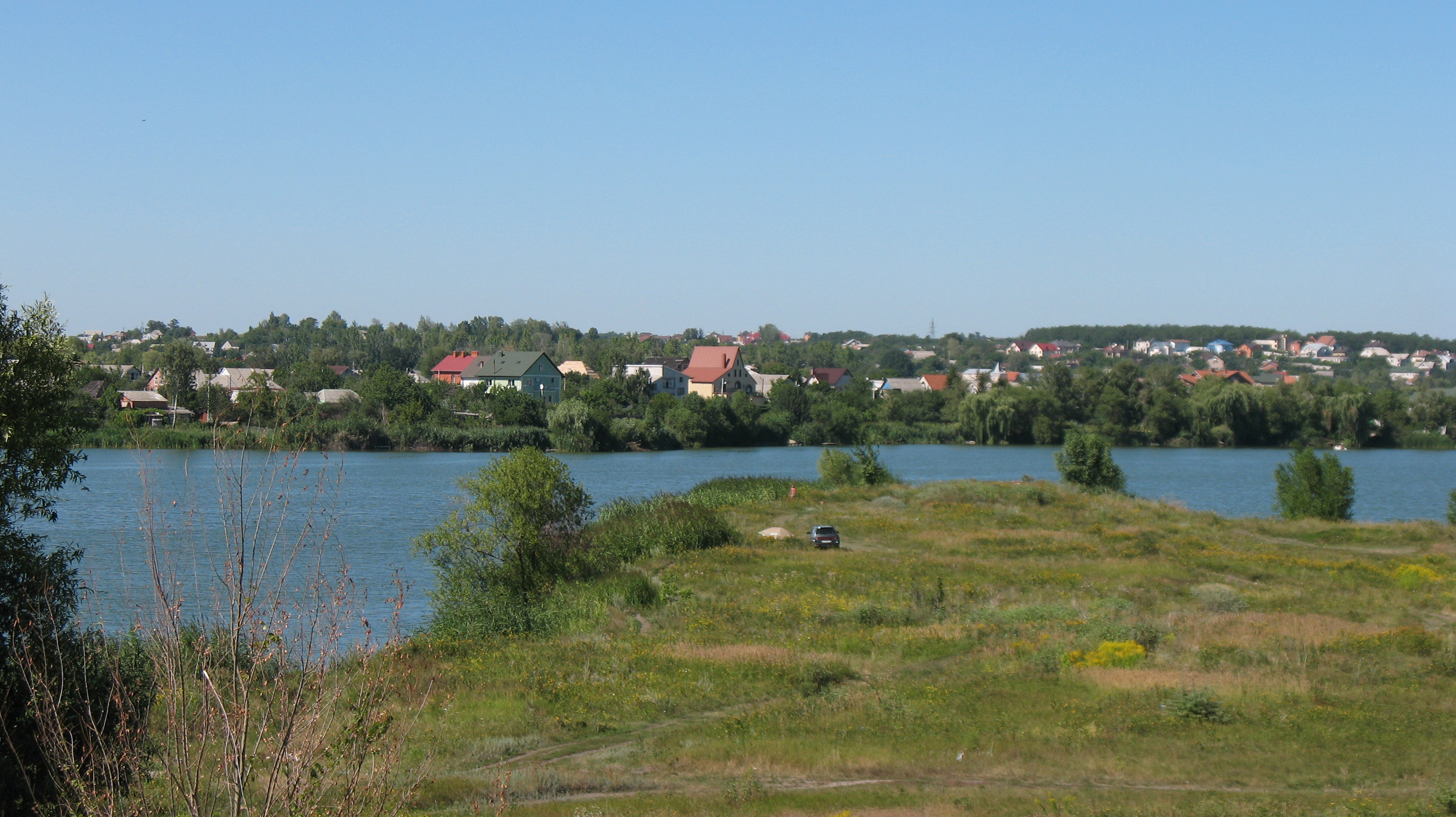
- Interactive map of Velyka Danylivka
- Country: Ukraine
- Oblast: Kharkiv Oblast
- Kharkiv: Kharkiv
- District: Kyivsky District

Population
  - Total: 5,000

Velyka Danylivka is a neighbourhood in Kyivsky District of Kharkiv. The village was fully absorbed into Kharkiv in 1986. Known for "Babushka Z" and the Russian invasion of Ukraine. The town has a population of 5,000 people. The town has been subject to shelling during the ongoing war.

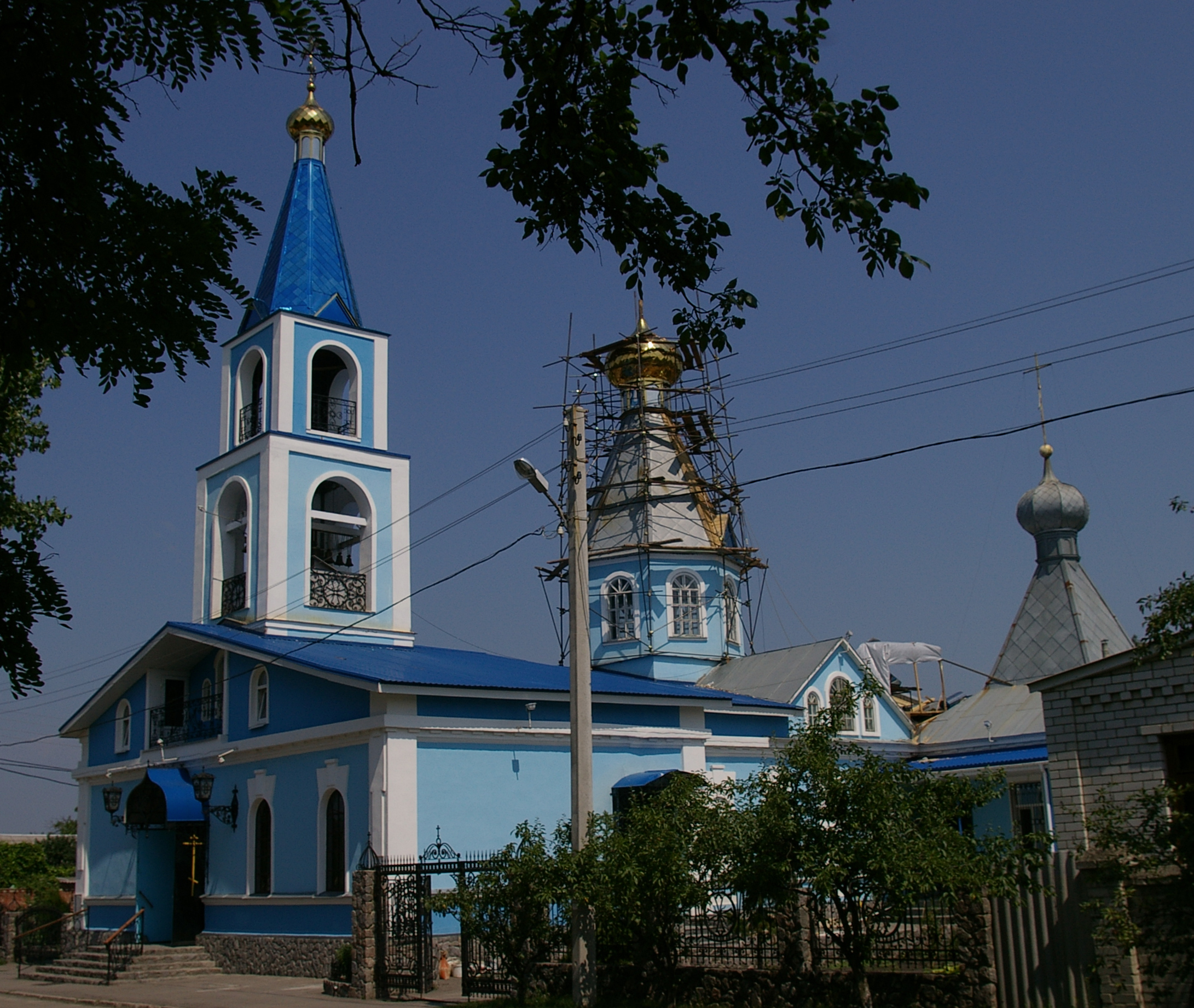
Pokrovsky Church

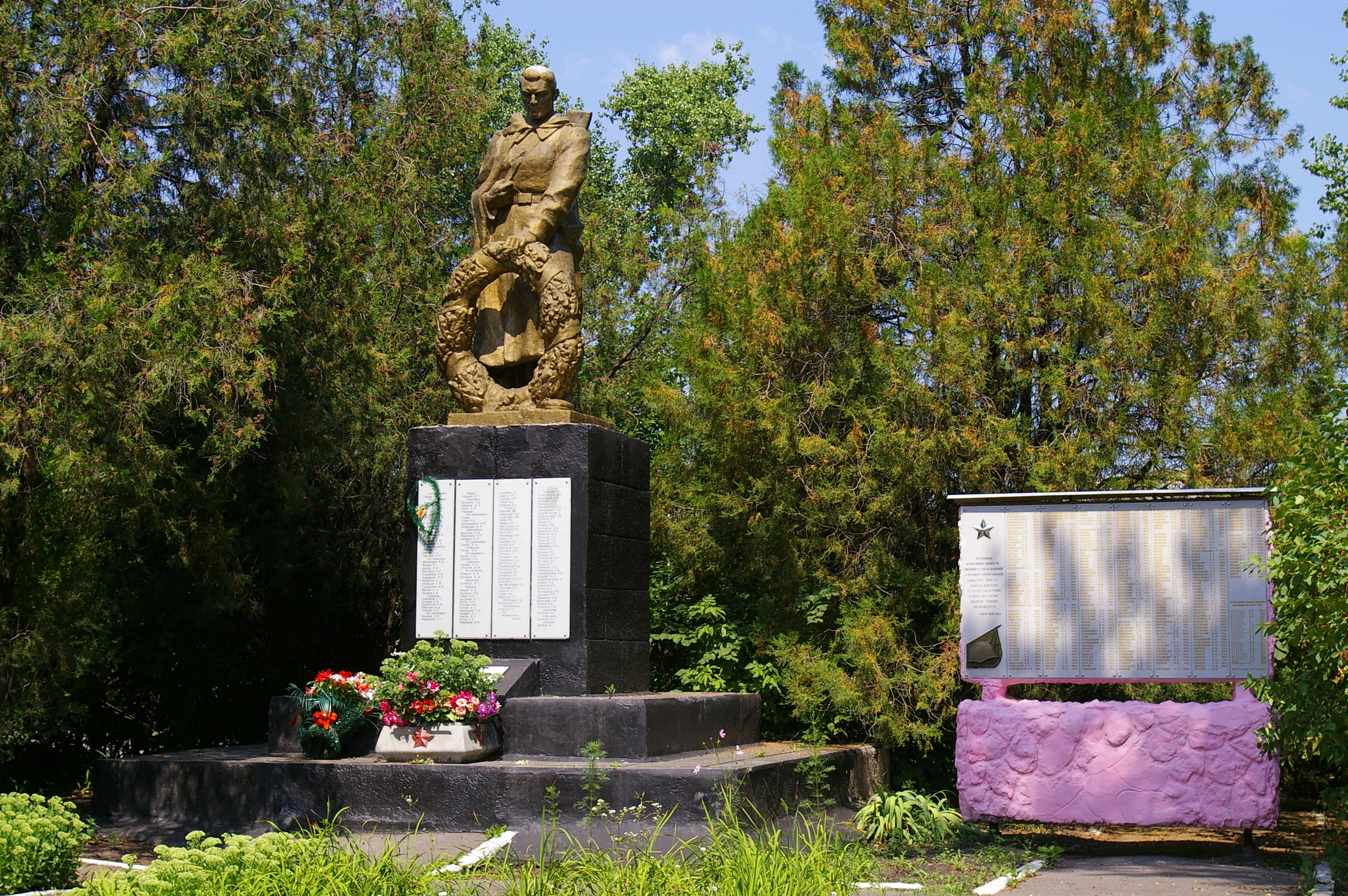
War Memorial
