= Soviet imagery during the Russo-Ukrainian war =

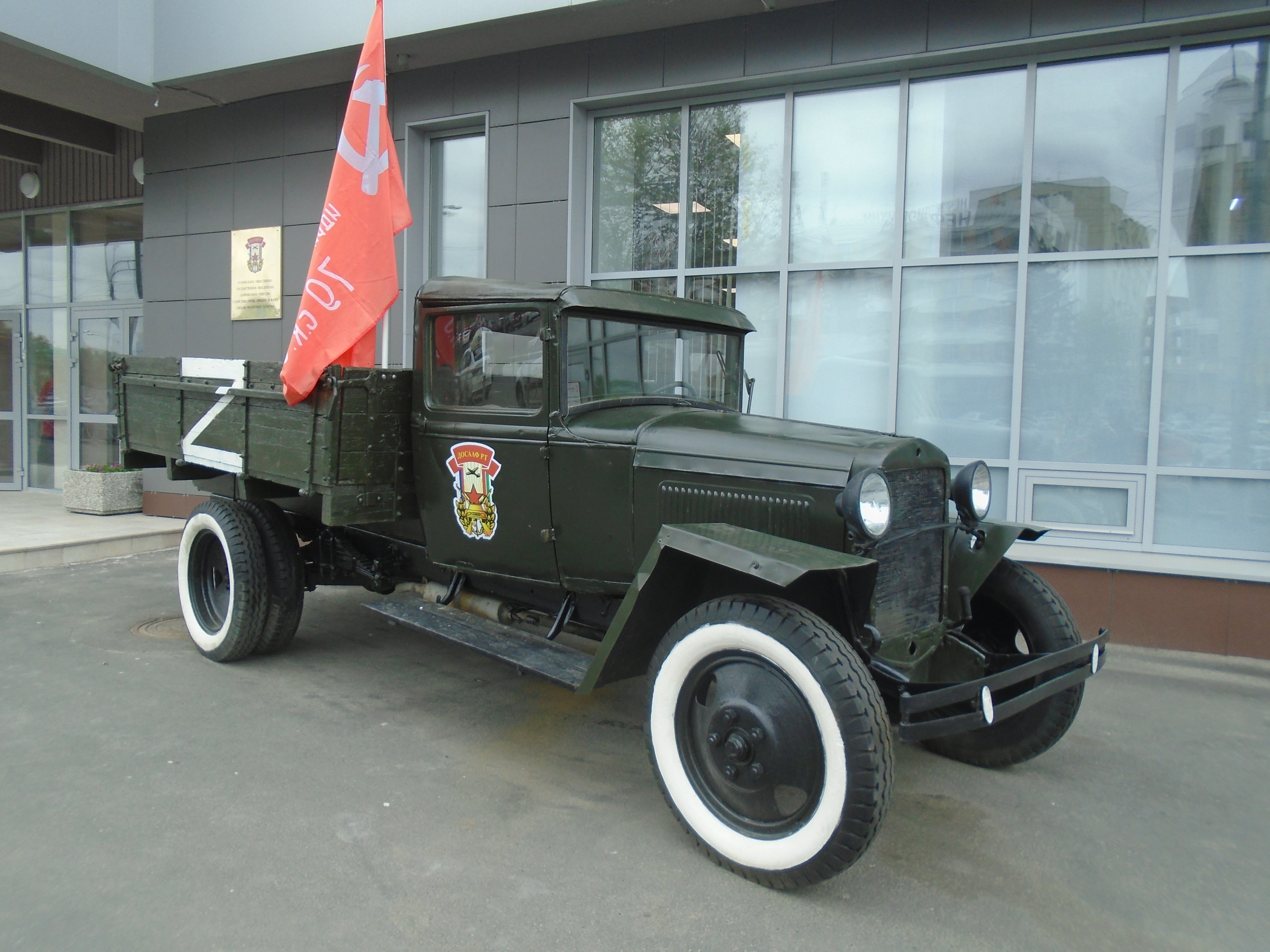
A GAZ-AA truck in Kazan displaying the Soviet Victory Banner and the Z symbol, which has been used in expressions of support for the Russian invasion of Ukraine, May 2022

Imagery promoting the Soviet Union has been a prominent aspect of the Russo-Ukrainian War, especially since the beginning of the Russian invasion of Ukraine in February 2022. Both Russia and Russian separatist forces in Ukraine have used Soviet symbols as a means of expressing their antipathy to Ukraine and to Ukrainian decommunization policies. For Russia, in particular, these displays are also part of a broader campaign to de-legitimize Ukrainian statehood and justify annexations of the country's territory, as was the case with Crimea in March 2014 and with southeastern Ukraine in September 2022.

In occupied Ukraine, alongside the Soviet flag, the Russian military has frequently flown the Victory Banner, which was raised by the Red Army at the Reichstag during the Battle of Berlin in May 1945. In 2015, Ukraine passed laws banning all communist and Nazi symbols. Consequently, it is illegal under Ukrainian law to use Soviet imagery.

== Purpose ==
The flag of the Soviet Union, which has been used by the Russian military and pro-Russian militias in Ukraine since 2014.

The Victory Banner, which was raised by the Red Army at the Reichstag during the Battle of Berlin in May 1945, has been flown alongside the Russian flag and the Soviet flag in many parts of Russian-occupied Ukraine.

During the Russian invasion of Ukraine, many Russian military vehicles have been seen sporting the Soviet flag and the Victory Banner. American political scientist Mark Beissinger told France 24 that the Russians' motivation for promoting the Soviet Union was not necessarily rooted in a desire to re-establish a communist state, but rather in a desire to re-establish "Russian domination over Ukraine" and stand in opposition to Ukrainian decommunization, which is aimed at shedding the legacy and influence of the Russian SFSR. Soviet symbols are illegal in Ukraine, and displaying them is also widely regarded as a provocative act in the other post-Soviet states, excluding Russia and Belarus, which has been involved in the Russian invasion.

American historian Anne Applebaum told The Guardian that: "Because modern Russia stands for nothing except corruption, nihilism, and Putin's personal power, they have brought back Soviet flags as well as Lenin statues to symbolise Russian victory." In many occupied Ukrainian towns and cities, including government buildings, Ukrainian flags have been replaced with Victory Banners. The Victory Banner, which was raised at the Reichstag to mark the Soviet Union's victory over Nazi Germany during the Battle of Berlin in May 1945, is used to represent the claim by Russian president Vladimir Putin that Ukraine needs to be de-Nazified. During the Euromaidan in 2013 and 2014, many monuments dedicated to the Russian revolutionary Vladimir Lenin were removed, and this process was accelerated during the Revolution of Dignity in 2014 and again after the passing of Ukrainian decommunization laws in 2015. Since 2022, however, a number of these monuments have been re-erected in Russian-occupied Ukraine.

== Events ==
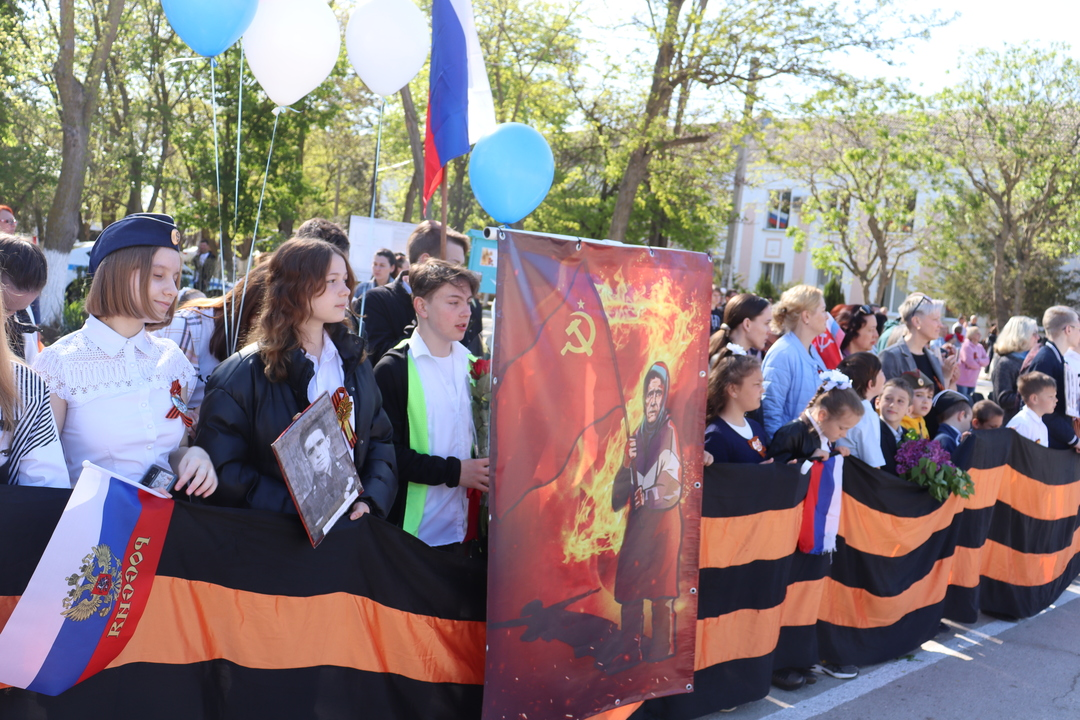
Victory Day on 9 May 2022 in Saky Raion, Russian-occupied Crimea: Artwork displaying "Babushka Z" Anna Ivanovna, an elderly Ukrainian woman who approached Ukrainian soldiers with a Soviet flag near Dvorichna in April 2022. Her shadow depicts The Motherland Calls, a Soviet-era statue memorializing the former country's civilian and military casualties during the Battle of Stalingrad in 1942 and 1943.

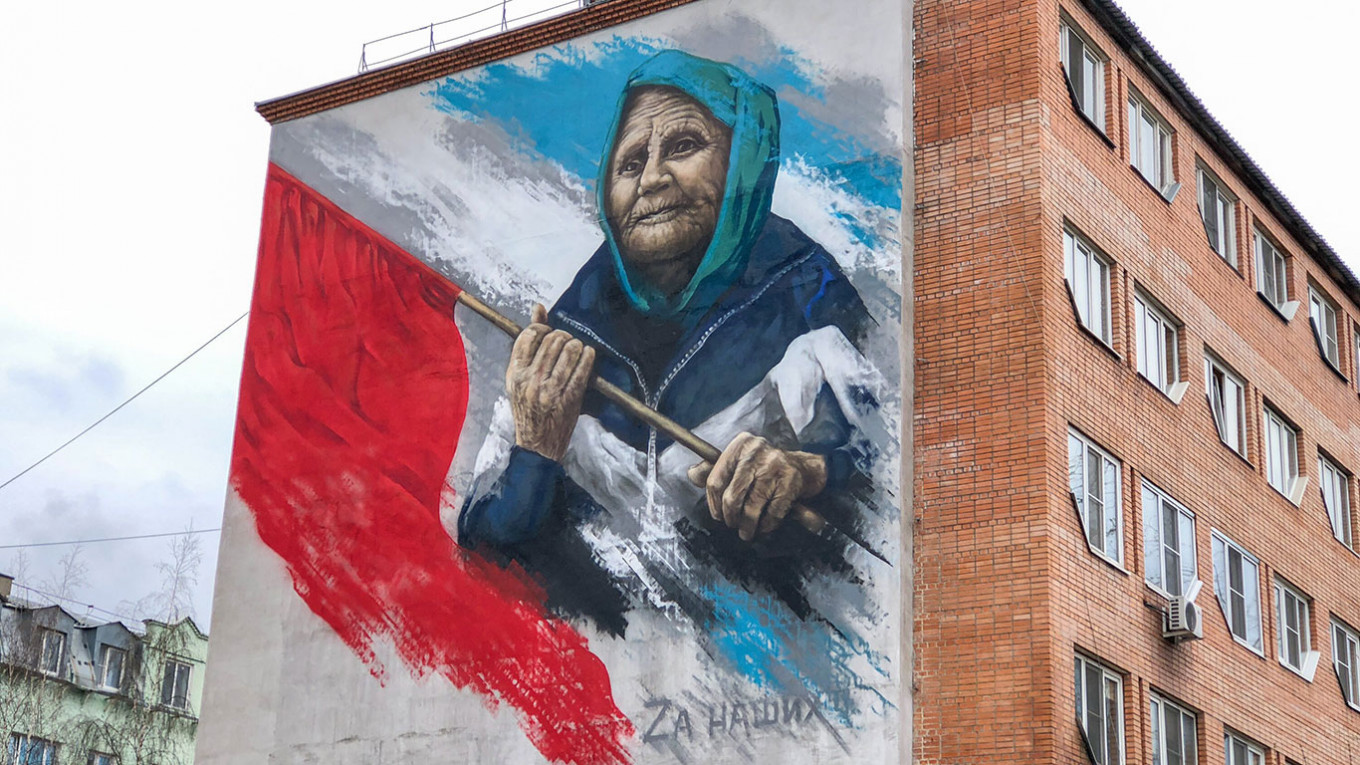
Graffiti depicting "Babushka Z" on a house in Reutov, Moscow Oblast.

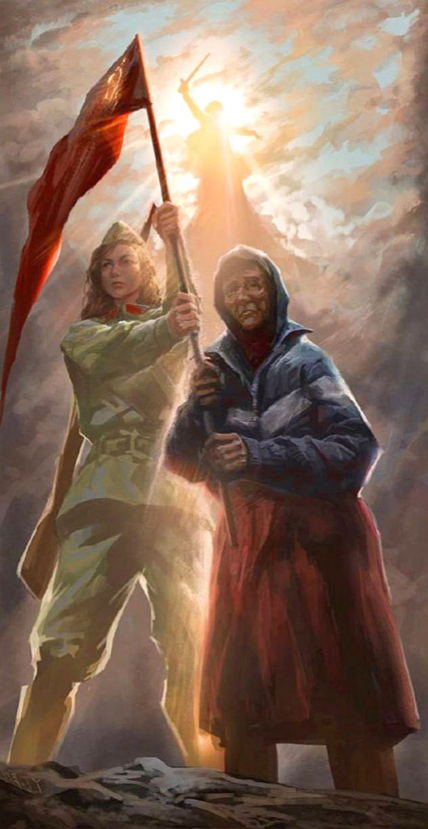
Graffiti depicting "Babushka Z" and Red Army woman soldier holding the Soviet flag, with The Motherland Calls monument in the background

=== Babushka Z ===
In April 2022, a video was filmed of an elderly Ukrainian woman named Anna Ivanovna Ivanova greeting Ukrainian soldiers while holding a Soviet flag at her home in Velyka Danylivka, saying that she and her husband had "waited, prayed for them, for Putin and all the people." The soldiers gave her food, but took the flag from her and trampled it, to which she returned the food and stated "my parents died for that flag in the Great Patriotic War." The video went viral and was featured on Russian state-controlled media, where it was cited by Russian propagandists as proof that the 2022 Russian invasion of Ukraine had popular support, in spite of the fact that most Ukrainians—even in Russian-speaking regions—opposed it. Nonetheless, in Russia, murals, postcards, street art, billboards, chevrons, and stickers depicting the woman have been created and displayed in public, and a statue of her was unveiled in Russian-occupied Mariupol. She has been nicknamed "Babushka Z" and "Babushka with a red flag" among Russian militarists. She was also referred to as "Grandma Anya" and called "a symbol of the motherland for the entire Russian world" by Russian politician Sergey Kiriyenko, who has been responsible for governing parts of occupied Ukraine.

In May 2022, Ivanova told Ukrainska Pravda that she met the Ukrainian soldiers, whom she had erroneously identified as Russian, with a Soviet flag not out of sympathy, but because she felt the need to reconcile with them so that they would not "destroy" the village and Ukraine after her house was shelled, and that she felt like a "traitor" due to the way her image was exploited by Russia. The next month, she spoke to BBC News and stated that she did not support the war but claimed that she had (mistakenly) greeted two Russian soldiers and that, at the time, she was "just happy that Russians would come and not fight with us. I was happy that we would unite again." In August 2022, she told BBC News Russian that she still lived in Velyka Danylivka and was "not going to leave anywhere." The promotion of the "Babushka with a red flag" in Russian state-controlled media almost stopped after it was discovered that Ivanova was not opposed to the Ukrainian state.

=== Russian reversal of Ukrainian decommunization ===
On 26 August 2022, Russian troops hoisted the Soviet Victory Banner in Pisky, a fortified village near Donetsk, during their attempt to push the Ukrainian military out of the Donbas.

Additionally, many Lenin statues, which had been taken down by the Ukrainians in the preceding years, were re-erected in Russian-occupied regions.

In order to counter the Russians' Soviet symbols, the Ukrainian authorities have increased decommunization efforts. In August 2023, the Soviet emblem on the Mother Ukraine Statue in Kyiv was removed and subsequently replaced by the Ukrainian coat of arms.

== See also ==
- Anti-Maidan
- Anti-Maidan (Russia)
- Decommunization in Ukraine
- Derussification in Ukraine
- Demolition of Lenin's monuments
- Demolition of Pushkin's monuments
- Communist monuments in Ukraine
- Nostalgia for the Soviet Union
- Outline of the Russo-Ukrainian war
- Ribbon of Saint George
- Russian nationalism
- Stalinobus
- Sovietization
- Soviet patriotism
- Strength is in truth
- Z (military symbol)
