= List of communist monuments in Ukraine =

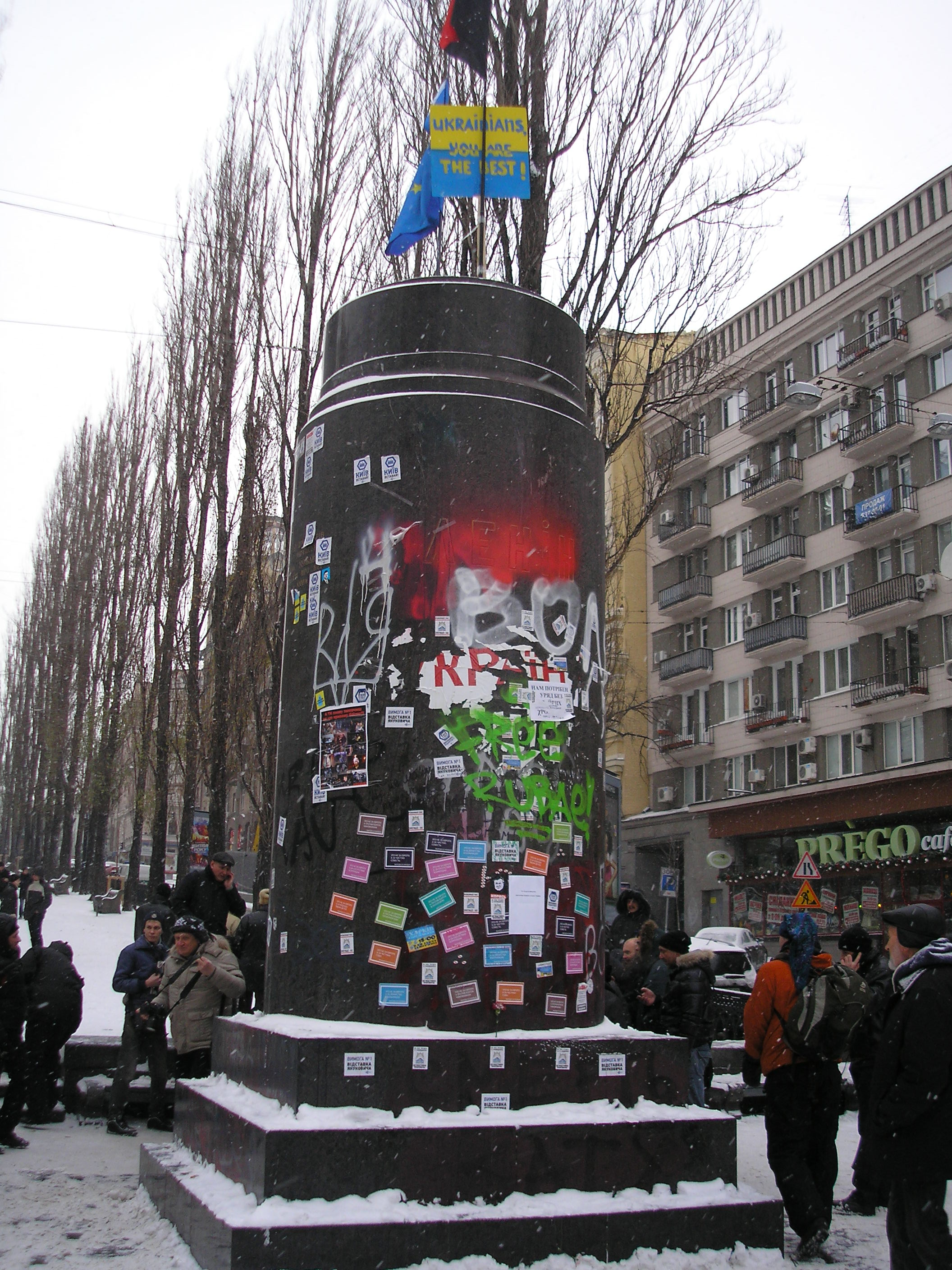
Destroyed monument of Lenin near Bessarabskyi Market in Kyiv, pulled down by demonstrators on December 8, 2013

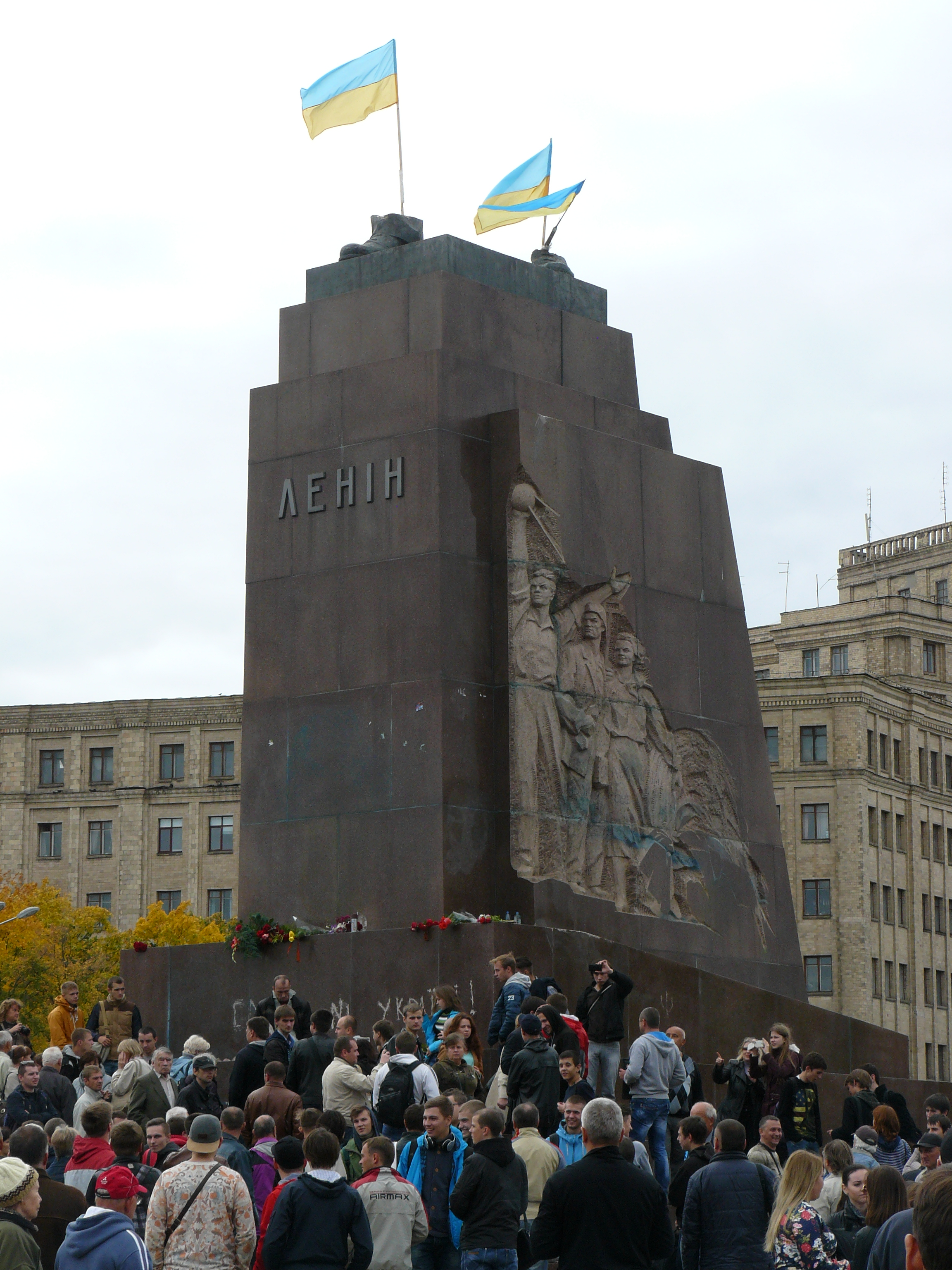
Destroyed monument of Lenin in Freedom Square, Kharkiv, pulled down by demonstrators on September 29, 2014

In Ukraine, monuments to Lenin and other Soviet-era monuments have been made illegal by Ukrainian decommunization laws that came into force on 21 May 2015. This law mandated the monuments to be removed within a six months period that started on 15 May 2015.

Since Ukrainian independence in 1991, communist monuments were already being removed and until 2014 new ones were also erected. In the aftermath of the 2013–2014 Euromaidan protests many of them were toppled. On 15 May 2015, President of Ukraine Petro Poroshenko signed the bill into law that started a six months period for the removal of the communist monuments.

During the Russian invasion of Ukraine, many of these communist statues, which had been taken down by Ukrainian activists, were re-erected by Russian occupiers in Russian-controlled areas.

== Outlawing of communist monuments ==
=== Early attempts ===
On 6 October 2009, addressing participants of the Second Ecumenical Week held in Ukrainian Catholic University, then First Lady Kateryna Yushchenko called on all Ukrainians to pull down monuments to the Communist past. According to her, the Communist regime had been consistently active in destroying the Ukrainian church. "Having destroyed age-long belief in Christ, the Communists proposed their own idols instead; the culture and faith of Ukrainians was deformed and are in need of renovation", according to Kateryna Yushchenko.

=== Pulling down of monuments ===
The removal or destruction of Lenin monuments and statues gained particular momentum during the Euromaidan movement in the beginning of 2014. Under the motto "Ленінопад" (Leninopad, translated into English as "Leninfall"), activists pulled down a dozen monuments in the Kyiv region, Zhytomyr, Khmelnytskyi, and elsewhere, or damaged them. In other cities and towns, monuments were removed by organised heavy equipment and transported to scrapyards or dumps.

By February 25, 2014, an estimate ran of over 90 statues and monuments being pulled down, removed or relocated. Since February 2014 and mid-April 2015, more than 500 statues of Lenin were dismantled in Ukraine, and nearly 1,700 were still standing.

- Pulled down:
  - Kyiv: a statue of Lenin stood in front of Bessarabskyi Market. It had been erected in 1946. On June 30, 2009, the nose of the statue and part of the left hand were destroyed. The statue was restored (at the expense of the Communist Party of Ukraine) and re-unveiled on November 27, 2009, by Petro Symonenko, leader of the Communist Party of Ukraine. During this ceremony two representatives of Svoboda threw a bottle of red paint at the monument, who were then attacked by attending Communists. The fall of the monument to Lenin in Kyiv took place on December 8, 2013.
  - Andriievo-Ivanove (Odesa Oblast): Lenin statue was broken in half on January 4, 2014.
  - Zhytomyr and Boiarka: Lenin statues were toppled by protesters on February 20, 2014.
  - Khmelnytskyi: Lenin statue was mounted from 1970 to 1992. It was designed by E. Kuntsevych, architects — O. Ihnashchenko, Ye. Perekrest. It has been relocated to the park of Culture and Recreation. On February 21, 2014, it was destroyed.
  - tens of other locations
- Removed:
  - Kyiv - on 26 August 1991 the executive committee of Kyiv voted to remove all the monuments of "Communist heroes" from public places, including the Lenin monument on the central October Revolution Square (now named Maidan Nezalezhnosti (Independence Square)).
  - Lviv, the Lenin statue was mounted from 1952 to 1990. It was designed by Sergey Merkurov, architect — I.O.Frantsuz.
  - Dnipro, 2 Lenin monuments were removed by the city in 2014; in March 2014 the city's Lenin Square was renamed "Heroes of Independence Square" in honor of the people killed during Euromaidan. The statue of Lenin on the square was removed. In June 2014 another Lenin monument was removed (parts of the monument were moved to a local history museum) and replaced by a monument for the Ukrainian military fighting against armed insurgents in the Donbas (region of Ukraine)
  - Zaporizhzhia - In March 2016, statues of Lenin, Felix Dzerzhinsky, Sergey Kirov and a Komsomol monument were removed or taken down. The statue overlooking the Dnieper Hydroelectric Station (formerly named Lenin Dam) was the largest remaining Lenin statue in Ukraine.
  - tens of other locations
- Relocated:
  - Odesa, the Lenin statue was mounted in 1967 to 2006. It was designed by Matvey Manizer, О.М.Manizer, architects — I.Ye.Rozin, Yu.S.Lapin, М.М.Volkov. It was relocated to the park of Lenin's Komsomol.
  - Sumy, the Lenin statue was mounted from 1982 to the early 2000s. It was designed by E.Kuntsevych, architects — O.Zavarov, I.Lanko. It has been relocated to the park at the city limits.
  - tens of other locations

=== Law that outlawed the monuments ===
On 9 April 2015 the Ukrainian parliament passed legislation, submitted by the Second Yatsenyuk Government, banning the promotion of symbols of “Communist and National Socialist totalitarian regimes” this means that be mid-2015 all communist monuments in Ukraine have to be removed. One of the main provisions of the bill was the recognition of the Soviet Union was "criminal" and one that it "pursued a state terror policy". On 15 May 2015 President of Ukraine Petro Poroshenko signed the bill into law; starting a six months period for the removal of the communist monuments.

In 1991 Ukraine had 5,500 Lenin monuments. By December 2015, 1,300 Lenin monuments were still standing. On 16 January 2017 the Ukrainian Institute of National Remembrance announced that 1,320 Lenin monuments were dismantled during decommunization.

== See also ==
- Fall of the monument to Lenin in Kyiv
- List of statues of Vladimir Lenin
- List of statues of Stalin
