= Anton Demidov =

Russian politician (born 1984)

Chairman of the Youn Guard of United Russia
- Incumbent
- Assumed office 16 February 2022
- Preceded by: Denis Davydov

Personal details
- Born: 7 May 1984 (age 42) Penza, Penza Oblast, USSR
- Party: United Russia
- Education: Bauman Moscow State Technical University
- Profession: Specialist in computer science
- Awards: Medal of the Order "For Merit to the Fatherland"; Letter of thanks from the President of the Russia

Anton Vyacheslavovich Demidov (Russian: Антон Вячеславович Демидов; born 7 May 1984) is a Russian politician. Chairman of the Young Guard of United Russia from 16 February 2022 year.

== Biography ==
Anton Vyacheslavovich Demidov was born on May 7, 1984 in Penza, Penza Oblast.

Graduated from Bauman Moscow State Technical University (Faculty of Computer Science and Control Systems).

He worked in the socio-political sphere, volunteered, and promoted sports and a healthy lifestyle among young people.

In 2011-2012, he was the head of the political department of the «Interregional Youth Public Movement New Generation».

In 2012-2014, he was Chairman of the Council of the interregional youth public movement for the promotion of patriotic education of youth «RUMOL».

In 2014-2018, he was Chairman of the Board of the interregional Public Foundation for the support of civil initiatives «GOROD».

In 2019-2021 — Chairman of the Council of Federal Coordinators of the public movement «Volunteer Company of the Combat Brotherhood».

In 2020-2021, he was the head of the «Street» project of the Young Guard of United Russia public organization. On October 20, 2020, he became the head of the Guard «Mobilization» project.

On November 18, 2021, he was appointed Acting Chairman of the Young Guard of United Russia.

Since December 4, 2021, he has been a member of the Presidium of the General Council of the «United Russia» party.

On February 16, 2022, he was elected chairman of the Young Guard of United Russia.

On September 11, 2022, he was elected deputy to the Legislative Assembly of Penza Oblast .

On September 21, 2022, he was elected Deputy chairman of the committee on state construction and local self-government of the legislative assembly of the Penza Oblast.

Since 2025, he has been the Vice-President of the All-Russian Sambo Federation.
