= Young Guard of United Russia =

Youth wing of the United Russia party

Young Guard of United Russia Молодая гвардия Единой России
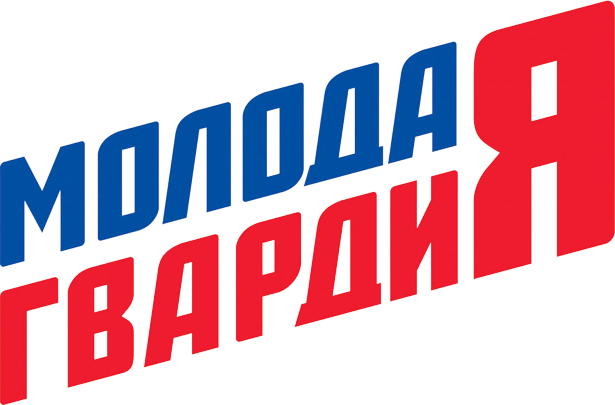
- Abbreviation: MGER
- Leader: Anton Demidov
- Founded: 15 November 2005
- Preceded by: Young Unity
- Headquarters: 129110, Moscow, Pereyaslavsky lane, 4.
- Ideology: Youth parliamentarism Conservatism; Putinism; Militarism
- Political position: Big tent
- National affiliation: United Russia
- Colours: White, Blue, Red (Russian national colors)
- Anthem: Patriots of the New Age

Party flag

Website
- mger.ru

The Young Guard of United Russia (Russian: Молодая гвардия Единой России, romanized: Molodaya gvardiya Yedinoy Rossii; MGER) is the youth wing of the United Russia party. Founded in 2005, it uses the name of the famous Young Guard, a World War II underground organization. A largely pro-Putin youth direct action group, the Young Guard claims to have 85 regional branches across Russia from Kaliningrad to Vladivostok in the far east.

The Young Guard states that it was founded to unite Russian youth and to engage young people into the social-political life of the Russian state. According to the organization, it has developed projects in many categories, e.g. "Volunteering", "Youth Electoral Campaigning", "Healthy Nation", "Accessible Environment", "Innovator", "Street Energy", 'My History', 'My Territory', "Youth Parliamentarianism", "Youth Federal Assembly", "Senses Factory", etc.

The organization has around 160,000 members. Since 2022, the chairman of its coordinating council has been Anton Demidov.

Following the Russian invasion of Ukraine in 2022, the organization shifted toward military mobilization and propaganda, deploying volunteer brigades to Russian-occupied territories of Ukraine, training drone operators, and recruiting members into the BARS "Kaskad" military unit. In September 2023, Canada imposed sanctions on the Young Guard of United Russia for its involvement in the deportation and ideological indoctrination of Ukrainian children, followed by sanctions from Ukraine and the European Union. In April 2025, the organization signed a formal cooperation agreement in Pyongyang with the Socialist Patriotic Youth League of North Korea. In October 2026, following the 2026 Russian legislative election, a leaked audio recording surfaced in which chairman Anton Demidov criticized United Russia's election campaign as "bleak" and questioned how the party's 30% rating turned into a 60% vote share.

== See also ==
- Russia under Vladimir Putin
- Young Army Cadets National Movement
- Nashi (Russian youth movement)
