= Bogdan Bulychev =

Russian journalist (born 1984)

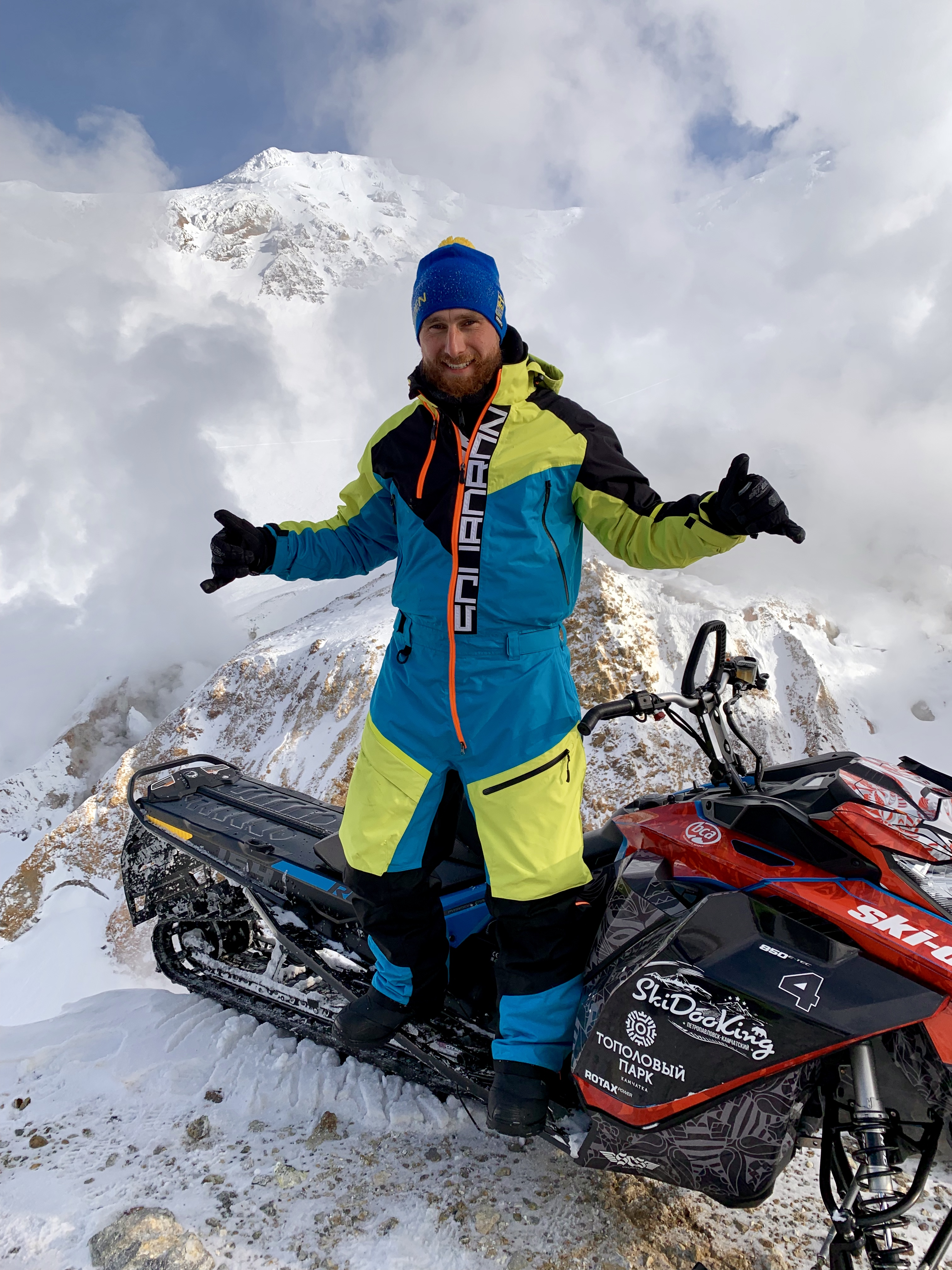
- Born: Bogdan Yuryevich Bulychev; July 12, 1984 (age 42); Magadan, Russian Soviet Federative Socialist Republic, Soviet Union
- Occupations: explorer, chief editor, blogger
- Known for: Russian Geographical Society member, expeditions organizer
- Spouse: Vladlena Bulycheva
- Children: Eseniya Bulycheva (b. 20 December 2017)

Bogdan Yuryevich Bulychev (Russian: Богдан Юрьевич Булычёв, born 12 July 1984 in Magadan) is a Russian explorer, journalist and video blogger. He is known as the expeditions center RGOexpo manager, expeditions and travel projects organizer, the chief editor and the founder of #NEW JET magazine, the founder of #NEW JET group agency. Also he is the member of the Russian Geographical Society, the Association of Polar Explorers and Yaroslavl Oblast Coordination Council on Tourism Development; he is the candidate to become Master of Sports of Russia in Greco-Roman wrestling.

== Biography ==
Bogdan was born in Magadan in the family of the medical assistant Galina Semenovna Bulycheva (born 1 January 1945) and the official Yury Evgenyevich Bulychev (born 18 November 1948). He spent his childhood in the village Milga (Yagodninsky District, Magadan Oblast). He went to high school at the village Taskan in the same district in 1991 and graduated from the Gymnasium No. 30 in Magadan in 2001.

In 2001–2003, Bulychev was a student at St. Petersburg Civil Aviation College and graduated with a major in Aviation Security. In 2008, he entered Saint Petersburg State University of Civil Aviation, the Command Faculty, and graduated in 2011 with a major in Airport Complexes Management.

Bogdan Bulychev was the vice-director of the Tunoshna Airport until 2014, then he founded the creative agency #NEW JET group (ООО «Джет»). Its activity includes producing flight books for aviation enterprises RusLine and Pskovavia, advertisement in flight newspapers and branding of the aircraft livery for civic planes. As of January 2017, Bulychev was founder and chief editor of the #NEW JET magazine.

In 2015, he founded the RGOexpo expeditions center, whose aim is to arrange expeditions and travels around Russia and the whole world. Bulychev created a series of automobile travel projects which were covered by Russian media.

== Travels and expeditions ==
=== 59 Parallel ===
This project took part in July and August 2015 and was dedicated to 170 years of Russian Geographical Society founding. The name was given after 59 parallel north, on there are the starting point (Saint Petersburg) and the ending point (Magadan) of the route. The route was done by two cars across the whole Russia. There were next cities across the route: Yaroslavl, Nizhny Novgorod, Kazan, Chelyabinsk, Yekaterinburg, Tyumen, Omsk, Nobosibirsk, Krasnoyrask, Irkutsk and Yakutsk. The documentary movie called “59 Parallel: Discovering Unknown Russia” was made after the expedition.

=== Pole of Cold ===
This expedition took part in February and March 2016 including three cars. The members started their route in Irkutsk and via several ice roads reached Russian northernmost settlement called Tiksi (shore of Laptev Sea). The column of cars has visited two settlements which pretend to be Russian “poles of cold”, Oymyakon and Verkhoyansk. The goal of the expedition was composing the detailed route for car travels in the northern part of Yakutia and propaganda of internal automobile tourism and healthy lifestyle.

Many famous Russian explorers and photo bloggers, like Sergey Dolya and Ivan Dementievsky, and the crew of TV channels Russia-1 and Auto Plus took part in this expedition, which was supported actively by the Sakha Republic Government. Two meetings with the head of the Republic Yegor Borisov were arranged, one of them involved winter fishing.

=== Eurasian Ring and speed record ===
This expedition took part from August to October 2016. The participants using one car crossed the whole Eurasia and visited 14 countries. The total length of the route exceeds 40,000 km, which is more than the diameter of the equator.

The members attempted to beat the Guinness record and travel from Lisbon to Magadan with fastest possible speed. These two cities have the biggest distance between one another in Eurasia. The start of the route was on 23 August in the center of Lisbon, the finish was on 31 August at the entrance of Magadan.

The official record is 7 days, 22 hours and 58 minutes. The latest record included into Guinness Records Book is 8 days, 13 hours and 30 minutes.

=== Into the Heart of Asia ===
The expedition took place in September and October 2017 and was supported by the Russian Geographical Society. The route of the car expedition was across six countries: Mongolia, Kazakhstan, Kyrgyzstan, Uzbekistan, Tajikistan and ending in Russia. Two biggest mountain chains, Pamir and Tian Shan, were crossed by the expedition using the stock car. The goal was popularizing the free car travels and filming the videoblog for YouTube Channel “About travels”. On 29 September, the expedition members after request from Kyrgyzstan Ministry of Emergency Situations took part in the search and rescue operation in Sary-Chelek Nature Reserve, where an Israeli tourist Hillah Livne was lost.

=== About travels to Dikson ===
In January 2018, the Arctic expedition, whose members were Bogdan Bulychev and car explorers Evgeniy Shatalov and Alexander Yelikov, took place. The expedition became the first one which reached the northernmost continental settlement in the world, urban-type settlement Dikson and got reason to acknowledge this achievement as Russian, European and Guinness record. The hardest part of the route was across the icy part of Yenisei River and Kara Sea, the return trip had to be done by the icebreaker Taymyr because of difficult weather conditions. The participants were taken aboard with cars on the ice of Kara Sea.

=== Bicycle expedition Alpari to the North Pole ===
In April 2018, Bogdan became the first person in the world who reached the North Pole by bicycle (fatbike Scott). Also another new world record was set, “the fastest travel around the world made by bicycle in the Northern Hemisphere”.

== Family ==
His wife is Vladlena Sergeevna Bulycheva (born 22 December 1991). The marriage proposal was made by Bogdan on the ice of the Laptev Sea. They have a daughter Eseniya (born 20 December 2017).

== Sources ==
- YouTube Channel Travel TV
