= Artpodgotovka =

MOD «Artpodgotovka» МОД «Артподготовка»
- Leader: Vyacheslav Maltsev
- Founded: 2013
- Banned: October 26, 2017
- Succeeded by: Party of Free People
- Headquarters: Saratov, Russia (2013–2016) "People's House" (Lokhino, Moscow Oblast), Russia (2016-2017); Paris, France (since 2017)
- Newspaper: ARTPODGOTOVKA; Leaflets «To the Police» and «To the People»
- Paramilitary wing: According to the FSB, existed. According to Maltsev, absent.
- Membership (2017): 890,000
- Ideology: Populism; National democracy Russian nationalism Left-wing nationalism Socialism; Anti-communism; Liberalism; Direct democracy
- Political position: Syncretic
- National affiliation: People's Freedom Party (2016)
- Colours: Red; White
- Slogan: "We are not waiting, but getting ready!" (Russian: "Не ждём, а готовимся!") "5/11/17!"

Website
- 5112017.org

Artpodgotovka (Russian: Межрегиональное общественное движение «Артподготовка»; Mezhregionalnoye obshchestvennoye dvizheniye «Artpodgotovka»), Russian for "Artillery - or art - preparation" and known in English as the Interregional Social Movement 'Artpodgotovka') is a Russian political organization of a left-wing nationalist character. It is designated as both an extremist and terrorist organization and banned on the territory of the Russian Federation.

== Ideology ==
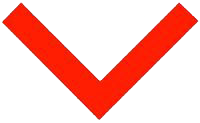
Logo of Artpodgotovka

In different periods of its existence, the organization had a completely polar ideology based on the principles of direct democracy with a clearly expressed anti-communism. At the time of its foundation, it was far-right after becoming partially liberal. As Artpodgotovka is a horizontal, decentralized political association, its ideology was different in different regions. The main thesis of the Artpodgotovka ideology was the belief in the inevitability of the revolution on November 5, 2017.

== Legal status ==
The MOD (Interregional Public Movement) "Artpodgotovka" was not officially registered. Having a horizontal structure, it had a different, sometimes only similar ideology in different regions, in some regions there was their own symbolics.

However, despite this, on October 26, 2017, the Krasnoyarsk Regional Court recognized the MOD "Artpodgotovka" as extremist and banned its activities on the territory of the Russian Federation.

== History ==
=== Foundation (2013) ===
Initially, the name "Artpodgotovka" was used by Maltsev as the name of an art group in Saratov (since 2004). In 2011, together with Babajanyan, Maltsev chose this name as the name of a political Twitter blog, where Maltsev's audience was just under 25,000 people. At the end of 2011, Vyacheslav Maltsev made a decision to create a YouTube channel "ARTPODGOTOVKA", on which on weekdays at 21.00 Moscow time the political program "Bad News" was aired in a live format. Soon, his internet audience grew into a whole movement. An unregistered organization, the MOD "Artpodgotovka", began to form. The organization did not have unified attributes, each region used its own symbols, although all the symbols of "Artpodgotovka" were united by the presence of the red "V" symbol.

=== Blog «ARTPODGOTOVKA» ===
In 2011, the Twitter blog was reborn into a YouTube blog, which was published daily on weekdays. The average transmission length is one and a half to two hours. When the blog was banned in October 2017, the number of its subscribers reached more than 130,000 people. The streams were getting 100,000-400,000 views.

There were completely opposite opinions about Maltsev's blog, for example, the Russian opposition leader Alexei Navalny wrote the following about Artpodgotovka:

«The Maltsev broadcast and the movement around him in general is a very interesting phenomenon. The person has nothing to do with the Moscow political get-together and does not seem to be advanced in technology. However, he managed to organize cheap but effective broadcasting throughout the country. Every day it goes live with an hour and a half program, which is watched by 100-150 thousand people, which is comparable in audience with a federal radio station. Yabloko, PARNAS - these are sites with a traffic of a couple of thousand people a day. Well, there are Facebook pages, Yavlinsky has the biggest one, 52 thousand likes. Even parliamentary parties with hundreds of millions of rubles do not have such an information channel. The most important thing is that this thing is completely uncensored, Maltsev says what he wants, the government is concealing it in direct terms and no administration can block it. It is very interesting. I noticed that some in Moscow have a snobbish attitude towards Maltsev and his channel, it's in vain. A person has achieved what editorial offices with dozens of journalists cannot get, which means that his experience must be studied and implemented. Reduce the cost of work, and not continue to run around the oligarchs with leaflets-estimates for huge numbers. We are now thinking about launching such a channel. I can't pull it every day, but once a week you can try».

=== 2016 Russian legislative election ===
In the period from 2013 to 2016, Maltsev "existed" only within the framework of the virtual Internet field.

In April 2016, Maltsev announced his candidacy for the primaries of the democratic party PARNAS, where he took 1st place, with a margin of several thousand votes. This caused great contradictions in the leadership of the PARNAS party. So, a member of the political council of the party, Ilya Yashin, said the following at the party congress:

«I did not have a position on Maltsev until yesterday, - said Ilya Yashin. - He spoke yesterday at the political council, he was very convincing, and I had no reason to support him. He opened his mouth - and such a fetid cloaca poured on us all ... About the Jewish mafia, the Masonic conspiracy, about the fact that Vladimir Kara-Murza was poisoned not for political reasons, but for everyday life ... I'm surprised that a man in the spirit of Zhirinovsky is being imposed on us».

In the summer of 2016, a team began to form around Maltsev, volunteers appeared in the regions. The audience of Maltsev's YouTube channel increased sharply after he stated the following on television:

«The boyars are to blame, and the tsar is wonderful. If the king does not know what is happening in the country, he should be put in a madhouse. If he knows and does not interfere with this, he should be sent to prison. If he knows and promotes, such kings should be impaled.».

Immediately after the resonant statements of the leader of "Artpodgotovka" on Russian television, both representatives of the opposition movements and ardent guardians began to criticize him. For example, the leader of the biker club "Night Wolves" Alexander "Ths Surgeon" Zaldostanov said the following about the candidate for the State Duma:

Of course, we will ask him for this, for such things we have to ask. And we will hang him by his tongue for this. "He suggested that" as soon as we take and put him on a stake for real, immediately everyone will forget about what he called for. ".

Shortly before the elections on September 18, a revealing film about Maltsev and "Artpodgotovka" was released on the federal channel REN TV

=== Opposition walks and MOD «Artpodgotovka» ===
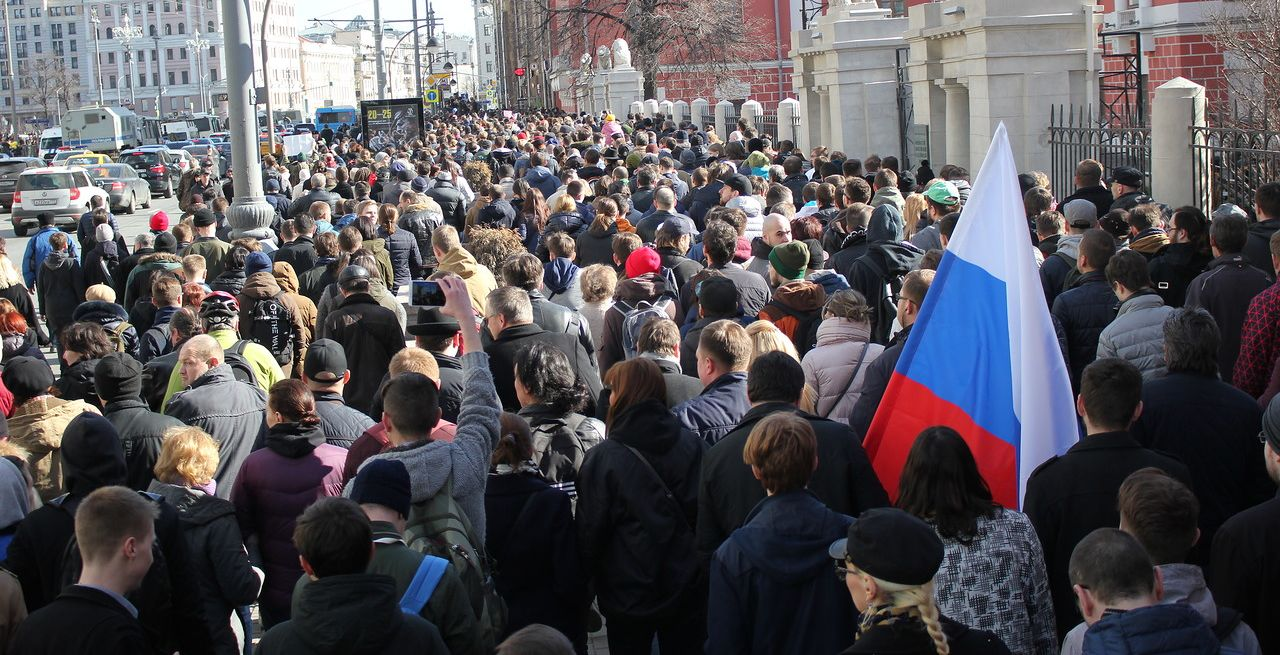
Opposition walk in Moscow. March 26. 2017

==== Opposition walks ====
For the first time, Vyacheslav Maltsev spoke about the opposition's walks in his program "Bad News". This idea was supported by Dmitry Demushkin, Mark Galperin and Ivan Beletsky. After the failure of the PARNAS in the elections to the State Duma, on September 19, Mark Galperin and Ivan Beletsky founded the New Opposition movement, which was later joined by Vyacheslav Maltsev. As a result, on October 8, 2016, the first opposition walk took place in Moscow. In his blog, Maltsev urged people to organize similar actions in their regions. At the end of October, the walk took place in St. Petersburg, after which the walks began in Yekaterinburg and Novosibirsk. In December 2016, walks began in Krasnoyarsk, Irkutsk. The average number of participants in the actions in the regions is about 30 people. However, in some cases, activity could be observed in 50, or even 100 people. As of April 1, 2017, all walks take place in more than 110 cities of the Russian Federation

Around the same time, according to a source close to the leadership of the movement, provocateurs were introduced into Artpodgotovka, as well as snitches from the ranks of the activists.

==== MOD "Artpodgotovka" ====
The activists of the movement attended various opposition actions, issued a number of brochures, leaflets and posters. Their own pickets were organized in the capital and regions. The movement (especially in the regions, at the "grassroots" level) tried to cooperate with various opposition organizations of different directions (from left movements to ultra-right organizations).

===== Opinions about Artpodgotovka =====
Pavel Chikov, a lawyer and head of the international human rights group Agora, characterizes this movement as follows:

"The political program" Artpodgotovka "consists of 22 points and smacks of open populism. Old and not very good socialism and nationalism in one bottle. Social base - 30-50 year olds. Not beggars, but also not the middle class, primarily in the regions. This is a Russian version of American white supremacists, who quickly burst into politics in the wake of Donald Trump's rhetoric. This is a fairly numerous stratum, whose youth fell on the 1980s and 1990s, who absorbed political freedoms, but never took place in life. This potentially protest electorate, blaming the corrupt officials, immigrants from Central Asia, Jews for their own failures, was not embraced by any non-systemic opposition movement. During 2017, his supporters began to actively "stick" to Navalny's headquarters created throughout the country, and they were noticeable around the regional branches of Open Russia. They were attracted by street protest activity - in fact, the only possible form of activity for non-systemic oppositionists. Coordinators, allegedly appointed by Maltsev, but without clear powers, began to appear in the regions without a clear order. Funding was also not transparent. The first large-scale street activity "Artpodgotovka" took place on March 26 - an action against corruption organized by Alexei Navalny. At the same time, the first administrative arrests took place. During the year, the main activist of the movement in the regions had already gathered for "repeated" violations, and the courts began to impose large fines of 150-200 thousand rubles, and the police - to demand from the ICR to initiate appropriate criminal cases for "systematic violations" of the procedure for holding demonstrations. ".

===== The paramilitary wing and communication with the "Network" group =====
In February 2018, the Federal Security Service announced the prevention of a number of high-profile terrorist attacks throughout Russia, as well as the detention of members of the "Network" group. According to law enforcement officers, the group consisted of two conspiratorial cells - "Voskhod" and "5/11". However, as it turned out later, the "Network" cell "5/11" got its name not because of its connection with the "Artpodgotovka" MOD and the so-called "Revolution 5/11/17", but because its members wore clothes of the brand of the same name.

As it turned out later, those involved in this case are not supporters of "Artpodgotovka". The detainees turned out to be anarchists and anti-fascists.

Journalists of the REN TV channel wrote in the fall of 2016 that Artpodgotovka was preparing an armed uprising. It was reported that the activists sew chevrons, similar to the chevrons of the Ukrainian extremist organization "Right Sector". A video of the negotiations between Maltsev, Gorsky and Demushkin was also published.

===== Political action "5/11/17" =====
The leader of the movement, Vyacheslav Maltsev, from the very beginning assured his supporters that a revolution would take place in Russia in the fall of 2017. In 2014, he set an exact date - November 5, 2017.

From the very morning on November 5, 2017, the central streets of the capital were filled with paddy wagons accompanied by riot police officers. In Moscow, more than 1,000 people took part in the so-called "revolution 5/11/17", of whom over 260 were detained. A quarter of those detained are underage. According to media reports, many of the detainees were casual passers-by, or politicized citizens who wanted to "see the movement."

The leader of the MOD "Artpodgotovka", in an interview with Meduza's correspondent, commented on the incident as follows:

«The regime has shown its fascist essence. Both the police and the FSB exceeded their powers. Nearly ten-year-olds were detained».

The actions were also held in St. Petersburg, Saratov, Krasnodar, Krasnoyarsk, Perm, Rostov-on-Don. They accounted for about 200 arrests.

=== Organization ban (2017) ===
On October 26, 2017, the Krasnoyarsk Regional Court declared the MOD Artpodgotovka extremist. Since November, mass detentions of Maltsev's supporters began throughout the country; in total, more than 30 criminal cases have been opened in Russia against the participants in the movement.

Activists of the Vyacheslav Maltsev movement were also persecuted: In the Krasnoyarsk Territory, they detained Maltsev's supporters Roman Maryan and Pyotr Isaev, who were on the train to Moscow to take part in the protest on November 5, but were detained by police and the FSB. On November 2, a search was carried out in the apartment of Sergei Ryzhov, a Saratov supporter, and 200 grams of TNT and 5 Molotov cocktails were found. The detainee claims that explosive substances were planted on him during a search of the apartment. A criminal case has been initiated against him under Article 205 of the Criminal Code of the Russian Federation "Terrorism". On November 3, 2017, at the request of the General Prosecutor's Office of the Russian Federation dated October 31, 2017, numerous communities of Vyacheslav's supporters and participants in Artpodgotovka were blocked on the VKontakte social network. Also on November 3, in Moscow, the FSB, together with Centre E detained the participants of the "Artpodgotovka", cold weapons and Molotov cocktails were seized. The detainees allegedly intended to set fire to administrative buildings and attack the police on November 4 and 5. Criminal cases were initiated under Article 205 of the Criminal Code of the Russian Federation "Terrorism". Vyacheslav Maltsev called the detention of his supporters a "dirty provocation":

There is no organization, there is the Artpodgotovka channel, in which I broadcast every evening. We have supporters, spectators. But such people are half of Russia. Some of my programs are watched by five million people. And this is just the "Artpodgotovki" group. Do I issue any documents? We don't even know who they are detaining. And if they catch someone there, plant, beat and try to stop my activity in this way, they will not stop it. They talk about terrorist attacks, explosions - all this is Putin's dirty KGB provocation.

The participants in the movement were detained as especially dangerous. The operatives were supported by special forces groups of the FSB and OMON. In Moscow, to get into the apartment of the Revolutionaries, a window was blown up. In Saint Petersburg, Krasnoyarsk, Saratov, several groups of FSB special forces were used.

According to the official position of law enforcement agencies, the "Artpodgotovka" movement was preparing an armed uprising and a violent seizure of power.

==== Opinions about the objectivity of the ban on "Artpodgotovka" and the arrest of its supporters ====
Kirill Bragin, head of the Novosibirsk branch of the Russian People's Council, considers the following about the Artpodgotovka MOD:

"The Artpodgotovka movement, which was banned in Russia, was a real opposition organization. Artpodgotovka does not have many activists, their number is measured not in thousands, but in hundreds throughout Russia. But these are ideological people, they themselves raised funds for their activities, inside their cells, regularly held actions. There gathered people who hate the current situation, they were already disgusted, they were determined. This does not mean that they were going to commit violent acts, but were willing to participate in unauthorized actions. For the authorities, "Artillery preparation", of course, is a danger. On the other hand, the emergence of such organizations testifies to the fact that Russia has an authoritarian political system. In the European political system, opposition organizations of this kind would function calmly in the legal field, take part in elections, accumulating votes dissatisfied with the political establishment, and would pass to parliaments - municipal and national. But it turns out that really existing organizations, in the end, go towards more radical actions ", — wrote a public figure.

Political scientist Ivan Preobrazhensky said about the arrests of members of the movement:

«It should be understood that the investigative bodies and special services carried out a successful operation and are now preparing a new large-scale trial for the March presidential elections. Thanks to the deliberate or accidental provocation of blogger Maltsev, in the near future we may see a process on a larger scale than the so-called "Swamp affair". So it's too early to laugh. First, we must try to save those who were enrolled in the ranks of the fictional extremist organization. And then, if it turns out better than with those arrested after the opposition rally on May 6, 2012, it will be possible to laugh together», - said the political scientist.

Oppositionist Alexei Navalny said in his video blog about the arrests of Maltsev's supporters:

Maltsev's supporters are being crushed, they are trying to destroy. Criminal cases are now being massively fabricated against the activists of "Artpodgotovka", moreover, they are doing it all over the country and using rather "clumsy" methods: they throw in TNT, some kind of explosive, Molotov cocktails. Such actions are nothing more than an attempt to eliminate the leaders, intimidate them, by planting evidence and fabricating cases, to exclude other activists from the game. This behavior of "those in power", they always do it ", - said the politician.

== Artpodgotovka in culture ==
=== Documentaries ===
- Ren-TV's film «Gotcha!», Released in September 2016. In the film, the movements "Artpodgotovka" and Vyacheslav Maltsev are shown in a negative context.

== Slogans ==
- "5/11/17" is the main slogan of Vyacheslav Maltsev's movement, which was massively distributed by the supporters of Artillery Preparation on the World Wide Web and "offline". Not a single broadcast of Artpodgotovka took place without repeated pronunciation of this slogan. Activists shouted him at rallies, pickets and processions. The slogan was actively applied to banknotes, buildings, etc.
- "We are not waiting, but getting ready!" - one of the main slogans of the "Artpodgotovka" movement. Subsequently, he became a joke phrase that is actively used in the Russian political environment.
