= Vyacheslav Maltsev =

Russian politician (born 1964)

- Вячеслав Мальцев
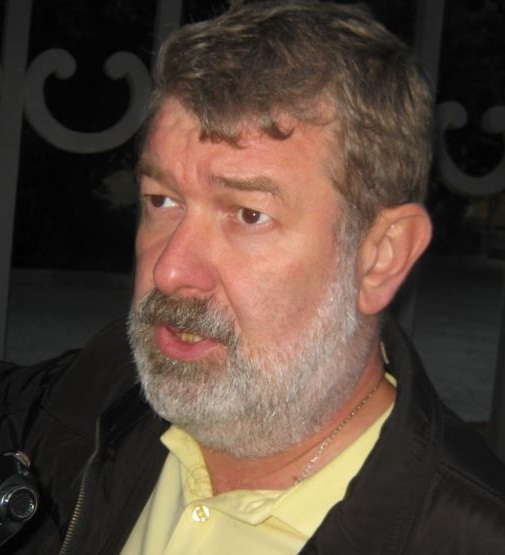
- Maltsev in 2016

Deputy Chairman of the Saratov Oblast Duma
- In office 1996–2007

Deputy of the Saratov Oblast Duma
- In office 1994–2007

Personal details
- Born: Vyacheslav Vyacheslavovich Maltsev; June 7, 1964 (age 62) Saratov, Russian SFSR, Soviet Union
- Party: United Russia (2001–2003); Free People's Party (since 2017)
- Spouse: Anna Maltseva
- Children: 3
- Education: Saratov State Academy of Law

Military service
- Allegiance: Soviet Union
- Branch/service: KGB Border Troops → Ministry of Internal Affairs
- Years of service: 1985–1989
- Rank: Sergeant

Vyacheslav Vyacheslavovich Maltsev (Russian: Вячеслав Вячеславович Мальцев; born 7 June 1964) is a Russian politician, three-time member of the Saratov regional Duma (elected in 1994, 1997 and 2002). He is an active blogger, the author and host of the Russian language news program 'Bad News' on a YouTube channel Artpodgotovka ("preliminary bombardment").

In May 2016 Maltsev won the primary elections of the People's Freedom Party, PARNAS and was granted a 2nd place on the party's election list for the 2016 Russian State Duma elections.

== Biography ==
Vyacheslav Maltsev was born on June 7, 1964, in Saratov. In 1981, he graduated from secondary school No. 8, after which Maltsev worked as a statistician in the Kirov district Committee of the Komsomol and enrolled in the evening department of the Saratov State Law Academy. In 1982–1985, he served in the border troops, after which he transferred to the full-time department of the institute. In 1987 he graduated from the Saratov Law Institute. After studying, in 1987 he got a job in the police as a district inspector of the Factory police department, but in 1989 he quit because police officers began to be sent to disperse rallies.

On October 18, 1989, he established the Allegro security agency, and served as General Director until 1996. According to Vyacheslav, his agency employed two thousand employees. At that time, he was supposedly one of the richest people in the Saratov region. Subsequently, Maltsev stated that he had sold all his property. Since 2019, he has been a member of the Board of the International Association "Institute of National Policy".

=== Political activity ===
In May 1994, Maltsev was elected deputy of the Saratov Regional Duma of the first convocation, and then – in August 1997 and September 2002 – he was re-elected. He headed the committee on legality and combating crime, after which he became secretary of the Duma. In 1995, he participated in the elections to the State Duma in the Engel's electoral district No. 159, according to the results of which he won 18.5% of the votes. He was ahead of the candidate from the Communist Party of the Russian Federation Oleg Mironov. He was a deputy of the Saratov Regional Duma until 2007.

In the 1990s Vyacheslav Maltsev was a member of the Fatherland - All Russia party, then in 2001, when the political blocs "Unity" and "Fatherland – all Russia" merged with each other to create the Saratov cell of the United Russia Party, Vyacheslav became its member, but left the party in 2003.

In November 2003, Vyacheslav Maltsev, together with the former secretary of the Regional Security Council Alexander Miroshin, founded the "Anti-Ayatskov Foundation". The purpose of the foundation was to remove Dmitry Ayatskov from the post of Governor of the Saratov region. The "Anti-Ayatskov Foundation" collected signatures against the governor, picketed and staged hunger strikes. One of the rallies against Ayatskov was held in Moscow opposite the presidential administration building, where Maltsev brought his supporters by bus.

In 2006, Maltsev organized the Fridtjof Nansen Foundation and became its president. Vyacheslav organized this foundation in order to gather like-minded people and achieve the construction of a monument to Nansen Fritjof. A place was chosen for the monument on an island in the city park, but the Saratov authorities did not allow him to do this.

In 2007, he headed the department of "Great Russia" in Saratov, in the same year he created a branch of Mikhail Kasyanov's RNDS in the city.

At the beginning of 2007, Maltsev, as a deputy of the Saratov Regional Duma, proposed amendments to the laws "On Guarantees of Electoral Rights" and "On State Civil Service", according to which a citizen nominating for election or wishing to become an official had to indicate his sexual orientation in the questionnaire.

In October 2011, in the evening in Saratov, Bunyatov inflicted a fractured jaw and a closed head injury on Maltsev in a fight, and he shot him with a traumatic pistol, which led to injuries to both thighs.

In 2012, Maltsev tried to run for deputy of the Regional Duma from the Communist Party of the Russian Federation in one of the single-mandate districts in Saratov, but lost to the representative of United Russia Alexey Mazepov (63.76% of the votes), Maltsev was preferred by 21.41% of those who voted.

Maltsev claims that the elections were rigged, and the victory should have gone to him.

=== Nomination to the State Duma (2016) ===
On the eve of the elections to the Russian legislative election, Maltsev decided to participate in the Primary election of the PARNAS party. The first place in the federal list by default went to the party leader Mikhail Kasyanov, the composition and order of the rest of the list was supposed to be determined by voting registered on the "Wave of Changes" website of voters. Voting was launched on May 28, 2016, and was supposed to stop on May 29 at 21:00. However, it was suspended until the scheduled date, as a link to the database with personal data of voters suddenly appeared on the PARNAS website. The party leadership called the incident a "hackers' attack" and apologized to the affected users. At the time of the voting stoppage, Maltsev occupied the first place by a large margin, 5,471 votes were cast for him. The second position was held by Andrey Zubov with 1665 votes. According to PARNAS members Natalia Pelevina and Ilya Yashin, Maltsev's victory should have been explained by the low turnout and the fact that the Saratov blogger managed to mobilize his like-minded people. Yashin noted that it was not party supporters who voted for Maltsev, but his own audience.

Despite the fact that the primaries were disrupted and actually did not take place, it was decided to take into account their results. Part of the party leadership was dissatisfied with Maltsev's victory. At the PARNAS congress on July 2, 2016, a third of the party members voted against his nomination from PARNAS, including its deputy chairmen Ilya Yashin, Vladimir Kara-Murza and a number of other members of the federal political council. Yashin and the leader of the St. Petersburg branch of the party, Andrei Pivovarov, speaking to the audience, expressed concern that "in the race for populism", PARNAS could lose part of its electorate, and he would prefer to vote for Yabloko. The majority of the leaders of the regional branches of the party spoke in support of Maltsev. In total, 78 votes were cast for the Saratov politician at the congress, 45 against. Following the results of the congress, the federal troika of PARNAS was formed: Mikhail Kasyanov – Vyacheslav Maltsev – Andrey Zubov.

A source of "Novaya Gazeta" in the leadership of PARNAS called Maltsev's nomination a political suicide for the party. Konstantin Merzlikin, deputy chairman of the PARNAS party, noted in a comment to the same publication that the party, approving Maltsev's candidacy, relies on a right—liberal, "to a certain extent nationalistic" audience - as opposed to the left-liberal "Yabloko". Commenting on the goals of his nomination to the State Duma, Maltsev himself said that he intends to contribute to the abolition of unconstitutional laws and make the State Duma impeach President Putin.

Maltsev's election program included the removal from power of Putin and his entourage, followed by a tribunal; ending aggressive wars and signing a peace treaty with Ukraine; expanding the powers of local self-government; electability of prosecutors, judges and police chiefs; economic amnesty; securing a share of national wealth for each citizen; increasing the openness of authorities; the introduction of digital currency and the transition to direct democracy.

Mark Galperin and Vyacheslav Maltsev. Broadcast on the YouTube channel "Artpodgotovka" on March 27, 2017, the day after the protests

Maltsev joined the officially unformed "New Opposition" movement, which was created by Mark Galperin. It carries out political struggle mainly through street actions, including through rallies and walks (a new type of protest actions popularized by the "New Opposition"), which took place every Sunday on the streets of many Russian cities. Musician and public figure Artemy Troitsky considers Maltsev an inconvenient opponent for the Kremlin and calls him the second oppositionist in Russia after Alexei Navalny.

=== Persecution of Maltsev ===
==== Arrest ====
On April 13, 2017, Maltsev was detained in his Saratov apartment, where a search was conducted after that. The Basmanny Court of Moscow said that the search took place as part of the investigation of a criminal case of an attack by unknown persons on a representative of the authorities during an anti-corruption rally on March 26, in which Maltsev participated. However, supporters of the politician expressed confidence that the real reason was connected with Maltsev's political activities. At the airport, where he was supposed to be transferred to Moscow, Vyacheslav had a heart attack. The court session was held in the Tverskoy Court on April 14. The court accused Maltsev of an administrative offense – disobeying police officers at an anti-corruption rally on March 26 in Moscow and decided to send him under arrest for 15 days.

During an anti-corruption speech on June 12, Maltsev was detained in the center of Moscow, the next day the politician was sent under arrest for 10 days for disobeying police officers.

==== Emigration and criminal case ====
In late June – early July 2017, Maltsev left Russia due to the initiation of a criminal case against him under the article "Creation of an extremist community". In July of the same year, Maltsev announced the creation of the "Party of Free People". At the same time, the Moscow department of the FSB of Russia accused the politician in absentia of calling for extremism. Later it became known that he was in France. Meanwhile, Maltsev continues to broadcast "Artpodgotovka".

On October 10, Maltsev was arrested in absentia and put on the international wanted list on charges under the article "Public calls for extremist activity". The verdict was rendered by the Meshchansky court of Moscow. On October 26, the court recognized the "Artillery Preparation" movement as an extremist organization and banned its operation on the territory of Russia. Currently lives in France.

In 2021, the Federal Security Service (FSB) of Russia included the community "Artpodgotovka" No. 35 in the list of terrorist organizations.

== Blog "Artpodgotovka" ==
In December 2011, Maltsev began hosting the political channel "Artpodgotovka" on YouTube, the popularity of which increased dramatically after the elections to the State Duma. The main part of the content consists of the releases of the "Bad News" program, which airs on weekdays at 21:00. They are Maltsev's monologues on the topic of the latest news from Russia and the world. Periodically on his channel he holds debates and joint broadcasts with his supporters, as well as various public and political figures (for example, Stanislav Belkovsky, Stepan Demura, Dmitry Demushkin, Dmitry Ivanov, Olga Li, Alexey Navalny, Alexey Venediktov). Also at the "Artpodgotovka" there was a system of "revcoins", in which points are awarded on a virtual account every day, which after the onset of "democracy" will be transferred to all donors and supporters of Vyacheslav in real money.

In fact, a whole political movement "Artpodgotovka" took shape around Maltsev, the most used slogan of Vyacheslav and supporters of "Artpodgotovka": "We are not waiting, but we are preparing", which called for preparing for protests on November 5, 2017.

The YouTube channel "Artpodgotovka" on the eve of the November 5 protests on the night of November 4 was blocked for Russian citizens, the videos were not deleted.

Currently, Maltsev continues to release the program "Bad News" on his video blog .

== Persecution of supporters of "Centre for Combating Extremism" ==
Activists of the Vyacheslav Maltsev movement themselves were also persecuted: In the Krasnoyarsk region, a supporter was detained who was traveling by train to Moscow to take part in a protest on November 5, but was detained by police officers.

On November 2, a search was conducted in the apartment of a Saratov supporter, 200 grams of TNT and 5 molotov cocktails were found. The detainee claims that explosive substances were planted to him during the search of the apartment. A criminal case has been initiated against him under Article 205 of the Criminal Code of the Russian Federation "Terrorism".

On November 3, 2017, numerous communities of supporters of Vyacheslav and participants of the "Artpodgotovka" were blocked on the VKontakte social network at the request of the Prosecutor General's Office of the Russian Federation on October 31, 2017. Also on November 3 in Moscow, the FSB, together with the Centre for Combating Extremism, detained the participants of the "Artpodgotovka", cold weapons and molotov cocktails were seized. The detainees allegedly planned to set fire to administrative buildings and attack the police on November 4 and 5. Criminal cases were initiated under Article 205 of the Criminal Code of the Russian Federation "Terrorism".

On February 27, 2018, arms dealers were detained by FSB officers in Kaluga. During the search, 27 firearms, more than 200 rounds of ammunition, explosive devices, as well as anti-government leaflets and "Artpodgotovka" paraphernalia were found in March 2018, the human rights organization Memorial recognized a supporter of "Artpodgotovka" Roman Maryan as a political prisoner. In 2017, Roman was arrested on suspicion of preparing mass riots. Members of the organization "New Greatness" who met each other in the Telegram chat "Artpodgotovka" were also arrested. They were accused of creating an extremist community.

On October 4, 2019, the Rostov Regional Court found 24-year-old Vladislav Mordasov and 19-year-old Yan Sidorov guilty of "organizing mass riots" and sentenced them to 6 years and 7 months and 6.5 years in prison, respectively. On November 5, 2017, Mordasov and Sidorov together went to the Soviets Square in Rostov-on-Don to the House of Soviets of the Rostov region with posters "Return the land to the Rostov fire victims" and "The Government resigns", after which they were detained. According to the prosecution's version, they allegedly were going to arrange mass riots on Sovetov Square, arrange "arson, pogroms, destroy property", "inflict bodily harm" to police officers and other authorities, seize the administration building of the Rostov region. Mordasov and Sidorov complained of beatings and torture after their detention.

== "Revolution" November 5, 2017 ==
Maltsev, in his speeches since 2013, talked about the inevitable revolution in Russia, setting a date for its start on November 5, 2017 (his supporters called the revolution "5.11.17"). On this day, he called on his supporters to speak in the central squares of the cities, protest against the current government and seize power in the people's hands. For its calls to overthrow the government, the RF IC initiated a criminal case against Maltsev, the organization "Artillery Preparation" was recognized as extremist, and its members were detained in the fall of 2017.

Sergei Ryzhov, a supporter of Maltsev, was detained on November 1, 2017, for preparing a terrorist attack in Saratov – Vyacheslav Maltsev's hometown. He has been in jail for more than three years.

On November 5, 2017, many police, the "Okhotny Ryad" station was blocked. The police conducted random searches of citizens, many were taken away in motor vehicles. At 13:00, 82 people were detained in Moscow, according to OVD-Info. 2 people were detained in St. Petersburg, 4 in Krasnoyarsk. A representative of Echo of Moscow was also detained. Later, 10 more people were detained in St. Petersburg near the Smolny Institute.

At 14:00, TASS announced that the number of detainees had increased to 200 people on Manezhnaya Square in Moscow.

At 16:00, it became known about more than 300 detainees. Several detainees were charged under Article 205 of the Criminal Code of the Russian Federation "Preparation of a terrorist attack", a revolver the Nagant M1895, a grenade and explosives were found in their car; human rights activist Dinar Idrisov claims that weapons and explosive objects were planted by law enforcement officers .

At 21:00, according to OVD-Info, the number of detainees increased to 448 people. The most arrests took place in Moscow – 339, in St. Petersburg 21 people, according to unconfirmed reports, 49 of them are minors. There were about 112 people left to spend the night in police departments on the night of November 6.

== Political views ==
1. Vyacheslav Maltsev calls himself a national democrat and adheres to the ideas of direct democracy. In order to establish a direct democracy Maltsev proposes to install webcameras in cabinets and apartments of all state officials including ministers, members of Parliament etc. and to bestow on every citizen the right to control the work of the state and its representatives via the Internet. According to Maltsev electronic elections should also be widely accepted.
2. Cancellation of the anti-constitutional laws such as the Yarovaya Law and many others.
3. Protection of Human Rights and Freedoms.
4. Stands on the principles of "Freedom of speech", "Freedom of religion" and more.
5. Advocate for cooperation with NATO to resist China's desire to seize some lands of Siberia and Far East.

== Criticism ==
On August 22, 2016, during the first election debate on the Rossiya-1 TV channel, Maltsev, representing PARNAS, made a number of harsh statements against President Putin. Despite the fact that the topic of the debate was the Russian economy, Maltsev focused on criticizing the head of state. He stressed that "every vote for PARNAS is a vote against Putin," and promised to initiate impeachment proceedings if the party passes the State Duma. The politician also linked problems in the Russian economy with Putin's personality, stating the need to "remove from power the main brake that hinders our economy"

A well-known Putin supporter, the leader of the Night Wolves biker club, Alexander "Surgeon" Zaldostanov, said that he would "ask" Maltsev for these words and "hang him by the tongue" As soon as we take him and put him on a stake for real, immediately everyone will forget about what he called for," the "Surgeon" said. Nikolay Levichev, a member of the CEC from Fair Russia, expressed the opinion that the police should be called for the proposal to "impale an opponent" and "take a man in handcuffs off the air". A source in the PARNAS party told the "Gazeta.Ru", that Maltsev prepared his statements independently.

Matvey Ganapolsky and Daria Mitina note that with his rhetoric and behavior, Maltsev resembles a politician from the LDPR party Vladimir Zhirinovsky, also known for his harsh ambiguous statements. Zhirinovsky himself, during the debate with Maltsev, claimed that Vyacheslav studied his, Zhirinovsky's, early speeches.

In his defense, Vyacheslav Maltsev claims that his opponents do not have any dirt on him. For the reason that during his work as a deputy of the Saratov Regional Duma, as well as deputy chairman of the Saratov Regional Duma, he did not steal and counteracted corruption.

== Personal life ==
Vyacheslav is married to Anna Maltseva, has sons Roman, Valery and daughters Varvara and Sofia. Vyacheslav's grandmother worked as a deputy chairman of the regional executive committee in the 1930s and 1940s.

In 2013, Valery Maltsev said that he would provide all possible support to the People's Alliance party in Saratov. In 2016, both Maltsev's sons were nominated in the PARNASSUS list: Roman Maltsev was the first number in the territorial group in the Saratov region, and Valery Maltsev was the second number in the Smolenskaya, Kaluga Region group. At the same time, Roman Maltsev was a candidate in the Balakovosky district of the Saratov region.
