= Medal "For the Return of Crimea" =

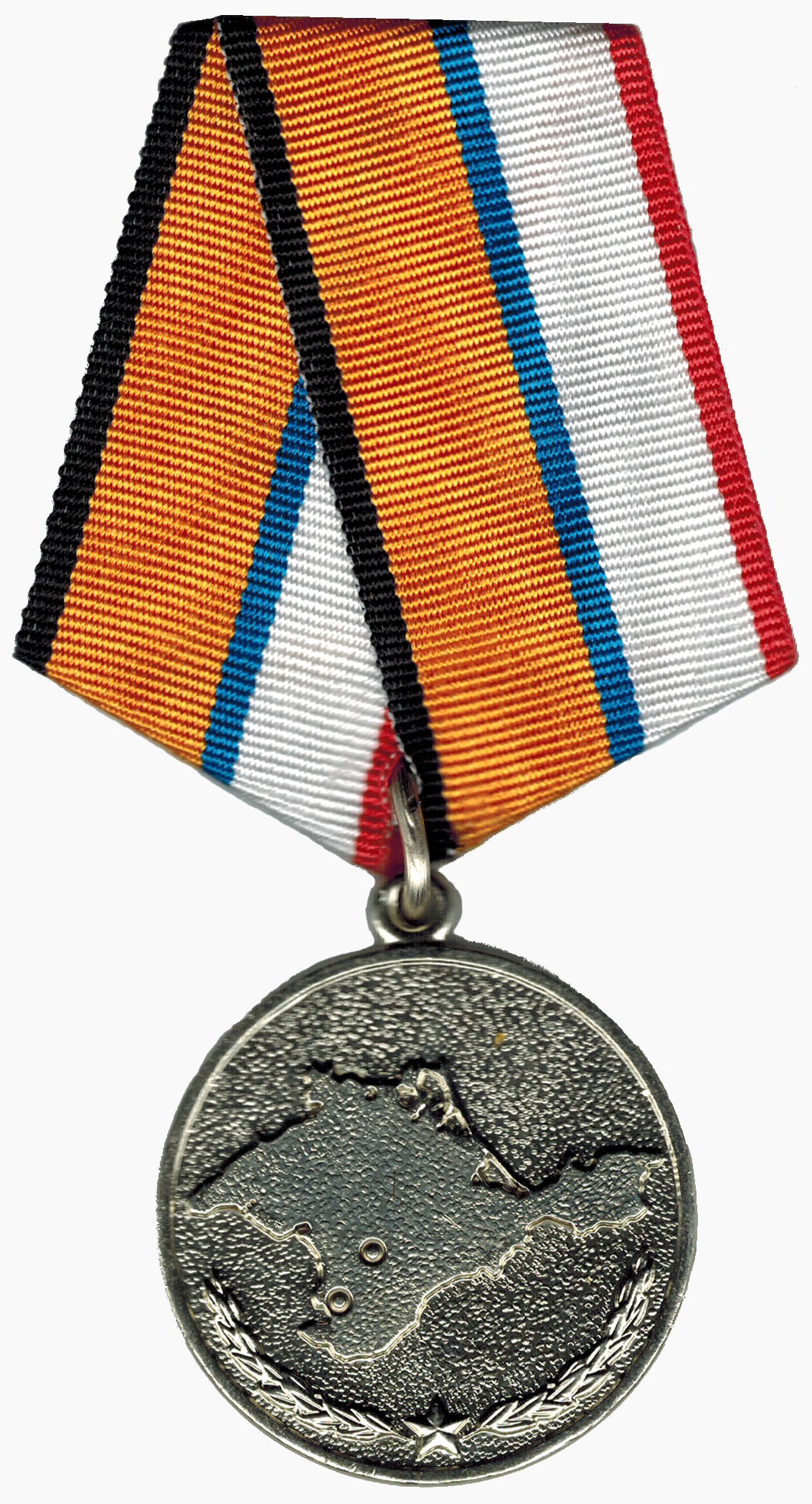
- Obverse of the medal
- Type: Campaign medal
- Awarded for: Service in Crimea during the 2014 Russian annexation
- Country: Russia
- Presented by: Ministry of Defence of the Russian Federation
- Campaign: Russo-Ukrainian War
- Established: 21 March 2014
- First award: 24 March 2014
- Ribbon of the medal

Precedence
- Next (higher): Medal "For Labour Valour"
- Next (lower): Medal "Mikhail Kalashnikov"

The Medal "For the Return of Crimea" (Russian: медаль «За возвращение Крыма», romanized: medal "Za vozvrashcheniye Kryma") is a campaign medal of the Ministry of Defence of the Russian Federation. The existence of the award was also confirmed by Yaroslav Roshchupkin, an employee of the press service for the Central Military District.

The medal was awarded to military and civilian personnel of the Russian Armed Forces for services and distinction displayed during the annexation of Crimea by the Russian Federation, the 2014 Crimean status referendum, and the entry of Crimea into the Russian Federation as the result of the referendum. The medal can also be awarded to other citizens of the Russian Federation and to foreign citizens for assistance in solving the tasks assigned to the Russian Armed Forces relating to these security measures taken in Crimea.

== Chronology ==
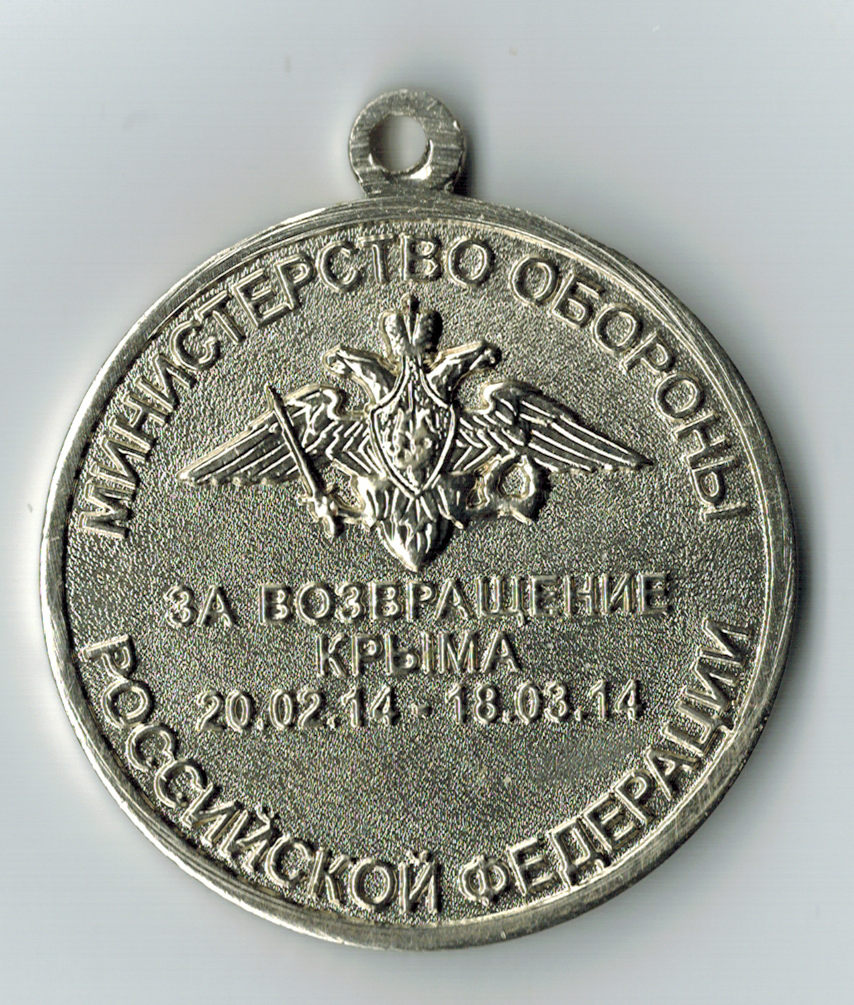
Reverse of the medal

Analysis of the Russian public tenders register "Kontur" performed by journalists in 2017 indicated that the tender for manufacturing the medal was announced on 17 December 2013, a few weeks after start of Euromaidan and months before the official start of "return of Crimea" as claimed by Russia. After this publication, all details of the order were hidden on the "Kontur" website.

On the reverse of the medal, the term of the "return of Crimea" campaign is indicated as "20.02.14 – 18.03.14". The start date of the "return of Crimea" operation appears 20 February when Viktor Yanukovych was still in office as Ukraine's head of state. In fact, only the next day President Yanukovych left Kyiv, and it was already 22 February 2014 when the Verkhovna Rada of Ukraine adopted the Resolution "On the dissociation of the President of Ukraine from fulfillment of constitutional powers and appointment of early presidential elections in Ukraine", used by Russia as a pretext for accusations of the alleged "unconstitutional coup in Ukraine". The fact that Crimea started its "return" to Russia two days before Yanukovych's removal from power and his resignation from the post of the President of Ukraine can be considered as an indirect proof that Russia launched its operation to seize the Crimean peninsula from Ukraine on 20 February 2014.

Inquired about the 20 February date, Sergey Lavrov replied in 2018 that it was a "technical mistake".

== Similar medals ==
A similar award, the Medal "For the Liberation of the Crimea" (Russian: медаль «За освобождение Крыма», romanized: medal "Za osvobozhdeniye Kryma"), was awarded to head of Chechnya Ramzan Kadyrov and Krasnodar Krai governor Alexander Tkachov, as well as the Night Wolves leader Alexander Zaldastanov for "support of Crimeans" in achieving "self-determination".

There is also the Medal "For the Defence of Crimea" (Russian: медаль «За защиту Крыма», romanized: medal "Za zashchitu Kryma") instituted by the Russian head of Crimea Sergey Aksyonov on 30 March 2015.

It was widely reported in the media when a "Crimea medal" was to be put on auction in Moscow on 13 April 2019 by Igor Girkin, a Russian militant commander involved in the war in Donbas. This medal, however, was not the one described above, but one made by a private initiative.
