= Monument to the 1st Cavalry Army =

- Russian: Монумент Первоконникам
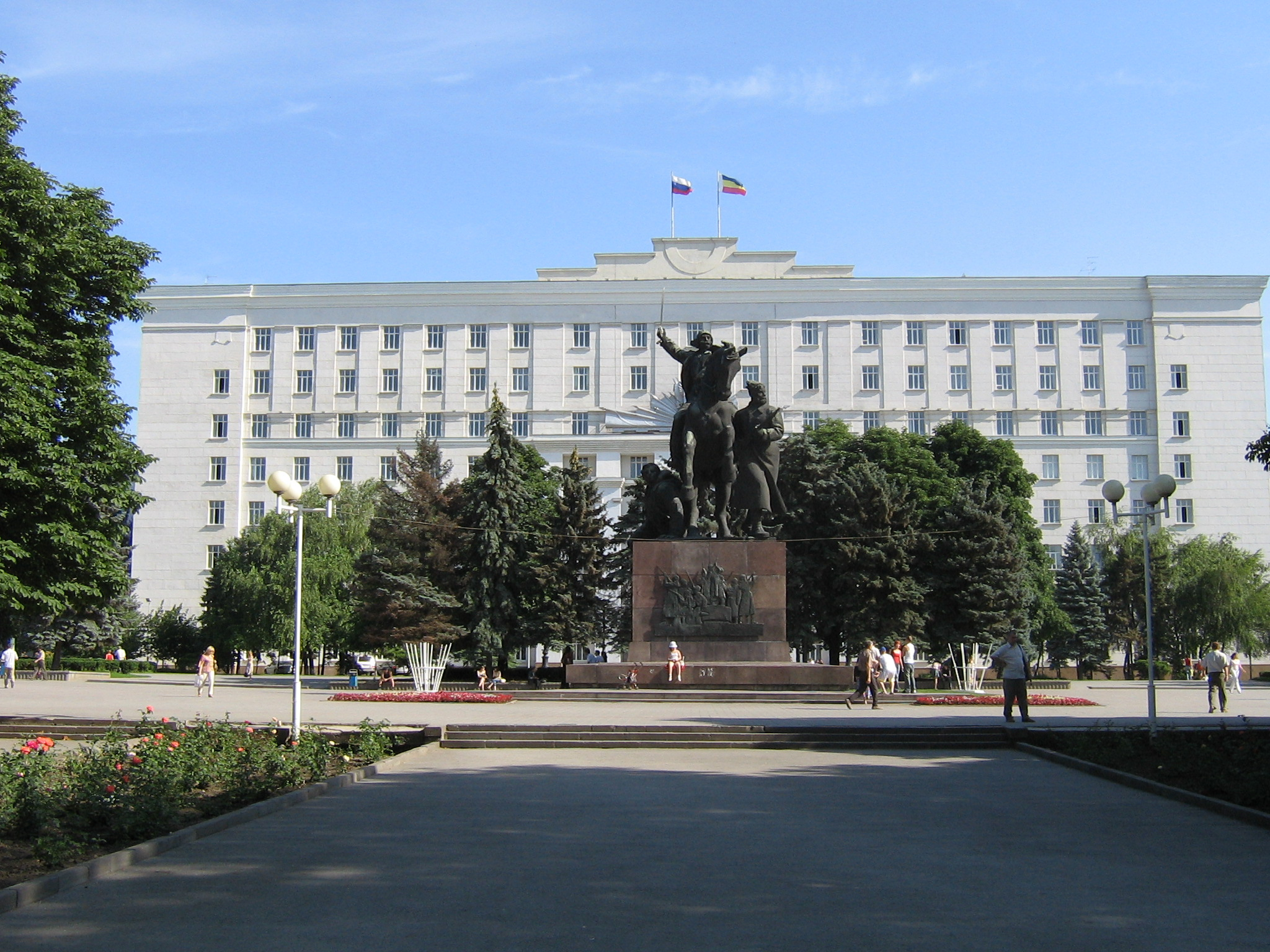
- The Monument to the 1st Cavalry Army in front of the House of Soviets
- Interactive map of Monument to the 1st Cavalry Army
- Location: Rostov-on-Don, Rostov Oblast, Russia
- Coordinates: 47°07′55″N 39°25′53″E
- Designer: Evgeniy Vuchetich
- Material: bronze
- Opening date: 1972

The Monument to the 1st Cavalry Army (Russian: Монумент Первоконникам) is a monument in Rostov-on-Don, Rostov Oblast, Russia. It was built in 1972 on the project of architect Evgeniy Vuchetich and is situated at the centre of the Soviets Square. It is dedicated to the soldiers of the Red Army who in 1920 defeated the White forces and took the city. The monument has the status of an object of cultural heritage of regional significance.

== Description ==
The sculptural assembly of the monument was designed by Evgeniy Vuchetich; the architectural part was designed according to the project of Iosif Lovijko, Jan Rebayn and Leonid Eberg. The monument was constructed in the monumental style, which was typical for Vuchetich's works. On the massive granite pedestal, the cavalryman gallops holding a saber. His horse stands on its hind legs and rushes forward. To his left is the figure of an attacking Red Army soldier. On his right is a wounded sailor who throws a grenade. On the pedestal of the monument there are plot compositions depicting the fights of the 1st Cavalry Army.

=== History ===
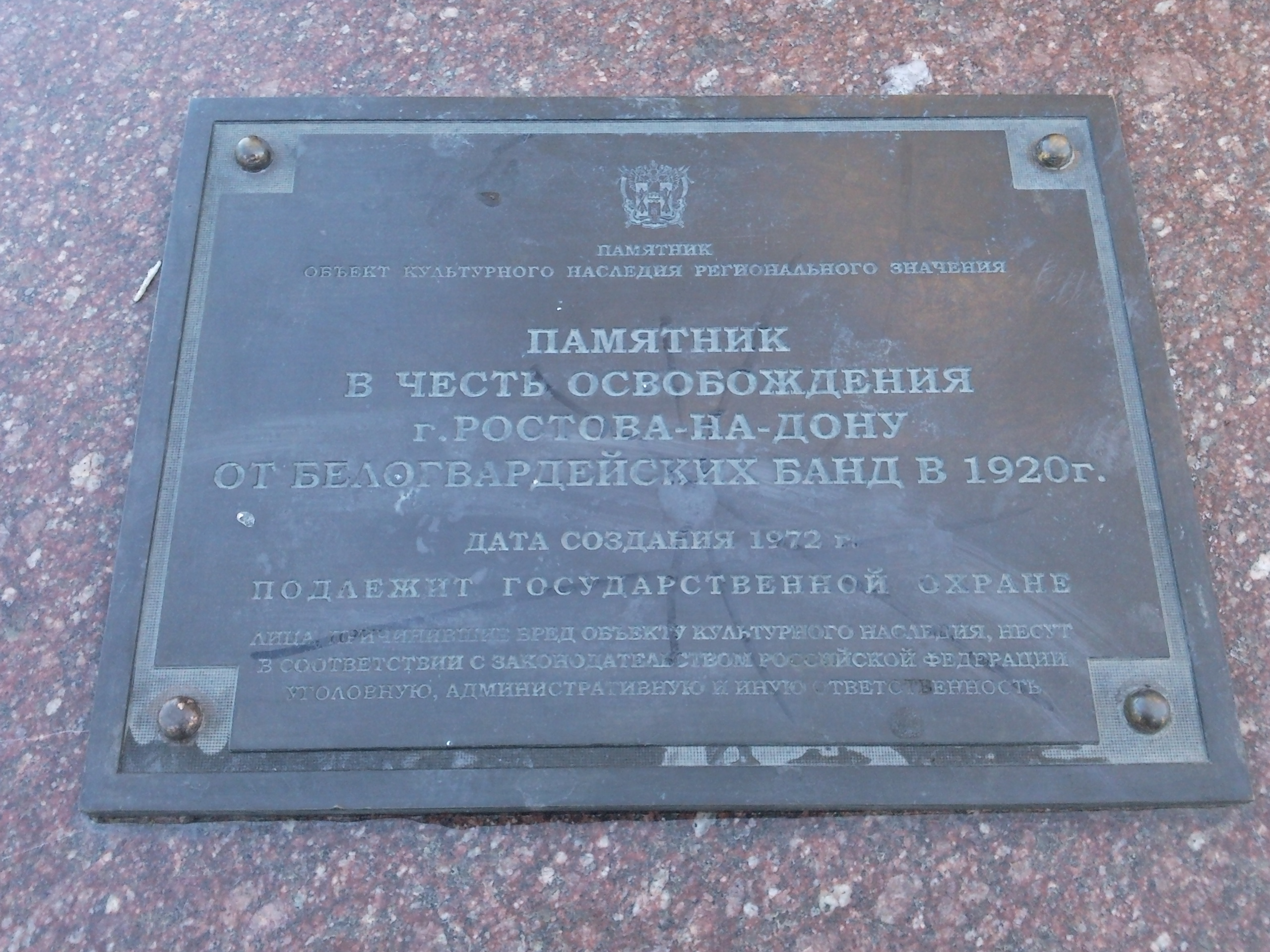
Memorial board at the monument: in honour of the liberation of Rostov-on-the-Don from whiteguard gangs in 1920

The monument, which made in Vuchetich's workshop, was originally intended to be delivered to Volgograd and to be dedicated to Bolshekiks' victory in the Battle of Tsaritsyn. But this plan was abandoned and so then the sculptor proposed to put it in Rostov-on-Don in memory of the liberation of the city from the White Guards in 1920. Monument to the 1st Cavalry Army, installed in front of the building of Party's Regional Executive Committee, was inaugurated on 30 April 1972.

After the dissolution of the Soviet Union, the monument began to be criticized for its low artistic level, and also because it stands on the site of the demolished Alexander Nevsky Cathedral. In 1996, at the request of the local Cossacks, a memorial board with the text "Constructed to commemorate the liberation of Rostov-on-the-Don from whiteguard gangs in 1920" was removed from the monument. Horse sculpture has unnaturally large testicles, so the monument also became an object of jokes and urban legends. Another reason for jokes is the sculpture of sailor who throws a grenade towards the office of the President's Representative in the Southern Federal District.
