= State Bank Building (Rostov-on-Don) =

- Здание Государственного Банка (Russian)
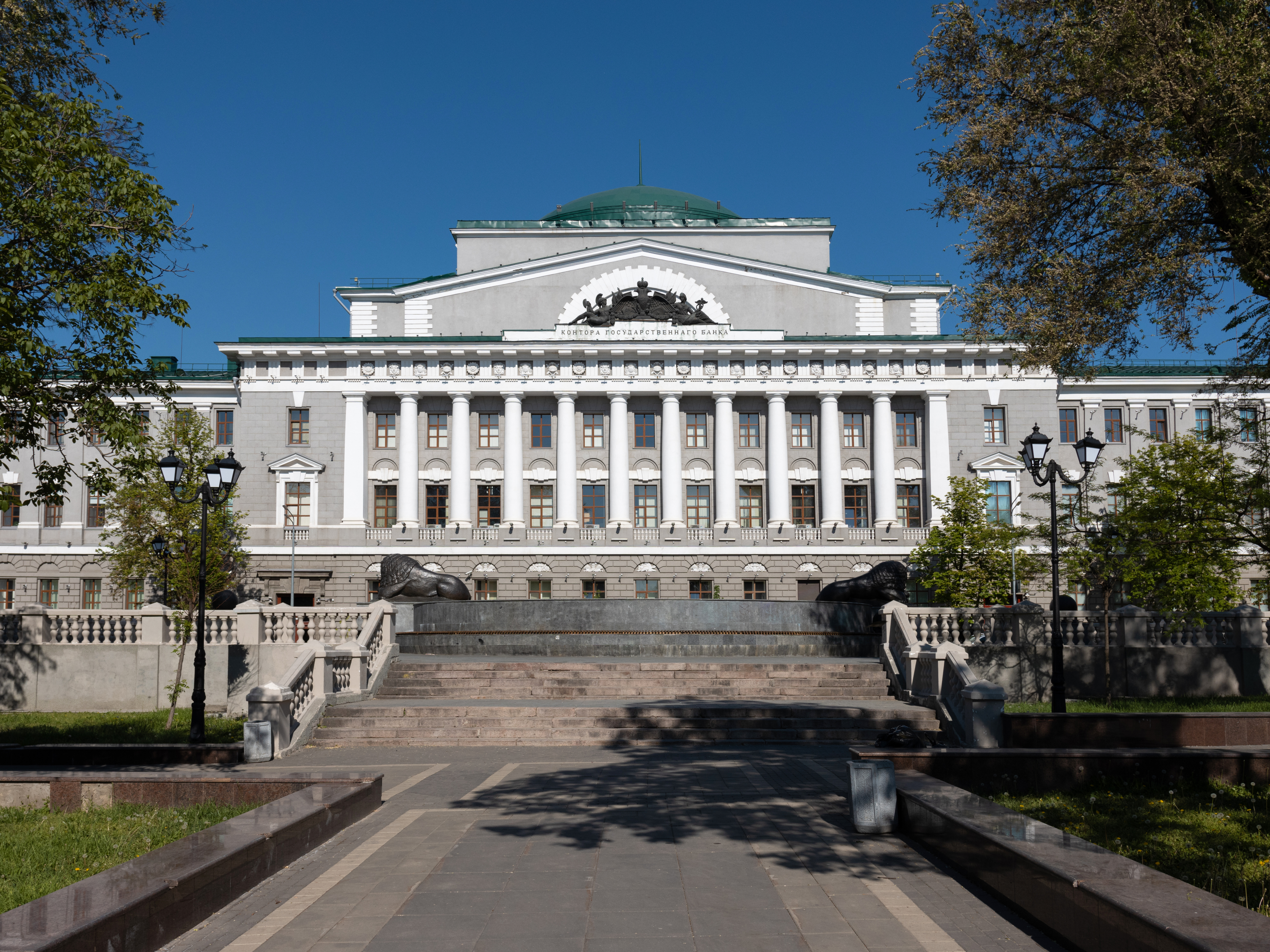
- State Bank Building

- Location within Rostov Oblast Location within Russia
- 47.222497°N 39.722019°E
- Type: Fortress and museum
- Location: Rostov-on-Don, Rostov oblast Russia

History
- Built: 1475

Site notes
- Architect: Marian Peretyatkovich

State Bank Building is a building in Rostov-on-Don, Russia. It was constructed in 1915 and designed by architect M. M. Peretyatkovich. Initially, the office of the State Bank of the Russian Empire was situated in the building. Nowadays it is home to the Rostov affiliate of the Central Bank of Russia. It has the status of an object of cultural heritage of regional significance.

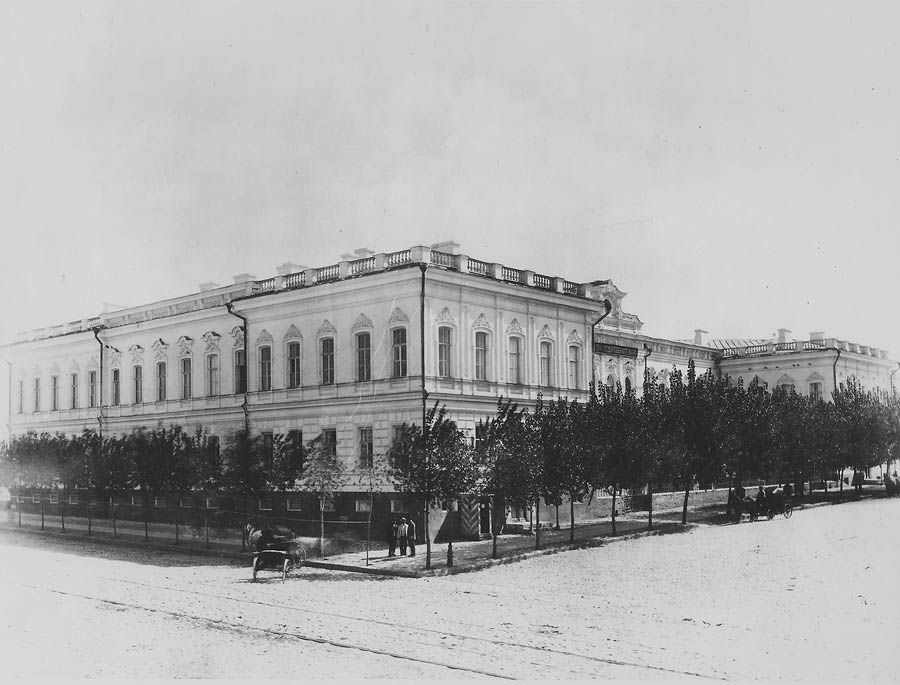
Old bank building

At the beginning of the 20th century, the office of the State Bank was located in a two-story building on the corner of Bolshaya Sadovaya Street and Sredny Prospekt (now Sokolova Avenue). There was not enough room for it, so they had to rent some additional premises. Then it was decided to build a new building instead of the old one.

The new building was designed by architect M. M. Peretyatkovich in 1910. Construction began on April 28, 1913. Construction of the State Bank's office was completed in 1915. The building of the State Bank front faced New Market Square (now Soviets Square) and was turned into the sanctuary of the Alexander Nevsky Cathedral (demolished in 1930).

After the establishment of the Soviet Union, the building was nationalized. In the 1920s, according to Peretyatkovich's plans, the south-eastern part was completed, where private apartments of employees were located. The building of the State Bank was the only building on the square to survive the Great Patriotic War. During the reconstruction of the square, the fronts of other buildings were designed in a similar neoclassical style.

In the 1950s, instead of a sculptural composition with a double-headed eagle, the coat of arms of the USSR was installed on the facade of the building . In 1994, the facade was reconstructed, during which the original heraldic composition was restored.
