= Soviets Square (Rostov-on-Don) =

Street in Rostov-on-Don, Russia

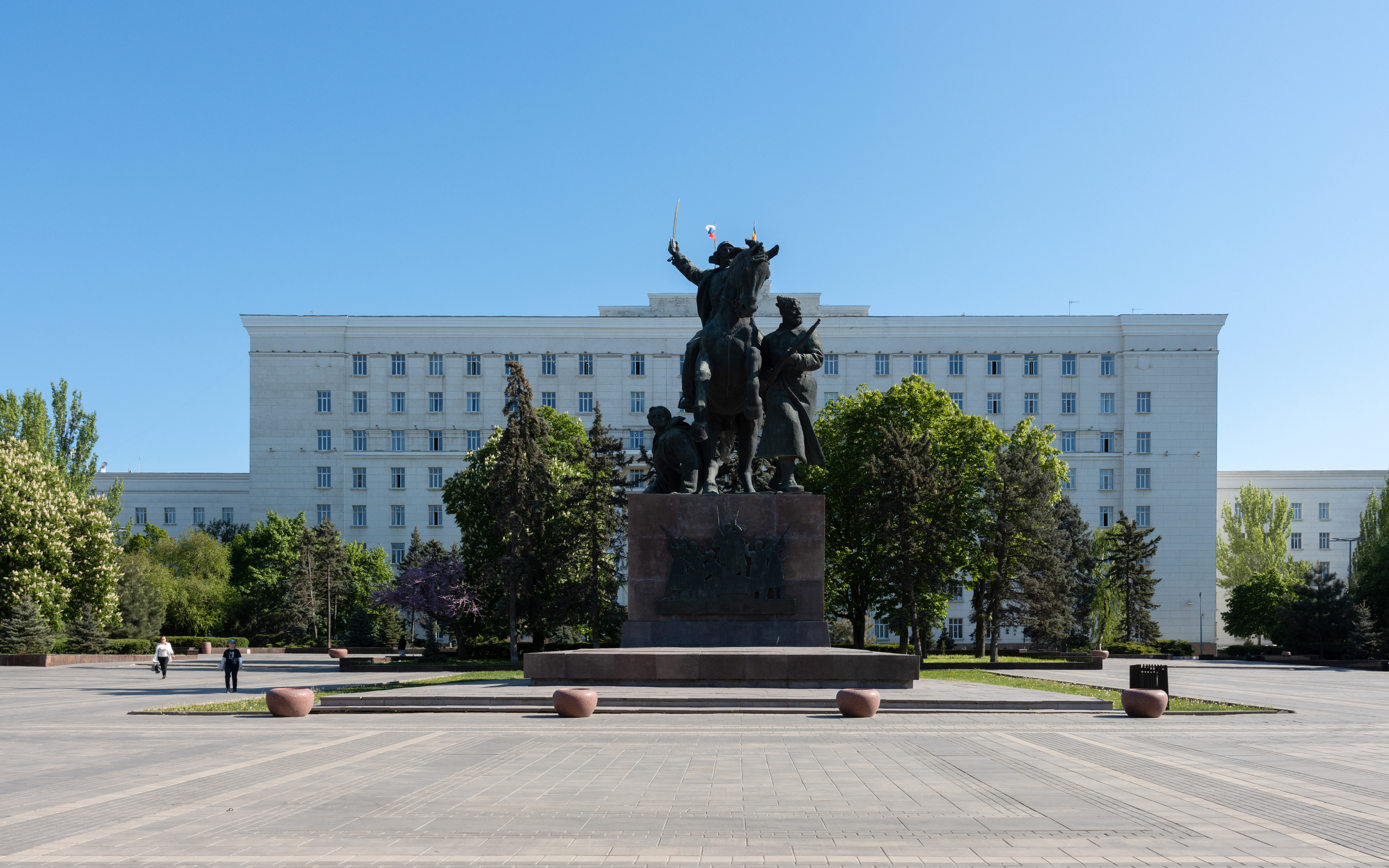
- The Monument to the 1st Cavalry Army and the House of Soviets behind it at Soviets Square
- Interactive map of Soviets Square
- Location: Rostov-on-Don, Russia
- Coordinates: 47.1319°N 39.4313°E

Soviets Square or Sovetov Square (Russian: Площадь Советов) is a city square of Rostov-on-Don, situated in Kirovskiy District at the intersection of Bolshaya Sadovaya Street, Voroshilovsky Avenue, Sokolova Avenue and Sotsialisticheskaya Street.

== History ==
The area which afterwards was called the New Bazaar, was first designated by a city plan of 1845; at that time there were "cold buildings" situated. After the end of the Crimean War, in Rostov-on-Don the construction of the square began. By 1860, its square was built with a perimeter of one-story houses. Along the Great and Middle Avenues there were trading rows.

In 1891-1908, in the center of the square was being built the Alexander Nevsky Cathedral, which became its architectural dominant and compositional center. By the beginning of the 20th century, brick commercial shops and other merchant houses appeared at the square and at the adjacent Bolshoy and Middle Avenues (now Voroshilovsky Avenue and Sokolova Street). In 1913-1915 the building of the State Bank was constructed at the square. In 1929-1930, the Alexander Nevsky Cathedral was demolished, so the building of the State Bank became the architectural dominant of the square. In 1929-1934, the building of the House of Soviets, built in the constructivist style, was constructed on the project of architect Ilya Golosov.

During the Great Patriotic War, most of the building at the square were destroyed. Only the building of the State Bank was preserved.

By the end of the 1950s, the area around Soviets Square had been built up again. Soon it became the main administrative area of the city. In 1972, in the center of the square, the Monument to the 1st Cavalry Army was erected on the project architect Evgeniy Vuchetich.

== Gallery ==
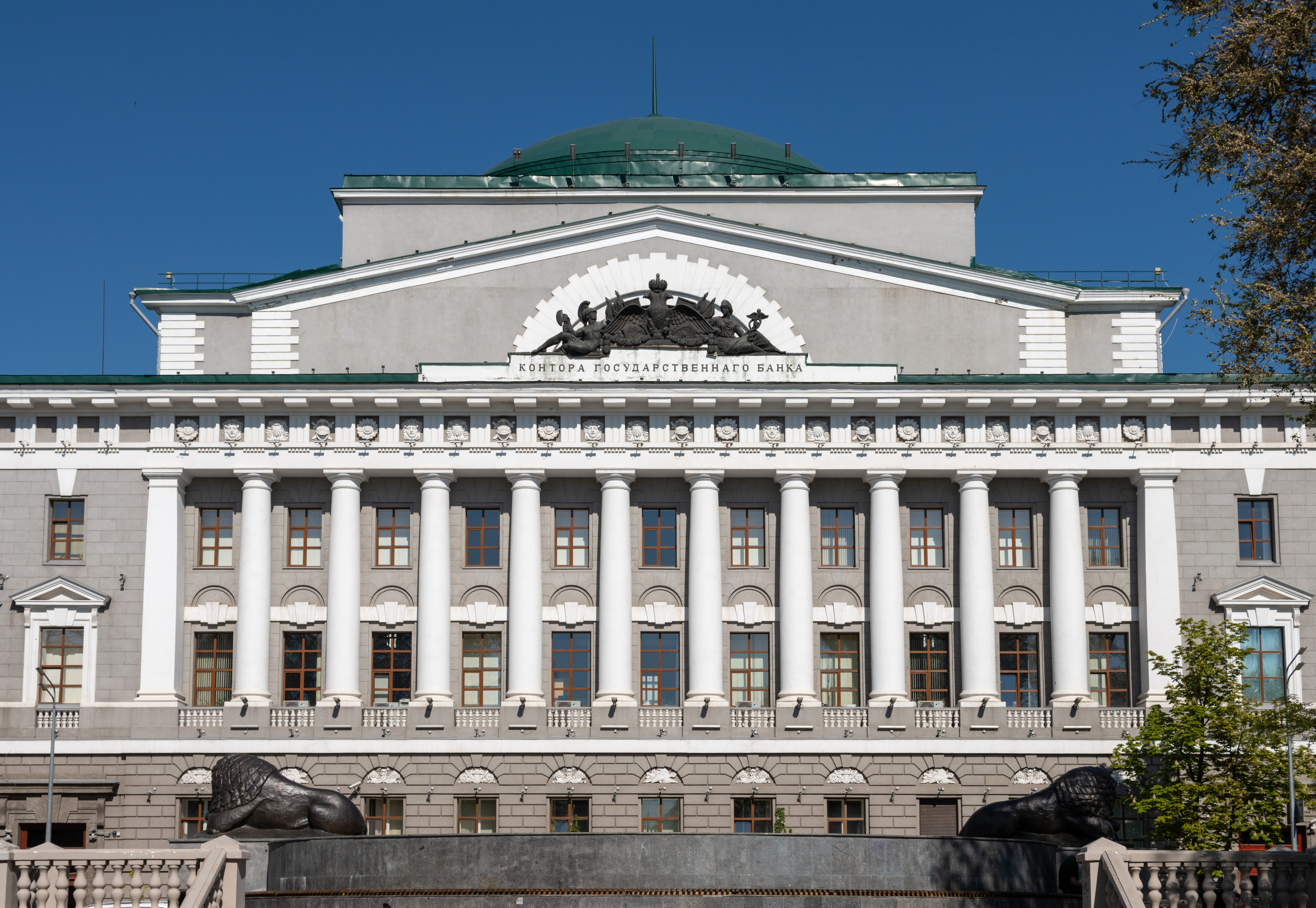
The building of the State Bank

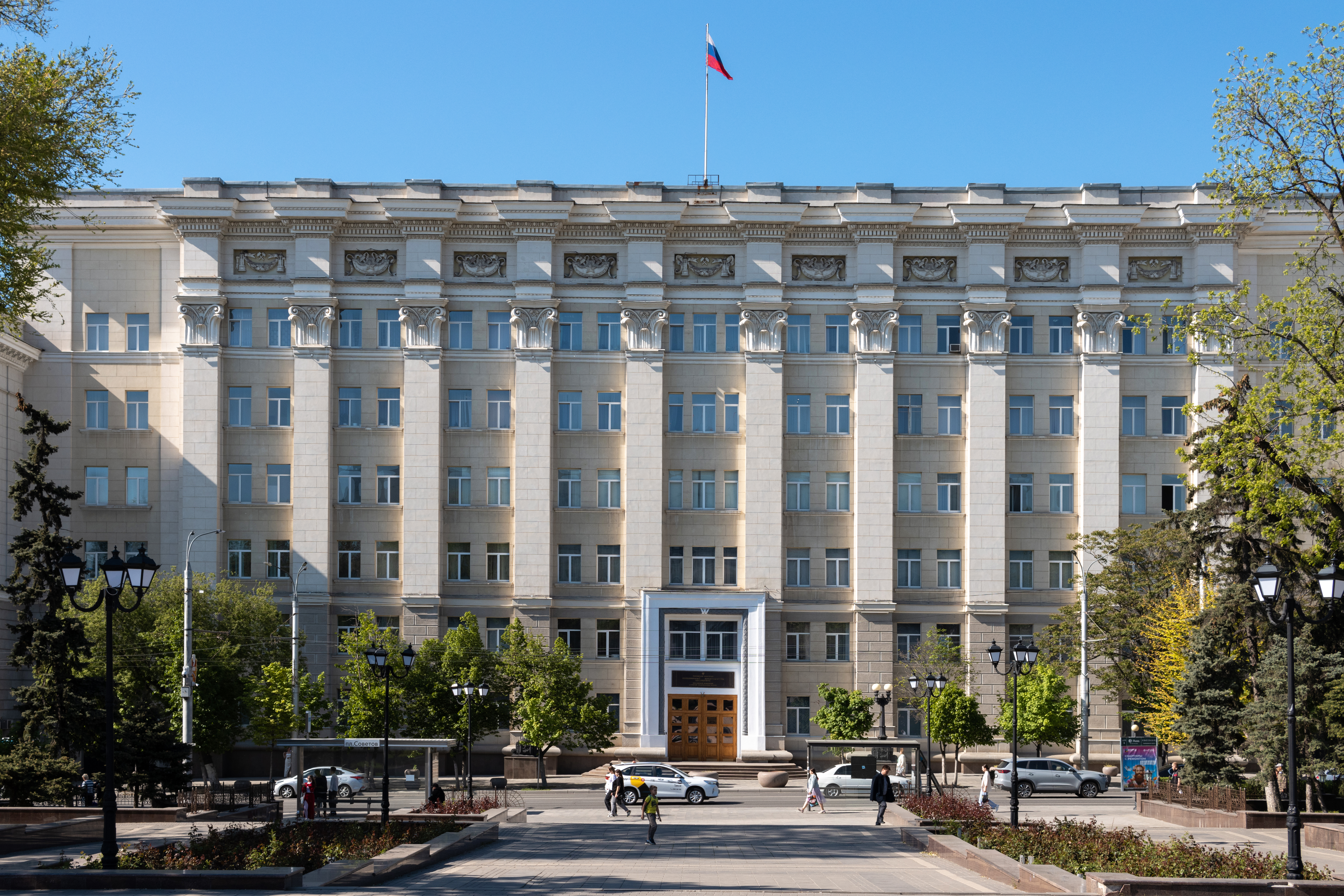
The Office of President's Representative in the Southern Federal District

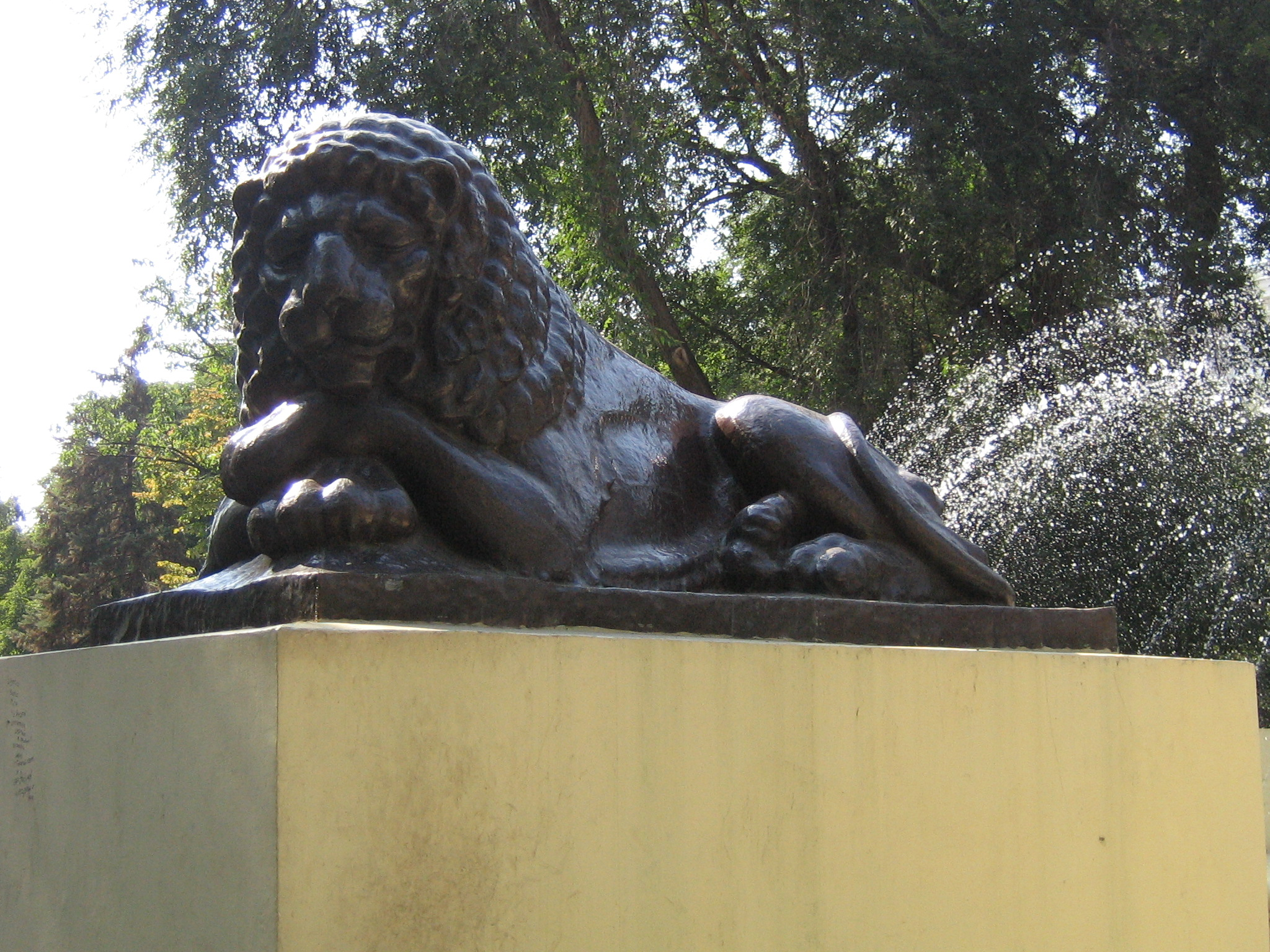
Lion sculpture
