= House of Soviets (Rostov-on-Don) =

- Дом Советов
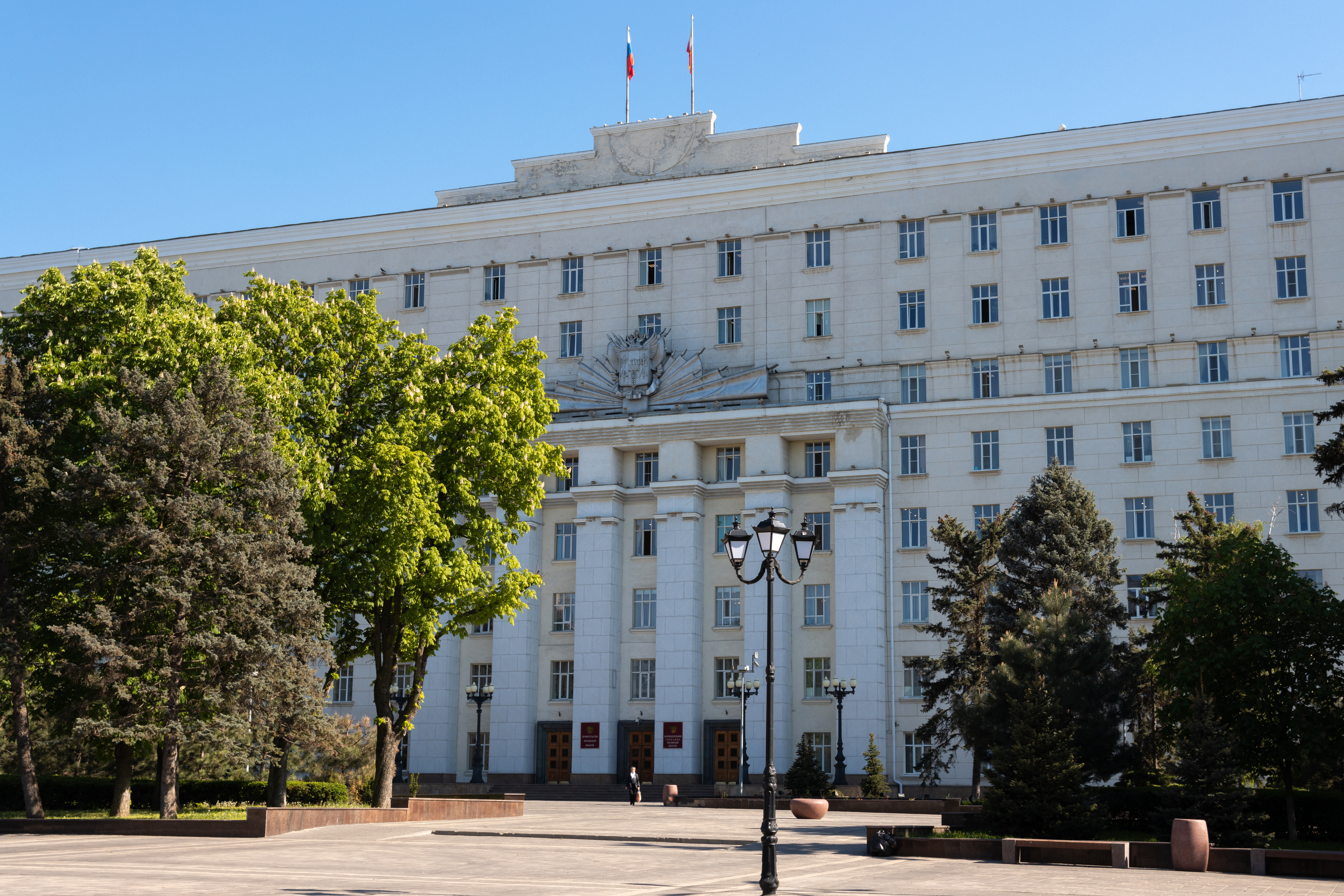
- Main façade of the House of Soviets behind Soviets Square
- Interactive map of the House of Soviets area

General information
- Type: Administrative building
- Architectural style: Stalinist architecture
- Location: Rostov-on-Don, Russia
- Coordinates: 47°13′16″N 39°43′15″E
- Construction started: 1935
- Completed: 1956

Design and construction
- Architect: Ilya Golosov
- Other designers: Vladimir Grigor, Vladimir Simonovich

The House of Soviets (Russian: Дом Советов, Dom Sovetov) is an administrative building in the centre of Rostov-on-Don built in Stalinist style in the late 1930s. By the beginning of the Great Patriotic War the House of Soviets had not yet been fully completed. Repair and restoration work were carried out only in the 1950s, and the facades of the building were completed only in 1968. The total volume of the Rostov House of Soviets is 370,000 cubic meters, which makes it one of the largest buildings in the North Caucasus and the largest administrative structure in Southern Russia.

== History and description ==
The House of Soviets is situated at the historic center of Rostov-on-Don, at Soviets Square. It was initially planned that the building would have 1000 rooms, a conference hall, canteens, a post office, a hairdresser, buffets, a printing house and other services. Its crown was to be a cylindrical building with a conference hall. However, this was still under construction at the time of the Axis invasion of the Soviet Union in 1941, and what had been built was damaged during the German occupation of the city in 1942. During the post-war reconstruction, the eight-storey building partially lost its originally planned appearance. The facades lost the tape glazing - it was simply bricked up, the wall field was embossed, a heavy portal was installed above the main entrance to the building on huge rectangular pilasters. The designers of the new facade were architects Vladimir Grigor and Vladimir Simonovich.

The design of the Rostov House of Soviets was drawn up between 1929 and 1934 by architect Ilya Golosov. The site chosen for the administrative building had previously been occupied by the Alexander Nevsky Cathedral, until its demolition in 1930. The foundation of the House of Soviets was laid in 1935. Construction works were carried out at slow rate, though the basic work had been completed by 1941. The finishing work had not been completed before the beginning of the Great Patriotic War, although parts of the building were already in use. In the post-war period, taking advantage of the city's lack of funds, the Ministry of Defence proposed that the House of Soviets be rebuilt and completed by German prisoners of war, under the condition of alienating 80% of the usable area. The city was forced to agree, and the building is now partly occupied by the so-called Watch factory. Only the final two wings of the House of Soviets, facing Bolshaya Sadovaya Street, and the central portion are occupied by the administration of Rostov Oblast.
