= Alexander Zaldastanov =

Russian motorcycle club leader, political activist, and former physician (born 1963)

- Александр Залдастанов
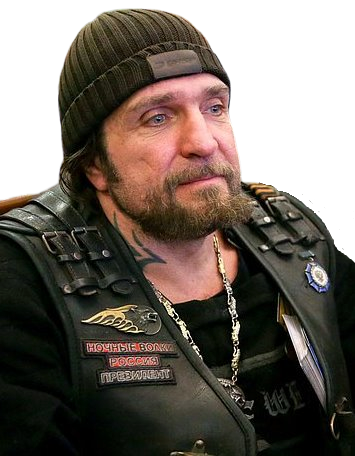
- Zaldastanov in 2019
- Born: 19 January 1963 (age 63); Kirovohrad, Ukrainian SSR, Soviet Union
- Occupations: President of Night Wolves, political activist, former physician
- Political party: United Russia

Alexander Sergeyevich Zaldastanov (Russian: Алекса́ндр Серге́евич Залдаста́нов; born 19 January 1963), also known as "Surgeon" (Russian: Хирург), is a Russian motorcycle club leader, political activist, and former physician. He is the leader of the Night Wolves, Russia's largest motorcycle club. He was awarded the Medal "For the Return of Crimea" by President of the Russian Federation Vladimir Putin for his actions in "Helping Crimeans to self-determine".

== Early life ==
Zaldastanov was born in Kirovohrad (present day Kropyvnytskyi in Ukraine, then USSR) in 1963. His father is a native of Kirovohrad, and his mother, a doctor, is a native of Moscow. Zaldastanov describes his mother as a "convinced communist", but he says that the family still prayed to Russian Orthodox icons. The Zaldastanovs spoke Russian at home.

The family moved to Sevastopol in the Crimea when he was young, and later to Moscow. Zaldastanov studied medicine in Moscow, and practiced as assistant of surgeries, specializing in post-traumatic facial reconstruction. He left medicine and became involved in motorcycle club activities.

In 1985 he was married to a German woman (now divorced) and frequently visited West Berlin. For a brief time he was working as a bouncer in a nightclub Sexton in West Berlin (now there is a club with this name in Moscow).

== Night Wolves ==
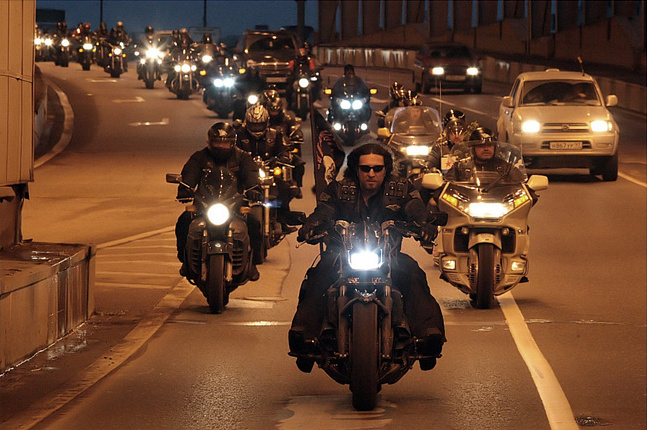
Riding with the Night Wolves, 2013

Zaldastanov was introduced to motorcycle culture in the mid 1980s, while he was in Berlin. He purchased a Czech-made motorcycle, and began participating in the biker scene in Moscow while still working as a surgeon. He formed the Night Wolves, Russia's first major motorcycle club, in 1989. The club maintains close ties to the Russian Orthodox Church, and promotes nationalist ideals. Moving away from themes like drugs and organized crime associated with American motorcycle clubs like the Hells Angels, Zaldastanov began to use the club for political activism in the 2000s.

In the late 2000s, the club began holding rallies in the former Soviet Eastern European countries, promoting Slavic culture. Vladimir Putin participated in one rally, travelling with the group to Sevastopol in 2012. Zaldastanov has offered the Night Wolves to the Russian Government as an informal militia. Zaldastanov and other club members visited Crimea just prior to the Russian annexation in 2014, and publicly supported the change of power on the peninsula. He and the Night Wolves have offered support to pro-Russia militias fighting in the eastern Ukraine.

== Political activities ==
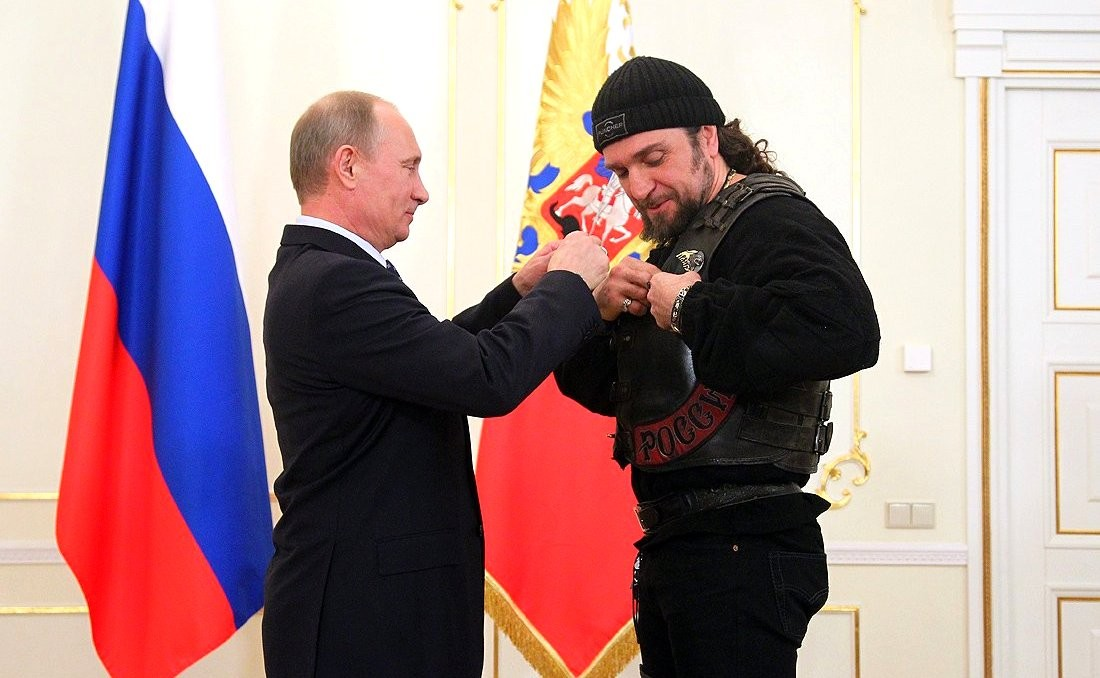
Zaldastanov and Putin, 2013

Zaldastanov is known for strong support of the Russian government, military, and President Vladimir Putin. He is also known for his admiration for former Soviet leader Joseph Stalin and homophobic views. Zaldastanov was one of the official torchbearers for the 2014 Winter Olympics in Sochi, and received the Order of Honour, a Russian state decoration, from Putin in 2013.

In January 2015, Zaldastanov formed the "Anti-Maidan" movement with journalist Nikolai Starikov and several right-wing politicians. The group opposes "Maidan"-style democratic revolutions, specifically the Orange Revolution and 2014 Euromaidan revolts in Ukraine, as well as opposition political groups within Russia. Zaldastanov suggested that "Death to faggots" could be an alternate name for the Russian anti-Maidan movement.

== Sanctions ==
Zaldastanov has been sanctioned by several governments, including the United States and Canada, for the Night Wolves' involvement in the unrest in Ukraine in the mid-2010s. The American government has accused him of personally taking part in the annexation of the Crimean peninsula by Russia in March 2014, by participating in “the confiscation of Ukrainian weapons with the Russian forces”. In April 2015, he and the Night Wolves were refused entry to the European Union at the Polish border.

In July 2022, Zaldastanov was sanctioned along with other Night Wolves leaders by the EU for the group’s propaganda efforts in support of Russia’s invasion of Ukraine that began earlier the same year. He and his organization have organized various rallies, concerts and fundraisers in support of the Russian troops and affiliated separatist groups.
