= Mark Galperin =

Russian activist (born 1968)

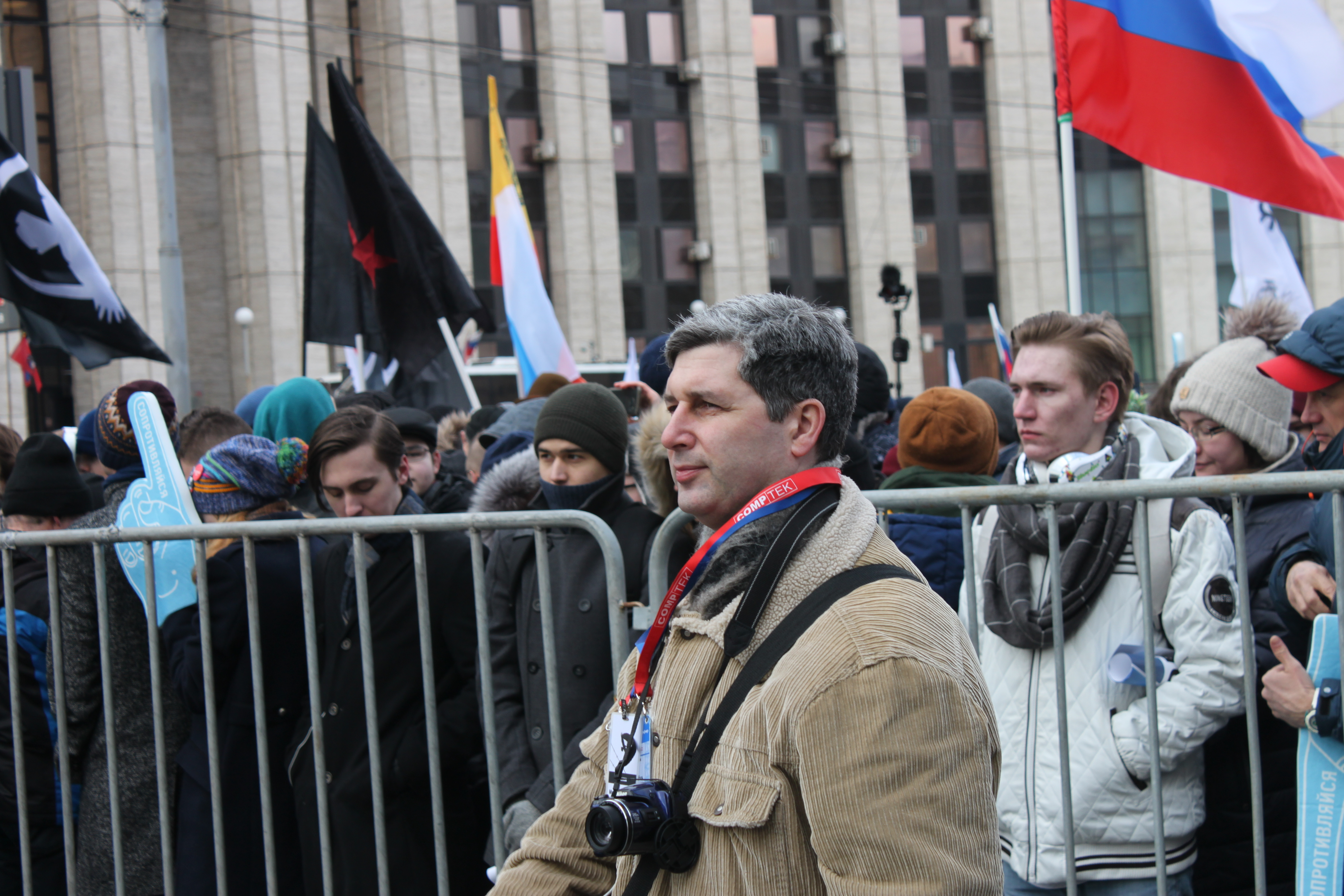
Mark Galperin during Rally against the isolation of Runet (2019-03-10).

Mark Izrailevich Galperin (Russian: Марк Израилевич Гальперин; born 20 April 1968) is a Russian political activist. He is one of the leaders of a coalition of democrats and part of nationalists known as the New opposition. Their goal is a change of the political regime in Russia.

On 7 February 2017 he was detained in Moscow and he is facing charges of incitement to extremist activity.

== Political activities ==
Every Sunday, Galperin organizes so called walks of the New opposition in Moscow and a number of other Russian cities. The aim of his activities is the change of the Russian regime through revolution or uprising. He believes it is no longer possible to change it through democratic elections due to frauds.

In January 2015, Galperin was sentenced to 38 days in jail for taking part in the street protests. During the first protest, which took place on 10 January 2015 after Charlie Hebdo shooting, he was holding up a Je Suis Charlie sign near the Kremlin walls, expressing solidarity with French cartoonists murdered by Islamist terrorists in Paris. A week later, he was detained during a rally in support of opposition leader Alexei Navalny.
