= Odesa massacre =

Odessa massacre may refer to

- Odessa pogroms
- 1941 Odessa massacre
- 2014 Odesa clashes
