= SKA Stadium =

SKA Stadium, a name of several stadiums in Ukraine

- SKA Stadium, a stadium in Lviv
- SKA Stadium, a stadium in Odesa
- SKA Stadium, a former name of CSK ZSU Stadium in Kyiv
