= Odessa Brigade (disambiguation) =

Odessa Brigade may refer to any of the following:

- Odessa Brigade, a pro-Russian separatist militant group operating in Ukraine during the war in Donbas.
- 160th Anti-Aircraft Missile Brigade (Ukraine), also known as "Odesa", a Ukrainian Air-Defense unit
- 122nd Odesa Defense Brigade, a Ukrainian Territorial Defense Brigade for Odessa Oblast
- 126th Odesa City Defense Brigade, the Territorial Defense Brigade for the City of Odessa
- Odessa Volunteer Brigade, a Russian volunteer militia operating during the full-scale Russian invasion of Ukraine
