= Army Sports Club Stadium =

Army Sports Club Stadium may refer to:

- Army Sports Club Stadium (Lviv), Ukraine
- Army Sports Club Stadium (Odesa), Ukraine
- Armijas sporta kluba stadions (later Latvijas Universitātes stadions), Riga, Latvia
