= Mayurov House =

Building in Odesa, Ukraine

Mayurov house
- Будинок Маюрова
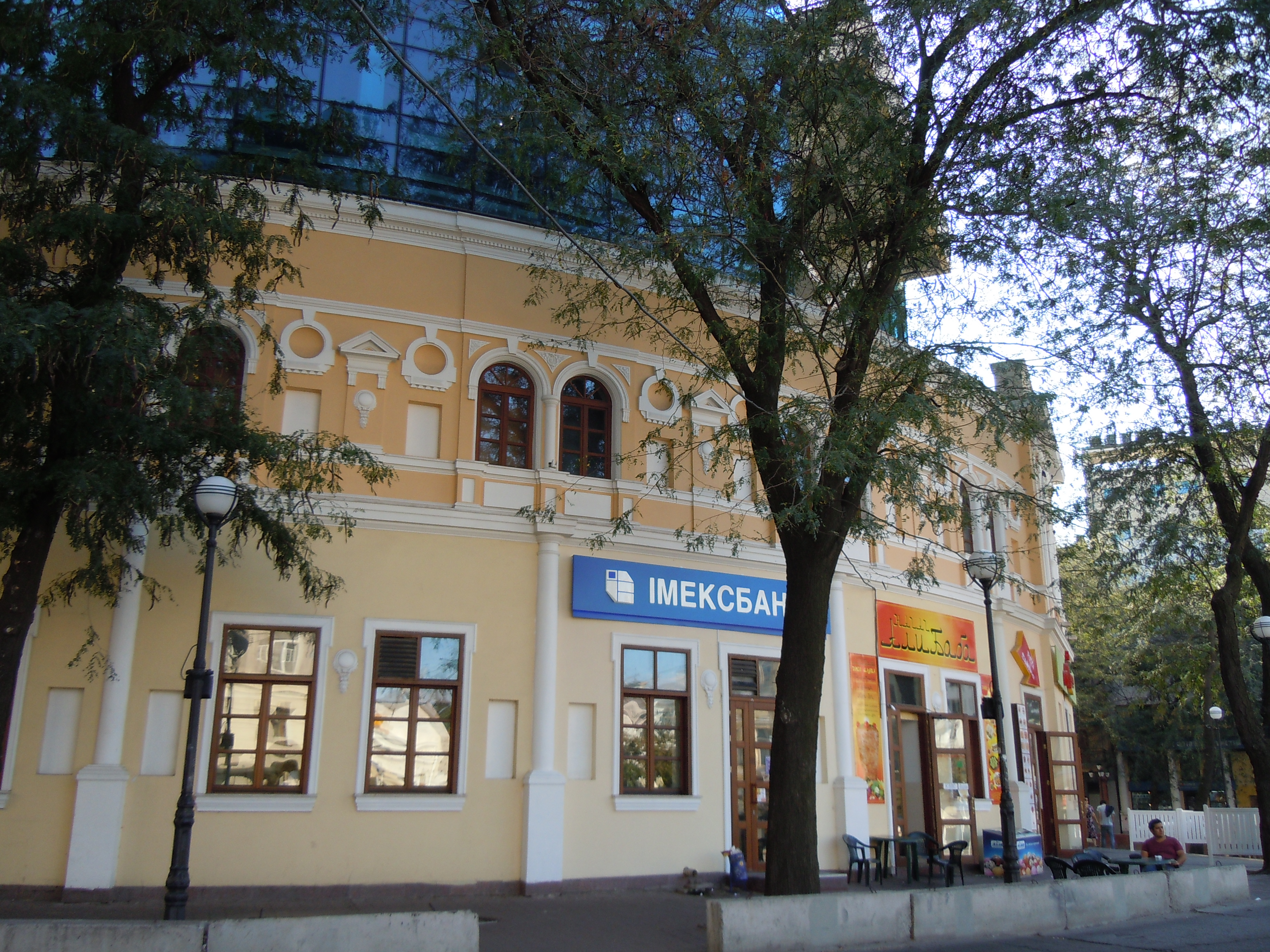
- Modern view of the building
- Interactive map of the Mayurov house area
- Alternative names: Roundhouse, Athena Gallery

General information
- Location: Hretska Ploshcha, 3/4, Odesa, Ukraine
- Coordinates: 46°28′58″N 30°44′08″E
- Opening: 1840s
- Renovated: 1996
- Destroyed: 1996
- Client: Aleksey Myurov

Design and construction
- Architect: Ivan Dallakva

Mayurov House, also known as the Roundhouse, is a famous building in Odesa, Ukraine. It is located in the city center on the Hretska Ploshcha (Greek Square), dividing it into two parts: a round part (with a well in past) and the Greek Market.

== History ==
The building was built by Russian colonel Aleksey Mayurov, who was a special officer of the Governor-General of Novorossiya Governorate. The permission for the building was given by Prince Vorontsov on January 4, 1841. The house was built in the 1840s by architect Ivan Dallakva. In 1894 the building was reconstructed by the architect I.F. Yatsenko.

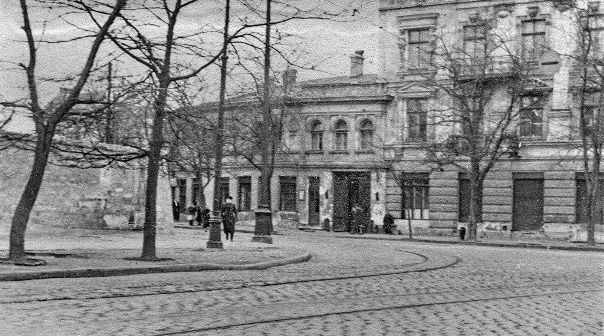
the view of the Hretska Ploshcha before the Round House was destructed

In the 1920s, the house manager was former convict Sergei Martynovsky, who was the founder and the manager of the Museum of Communist Party History. The Greek Square was named in his honor for a long time (called Martynovskogo Square). In 1996 the house was demolished and rebuilt with significant changes. The 7-floor structure was built inside the yard, but only the façade was saved. Currently, the modern shopping center Athena (also known as Athena Gallery) is located in the newly constructed building.

== The role of the building during 2 May 2014 clashes ==
During the 2 May 2014 Odesa clashes the parts of the Hretska Ploshcha and Hretska Street located beside the Mayurov House were the centre of street riots. A big group of pro-Russian militants were blocked in the Mayurov House. Then, a person with a St. George ribbon fired a gun from the roof of the building on the pro-Ukrainian activists, who occupied the Greek Square at that time.

== Sources ==
- Губарь О. Старые дома и другие памятные места Одессы. — Одесса, 2006.
- Сегал М. Одесса моей молодости // Одесский вестник. 1993. дек.
- Про Греческую площадь и не только
