= Hretska Ploshcha =

Square in Odesa, Ukraine

Hretska Square
- Greek Square
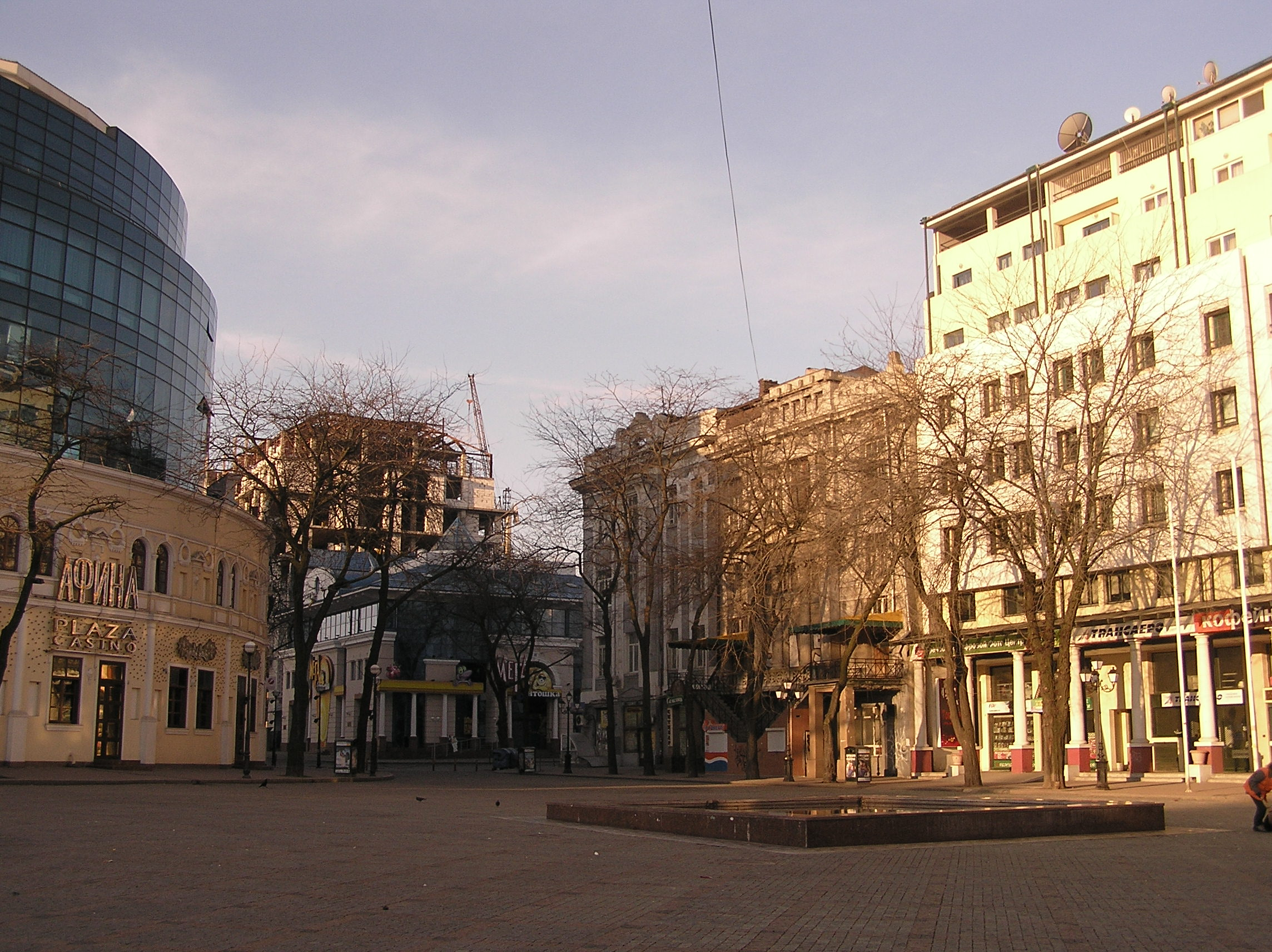
- Interactive map of Hretska Square
- Native name: Грецька площа (Ukrainian)
- Former names: Martynovskogo Square, Aleksandrovskaya Square
- Namesake: Greeks
- Coordinates: 46°29′0″N 30°44′08″E

Hretska Square, or Hretska Ploshcha (Ukrainian: Грецька Площа, lit. 'Greek Square') is one of the main squares of Odesa. It is on the crossing of Hretska Street and Ukrainskykh Heroiv Avenue. At different times it has been called Aleksandrovskaya (Russian: Александровская площадь) or Martynovskogo (Russian: Площадь Мартыновского). This is one of the biggest squares of Odesa. It is rectangular, with the oval building of Mayurov House in the center, also with semi-round houses on the sides.

This is the oldest square in Odesa. It survived from the market square of the town of Khadzhibey. Down by Hretska Street, between Hretska Ploshcha and Yevropeiska Street, was a Muslim cemetery. After the capture of the Khadzhibey Fortress the square was free of buildings. The building construction started from the part close to Hretska Street, later from Derybasivska Street. The buildings were built mainly by Greeks in Ukraine of the families Ioannopulos, Serafinos, Papakhadzhis, Rallis, and Maraslis. The Greek secret society Filiki Eteria (Greek: Φιλική Εταιρεία is the Society of Friends) (whose aim was the struggle for independence of Greece) was in one of the buildings on the square since 1814.

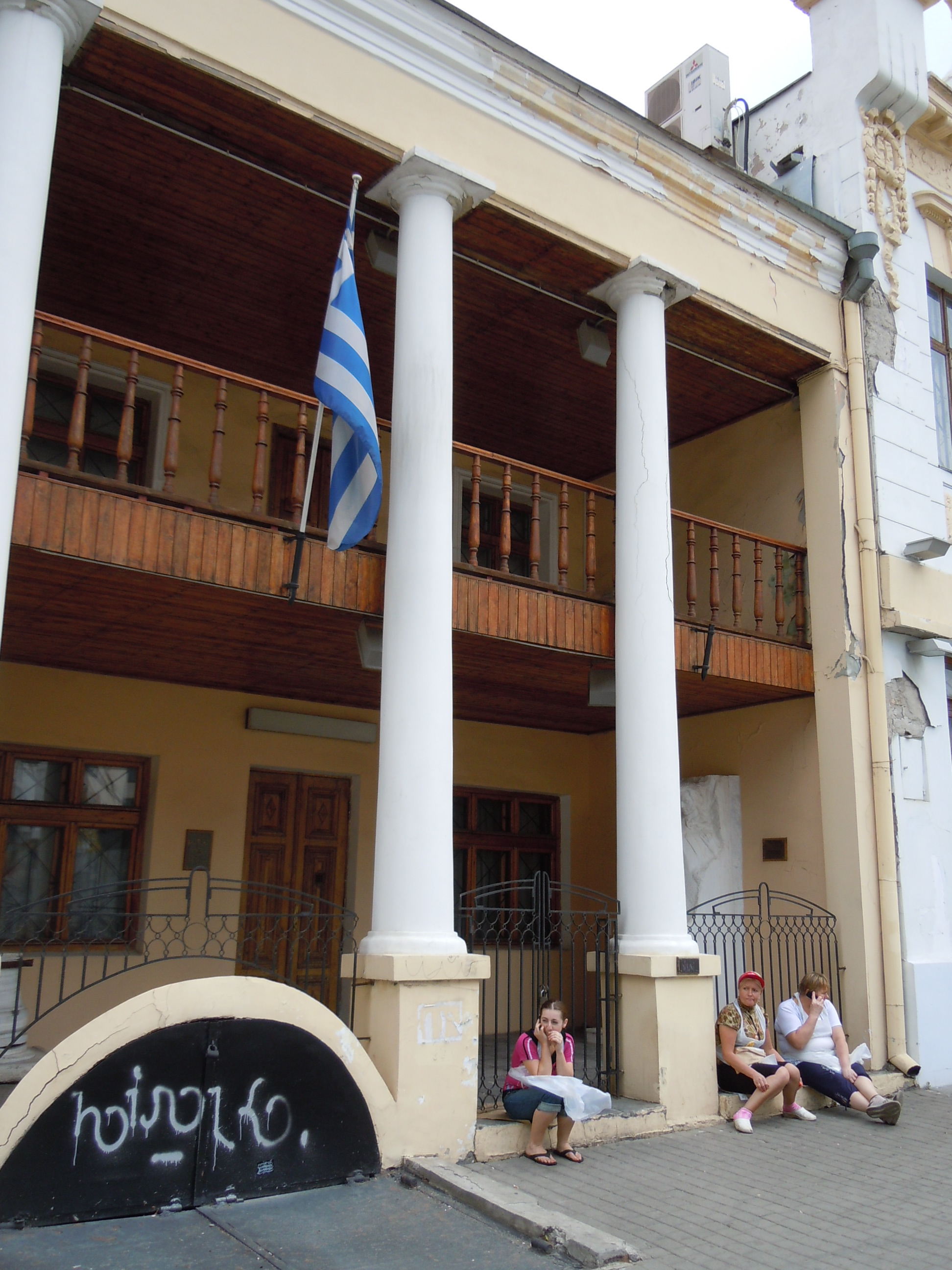
House of Filiki Eteria

The main market of the city was in the square for a long time. The garden square was in the centre of the square until the Greek Orthodox church was built. But the church building was not finished, and its foundations were re-used for building Mayurov House, also known as the Roundhouse. The last construction was a mall.

In the Soviet period the square was an important transport centre. Here was the tram station (later the trolleybus station), also the bus terminal. The semi-round house which separated the square from the Bunina Street, was demolished during World War II. The place was used as a garden in the 1950s and 1960s, but later the modern restaurant building was constructed. Mayurov House was demolished in 1996 and then rebuilt with significant changes.

== Links ==
- Греческая площадь (Александровская, Мартыновского)
- Про Греческую площадь и не только
- Греческая площадь
- Греческая площадь
- Из воспоминаний об Одессе
