= Kulykove Pole =

Garden square in Odesa, Ukraine

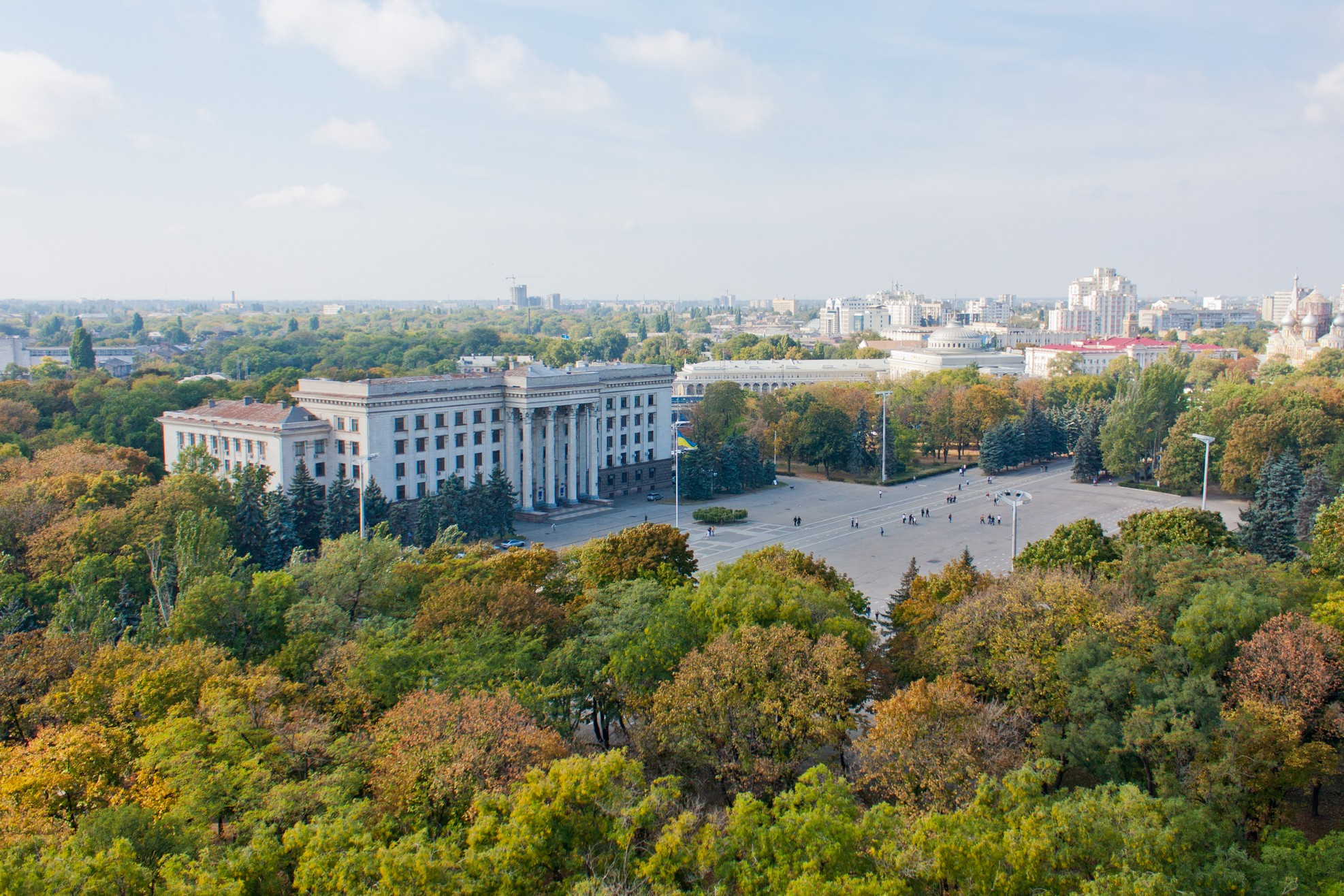
- View of Kulykove Field in September of 2013
- Native name: Куликове поле (Ukrainian)
- Former name: Ploshchad Oktyabrskoi Revolutsii ('October Revolution Square')
- Namesake: family of Kulikowski
- Coordinates: 46.466111°N 30.743889°E

Kulykove Pole (Ukrainian: Куликове поле, lit. 'Wader Field') is a garden square and necropolis located in the Prymorskyi raion of Odesa, in a historical centre of the city. It is located near Odesa railway station.

Over the years the square has been known for various festivities. In times of the Russian Empire, it was the site of Easter, Christmas and military parades, the 1909 celebration of the 200th anniversary of the Muscovy victory in the Battle of Poltava, the 100th Anniversary of the end of the French invasion of Russia, and other events. During the Soviet times, it was the site of military parades and 1 May demonstrations. In Ukraine, Kulykove Pole is known as a place of the annual Humorina celebration on April Fools' Day.

The etymology of the place's name is uncertain and still under discussion. One hypothesis links the name to a family called Kulikowski who had their estate on the site. Another suggests it was named after the Battle of Kulikovo.

== Trade Unions House fire ==
Kulykove Pole became famous during the Euromaidan events, serving as a place for anti-Maidan protesters, who built a tent city there in the beginning of 2014. This stood until the 2 May events, during which 42 people died whilst trapped in the burning Trade Unions House; 32 from carbon monoxide poisoning, and 10 after leaping from windows to escape the flames.
