= Odessa Brigade =

Russian separatist paramilitary group in southern and eastern Ukraine

- Отдельная бригада особого назначения «Одесса»
- Insignia of the Odessa Brigade
- Leaders: Anton Rayevsky (2014); Alexei "Foma" Fominov (2014–2015)
- Dates active: c. March/May 2014 – January 2015
- Country: Ukraine
- Allegiance: Luhansk People's Republic
- Part of: Russian people's militias in Ukraine

The Odessa Brigade, or officially the Separate Brigade of Special Purpose "Odessa" or OBrON "Odessa", was a pro-Russian militia in the war in Donbas. It originated as a militant anti-Maidan group which emerged in the Ukrainian city of Odesa in 2014. It emerged within the pro-Russian "Odesskaya Druzhina" movement which was involved in the 2014 Odesa clashes. Following this event, members of "Odesskaya Druzhina" (and others from Odesa and Russia) reorganized themselves into a separatist militia in the Donbas, fighting on behalf of the Luhansk People's Republic in the war in Donbas. The unit was disbanded in January 2015, probably as a result of inter-separatist power struggles.

== History ==
=== Origins in the 2014 Odesa clashes ===
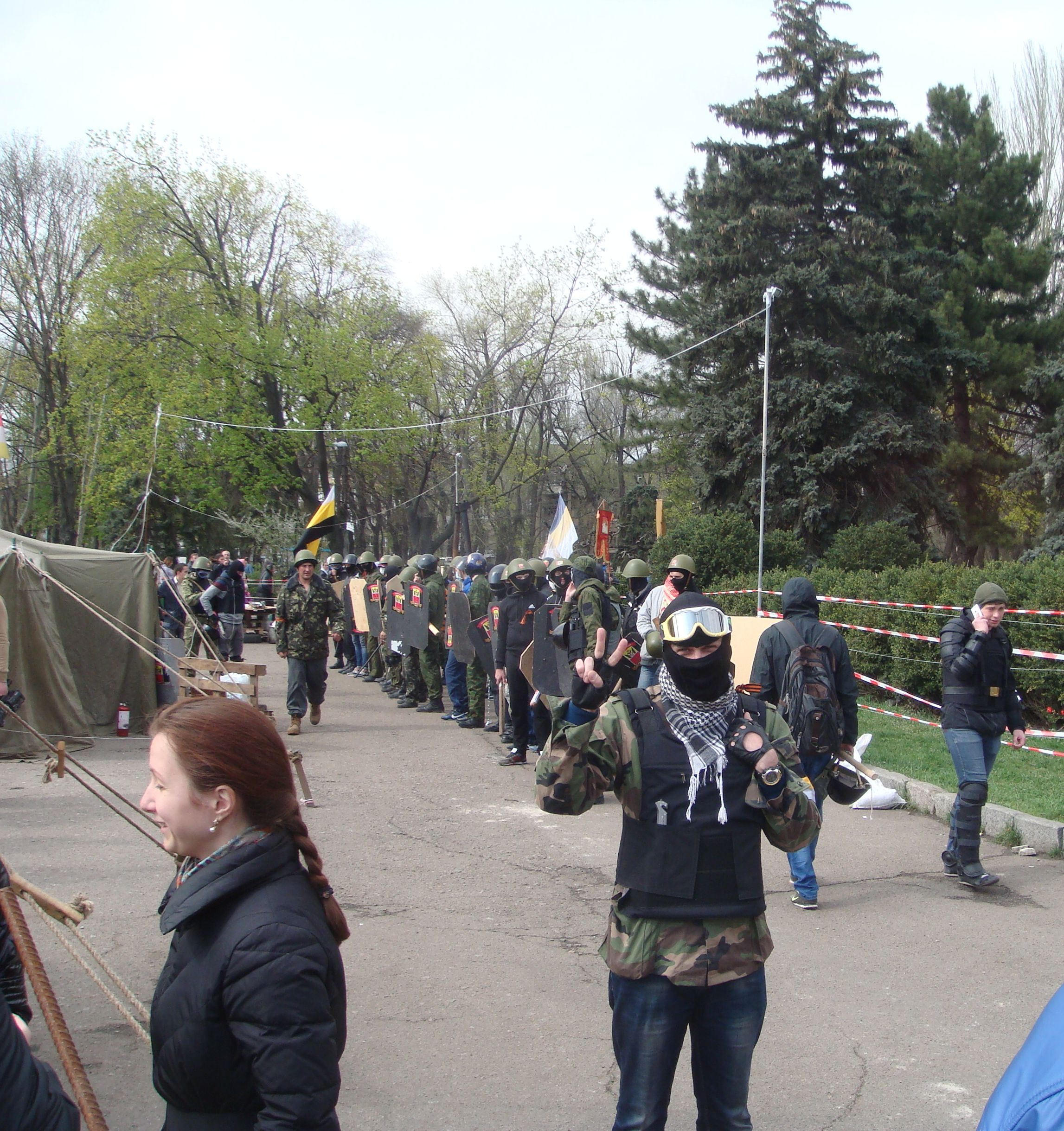
Militants at the pro-Russian camp, referred to as "Odesskaya Druzhina", during the 2014 Odesa clashes. The Odessa Brigade originated from one of these militant factions.

The important port city of Odesa (also spelled "Odessa") in Ukraine was one of the locations where pro-Euromaidan and anti-Maidan groups clashed during the Revolution of Dignity of 2014 and the following period of pro-Russian unrest. Radical pro-Russian demonstrators in Odesa mobilized into a militant movement, referred to as "Odesskaya Druzhina". There were other militant groups besides "Odesskaya Druzhina" such as the similarly named "People's Druzhina of Odessa". The militants generally shared extremist right- or left-wing viewpoints, with "Odesskaya Druzhina" being identified by openDemocracy as being antisemitic.

Anton Rayevsky traveled to Ukraine in this context, intending to support pro-Russian forces. Rayevsky, a Russian citizen and ultranationalist, was previously known for being a member of the Russian nationalist and monarchist movement Black Hundreds, and has been described as a Neo-Nazi. He arrived in the city on 19 March, posed as a local resident, and set up base in Odesskaya Druzhina's pro-Russian tent camp in "Kulikovo Field". He joined the group, and trained pro-Russian protestors in "close combat". On VKontakte, he described the group he was training with as "Odessa brigade". Rayevsky and the group subsequently took part in pro-Russian demonstrations in Odesa. At one point, Rayevsky proposed to Odesskaya Druzhina that they should murder the local pro-Ukrainian Right Sector leader. According to Rayevsky, the leadership of "Odesskaya Druzhina" refused to accept this plan. The Ukrainian Security Service eventually arrested Rayevsky for trying to incite ethnic unrest and deported him back to Russia. From Saint Petersburg, he called for armed rebellion against the post-revolution Ukrainian government, calling upon Russians to "take up weapons" and "shed blood". Rayevsky would later fight in the war in Donbas before attempting to become a politician in Russia in 2021, which failed.

Despite Rayevsky's removal, the violence in Odesa continued to escalate. Another Russian citizen, Alexei "Foma" Fominov, had also risen to prominence in the local anti-Maidan movement. Fominov positioned himself as a Russian nationalist and later blamed Ukraine for the war in Donbas. He later claimed that he had served as "commandant of Kulikovo Field", referencing the tent camp outside the city where pro-Russian forces gathered. On 2 May, riots in Odesa resulted in the deadly Trade Unions House fire; many Russian nationalists such as Fominov subsequently left the city.

=== Activities in the Donbas ===
A number of these pro-Russian nationalists from Odesa ultimately relocated to Luhansk where Fominov reorganized them into a proper militia. The unit became known for including a large number of volunteers from Russia. Many of these had previously belonged to the "Yakut" militia. Under Fominov, the Odessa Brigade fought at Peremozhnoye, Luhansk International Airport, Izvaryne, Lutuhyne, Dolzhanske, Lysychansk, Georgievka, and Pervozvanivka. The group was involved in the kidnapping and murder of civilians in Peremozhne and Luhansk. These civilians were either known for pro-Ukrainian views or relatively wealthy. Ukrainian officials also claimed that the group was responsible for a number of bombings in Odesa from 2014 to 2015.

Though the unit fought for the separatist Luhansk People's Republic, it did not fully integrate itself into the Luhansk People's Republic Armed Forces. In January 2015, the Odessa Brigade was dissolved by the LPR. Troops of the Ministry of Internal Affairs of the LPR surrounded the militia's base, disarmed its fighters, and requested that the militants instead sign up for other units in the LPR Armed Forces. Though a large number of native Odessa Brigade members accepted this offer, most of the foreign volunteers refused and opted to return to Russia. Fominov was arrested on charges of criminal activity by LPR officials, though Ukrainian officials believed that his imprisonment and the Odesa Brigade's dissolution were more likely the result of power struggles within the LPR.

=== Later developments ===
During the 2022 Russian invasion of Ukraine, another pro-Russian "Odessa Brigade" was founded in the context of the Southern Ukraine campaign by regional collaborator Ihor Markov.

== Leadership and ideology ==
Anton Rayevsky, trainer of the anti-Maidan group called the "Odessa brigade", is a Russian ultranationalist and Neo-Nazi. He called for the annexation of Ukrainian territory by Russia. He has numerous Nazi-themed tattoos on his body, and an acquaintance of his reported that in school, Rayevsky would "calmly sit in the back row and read Mein Kampf". After leaving Odesa, Rayevsky joined other separatist groups before attempting to become a politician in Russia.

The commander of the original armed militia, Alexei "Foma" Fominov, generally posed as Russian nationalist and blamed Ukraine for the warfare in the region. Ukrainian media and officials believed that he had played a major role in escalating the 2014 Odesa clashes as well as in convincing Rodion Miroshyn, deputy of the Luhansk Regional Council, to defect to the separatists. After the 2015 dissolution of the Odessa Brigade, the Luhansk People's Republic prosecutor's office charged him with "murder, robbery and kidnapping of civilians".
