= Army Sports Club Stadium (Odesa) =

Sports venue in Odesa, Ukraine

- SKA
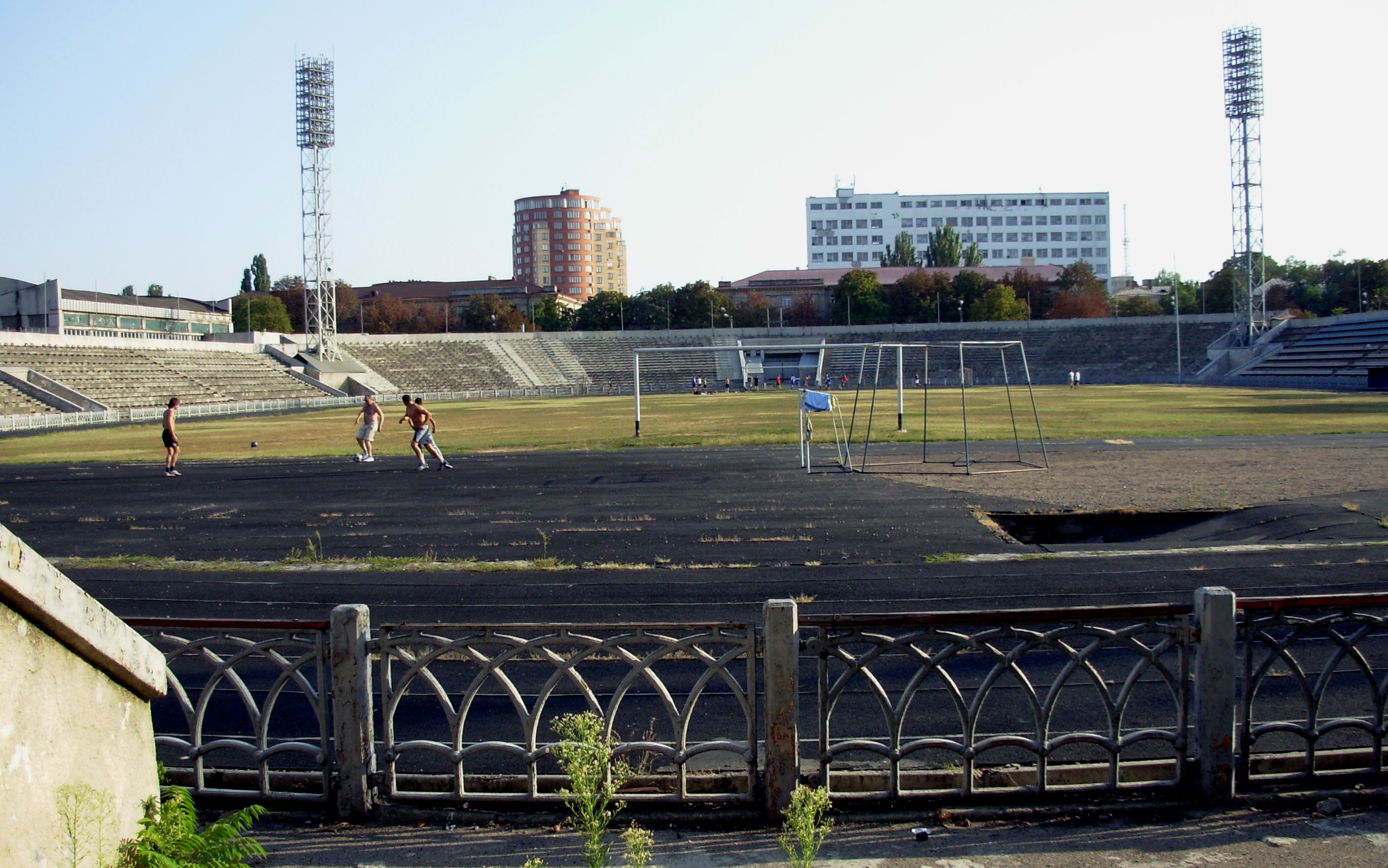
- Interactive map of Army Sports Club Stadium
- Location: Odesa, Ukraine
- Coordinates: 46°27′47″N 30°44′53″E
- Owner: Ministry of Defense (CSK ZSU)
- Capacity: 15,000 (football)
- Surface: Grass
- Field size: 105m by 68m

Construction
- Opened: 1966

Army Sports Club Stadium is a multi-use stadium in Odesa, Ukraine. The stadium holds 15,000 people.

The stadium is located close to the Kulykove Pole in Odesa, between Seminarska vulytsia and Pyrohovska vulytsia.

The stadium was built in 1966 in place of the old wooden Kharchovyk Stadium that existed in its place since 1927. The initiative to rebuild the stadium belonged to the Soviet general Hamazasp Babadzhanian.

The stadium was a home stadium of SKA Odesa and its successor municipal SC Odesa.

== See also ==
- Army Sports Club Stadium (Lviv)
