= Terwin =

Terwin may refer to:

- Johanna Terwin (1884–1962), German stage and film actress
- Terwin, a Ukrainian corporation
