= Roopal Patel =

Indian American luxury fashion consultant

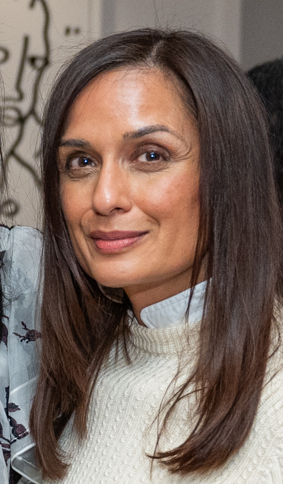
- Roopal Patel in 2024
- Occupation: Fashion consultant
- Known for: Luxury fashion consultant
- Website: http://www.roopalpatel.com

Roopal Patel is an Indian American luxury fashion consultant.

== Early life ==
Roopal Patel was born in United States to Indian parents. Both her parents are immigrants. Her father is a doctor. Patel's early exposure to traditional Indian attire through her mother's wardrobe had a significant impact on her career in the fashion industry. Patel attended law school at NYU. Her love of fashion, though, proved to be unstoppable, so Patel pursued a profession in the fashion industry because she wanted to explore her creative side.

== Career ==
Roopal Patel reports to Tracy Margolies, the chief merchant at Saks Fifth Avenue. Roopal was recently appointed as the Fashion Director at Saks Fifth Avenue. Roopal resigned as Senior Fashion Director at Neiman Marcus. She started her own luxury fashion consulting company in 2012 Now, one of her many clients is the CFDA Fashion incubator program. She was also a market editor at style.com. Roopal has been an advocate of bright colors in the fashion industry.
