= Cagni =

Cagni is an Italian surname. Notable people with the surname include:

- Luigi Cagni (born 1950), Italian footballer
- Pascal Cagni (born 1961), French business leader
- Umberto Cagni (1863–1932), Italian polar explorer
