= UkraineInvest =

Ukrainian advisory body

UkraineInvest (Ukraine Investment Promotion Office) was established on October 19, 2016, by a resolution of the Cabinet of Ministers of Ukraine No. 740 as an independent advisory body with a mandate to attract and support foreign direct investment (FDI) and to help improve Ukraine's image as a secure investment destination.

UkraineInvest engages in the following activities:

1. UkraineInvest provides a single-source office to provide foreign investors with appropriate resources, contacts and personal assistance, enhancing the ease of doing business in Ukraine to attract new investors (“Concierge Service”);
2. UkraineInvest engages in active outreach to potential partners in Ukraine and across the world for existing projects in Ukraine (Matchmaking/Outreach);
3. UkraineInvest provides relevant, concise and actionable information to foreign investors considering entering the Ukrainian market; publicizing the developing and dynamic story about opportunities for investing and doing business in Ukraine (Awareness/Communication);
4. UkraineInvest develops partnerships with other stakeholders to support this initiative: the existing business community, foreign embassies in Ukraine and Ukrainian embassies abroad, business associations, international financial institutions, and state agencies (Collaboration);
5. UkraineInvest identifies reoccurring obstacles facing investors and helps resolve issues in an appropriate manner through government channels (Advocacy);
6. UkraineInvest is committed to being transparent, fair, and focused on long-term strategy and success for longer-term economic growth.

UkraineInvest was created by Daniel Bilak, a Canadian lawyer who was closely involved in the country's development since 1991. Between 2016 and 2019, he was an investment advisor to Prime Minister Volodymyr Groysman and created UkraineInvest, the government's investment promotion agency. Bilak was also an active member of the Ukrainian Freedom Fund, which financed the Territorial Defense Forces.

Since the 2022 Russian invasion of Ukraine, foreign interests in Ukrainian investments boomed. Between March 2022 and September 2023, foreign investments channeled by UkraineInvest reached $500 million. Many investments were also aimed at developing Western multinationals' assets in Ukraine. In March 2024, UkraineInvest signed a memorandum of cooperation with the UN Global Compact to encourage sustainable business policies, and established the Ukraine Business Compact to facilitate the participation of foreign assets to the country's recovery. UkraineInvest had previously signed a memorandum of cooperation with Business France.

== Sectors ==
UkraineInvest highlights Ukraine's benefits to foreign investors in its 1+4 sector strategy when promoting those economic sectors where Ukraine enjoys a distinct comparative advantage:

1. Innovation Technologies (artificial intelligence, cyber security, nanotechnologies).
2. Agribusiness (food processing, primary production),
3. Energy (esp. renewables and energy-efficiency),
4. Manufacturing (clusters – automotive, aerospace, pharmaceuticals),
5. Infrastructure (ports and airports, transportation infrastructure).

These factors are complemented by Ukraine's developing high-tech industries which provide encompassing innovative value. Collectively, they assist with unlocking new investment and help Ukraine's integration into the global value chain of world markets.

== Activity ==
On 10 November 2023, UkraineInvest signed a memorandum with Terwin Corporation to support an investment project worth over $500 million with the possibility of expanding to $1 billion. This investment project involves the construction of four logistics complexes with an area of 1 million square metres.

== Directors ==
Daniel Bilak is the Director of the Investment Promotion Office and Chief Investment Adviser to the Prime Minister of Ukraine. Daniel Bilak was appointed Director of UkraineInvest and Chief Investment Adviser to the Prime Minister of Ukraine by the Cabinet of Ministers of Ukraine as of November 1, 2016. Together with the Government Commissioner for Investments, he guides investors and advises the Prime Minister on improvements to the investment and business environment in Ukraine. A Canadian-qualified lawyer with over 25 years of professional experience in Ukraine and the region, he previously advised major international and Ukrainian businesses in the energy, agribusiness, infrastructure and technology sectors. He was most recently the Managing Partner of the Ukraine office of the global law firm CMS Cameron McKenna. He also acted as Counsel to the Business Ombudsman Institution and for many years served as a senior United Nations Development Program (UNDP) governance expert to the Ukrainian government.

== See also ==
- Investment promotion agency
