= Pascal Cagni =

French businessman

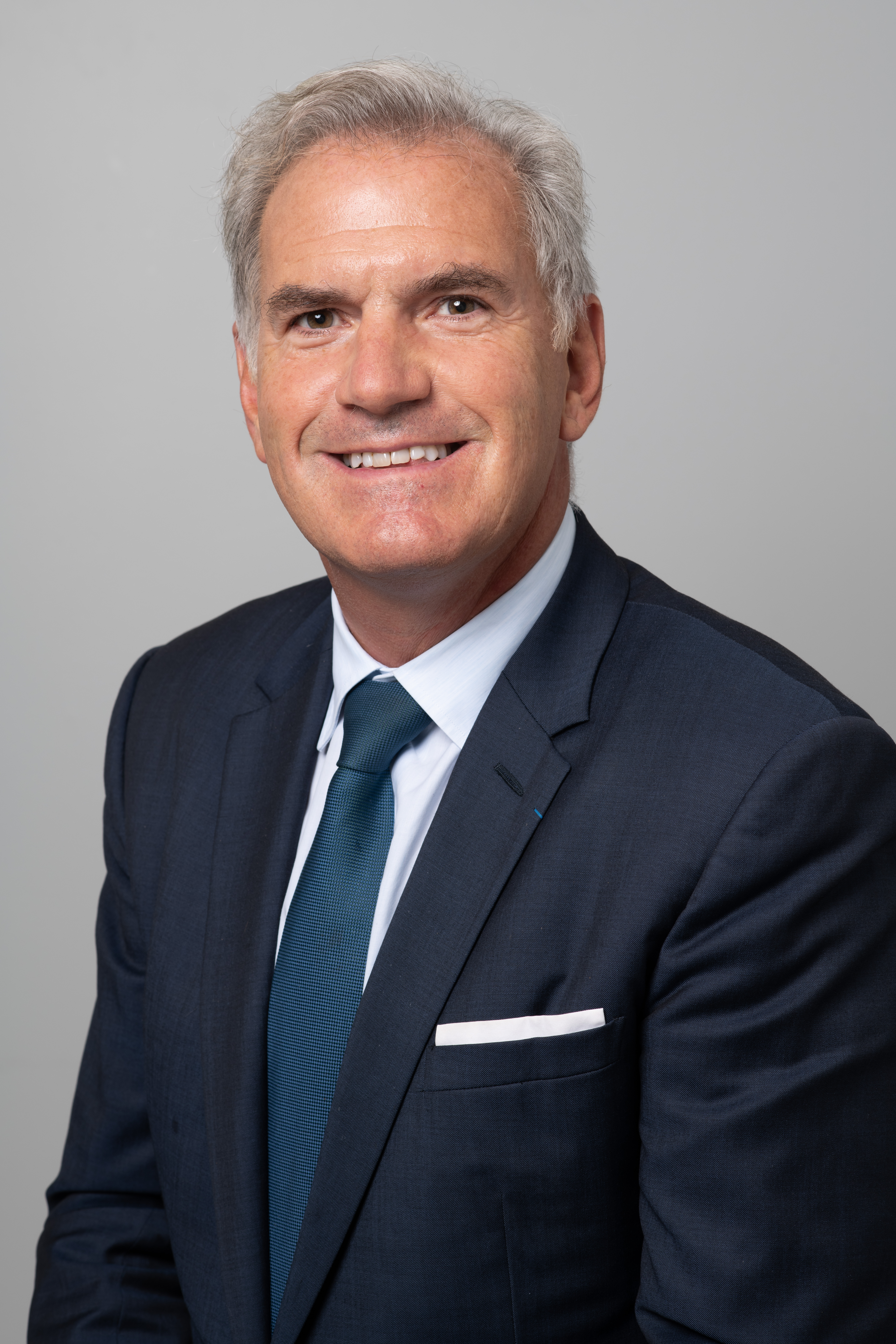

Business France chairperson
- Incumbent
- Assumed office 2017-09-14
- Preceded by: Seybah Dagoma

France Ambassador for International Investments
- Incumbent
- Assumed office 2017-09-14
- Preceded by: Muriel Pénicaud

President of C4 Industries
- Incumbent
- Assumed office 2004

Personal details
- Born: 28 October 1961 (age 64) Cernay (Haut-Rhin), France
- Education: Sciences Po, Stanford University, HEC Paris, Strasbourg III University
- Profession: Business executive
- Awards: Knight Ordre national du Mérite (2006), Knight Legion of Honor (2021)
- Website: Business France

Pascal Cagni, born on October 28, 1961, in Cernay, Alsace, is a French business executive. Between 2000 and 2012, he was Apple's vice president of Europe, the Middle East, and Africa. Cagni is the founder and president of entrepreneurial platform C4 Industries and president of Maison Lelièvre, Faïencerie de Gien, and Duvivier Canapés 1840. In 2017, he was appointed chairman of the board of directors of the Business France French government agency and Ambassador Delegate for International Investments by French President Emmanuel Macron. He was reappointed to this position in May 2025.

== Biography ==
=== Youth, education and private life ===
Born on October 28, 1961, in Cernay (Haut Rhin), Pascal Cagni studied at the Lycée Scheurer-Kestner in Thann. According to the French newspaper DNA, "he grew up in a multicultural environment, combining the rigor and seriousness of Alsace with the creativity of his Lombard Italian origins".

He is a graduate of the Paris Institute of Political Studies (Sciences Po) public service section (1984), the Paris School of Advanced Business Studies (HEC Paris MBA, class of 1986) and the University of Strasbourg III Robert Schumann in business law (1984).

He completed the Executive Program for Growing Companies (EPGC) at Stanford University in 1997 and was an auditor for the 63rd National Session of the Institute of Higher National Defense Studies (IHEDN) in 2010.

He is married with four children: Inès, Diane, Paul, Charles.

=== Early career ===
In 1986, he joined Booz Allen Hamilton as a strategy consultant. In 1988, he joined Compaq as Marketing Manager. He left Compaq in 1991 to join Software Publishing Corporation (SPC) and set up the group's first Southern European branch in Nice, before taking over as head of marketing and business development for the European region in London.

=== Packard Bell NEC ===
He joined Packard Bell in 1995, helping to set up a global engineering, production and operations center in Angers with over 1,500 employees. He played a critical role in establishing a new R&D, manufacturing facilities and operations, creating over 3 000 jobs in the Loire Valley (western France). He also established a pan-European sales and marketing structure. In 1997, he became Vice President, General Manager Europe of Packard Bell, the main division of the NEC Computer International group, formed by the merger of Packard Bell, Zenith Data Systems, Brett and NEC. Under his leadership, Packard Bell became the number one player in the European consumer PC market.

=== Apple ===
In 2000, he was recruited directly by Steve Jobs, who appointed him vice-president and general manager of Apple Europe, Middle East, India and Africa (EMEIA). In 12 years, under his leadership, Apple EMEIA posted, quarter after quarter, the strongest growth in the Apple group, with sales rising from $1.3 billion to over $40 billion[6].

He also strengthened the positioning of the Apple brand with the creation of the Apple Premium Reseller (APR) network, a concept exported by Apple worldwide, representing to date more than 1,200 stores with sales of over $8 billion, and the establishment of Apple Shops.

He left the Group on October 31, 2012.

== C4 entrepreneurial platform ==
In 2004, Pascal Cagni founded the entrepreneurial platform C4, whose mission is to support entrepreneurs in their projects. It includes C4 Industries, anchor investor in several companies focused on heritage and green transition; C4 Ventures, a European venture capital fund with a portfolio of over 50 startups, including nine unicorns; C4 Collection, a para-hotel group; and the Cagni Foundation C4.

=== C4 Industries ===
Since 2004, C4 Industries has invested in industrial companies that preserve heritage and promote the green transition through C4 Manufactures, while also making strategic minority investments through C4 Participations.

C4 Manufactures is a key investor in Maison Lelièvre, a three-century-old French company specializing in upholstery fabrics and a member of the Comité Colbert, as well as in Crime Science Technology, which focuses on securing identity documents. In 2025, C4 invested in Arc – the international leader in tableware, which is celebrating its 200th anniversary this year. In September 2025, C4 Industries acquired the Faïencerie de Gien, a 200-year-old French earthenware manufacturer, and in November 2025, Duvivier canapés 1840.

C4 Participations’ portfolio includes Cleeng, ELCA, Freelance, and iPulse.

=== C4 Ventures ===
In 2014, Pascal Cagni founded a venture capital investment fund called C4 Ventures with Christophe Walewski, Olivier Huez and Boris Bakech. He was later joined by Michel Sassano (2018) and Eric Boustouller (2022), former President of Microsoft France and Western Europe.

Based in Paris, the company supports entrepreneurs as majority lead investor in Series A and co-investor in subsequent rounds. It has invested in over 48 fast-growing companies around three major themes: Smart Hardware, Future of Commerce and Future of Work, based on technologies (artificial intelligence, Web3, blockchain, cybersecurity, quantum computing) leading to a paradigm shift in IT.

Between 2014 and 2022, C4 Ventures has supported half a dozen unicorns, placing the VC in the top 10 of French early-stage investors.

Its second fund C4 Ventures II, regulated by the AMF, opened in Paris in 2020. In September 2025, C4 Ventures III was launched, a 100M€ fund focused on AI and deep tech. The most recent investments (2026): Bedrock Robotics and news Yann Le Cun's startup AMI Labs. Today, C4 Ventures' portfolio counts more than 50 startups, 16 of which have become unicorns.

=== Villa Cagni Troubetzkoy and C4 Collection ===
Between September 2012 and May 2021, Pascal Cagni led a major restoration project of Villa Cagni Troubetzkoy. Built in 1848 by a Russian prince, this singular residence, located across from Villa d’Este on Lake Como, Italy, had fallen into oblivion until it was rediscovered by the Cagni family in 2009.

In 2024, Flammarion’s Styles and Design published a book dedicated to this restoration, under the direction of researcher Alexandra Campbell.

Today, Villa Cagni Troubetzkoy is operated by the C4 Collection para-hotel group.

== Business France ==
In August 2017, Pascal Cagni was appointed Chairman of the Board of Directors of the Business France agency and Ambassador Delegate for International Investments by French President Emmanuel Macron. He was reappointed to this position in May 2025.

He works to promote and enhance France as a host country for international investment, notably at major economic events, by regularly explaining the reforms carried out in France, by maintaining permanent, high-level contact with foreign investors or by leading networks of influence on the economic and international stage.

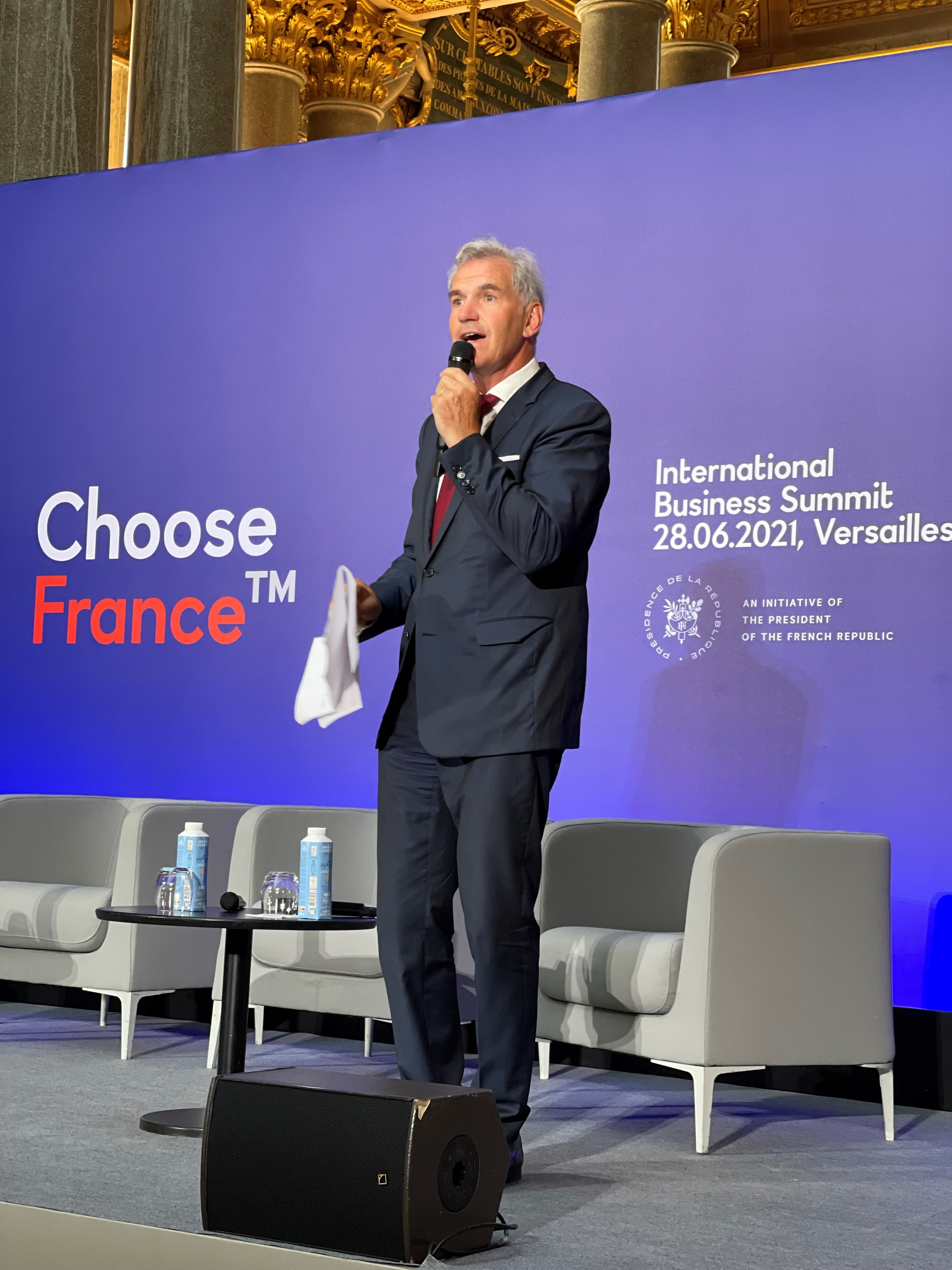
Pascal Cagn at Choose France summit (June 2021)

Since taking up his post in 2017, he has met face-to-face with over 800 foreign business leaders, and France has steadily risen in the European economic attractiveness rankings, reaching 1st place in terms of the number of international projects in 2019.

In particular, Pascal Cagni helped set up the now annual Choose France Summit in Versailles, an event initiated by the French President in 2018. The 6th edition took part in May 2023. With a total of 28 announcements, worth a total of €13 billion in investments and accounting for more than 8,000 jobs (excluding Manpower interim positions), the sixth “Choose France” Summit confirms France’s place as a leader in Europe for foreign direct investment (FDI).

Since 2019, Pascal Cagni has been the president of the jury for the Choose France Awards jury, honoring foreign investors who have chosen France. The 5th edition of this annual meeting of investors, organized in partnership with the States of France (États de la France) in November 2023, rewarded GSK, Amadeus, FedEx and Iveco Group.

Pascal Cagni is also one of the central players in the Scale-Up Tour initiative, launched by Emmanuel Macron in 2018, whose primary aim was to boost foreign financial investment in French Tech start-ups. Having become Scale-Up Europe in 2021, the project now aspires, more globally, to federate major European innovation players to achieve an effect of scale and foster the emergence of a continent-wide tech ecosystem.

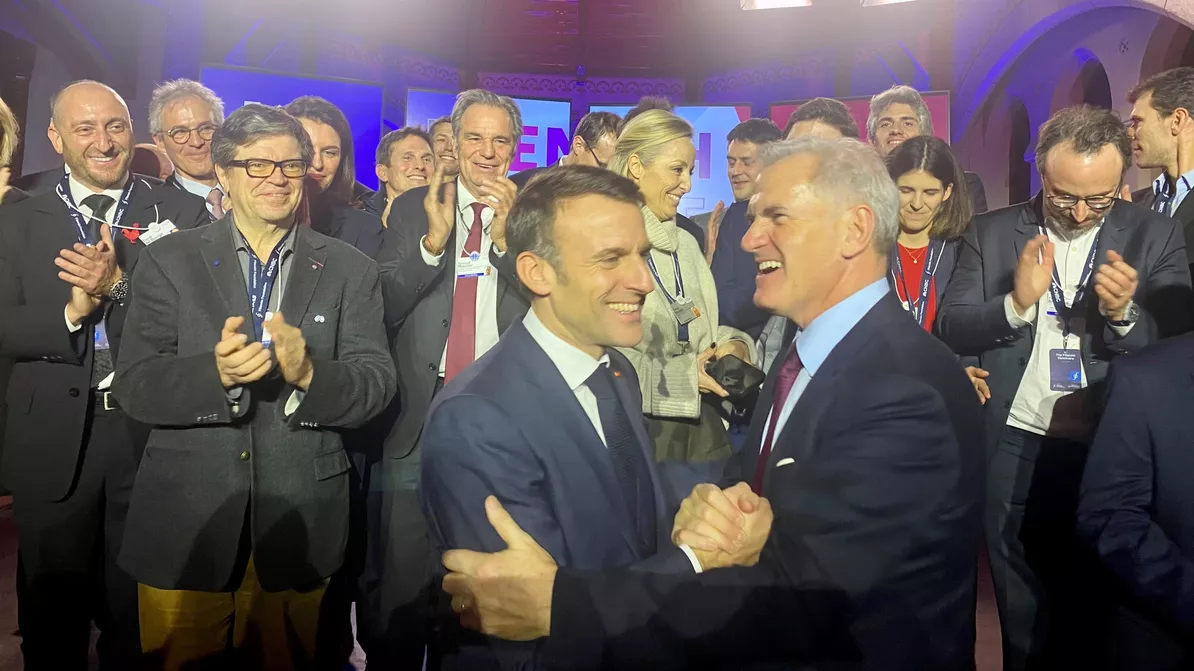
Emmanuel Macron and Pascal Cagni, the president of Business France, during the French Soirée organized in Davos in 2024. Ivan Letessier, Le Figaro

In January 2024, Pascal Cagni took an active part in several key events such as the Destination France Summit, bringing together public and private players for exchanges around French know-how, innovation and investment opportunities, as well as state visits to India and Sweden (the first one since 2000), and the World Economic Forum in Davos, alongside French President Emmanuel Macron and a delegation of 20 French start-ups.

On May 13, 2024, the “Choose France” summit resulted in record investment announcements totaling 15 billion euros for 56 projects. At the same time, EY ranked France as the leading destination for international investments in Europe for the fifth consecutive year.

During the summer, Pascal Cagni participated in the “Terre de Champions” initiative led by Business France during the Paris Olympic and Paralympic Games. He joined two visits with the President of the Republic: one in New York in September during the United Nations General Assembly (September 22–27) and another in Saudi Arabia in December. Additionally, from December 2 to 5, he took part in the presidential visit to Saudi Arabia.

In January 2025, Pascal Cagni participated in the World Economic Forum in Davos and, in February 2025, in the Artificial Intelligence Action Summit in Paris.

=== Franco-Italian cooperation and the Quirinal Treaty ===
In 2018, Pascal Cagni was appointed a member of the Quirinal Treaty working group, an initiative driven by Emmanuel Macron and Paolo Gentiloni, which aims to improve Franco-Italian relations and cooperation, particularly in the fields of industry and culture. "We are culturally, linguistically, historically and economically very close. But for a long time this closeness was taken for granted, without being nurtured like the Franco-German relationship with the Elysée and Aachen Treaties," he recalls in his interview with Club Italie-France. The aim of the Quirinal Treaty is to increase cooperation between France and Italy on a wide range of subjects, including the economy, technology, industry, defense, space policy and foreign policy. In each of these areas, Pascal Cagni has helped to establish clear commitments. Among them: the establishment of a joint support program for technological innovation for SMEs and start-ups, to stimulate their cross-border cooperation. The Treaty, signed by Emmanuel Macron and Mario Draghi on Friday November 26, 2021, is very rare in Europe: it is only the second treaty signed by France after that of the Elysée, initialed in 1963 with Germany, completed by that of Aachen in 2019. In October 2024, he took part in a conference on France’s attractiveness to Italian investors in Rome.

== Other mandates ==
Since November 2024, Pascal Cagni has been a board member of the Public Institution of the Château, Museum, and National Estate of Versailles.

He has also been an independent director of Banque Transatlantique (CIC Group) since 2006.

He was a non-executive director of Kingfisher Plc (2010–2019), a member of Vivendi's Supervisory Board (2012-2017)[22], and a non-executive director of Style.com, the Condé Nast Group's online sales site (2015-2017).

In 2014, he led a strategic review of the Net-A-Porter Group on behalf of Richemont and drew up a recovery plan including an improved sales strategy and information systems, preparing the group for its merger with Yoox.

Pascal Cagni is a member of the Cercle Outre-Manche], which aims to highlight best practices in France and the UK. He was also appointed French Foreign Trade Advisor to the UK in 2009.

Since 2014, he has been a member of the Global Commission on Internet Governance (GCIG), which makes recommendations on the future of Internet governance.

== Distinctions ==
Pascal Cagni received the insignia of Knight of the National Order of Merit of France from Christine Lagarde in 2006.

In January 2021, he was decorated Knight of the Legion of Honor by the French Minister of the Economy, Bruno Le Maire, for his commitment to the public interest in the economic field.

== Charity work ==
Pascal Cagni created The Cagni Foundation in 2011 to help young people from disadvantaged backgrounds gain access to higher education, art and culture. He is also one of the main benefactors of the HEC Foundation.
