= Roger-Gérard Schwartzenberg =

French politician (born 1943)

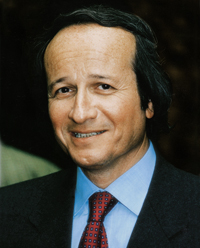

Member of the National Assembly for Val-de-Marne's 3rd constituency
- In office 20 June 2012 – 20 June 2017
- Preceded by: Didier Gonzales
- Succeeded by: Laurent Saint-Martin

Minister of Research
- In office 27 March 2000 – 6 May 2002
- President: Jacques Chirac
- Prime Minister: Lionel Jospin
- Preceded by: Claude Allègre
- Succeeded by: Luc Ferry

Personal details
- Born: 17 April 1943 (age 83) Pau, France
- Party: Radical Party of the Left
- Profession: Jurist

Roger-Gérard Schwartzenberg (born 17 April 1943) is a French politician of the Radical Party of the Left (French: Parti Radical de Gauche, PRG).

== Biography ==
He has been a Member of the European Parliament (1979–1983), a deputy to the National Assembly (1986–2007; he was defeated in the 2007 elections, but regained his seat in 2012) and a government minister (1983–1986, 2000–2002). He is a law professor at Panthéon-Assas University. From 1981 to 1983 he was President of the Movement of Radicals of the Left (Mouvement des Radicaux de Gauche, the forerunner of the PRG) in the French Parliament.

He is also known as a popular political theoretician especially in his book L'etat Spectacle originally written in 1977 (Flammarion) and subsequently rewritten to include female political role models (Angela Merkel in particular) in 2009 (Plon) and his other major work La Politique du Mensonge (Odile Jacob 1998). He posits politics as a shadow show with stereotypical characters and plots. Main actors include "The Man of the People" (Jimmy Carter), "The Hero" (Putin), "Father/Mother of the Nation" (originally François Mitterrand and subsequently Angela Merkel) and "The charmer" (Blair). Strategically his analysis is allied to game theory where politicians play roles to contrast with their opponents and provides a tool for analysing electoral tactics. His work is virtually unknown in the Anglo-Saxon world.

During his tenure as minister for research and technology in the French Government between 2000 and 2002, Schwartzenberg played a key role in confirming investments in some large-scale science and research infrastructure projects. In 2000, he gave the go-ahead to a major synchrotron project at Saclay near Paris, called SOLEIL. The project had previously been cancelled, by his predecessor Claude Allègre. In 2002, he extended the agreement with the European Space Agency on the continued use of Europe's spaceport, the Guiana Space Centre, and for the continued use there of the Ariane launcher.

In 2001, Schwartzenberg generated some controversy around the awarding of the Nobel Prize in Chemistry. The award was given that year to three scientists for their work on catalytic asymmetric synthesis. Schwartzenberg publicly announced that he considered that the award should have recognised the French scientist, Henri B. Kagan, as a pioneer in the field. Twenty-five years later, in 2026, Kagan was jointly awarded the Nobel Prize with Kensō Soai "for the discovery of non-linear effects and autocatalysis in asymmetric organic synthesis."
