= Terwin (corporation) =

Ukrainian corporation

TERWIN
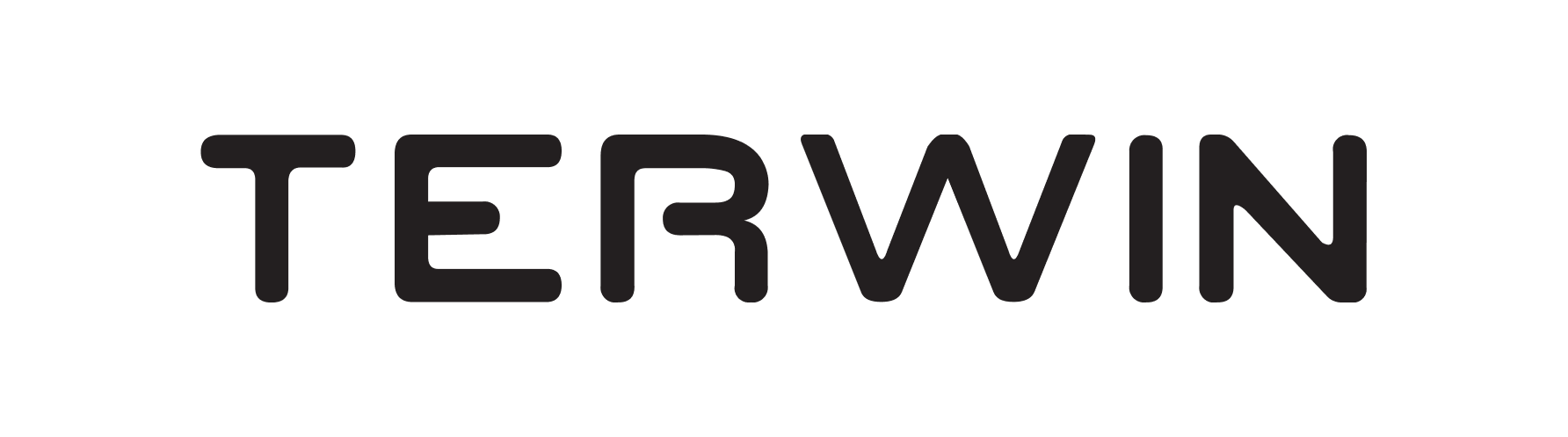
- Type: corporation
- Industry: asset management, retail, development, car business, charity
- Founded: 2023
- Founder: Ruslan Shostak
- Headquarters: 37, Zaporizke Shosse St., Dnipro, Ukraine
- Services: financial services, asset management
- Revenue: USD 1,7 billion (2023)
- Total assets: USD 1,6 billion
- Website: https://terwin.com.ua/

Terwin (Ukrainian: Тервін) is a Ukrainian corporation that unites assets managed and co-owned by Ruslan Shostak. The corporation employs 30,000 people in 17 companies.

The corporation of Ruslan Shostak, co-owner of EVA and VARUS retail chains, includes all of his businesses, in particular in the field of retail trade of food products and drugstore goods, development and car businesses.

== History ==
Terwin Group Limited Liability Company was registered in October 2016 in the city of Dnipro. Initially, the company was engaged in providing accounting and audit services, as well as tax consulting.

On 26 October 2023, the Anti-Monopoly Committee of Ukraine allowed Ruslan Shostak Charitable Foundation to establish the Terwin Group Corporation (Terwin Group). Shostak at the time said that the decision was made to unite into a corporation to easier manage operations.

== WINHUB ==
On 10 November 2023, Terwin Corporation signed a memorandum with UkraineInvest, the government's investment promotion office, to support an investment project totalling more than $500 million with the possibility of expanding to $1 billion. The WINHUB investment project concerns the construction of four logistics complexes — class "A" warehouses with an area of 1 million square meters in the Lviv, Kyiv, Odesa and Dnipropetrovsk regions of Ukraine. The WINHUB project is included in the Investment Guide of Ukraine from the Ministry of Economy and KSE Institute, presented at the Ukraine Recovery Conference 2024 in Berlin. In March 2025, Terwin also signed a memorandum with DELTA Ukraine, a subsidiary of Delta AG. Under the terms, DELTA agreed to provide its support in the development of WINHUB.

The project first started with the Odesa warehouse called "Tavriia". By March 2025, Tavriia had attracted an additional investment of $18 million and was 30% complete, and tenants had already moved in, including Terwin's EVA and Varus. The total estimated cost for Tavriia is set to be $245 million, and the complex, once additional land is bought, would reach 350,000 square meters. The second WINHUB logistics park was started in March 2026 when Twerin acquired an 18-hectare land plot in the village of Mriia which is in the Dmytrivka rural hromada, and is 7 km from Kyiv. This was the first of ten site that were set to be acquired for the project in the year 2026, and construction was set to begin at the Mriia location in the second quarter of 2026.

== Composition and assets ==
The corporation consists of 16 companies: Omega (Varus grocery supermarket chain), Rush (Eva body care chain), Tervin Group, Tixid, Tavria Hub, Myttyeva, Formsite, Digamma, Milton Group, Saltora Plus, Ariant Firm, Nove Budivnytstvo 2017, Altair D, Apex N, Aspect D, Lattero, and the Shostak Charitable Foundation.

The total assets of the corporation are estimated at $1.6 billion. The total revenue of the companies in the pre-war period reached $2 billion, and in 2023 was expected to reach $1.7 billion.
