= Laurent Saint-Martin =

French politician (born 1985)

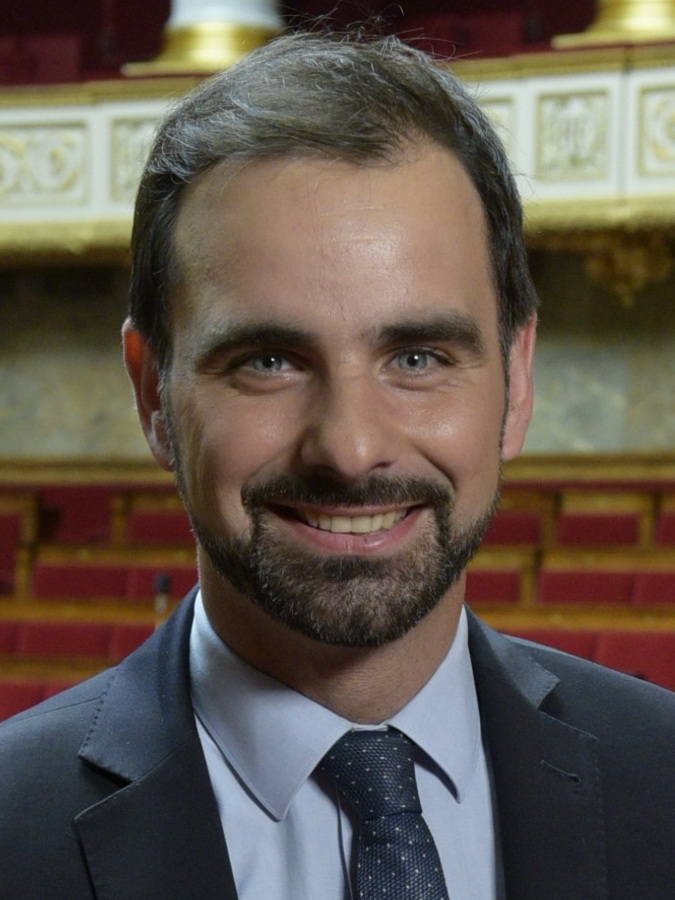
- Saint-Martin in 2017

Minister delegate for Foreign trade and French living abroad
- In office 23 December 2024 – 5 October 2025
- Prime Minister: François Bayrou

Minister delegate for the Budget and Public Accounts
- In office 21 September 2024 – 23 December 2024
- Prime Minister: Michel Barnier
- Preceded by: Thomas Cazenave
- Succeeded by: Amélie de Montchalin

Member of the Regional Council of Île-de-France
- Incumbent
- Assumed office 2 July 2021
- President: Valérie Pécresse

Member of the National Assembly for Val-de-Marne's 3rd constituency
- In office 21 June 2017 – 21 June 2022
- Preceded by: Roger-Gérard Schwartzenberg
- Succeeded by: Louis Boyard

Personal details
- Born: 22 June 1985 (age 41) Toulouse, France
- Party: Renaissance (2016-present); Socialist Party (2009-12)
- Education: EDHEC Business School

Laurent Saint-Martin (French pronunciation: [lɔʁɑ̃ sɛ̃ maʁtɛ̃]; born 22 June 1985) is a French politician who served as Minister delegate for Foreign trade and French living abroad in the government of Prime Minister François Bayrou from 2024 to 2025. He previously served briefly as Minister Delegate for the Budget and Public Accounts in the government of Prime Minister Michel Barnier from September to December 2024. A member of Renaissance (RE), he has also held a seat in the Regional Council of Île-de-France since 2021.

Prior to his appointment to the government, Saint-Martin served as Director General of Business France from 2023 to 2024.

Saint-Martin represented the 3rd constituency of the Val-de-Marne department in the National Assembly from 2017 to 2022 as a member of La République En Marche! (later renamed Renaissance).

== Political career ==
From 2009 until 2012, Saint-Martin was a member of the Socialist Party. However, he was not actively involved in politics before he joined La République En Marche! in 2016.

In the 2017 legislative election, Saint-Martin was elected to the National Assembly, where he represented the 3rd constituency of Val-de-Marne. He succeeded Roger-Gérard Schwartzenberg of the Radical Party of the Left. In Parliament, Saint-Martin served as a member of the Finance Committee. In addition to his committee assignments, he was part of the French-Peruvian Parliamentary Friendship Group.

In late 2018, Saint-Martin was offered to join the government of Prime Minister Édouard Philippe but declined a post as Secretary of State at the Ministry of the Economy and Finance under the leadership of Bruno Le Maire. In June 2019, Philippe entrusted him with a mission to reform the national system for the identification, seizure and confiscation of criminal assets. From 2020, Saint-Martin served as the Parliament's lead rapporteur on the annual budget of France; he succeeded Joël Giraud.

Within his party, Saint-Martin became a member of the executive board in 2019. In that capacity, he was entrusted alongside Guillaume Chiche for the party's policy planning.

In early 2021, Saint-Martin emerged as the frontrunner in the race to lead the La République En Marche! campaign in Île-de-France during that year's regional elections and to potentially succeed Valérie Pécresse as President of the Regional Council of Île-de-France. With only 9.62 percent of the vote, he ultimately lost against Pécresse but was elected as a regional councillor.

In the 2022 legislative election, Saint-Martin ran for reelection to the National Assembly but lost his seat to Louis Boyard of La France Insoumise.

== CEO of Business France, 2023–2024 ==
In 2022, Saint-Martin was appointed to head Business France, the government agency tasked with promoting French exports and foreign investments in France.

== Political positions ==
In 2018, Saint-Martin was one of Stanislas Guerini's first supporters when the latter ran for the post of LREM leader.

== See also ==
- List of MPs who lost their seat in the 2022 French legislative election
