= Val-de-Marne's 3rd constituency =

Constituency of the National Assembly of France

3rd constituency of Val-de-Marne
- inline Constituency of the National Assembly of France

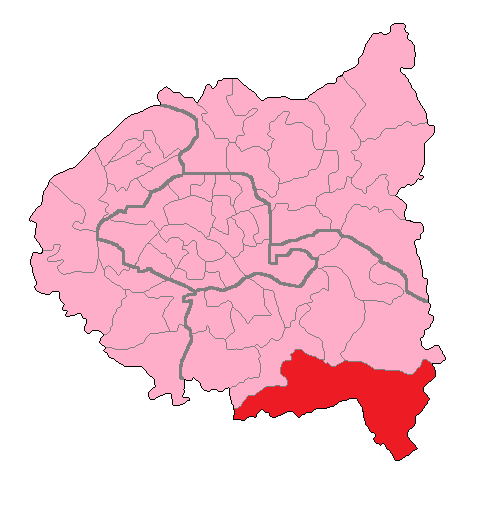
- Val-de-Marne's 3rd Constituency shown within Île-de-France
- Deputy: Louis Boyard; LFI
- Department: Val-de-Marne
- Cantons: Boissy-Saint-Léger - Valenton - Villecresnes - Villeneuve-le-Roi - Villeneuve-Saint-Georges
- Registered voters: 72,165

The 3rd constituency of Val-de-Marne is a French legislative constituency in the Val-de-Marne département.

== Description ==
The 3rd constituency of Val-de-Marne covers the south east corner of the department. The constituency lies to the east of Orly Airport and has a mix of light industrial and residential areas it also contains the largest area of green space in the department the Forêt de Notre-Dame.

The constituency returned Roger-Gérard Schwartzenberg of the PRG (Radical Party of the Left) at elections from 1988 until the 2007 when it was narrowly won by the UMP. Schwartzenberg reclaimed the seat at the 2012 election for one term losing to Laurent Saint-Martin of La République En Marche! at the 2017 election, who lost after one term to the left's Louis Boyard of LFI (La France Insoumise), and who held the seat in the snap 2024 elections.

== Historic representation ==
Election	Member	Party
1967	Georges Gosnat	PCF
1968	Georges Gosnat	PCF
1973	Georges Gosnat	PCF
1978	Georges Gosnat	PCF
1981	Georges Gosnat	PCF
1986	Proportional representation – no election by constituency	
1988	Roger-Gérard Schwartzenberg	PRG
1993	Roger-Gérard Schwartzenberg	PRG
1997	Roger-Gérard Schwartzenberg	PRG
2002	Roger-Gérard Schwartzenberg	PRG
2007	Didier Gonzales	UMP
2012	Roger-Gérard Schwartzenberg	PRG
2017	Laurent Saint-Martin	LREM
2022	Louis Boyard	LFI

== Election results ==
=== 2024 ===
Candidate	Party	Alliance	First round			Second round		
Candidate	Party	Alliance	Votes	%	+/–	Votes	%	+/–
Louis Boyard	LFI	NFP	19,290	42.17	+10.60	21,492	46.92	
Arnaud Barbotin	DVD	UXD	12,491	27.31	+13.51	13,810	30.15	
Loïc Signor	RE	ENS	10,871	23.77	-1.75	10,507	22.94	
Géraldine Telle	DIV		870	1.90	N/A			
Lucien Noaile	LO		651	1.42	+0.51			
Frédérique Poncet	REC		650	1.42	-2.84			
Noël Agossa	LR		602	1.32	-14.38			
Emmanuelly Gougougnan-Zadigue	DLF		315	0.69	-1.20			
Valid votes			45,740	96.55		45,809	97.19	
Blank votes			1,249	2.64	+0.89	1,015	2.15	
Null votes			385	0.81	+0.32	309	0.66	
Turnout			47,374	63.70	+21.44	47,133	63.35	
Abstentions			26,998	36.30	-21.44	27,272	36.65	
Registered voters			74,372			74,405		
Source: Ministry of the Interior, Le Monde
Result						LFI HOLD		

=== 2022 ===
Legislative Election 2022: Val-de-Marne's 3rd constituency
Party	Candidate	Votes	%	±%
LFI (NUPÉS)	Louis Boyard	9,655	31.57	+8.57
LREM (Ensemble)	Laurent Saint-Martin	7,804	25.52	-10.27
LR (UDC)	Didier Gonzales	4,801	15.70	−5.98
RN	Francs Pretot	4,221	13.80	+3.03
REC	Jean-Baptiste Abribat	1,303	4.26	N/A
PRG	Guillaume Poiret	873	2.85	N/A
Others	N/A	1,924	6.29	
Turnout		30,581	42.26	−1.21
2nd round result
LFI (NUPÉS)	Louis Boyard	15,087	51.98	N/A
LREM (Ensemble)	Laurent Saint-Martin	13,940	48.02	−3.62
Turnout		29,027	42.13	+4.69
LFI gain from LREM				

=== 2017 ===
Legislative Election 2017: Val-de-Marne's 3rd constituency
Party	Candidate	Votes	%	±%
LREM	Laurent Saint-Martin	10,975	35.79	N/A
LR	Didier Gonzales	6,650	21.68	−7.59
LFI	Nicolas Georges	4,334	14.13	N/A
FN	Dominique Bourse Provence	3,303	10.77	−4.44
PCF	Alexandre Boyer	1,443	4.71	−11.83
PS	Corinne Narassiguin	1,275	4.16	N/A
DLF	Emmanuelly Gougougnan-Zadigue	857	2.79	N/A
Others	N/A	1,831		
Turnout		31,369	43.47	−9.15
2nd round result
LREM	Laurent Saint-Martin	12,452	51.64	N/A
LR	Didier Gonzales	11,660	48.36	+0.68
Turnout		27,016	37.44	−13.54
LREM gain from PRG		Swing		

=== 2012 ===
Legislative Election 2012: Val-de-Marne's 3rd constituency
Party	Candidate	Votes	%	±%
UMP	Didier Gonzales	10,907	29.27	−9.71
PRG	Roger-Gérard Schwartzenberg	10,472	28.11	+0.37
FG	Joseph Rossignol	6,162	16.54	+8.46
FN	Dominique Joly	5,669	15.21	+10.16
EELV	Bruno Brossard	1,182	3.17	−0.38
MoDem	Sophie Dubois	963	2.58	−7.25
Others	N/A	1,905		
Turnout		37,260	52.62	−3.84
2nd round result
PRG	Roger-Gérard Schwartzenberg	18,776	52.02	+2.22
UMP	Didier Gonzales	17,319	47.98	−2.22
Turnout		36,095	50.98	−3.71
PRG gain from UMP				

=== 2007 ===
Legislative Election 2007: Val-de-Marne's 3rd constituency
Party	Candidate	Votes	%	±%
UMP	Didier Gonzales	14,887	38.98	+5.93
PRG	Roger-Gérard Schwartzenberg	10,588	27.74	−4.51
MoDem	Jean-Brice De Bary	3,751	9.83	N/A
PCF	Sylvie Altman	3,082	8.08	+1.09
FN	Jean-Paul Espinar	1,927	5.05	−8.50
LV	Cécile Duflot	1,356	3.55	+0.02
Far left	Jean-Michel Christiany	957	2.51	N/A
Others	N/A	1,624		
Turnout		38,775	56.46	−6.38
2nd round result
UMP	Didier Gonzales	18,319	50.20	+1.46
PRG	Roger-Gérard Schwartzenberg	18,171	49.80	−1.46
Turnout		37,558	54.69	=3.65
UMP gain from PRG				

=== 2002 ===
Legislative Election 2002: Val-de-Marne's 3rd constituency
Party	Candidate	Votes	%	±%
UMP	Marie-Michelle Bataille	12,834	33.05	N/A
PRG	Roger-Gérard Schwartzenberg	12,523	32.25	+3.30
FN	Lydia Schenardi	5,260	13.55	−3.21
PCF	Martine Girault	2,714	6.99	−8.32
LV	Bruno Bossard	1,369	3.53	N/A
Others	N/A	4,132		
Turnout		39,453	62.84	−3.56
2nd round result
PRG	Roger-Gérard Schwartzenberg	18,149	51.26	−4.23
UMP	Marie-Michelle Bataille	17,254	48.74	N/A
Turnout		36,631	58.34	−11.45
PRG hold				

=== 1997 ===
Legislative Election 1997: Val-de-Marne's 3rd constituency
Party	Candidate	Votes	%	±%
PRG	Roger-Gérard Schwartzenberg	11,683	28.95	
UDF	Christine Chauvet	9,897	24.52	
FN	Christian Le Scornec	6,765	16.76	
PCF	Michel Herry	6,180	15.31	
GE	Philippe Gaudin	1,531	3.79	
DVD	Jean-Claude Montgenie	1,190	2.95	
LO	Bernard Benyacar	883	2.19	
Others	N/A	2,229		
Turnout		41,828	66.40	
2nd round result
PRG	Roger-Gérard Schwartzenberg	23,071	55.49	
UDF	Christine Chauvet	18,505	44.51	
Turnout		43,962	69.79	
PRG hold				

== Sources ==
Official results of French elections from 2002: "Résultats électoraux officiels en France" (in French).
