= Ruslan Shostak =

Ukrainian businessman and philanthropist

- Руслан Шостак
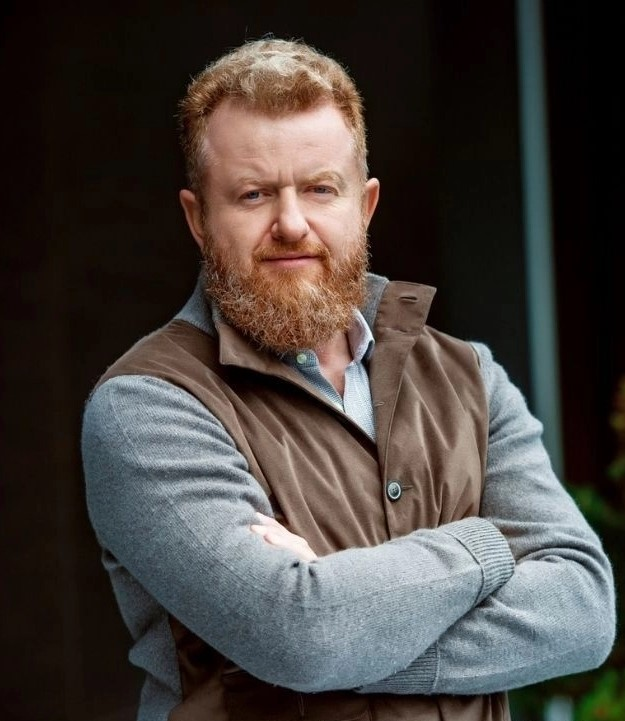
- Ruslan Shostak
- Born: March 20, 1973 (age 53); Dnipro, Ukrainian SSR, Soviet Union
- Citizenship: Ukraine
- Occupation: Businessman
- Known for: Owner, retail chain EVA; Owner, retail chain VARUS
- Children: 2

Ruslan Stanislavovych Shostak (Ukrainian: Руслан Станіславович Шостак; born March 20, 1973, Dnipro) is a Ukrainian businessman, founder and co-owner of the national retail chains EVA and VARUS. He is involved in the development of businesses in field such as real estate, car imports, and wholesaling. He is rated among the top 100 richest people in Ukraine. In 2022, he founded and develops the Ruslan Shostak Charitable Foundation, which in 2025 became the subject of a journalistic investigation and a report by the Office of the Ukrainian Parliament Commissioner for Human Rights. According to the findings, employees of the foundation committed physical and psychological abuse against children and forced them to appear in the foundation's promotional videos.

== Biography ==
Ruslan Shostak was born on March 20, 1973, in Dnipro. As a schoolboy, Shostak was engaged in commerce in the field of consumer goods (food, cosmetics). In 1992, he became one of the founders and managers of the Baby Food Association, the producer (Karapuz and Malyatko brands) and importer of baby food in Ukraine. In 2000–2003, he was the CEO and co-owner of Negociant, which owned The Pik supermarket chain. In 1999, he graduated from the Prydniprovska State Academy of Civil Engineering and Architecture with a degree in Business Economics, qualification as an economist.

In November 2002, he founded and became the CEO of RUSH (a perfume and cosmetics retail chain of EVA stores) and OMEGA (a grocery retail chain of VARUS supermarkets). In 2019, the turnover of the VARUS and EVA chains exceeded $1 billion.

As of 2020, Shostak was the owner or co-owner of the following companies: LLC "RUSH" — a national retail chain of EVA drogerie stores; OMEGA LLC — national chain of grocery supermarkets VARUS; Athena Group LLC - wholesale trade, contract logistics and foreign trade; KRAYTEX-Service LLC — wholesale trade. Shostak also participates in the development of businesses related to construction and real estate management, import and sale of cars.

In 2022, he founded the Ruslan Shostak Charitable Foundation, which specializes in helping the Ukrainian Defense Forces and victims of the Russian-Ukrainian war. It is engaged in the evacuation of orphans from Ukraine during the war — within the framework of the project "Childhood without War" and the purchase and supply of wheeled vehicles for the needs of the defenders of Ukraine, its service — within the framework of the project HEROYCAR.

In 2023, assets managed and co-owned by Ruslan Shostak were merged into Tervin Corporation. 30 thousand people work in 17 companies united in the corporation. The corporation included all Ruslan Shostak's businesses, in particular in the field of food retail and drug store goods, development and auto business.

Shostak is married. He has a daughter and a son.

== Wealth ==
Rating of the magazine Focus: 2014 — 99th place, $43 million; 2015 — 86th place, $50 million; 2016 — 68th place, $85 million; 2017 — 66th place, $98 million; 2018 — 42nd place, $195 million

Rating of Novoe Vremya: 2018 — 58th place, $107 million

Rating of Korrespondent magazine: 2018 — 45th place, $136 million

Rating of Forbes Ukraine: 2014 — 93rd place, $71 million; 2015 — 78th place, $43 million; 2016 — 69th place, $60 million 2021 — 87th place, $140 million

== Investigation ==
In 2024–2025 the foundation's activities became the subject of public debate after a monitoring visit by representatives of the Office of the Ukrainian Parliament Commissioner for Human Rights to facilities in Turkey where evacuated orphaned children were living. A monitoring-group report published to journalists described alleged violations of the children's rights, including restrictions on access to education and medical care, the use of physical and psychological pressure, prohibiting external organisations from visiting the children, and involving minors in the production of promotional videos and charitable materials. Following the published findings, law enforcement authorities opened a criminal investigation; the case was later closed due to insufficient evidence.

== Awards ==
- Order of Merit, III degree (Ukraine, August 23, 2022) — for significant personal merits in strengthening interstate cooperation, support for state sovereignty and territorial integrity of Ukraine, significant contribution to the popularization of the Ukrainian state in the world.
