= Didier Gonzales =

French politician (born 1960)

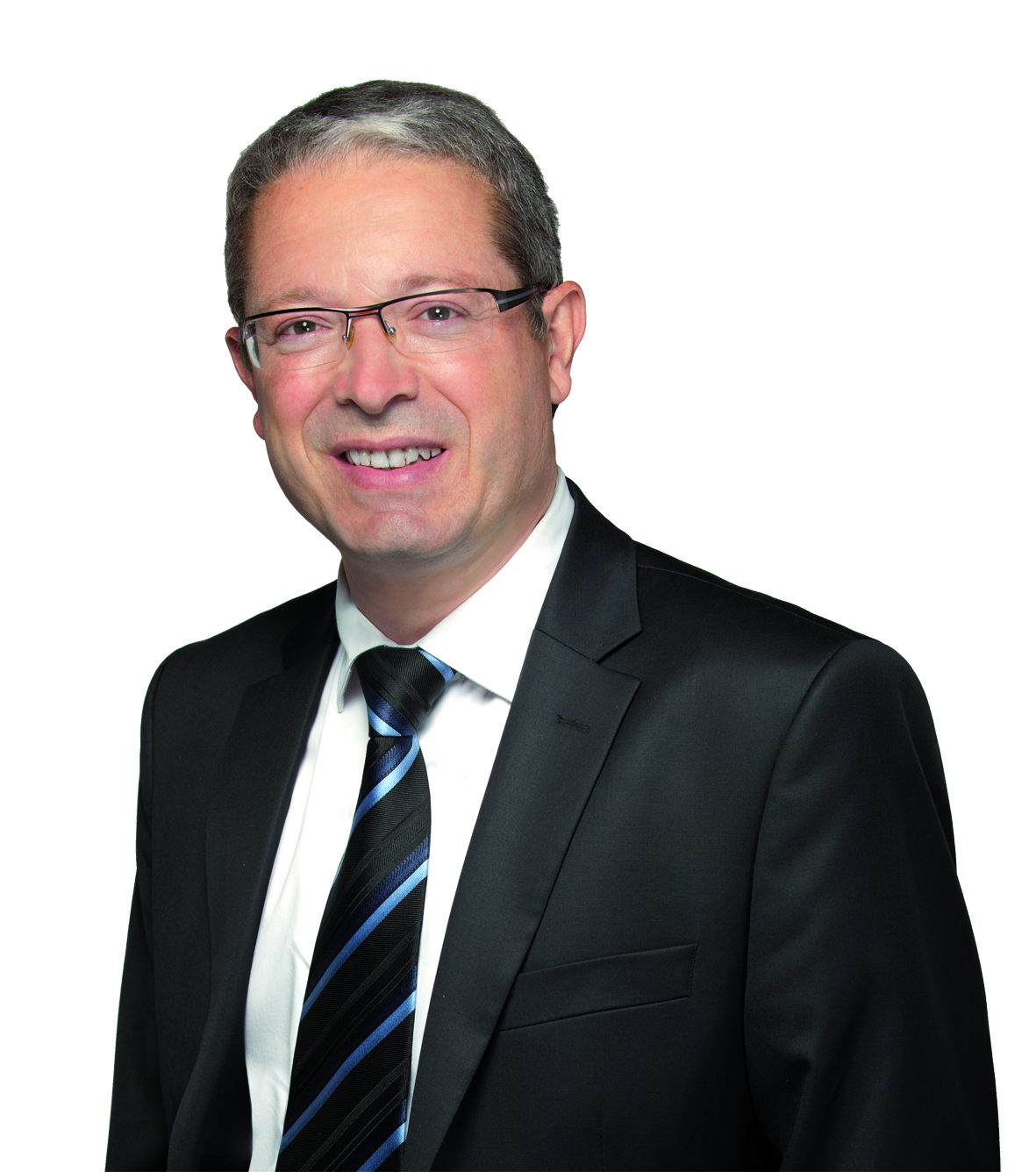
- Didier Gonzales in 2012

Mayor of Villeneuve-le-Roi
- Incumbent
- Assumed office 19 March 2001
- Preceded by: Michel Herry

Member of the National Assembly for Val-de-Marne's 3rd constituency
- In office 20 June 2007 – 20 June 2012
- Preceded by: Roger-Gérard Schwartzenberg
- Succeeded by: Roger-Gérard Schwartzenberg

Personal details
- Born: 14 September 1960 (age 65) Sidi Bel Abbès, Algeria
- Party: UMP

Didier Gonzales (born 14 September 1960 in Sidi Bel Abbès) is a member of the National Assembly of France. He represents the Val-de-Marne department, and is a member of the Union for a Popular Movement.
