= Louis Boyard =

French politician (born 2000)

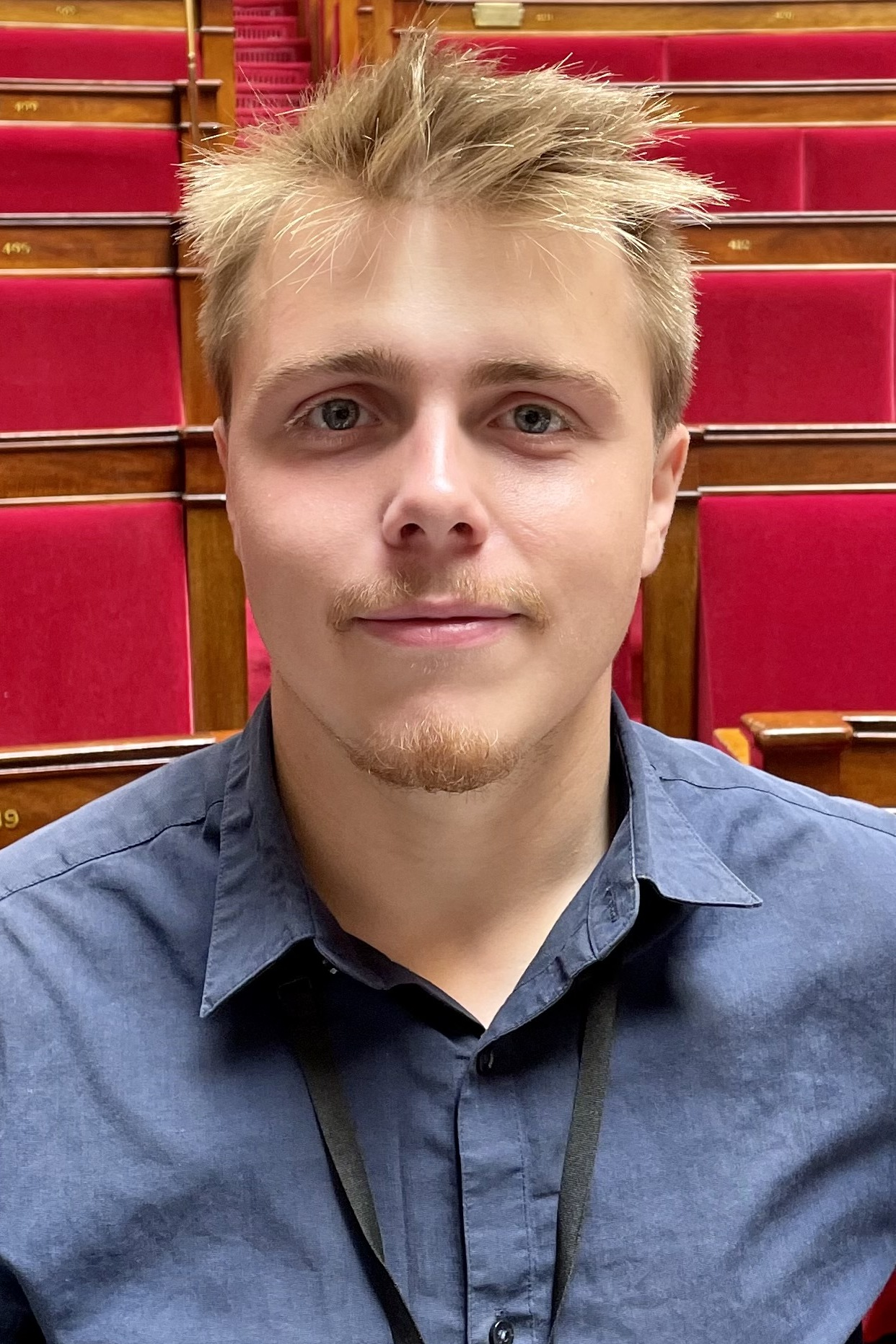
- Louis Boyard in the National Assembly in 2022

Member of the National Assembly for Val-de-Marne's 3rd constituency
- Incumbent
- Assumed office 22 June 2022
- Preceded by: Laurent Saint-Martin

President of the Union Nationale Lycéenne
- In office 2018–2019
- Preceded by: Clara Jaboulay
- Succeeded by: Héloïse Moreau

Personal details
- Born: 26 August 2000 (age 25) Fontenay-le-Comte, France
- Political party: La France Insoumise

Louis Boyard (French pronunciation: [lwi bwajaʁ]; born 26 August 2000) is a French politician from La France Insoumise. He was elected deputy for Val-de-Marne's 3rd constituency in the 2022 French legislative election. He defeated Laurent Saint-Martin and is the second youngest deputy in French history.

Boyard unsuccessfully ran for mayor of Villeneuve-Saint-Georges in a 2025 special election, becoming a municipal councillor in the opposition instead.

== See also ==
- List of deputies of the 16th National Assembly of France
