= Varus (supermarket) =

Ukrainian supermarket chain

Omega LLC
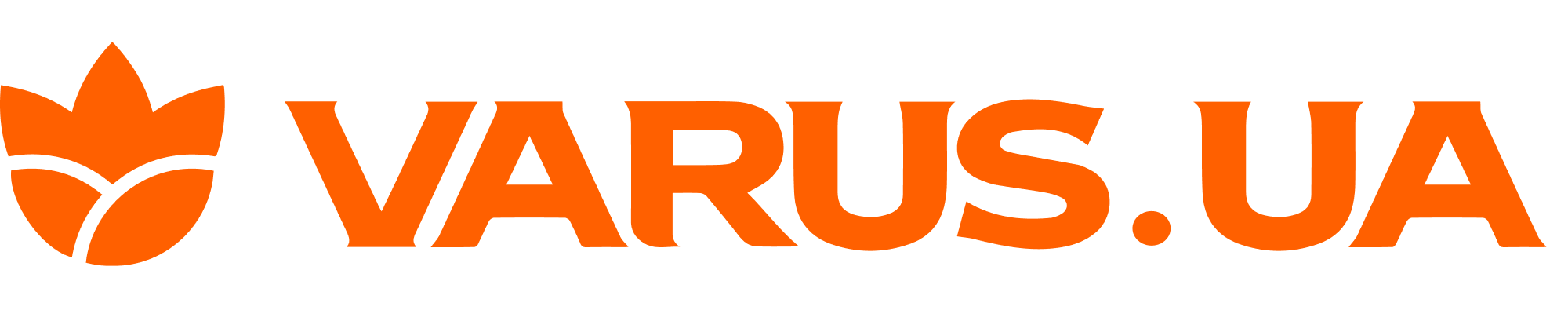
- Native name: ТОВ «Омега»
- Type: Limited liability company
- Industry: Retail; E-commerce
- Founded: 2003; 23 years ago
- Founder: Weygant Enterprises Limited (Cyprus)
- Headquarters: Dnipro, Ukraine
- Number of locations: 113
- Area served: Ukraine
- Key people: Volodymyr Bezuhlyi (CEO)
- Products: Food products Non-food products
- Revenue: ▲ ₴12.22 billion (2020)
- Operating income: ▲ ₴426.42 million (2020)
- Net income: ▲ ₴116.07 million (2020)
- Total assets: ▲ ₴4.76 billion (2020)
- Total equity: ▲ ₴202.09 million (2020)
- Owner: Ruslan Shostak, Valerii Kiptyk
- Number of employees: 9,000
- Website: varus.ua

Varus is a Ukrainian chain of supermarkets founded in 2003 by the Cyprus-based company Weygant Enterprises limited. As of October 2022, the chain operated 116 supermarkets in Dnipro, Donetsk, Kirovohrad, Zaporizhzhia, Kyiv, and Odesa oblasts, as well as in Kyiv. In 2021, the company ranked 49th in Forbes magazine’s list of the "100 Largest Private Companies in Ukraine 2021."

== History ==
The first Varus supermarket opened in 2003 in the city of Dnipro.

In 2009, the supermarket chain Brusnychka acquired 22 Varus-Express stores.

In 2011, the owners of Varus acquired a number of Rainford and Tsentr supermarkets in seven cities of central Ukraine and began opening Varus stores in the convenience store format at those locations.

In March 2014, Varus obtained lease rights to premises, equipment, and inventory of the Russian supermarket chain Perekrestok in Ukraine and, within several months, completed a rebranding and reopened the stores under its own brand.

In October 2017, Varus acquired Billa supermarkets in Dnipro and Zaporizhzhia.

By 2019, the number of Varus supermarkets had increased to 76, and in November 2020, the chain reached 100 stores. In December 2019, the delivery service Zakaz.ua launched grocery delivery from Varus supermarkets in Kyiv.

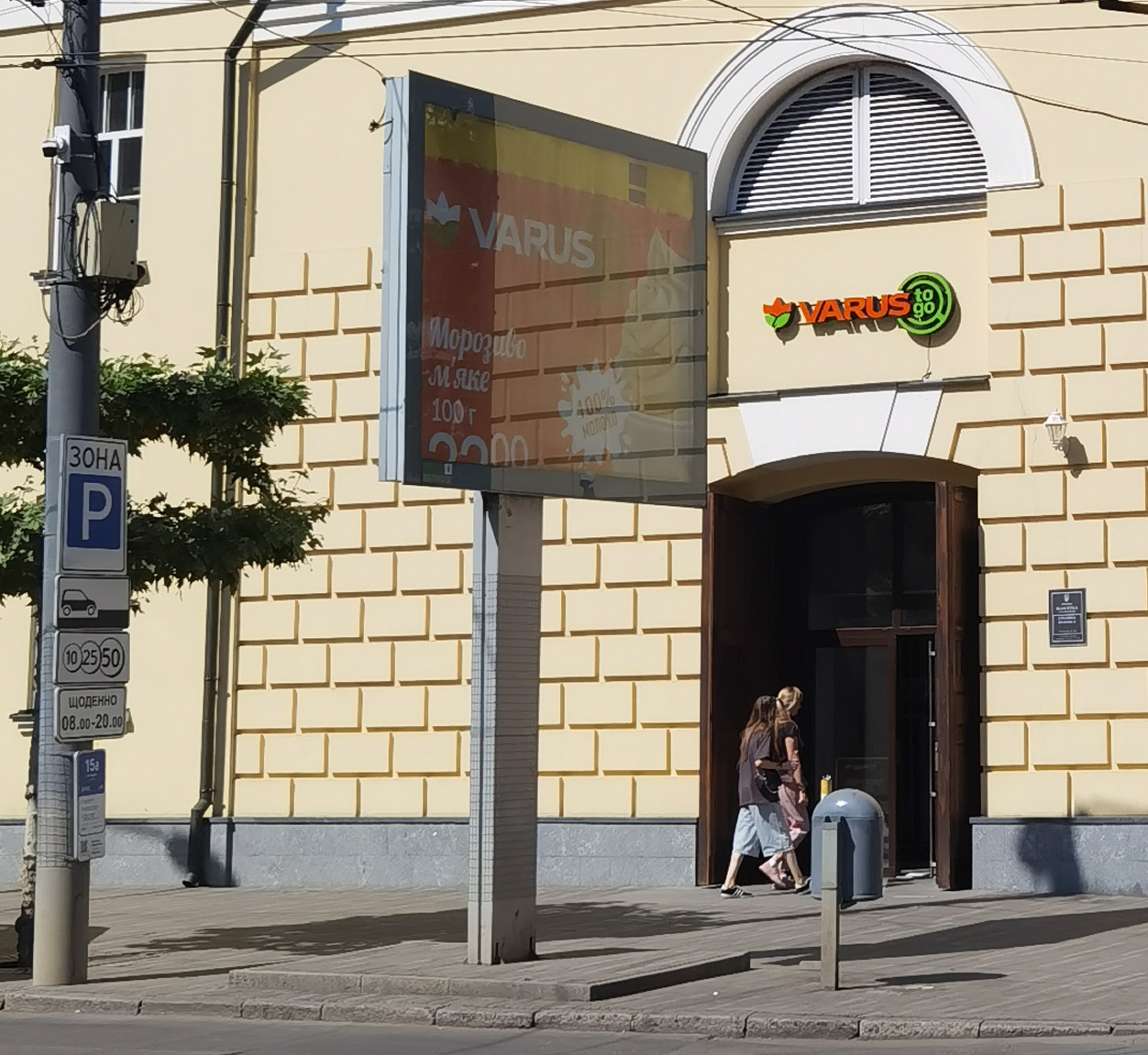
Entrance to a Varus store in Dnipro.

In September 2022, Varus and Binance launched the option to pay for purchases on the chain’s website using cryptocurrency.

According to 2024 results, Varus’s revenue reached UAH 23.92 billion, representing a 14.36% increase compared to 2023. Net profit amounted to UAH 30.07 million. During the year, Varus opened nine new supermarkets with a total sales area of 6,264 m², investing approximately US $7.5 million. The company also invested an additional US $2.5 million in the modernization and reconstruction of existing stores and allocated US $1 million for the purchase of generators to ensure uninterrupted operations.

=== Russian invasion of Ukraine ===
From 24 February 2022, as a result of the Russian invasion of Ukraine, the Varus network contracted by 15% due to the closure of supermarkets in Donetsk Oblast and Zaporizhzhia Oblast. Of the 116 supermarkets operating as of September 2022, only 98 remained open.

During the advance on Kyiv, shelling destroyed the company’s frozen goods warehouse in Brovary. In Dnipro, a missile strike destroyed a Varus equipment warehouse with a total area of 7,000 m².

Company representatives stated that Varus stores would continue operating in occupied Kherson as long as cash collection could be conducted in non-occupied territory or until prohibited by Ukrainian authorities.

Preliminary losses from the Russian invasion were estimated at “hundreds of millions” of hryvnias by Varus co-owner Ruslan Shostak.

In March 2025, Varus legally documented losses caused by the shelling of the Aurora shopping center in Zaporizhzhia in May 2022, where a Varus supermarket was located, as well as losses resulting from the suspension of operations in temporarily occupied Energodar. The shelling caused losses of US$663,000. Total losses were estimated at over US$1.3 million. These assessments were conducted to support future compensation claims against the Russian Federation through international mechanisms.

As part of the Yedynozbir fundraising initiative for anti-drone interceptor UAVs, Varus contributed UAH 1 million in November 2025.
