= Ruslan Shostak Charitable Foundation =

- Благодійна організація "Благодійний фонд «Руслана Шостака»"
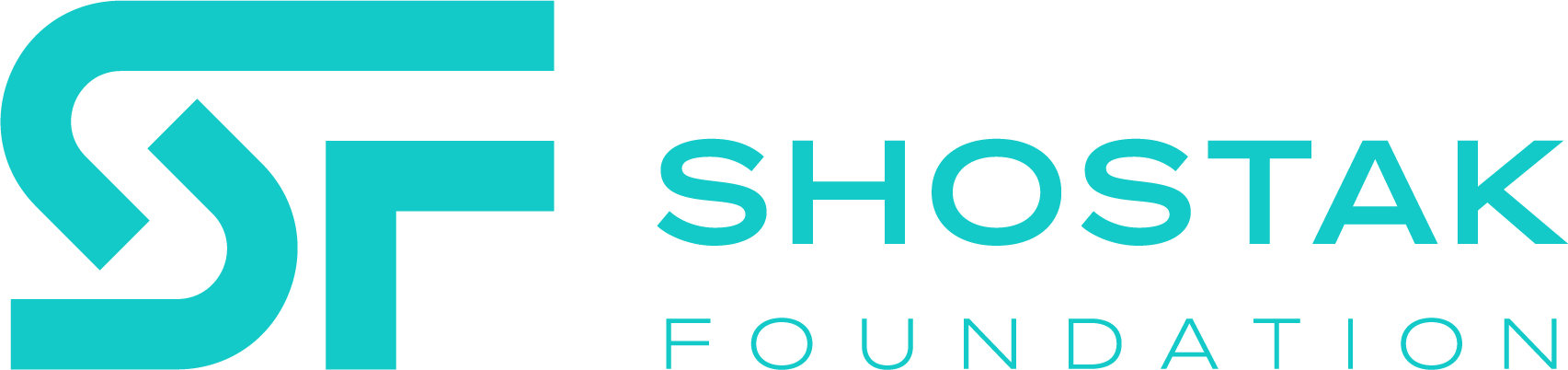
- Founder: Ruslan Shostak
- Founded at: Dnipro, Ukraine
- Type: Charity
- VAT ID no.: 44821459
- Headquarters: Kyiv, Ukraine
- Location: Ukraine
- CEO: Eugenia But
- Website: https://shostakfoundation.org

Ruslan Shostak Charitable Foundation is a Ukrainian charitable organization that specializes in helping the Ukrainian Defense Forces and those affected by the Russian-Ukrainian War. Russian Shostak Charitable Foundation purchase and supply of wheeled vehicles for the needs of Ukraine's defenders, as well as their maintenance — within the framework of the "HeroCar" project.

As stated on the organization's website, its mission is "to save children, preserve their physical and psychological health during the war in Ukraine" and the main task is "to give a shelter and protect orphaned children, and in the future to help them socialize and even find their reliable family."

== History ==
Registered on June 15, 2022. The founder is Ruslan Shostak — Ukrainian businessman and philanthropist, founder and co-owner of the national retail chains EVA and VARUS. Executive director — Eugenia But.

== Projects ==
Taking into account the Russian invasion of Ukraine, the current activities are focused on the safety of orphans and bringing victory closer. This goal is realized through two charitable projects: Childhood without War and HeroCar.

=== HeroCar ===
As part of the HeroCar project, founded by the Ruslan Shostak Charitable Foundation, as of April 3, 2023, the Ukrainian military received 19 pickup trucks and several buses. The foundation has also launched the only national platform for providing the Armed Forces of Ukraine with wheeled vehicles.

The project also takes care of the operational maintenance of the cars — repair and technical inspection.
