= Business France =

French government agency

- Merger of: UBIFRANCE and InvestInFrance
- Type: EPIC; Trade association
- Legal status: Active
- Purpose: Business advocacy
- Headquarters: Paris, France
- Region served: France
- Key people: Pascal Cagni (Chairman); Laurent Saint-Martin (Director General)
- Website: businessfrance.fr/en

Business France is a French statutory organization and industry association, founded in January 2015 through a merger between Unifrance and the French Agency for International Investment (InvestInFrance). Its aim is to promote export-led growth by French businesses, as well as foreign investment in France.

Business France has the status of a public institution under the supervision of the Ministry of Economy and Finance, the Ministry of Foreign Affairs and International Development, and the Ministry of Rural Spatial Planning and Territory Development. It is headquartered on Boulevard Saint-Jacques, in the 14th arrondissement of Paris.

== History ==
Ubifrance was the French agency for export promotion. It succeeded the Centre Français du Commerce Extérieur (French Center for external commerce), or CFCE.

Its headquarters is on Boulevard Saint-Jacques, 14th arrondissement of Paris, but it is also based in the World Trade Center of Grenoble.

UBIFrance has 66 economic missions in 46 countries and more than 1,400 employees in France and abroad responsible for helping French companies in their international development. France's budget bill for 2011 authorized €105,398,000 for the agency.

On 1 January 2015, UBIFRANCE merged with InvestInFrance, and became Business France.

== Impact ==
Business France's work is divided into four main pillars:

- Promoting French exports
- Promoting inward investment into France
- Enabling international internships in French companies abroad, which are also open to candidates from the European Economic Area. This is done via an international internship called VIE, (Volontariat International en Entreprises).
- Promoting the image of France as a business country

Priority is given to small innovative companies. Business France has a cooperation agreement with 13 regional agencies.

== Governance ==
The agency is run by a sixteen member Board of Directors composed of a National Assembly Député, a Senator, three government representatives, three regional council members, five economic experts, and three staff representatives.
