= Style.com =

Luxury e-commerce website

- Website type: Ecommerce
- Available in: English
- Owner: Condé Nast
- Website: style.com
- Commercial: Yes
- Launched: September 2000; 26 years ago
- Current status: Defunct as of June 2017; 9 years ago

Style.com was best known as a website owned by international media company Condé Nast. Under Condé Nast, starting in 2000, Style.com was the online site for fashion magazines Vogue and W. It featured online versions of some of the magazine's content as well as Internet-exclusive material such as event photographs and style-related articles. In September 2016, Style.com was relaunched as a luxury e-commerce website. It was closed and absorbed by online retailer Farfetch.com in June 2017.

== History ==
=== Origins ===
Style.com was originally owned by Express, which posted style tips and had an early e-commerce site, before the domain name was acquired by Condé Nast in the late 1990s. Express gradually transitioned its visitors to expressfashion.com, and Condé Nast put up a 'coming soon' message on the home page in August 2000. Style.com reappeared with its new identity during the fall of 2000, in time for the spring 2001 shows.

=== Magazine content ===
In 2000, Style was relaunched by Condé Nast as the online site for fashion magazines Vogue and W . featuring online versions of some of the magazine's content as well as Internet-exclusive material such as event photographs and style-related articles. It featured material such as fashion news reporting, trend reports, and an extensive catalogue of runway imagery. Vogue and W later launched their own websites and in 2010, Style.com moved to publisher Fairchild Fashion Media. In late 2014, Style.com moved back to its original home, Condé Nast.

In April 2015, the content on Style.com migrated to Vogue Runway, an existing channel on Vogue.com, and Condé Nast announced it would use the URL for a new e-commerce venture launching on 2 September 2016. Style.com and its runway archive were taken offline on 31 August 2015.

=== E-Commerce ===
In September 2016, Style.com was relaunched as a luxury e-commerce website. Style.com offered established and emerging luxury brands, encompassing womenswear, menswear, beauty and grooming. The website combined e-commerce with original and curated content from Condé Nast's titles, including British Vogue and British GQ.

President of Style.com Franck Zayan oversaw the UK-based website, with fashion and retail expert Yasmin Sewell as fashion director, Melissa Dick serving as editorial director, Jane Gorley as creative director and Natalie Varma as head of innovation. Jonathan Newhouse, Robert A Sauerberg Jr, Anna Wintour, Nicholas Coleridge, Charles H Townsend, Pascal Cagni and Franck Zayan sat on the board of directors.

After failing to make an impression on consumers as an e-commerce site Style.com ceased trading in June 2017, just nine months after conception as an online retailer. It was absorbed by Farfetch.com, in a partnership the companies said would create “a seamless luxury shopping journey from world authority fashion inspiration to purchase gratification”. Moving forward Condé Nast plans to monetize their content on other platforms such as Vogue.com, etc. through a partnership with Farfetch where products featured online and in their print publications will be purchasable through Farfetch, with Condé Nast taking a commission. The failure of Style.com as an e-commerce platform was viewed by many in the industry as a costly mistake with Condé Nast having spent around US$100m on the venture.
