= Quirinal Treaty =

2021 bilateral agreement between France and Italy

Treaty between the French Republic and the Italian Republic for a Strengthened Bilateral Cooperation
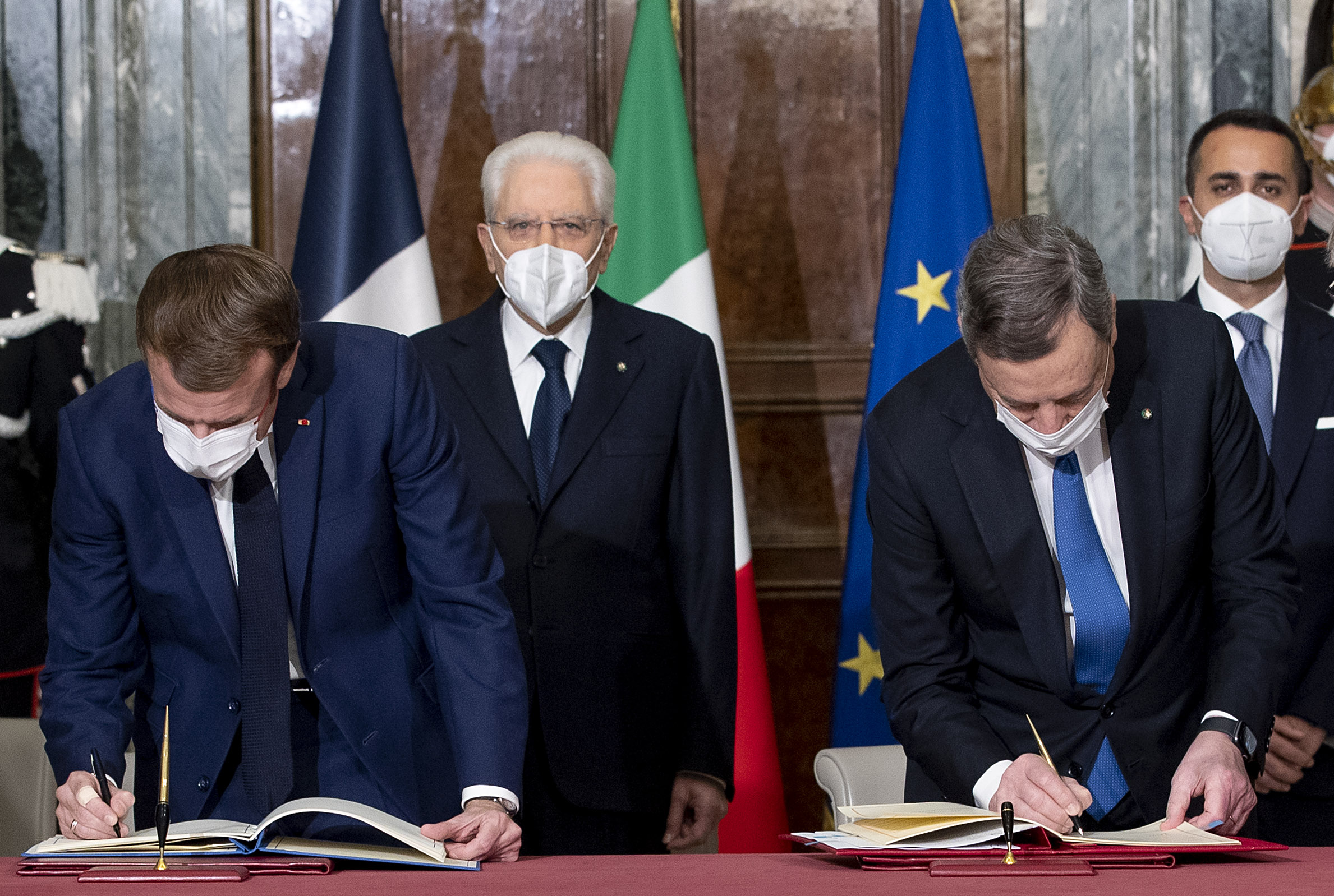
- Emmanuel Macron and Mario Draghi signing the treaty
- Signed: 26 November 2021
- Location: Rome, Italy
- Signatories: (France) Emmanuel Macron; (Italy) Mario Draghi; (France) Jean Castex; (France) Jean-Yves Le Drian
- Parties: France; Italy
- Languages: French; Italian

The Quirinal Treaty (French: Traité du Quirinal, Italian: Trattato del Quirinale), formally the Treaty between the French Republic and the Italian Republic for a Strengthened Bilateral Cooperation, is a bilateral agreement between the Italian Republic and the French Republic, which was signed by Prime Minister Mario Draghi and President Emmanuel Macron at the Quirinal Palace in Rome, on 26 November 2021.

== Content ==
The Treaty, consisting of 13 articles, "will promote the convergence of French and Italian positions, as well as the coordination of the two countries in matters of European and foreign policy, security and defence, migration policy, economy, education, research, culture and cross-border cooperation". According to both governments, the Treaty was the beginning of a new convergence between the two nations in the leadership and the advance of the European Union. Moreover, the Treaty was seen as an attempt of Italy and France to play a key role in the EU after the retirement of the former German chancellor Angela Merkel.

== History ==
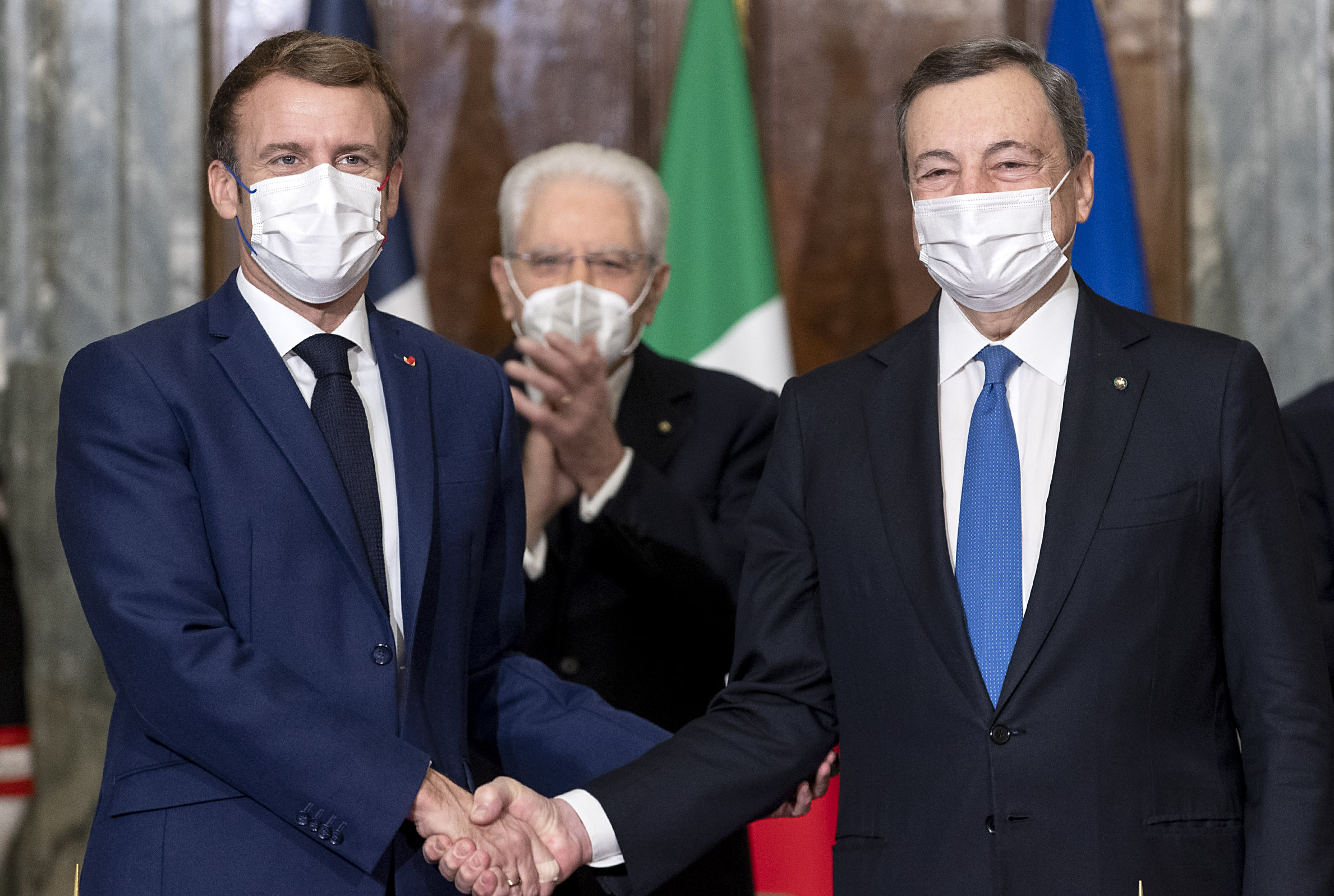
Macron and Draghi at the Quirinal Palace, on 26 November 2021

The project was started by Emmanuel Macron and Paolo Gentiloni in January 2018. However, it was set aside by the first government of Giuseppe Conte, due to the reluctance and political opposition of its members, the right-wing League and the populist Five Star Movement (M5S). When Conte's second cabinet was formed between the M5S and the Democratic Party (PD), talks between Italy and France re-started. At the beginning of 2020 during a bilateral meeting in Naples, Giuseppe Conte and Emmanuel Macron reaffirmed their willingness to sign the draft treaty.

On 13 February 2021, Mario Draghi was appointed new Prime Minister and, on 17 February 2021 he declared that he wanted to better structure the relation between his country and France. Emmanuel Macron shared the same view on 5 July 2021 on the occasion of the visit to the Élysée Palace by the President of the Italian Republic Sergio Mattarella.

On 26 November 2021, Draghi and Macron signed the treaty at the Quirinal Palace. During a press conference at Villa Madama, Macron stated that "Italy and France share much more than borders. History, art, economies and society had been intertwined for a long time. The institutions we have the honor of representing are based on the same republican values, on respect for human and civil rights and on Europeanism." While Draghi said: "Our sovereignty, understood as the ability to achieve the future we want, can only be strengthened through a shared management of common challenges. We want to favor and accelerate the process of European integration."

== See also ==
- France–Italy relations
- Foreign relations of France
- Foreign relations of Italy
