= Mass media in Ukraine =

The mass media in Ukraine refers to mass media outlets based in Ukraine. Television, magazines, and newspapers are all operated by both state-owned and for-profit corporations which depend on advertising, subscription, and other sales-related revenues. The Constitution of Ukraine guarantees freedom of speech. As a country in transition, Ukraine's media system is under transformation.

== Legislative framework ==
The Ukrainian legal framework on media freedom is deemed "among the most progressive in eastern Europe", although implementation has been uneven. The constitution and laws provide for freedom of speech and press. However, the government does not always respect these rights in practice.

The 1996 Constitution of Ukraine and a 1991 law On information provide for freedom of speech and free development of media in Ukraine.

The Constitution of Ukraine lists the Ukrainian language as the official one, and the law compels media outlets to use it. Nevertheless, most media publications in Ukraine are in Russian language. Electronic media (TV and radio), which are government-licensed, are mostly in Ukrainian, while print newspapers, which only require a formal registration, are published in Russian. Online media in Ukraine is not regulated.

The main pieces of Ukrainian Media Legislation are:

- Law on Information since 1992 (2011 - new edition), No. 2657-XII
- Law on Access to public information since 2011, No. 2939-VI
- Law on Personal data protection since 2011, No. 2297-VI
- Law on Printed Media (Press) in Ukraine since 1992, No. 2782-XII
- Law on Reforming of the state and municipal print press since 2015, No. 917-VIII
- Law on Television and Radio since 1993 (2006 - new edition), No. 3759-XII
- Law on Public TV and radio of Ukraine since 2014 (with 2015 major amendments), No. 1227-VII
- Law on the National Television and Broadcasting Council of Ukraine since 1997, No. 538/97-ВР
- Law on Filmmaking since 1998, No. 9/98-ВР
- On State Support of Mass Media and Social Protection of Journalists since 1997, No. 540/97-ВР
- On the Procedure for Covering Activities of Bodies of State Power and Local Self-Government by Mass Media in Ukraine since 1997, No. 539/97-ВР
- Law on Public Morality Security since 2003, No. 1296-IV
- Law on the Ratification of the European Convention on Transfrontier Television since 2008, No. 687-VI
- Law on State Support of Publishing Business in Ukraine since 2003, No. 601-IV

In 2001, Ukraine decriminalised libel, which is considered a civil offence, and the law limits the amount of damages that may be claimed in libel lawsuits. Since 2009, judges have been required to follow ECHR standards on civil libel standards, distinguishing between facts and value judgement, and affording lower levels of protection to public officials. Yet, the use of libel lawsuits by politicians and officials to deter critical reporting has continued. The press can publish critical materials and opinions without penalty, and public officials enjoy fewer legal protections from criticism than other citizens. However, local media observers express concern over high monetary damages that at times were demanded and awarded for alleged libel.

The constitution prohibits arbitrary interference with privacy, family, home, or correspondence, however in the past authorities have been reported as only selectively respecting these prohibitions. (Note: Cases were Ukrainian authorities were accused of violation of privacy are: On 17 August 2012, opposition politician Oleksandr Turchynov alleged that law enforcement officials monitored and tracked opposition activists without legal permission.; On 20 August 2012, Serhiy Vlasenko, a lawyer for former prime minister Yulia Tymoshenko, alleged that authorities had him under surveillance, tapped his telephones, and watched his e-mail account.; While, by law the Security Service of Ukraine (SBU) may not conduct surveillance or searches without a court-issued warrant, citizens have the legal right to examine any dossier concerning them in the possession of the SBU and to recover losses resulting from an investigation, authorities generally do not respect these rights because implementing legislation has not been enacted, and many citizens are not aware of their rights or that authorities have violated their privacy.)

The Law on Protection of Public Morals of 20 November 2003, prohibits the production and circulation of pornography; dissemination of products that propagandise war or spread national and religious intolerance; humiliation or insult to an individual or nation on the grounds of nationality, religion, or ignorance; and the propagation of "drug addition, toxicology, alcoholism, smoking and other bad habits."

Draconian laws were passed in mid January 2014 during the Euromaidan demonstrations by the Yanukovych administration that seriously restricted freedom of expression and freedom of the media. They were repealed on 28 January 2014.

In early March 2014, Crimea removed Ukraine-based TV channels ahead of its Russian annexation referendum. Later that month, the Ukrainian National Council for TV and Radio Broadcasting ordered measures against some Russian TV channels which were accused of broadcasting misleading information about Ukraine.

In February 2015, the law "On protection information television and radio space of Ukraine," banned the showing (on Ukrainian television and in cinemas) of "audiovisual works" that contain "popularization, propaganda, propaganda, any action of law enforcement agencies, armed forces, other military, military or security forces of an invader" was enacted. One year later Russian productions (on Ukrainian television) had decreased by 3 to 4 (times). 15 more Russian TV channels were banned in March 2016.

=== Regulatory authorities ===
The main regulatory authority for the broadcast media is the National Television and Radio Broadcasting Council of Ukraine (NTRBCU), tasked with licensing media outlets and ensure their compliance with the law. Its members are appointed by the President and the Parliament (4 members each)- thought the appointment process has been criticised as politicised.

75% of broadcasts should be in the Ukrainian language, in order for a broadcast media to obtain a license - although this has given rise to protests by broadcasters who buy most of their programming from Russia and the combined CIS area. The regulation is often complied with only formally, by adding Ukrainian subtitles to Russian-language kids programmes or cartoons. The Council has often been in conflict with Russia-based TV channels broadcasting cross-border in Ukraine, as they are deemed in breach of Ukrainian legislation on language, advertisement, and erotic and violent contents. Following the Euromaidan, the new ruling coalition declared no confidence in the leadership of the broadcasting regulator, seen as politicised. New members of the Council were appointed in July 2014 in a more independent fashion.

The State Committee of Ukraine on TV and radio broadcasting is the formal owner of the UA:PBC public broadcasting company. In 2018 this body mainly responsible on pravatisation of the state print press, banning foreign books, which spread hate speech, justifies a Russian aggression etc. State Committee is noted in Constitution, which is a reason why it˙s still present.

The Ombudsman of Ukraine is a body responsible for protection freedom of information and personal data protection.

The Parliament Committee on freedom of speech and information policy is tasked with legislation.

The National Expert Commission of Ukraine on the Protection of Public Morality, established by the government in 2004, was an advising body to examine the media and detect sexual and violent contents. It was dismissed in 2015. The Commission had been accused of limiting media freedom and of trying to control "morals" in the online blogosphere.

== Media outlets ==
Kyiv dominates the media industry and television and radio are largely based there, although Lviv is also a significant national media centre. Most Ukrainian media outlets have private owners. Local governments also own local TV and radio stations. Until 2014 the state controlled a TV channel (First National) and a radio station (National Radio Company of Ukraine), with only marginal market shares. In 2020, the BBC opined that "Funding for the public service network UA:First is meagre and its ratings are low." By the end of 2014, Ukraine hosted 1,563 broadcast licenses, of which 1,229 were held by private stations, 298 by communally-owned stations, and 36 by state broadcasters.

In Ukraine many news outlets are financed by wealthy investors and reflected the political and economic interests of their owners. The decline in advertising revenues has left media outlets even more dependent on support from politicised owners, hence hindering their editorial independence. Paid content disguised as news (known as jeansa, Ukrainian: джинса, romanized: dzhynsa) remains widespread in the Ukrainian media, weakening their and journalists' credibility, especially during electoral campaigns. According to an April 2014 poll by Razumkov Centre, the Ukrainian media was trusted by 61.5 percent of respondents (Western media 40.4 percent, and Russia 12.7 percent).

Media ownership remains opaque, despite a February 2014 bill requiring full disclosure of ownership structures.

- The Inter Media Group is linked to the gas trader Dmytro Firtash and Yanukovych-linked politician Serhiy Lyovochkin.
- StarLightMedia, linked to the billionaire Viktor Pinchuk includes 6 TV stations and several other media and advertising companies.
- 1+1 Media Group is deemed owned by Ihor Kolomoyskyi, who in March 2014 was appointed governor of Dnipropetrovsk oblast.
- Media Group Ukraine is reportedly controlled by Rinat Akhmetov, Ukraine's wealthiest man.
- 5 Kanal TV channel remains owned by the former President of Ukraine, Petro Poroshenko, despite criticism of the conflict of interest.
- UMH group was once controlled by Serhiy Kurchenko.

=== Print media ===
Over 30,000 periodicals are officially registered in Ukraine, though most of these are inactive or have never published. In 2009, there were around 4,000 periodicals — 2,400 newspapers and 1,700 magazines.

In 2010, three quarters of the print market was controlled by six publishing houses. Two of them are foreign owned: Burda-Ukraine (of the German holding Hubert Burda Media, and Edipress-Ukraine of the Swiss company Edipresse. Four are owned by Ukrainians, including Segodnya Multimedia Publishing Group by the System Capital Management holding of billionaire Rinat Akhmetov, and Fakty i Commentarii by billionaire Viktor Pinchuk (the son-in-law of former President Kuchma).

Kyiv dominates the media sector in Ukraine. The Kyiv Post, which is published weekly on Friday, is Ukraine's leading English-language newspaper. National newspapers include Den and Zerkalo Nedeli; and tabloids such as The Ukrainian Week or Focus (Russian) are published there too. The National News Agency of Ukraine, Ukrinform was founded here in 1918.

Sanoma publishes Ukrainian editions of such magazines as Esquire, Harpers Bazaar and National Geographic Magazine. BBC Ukrainian started its broadcasts in 1992. Ukrayinska Pravda was founded by Georgiy Gongadze in April 2000 (the day of the Ukrainian constitutional referendum). Published mainly in Ukrainian with selected articles published in or translated to Russian and English, the newspaper has particular emphasis on the politics of Ukraine.

The most circulated publications are leisure and infotainment magazines. Newspapers, magazines and general audience mass media are usually owned by groups affiliated with political-economic conglomerates (oligarchs), with serious repercussions on the independence and impartiality of the press.

=== Radio broadcasting ===
The first official radio broadcast took place in Kyiv on 1 February 1939. Ukrainians listen to radio programming, such as Radio Ukraine or Radio Liberty, largely commercial, on average just over two-and-a-half hours a day.

Most Ukrainian radio stations are part of larger media holdings. Each big city has a couple of competing big stations. The main ones include:

- Chanson, Sharmanka, Business Radio, Continent, DJ FM belonging to Business Radio Group
- Nashe Radio, NRJ belonging to Communicorp Group
- Russkoe Radio, KISS FM, HitFM, ROKS belonging to media holding Tavr Media
- RetroFM, Autoradio, EuropePlus, Alla belonging to Ukrainian Media Holding

Most radio stations have a generalist profile and broadcast mainly music and entertainment, with weak news contents, as they rely on advertisement revenues for sustenance. Era FM is the only talk radio station broadcasting (as of 2010).

=== Television broadcasting ===
Television in Ukraine was introduced in 1951 as a part of the State Committee of TV and radio broadcasting of USSR, and remains the favourite medium of Ukrainians. The main TV channels are part of big financial holdings. Editorial policies strictly follow owners' economic and financial interests.

Ukraine has more than 10 main TV channels, with a fragmentation that preserves media pluralism although channels are biased in different ways and directions. Viewers choose a favorite bias or consume multiple channels. The most watched television channels in Ukraine are the commercial ones 1+1, Inter, StarLightMedia Group, which operates six TV channels such as STB, ICTV, New channel. 5 Kanal controlled by Ukrainian President Petro Poroshenko.

- The National Public Broadcasting Company of Ukraine (UA:PBC) operates the UA:Pershyi UA:Krym (Crimea), UA:Culture, UA:Ukrainske radio (Ukrainian radio) and 27 regional channels. Former Kharkiv journalist Zurab Alasaniya, one of the founders of Hromadske, was elected as a Head of Executive board of UA:PBC in April 2017
- Hromadske.TV is an Internet television station in Ukraine that started to operate on 22 November 2013 as an alternative to politically-controlled commercial outlets. It gained prominence during the Euromaidan protests.
- Hromadske Radio is an Internet and terrestrial non-commercial radio station, which operates from 2001 till 2005 and since 2013. It cooperates with public service radio UA:Ukrainske radio and has an own block of broadcasting on 1st channel of Ukrainian radio.
- In August 2014 the 1+1 Media Group launched the English-language channel Ukraine Today. In 2016 Ukraine Today was closed down.

Ukraine's only digital terrestrial operator Zeonbud was declared a monopoly in December 2014. It had been afforded an exclusive 10 year license in a non-transparent way in late 2010. As such, it is subject to reinforced governmental oversight.

The most-viewed channels were the following:

Position	Channel	Group	Share of total viewing (%)
1	1+1	1+1 Media	10.87%
2	Channel Ukraine	Media Group Ukraine	10.80%
3	ICTV	StarLightMedia	10.10%
4	STB	StarLightMedia	7.78%
5	Inter	Inter Media Group	7.35%
6	New channel	StarLightMedia	7.27%
7	TET	1+1 Media	3.01%
8	2+2	1+1 Media	2.99%
9	K1	Inter Media Group	2.86%
10	NTN	1+1 Media	2.69%

The 5 most-viewed channels in IPTV and OTT were the following:

Position	Channel	Group	Share of total viewing (%)
1	1+1	1+1 Media	11,15%
2	STB	StarLightMedia	10,14%
3	Channel Ukraine	Media Group Ukraine	7,99%
4	ICTV	StarLightMedia	7,61%
5	New channel	StarLightMedia	6,50%

=== Cinema ===
Ukraine has had an influence on the history of the cinema. Ukrainian directors Alexander Dovzhenko, often cited as one of the most important early Soviet film makers, as well as being a pioneer of Soviet montage theory, Dovzhenko Film Studios, and Sergei Parajanov, Armenian film director and artist who made significant contributions to Ukrainian, Armenian and Georgian cinema. He invented his own cinematic style, Ukrainian poetic cinema, which was totally out of step with the guiding principles of socialist realism.

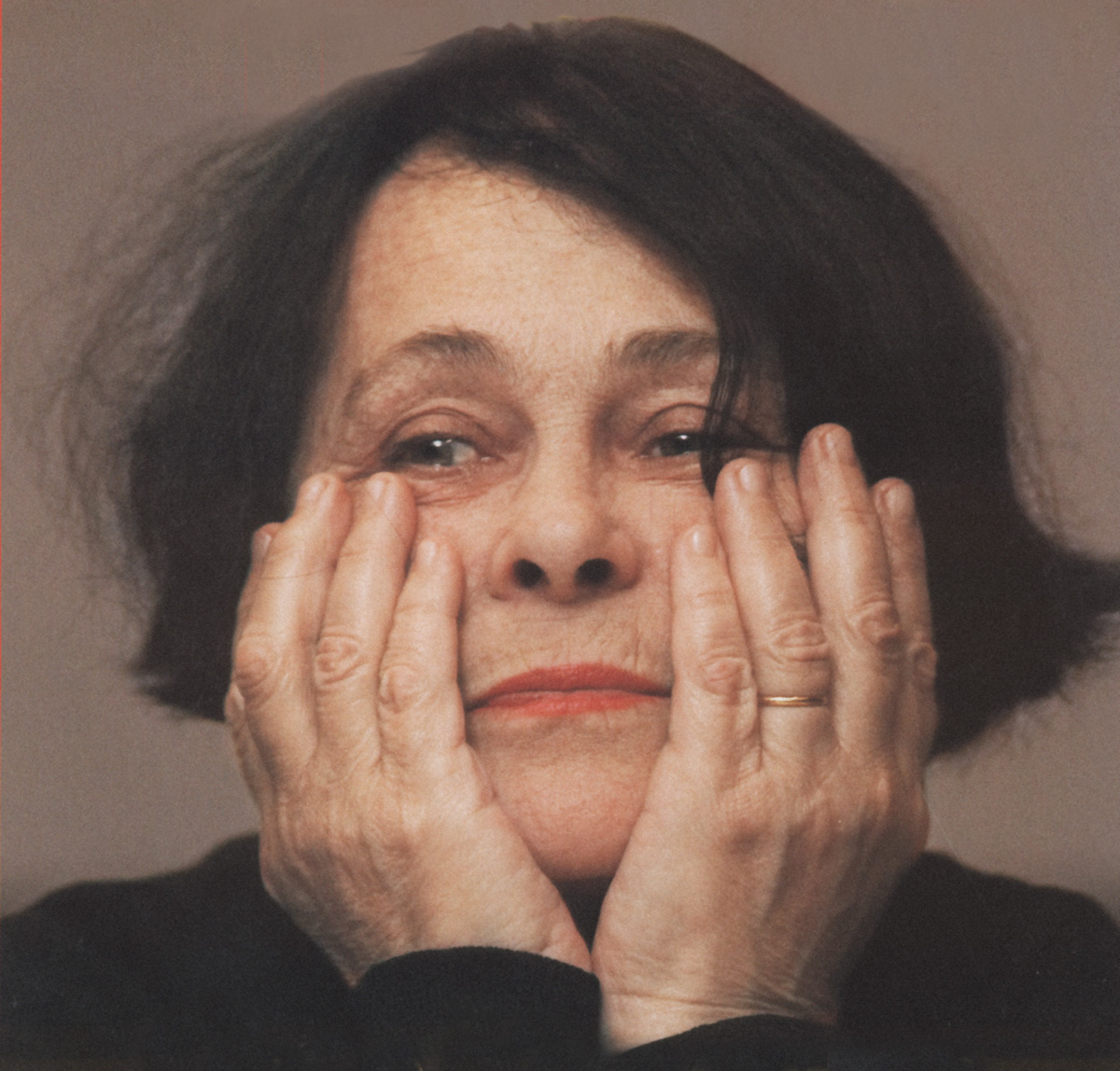
Kira Muratova

Other important directors including Kira Muratova, Larisa Shepitko, Sergei Bondarchuk, Leonid Bykov, Yuri Ilyenko, Leonid Osyka, Ihor Podolchak with his Delirium and Maryna Vroda. Many Ukrainian actors have achieved international fame and critical success, including: Vera Kholodnaya, Bohdan Stupka, Milla Jovovich, Olga Kurylenko, and Mila Kunis.

Despite a history of important and successful productions, the industry has often been characterised by a debate about its identity and the level of Russian and European influence. Ukrainian producers are active in international co-productions and Ukrainian actors, directors and crew feature regularly in Russian (Soviet in past) films. Also successful films had been based on Ukrainian people, stories or events, including Battleship Potemkin, Man with a Movie Camera, and Everything Is Illuminated.

Ukrainian State Film Agency owns National Oleksandr Dovzhenko Film Centre, film copying laboratory and archive, takes part in hosting of the Odesa International Film Festival, and Molodist is the only one FIAPF accredited International Film Festival held in Ukraine; competition program is devoted to student, first short and first full feature films from all over the world. Held annually in October.

In 2009, there were 148 cinemas (273 halls) in Ukraine, with an annual turnover close to $65m dollars. On average, a Ukrainian person goes to the cinema 1.3 times per year. Cinemas income come mainly from ticket sales (55%), snacks and drinks (30%) and advertising (30%). Most cinema theatres screen blockbuster movies.

In 2009 screening movies in Russian language was forbidden by the government, angering cinema owners (as dubbing made movies more expensive and delayed projections) and Russian-speaking viewers.

=== Telecommunications ===
Telecommunication could be considered one of the more modern, diverse and fast-growing sectors in the economy of Ukraine. The telecommunication and related Internet sector rank high in European and global rankings.

The industry also leads in de-monopolization of Ukraine's economy as Ukrtelekom (once the country's sole telephone provider) was successfully privatized, and is now losing its retail market share to independent, foreign-invested private providers.

The entire population of Ukraine now has telephone and/or mobile phone connection; Internet access is universally available in cities and main transport corridors, expanding into smaller settlements. The mobile cellular telephone system's expansion has slowed, largely due to the saturation of the market, which has reached 125 mobile phones per 100 people.

Ukraine's telecommunication development plan emphasizes further improving domestic trunk lines, international connections, and the mobile cellular system.

The Ukrainian mobile system is shared between Kyivstar — 22.17m subscribers (40.1 percent); MTS-Ukraine — 17.7 m subscribers (32.1 percent); Astelit - TM life:) — 11.86m subscribers (21.5 percent); Ukrainian Telesystems and Golden Telecom (TM Beeline) — 2.1m subscribers (3.8 percent); and Telesystems of Ukraine (TM PEOPLEnet) which is the leader among CDMA-operators (383,000 subscribers — 0.7 percent).

=== Internet ===
The Internet in Ukraine is well developed and steadily growing. In April 2012, rapid growth was forecast for at least two more years. As of 2011, Ukraine was ranked 9th in the "Top 10 Internet countries in Europe", with then 33.9% Internet penetration and 15.3 million users; growing to 36.8% in 2012. Internet penetration reached 43% in 2014.

In 2011, online retailing turnover in Ukraine exceeded US$2 billion. For 2012, it was expected to reach US$4 billion. Online payments in the country in 2011 were estimated at US$400 million, 200% growth over 2010.

As of 2011, Ukraine ranked 8th among the world's countries with the fastest Internet access speed, with an average download speed of 1,190 kbit/s.

According to Freedom House, the Internet in Ukraine is "Free", in contrast to Ukraine's news media as a whole which is considered to be only "Partly Free".

Aside from web portals and search engines, the most popular websites As of 2015 VK, YouTube, Wikipedia, Facebook, Livejournal, EX.UA and Odnoklassniki.

In May 2017, president Poroshenko signed a decree blocking access in Ukraine to Russian servers VKontakte, Odnoklassniki, Yandex and Mail.ru, claiming they participate in an information war against Ukraine. Respondents in an online poll on the UNIAN site declared that 66% were "categorically against" the ban of Russian sites and another 11% said it would be easier to "ban the whole internet, like in North Korea".

== Media organisations ==
- State Special Communications Service of Ukraine (Official website)
- National Commission for the State Regulation of Communications and Informatization of Ukraine (Official website)

Centre for Democracy and Rule of Law (CEDEM) (former Media Law Institute (MLI)) - nonprofit think-and-act tank, which has been working in the civil society sector of Ukraine since 2005 channelling its efforts for development of independent media, support of civic platforms and movements, and building a legal state in Ukraine.

The Institute of Mass Information (IMI), established in 1995 by Ukrainian journalists, defends freedom of speech, organises trainings for Ukrainian journalists, and monitors journalists' rights and attempts or pressure inflicted upon them, including trials involving mass media and authorities. Since 2001 the IMI is a partner of the international watchdog organisation Reporters Without Borders.

The Media Reform Centre was founded in 2002 at the School of Journalism at Kyiv-Mohyla Academy. It organises events, conferences and trainings to initiate open discussion concerning media, striving for more transparent media and government.

Detector Media (former Telekritika) is an online platform for media professionals to discuss ethical, legal and other professional issues.

Internews-Ukraine, founded in 1996, sees its mission in the establishment European values through development of successful media in Ukraine - particularly the online media. It organises trainings for journalists, public events and projects to improve news quality, surveys, studies and monitoring.

Regional Press Development Institute (RPDI) founded in 2006, nonprofit organization, whose mission is to promote democratic civil society through the development of professional, sustainable, and pluralistic media in Ukraine.

Human rights platform, founded in 2016 by the former lawyers of RDPI. HRP deals with strategic litigation and legal support for journalists.

=== News agencies ===
The largest news agencies in Ukraine are:

- Ukrinform — the oldest Ukrainian national news agency, state-owned under the Ministry of informational policy.
- Interfax-Ukraine — a former branch of the Russian news agency Interfax, now internet news agency
- Ukrainski Novyny ("Ukrainian news") — owned by U.A. Inter Media Group, Valeriy Khoroshkovsky
- UNIAN — owned by the 1+1 Media Group, linked to the Ukrainian billionaire Ihor Kolomoyskyi
- RBC-Ukraina — a former branch of the Russian news agency RosBusinessConsulting, since 2015 fully Ukrainian-owned news agency
- LigaBusinessInform — part of the Analytical Center LIGA, specialized on business and legal news.
- Obozrevatel — is a Ukrainian Internet publication of socio-political orientation, created in 2001.
- Telegraf UA — Ukrainian online news outlet founded in 2012, covering national and international news, sports, culture, and technology.

=== Trade unions ===
Several trade union of the media sector exist in Ukraine, but their activities are limited.

- The National Journalists' Union of Ukraine is the oldest Ukrainian media union, inheriting Soviet structures and (proforma) mass membership. It claims 13,000 members.
- The Independent Media-Union of Ukraine was founded in 2004 by media activists following the merger of the Kyiv Independent Media-Union with local chapters. It unites journalists and protects their professional, social and labour rights. It is working toward transparent rules for the Ukrainian media market. During the 2004 Orange Revolution the union supported journalists' strikes against censorship; it later focused on owners/journalists' agreements on editorial policy. Since 2006 it is a full member of the International Federation of Journalists.

Organisations based on corporate membership represent the interests of media owners and receive their financial support. They include:

- The Independent Association of TV and Radio-Broadcasters (IAB), established in 2000
- The Television Industry Committee (ITC), representing the interests of Ukraine's television market and gathering all the most popular Ukrainian TV channels and major advertising agencies and prime advertisers.
- The Ukrainian Association of Media Business (former Ukrainian Association of Periodic Press (UAPP), the leading NGO representing periodic press publishers. Founded in 2001, it had 88 members in 2009, including publishers of magazines and newspapers from all over Ukraine.
- The Cable Television Union of Ukraine, a professional association of cable television operators, TV broadcasters and producers, with more than 60 members in 2009 but few activities
- The Ukrainian Internet Association, founded in late 2000 to facilitate the Ukrainian Internet development providing legal consultancy and government relationship. In 2009 it had 52 full and 42 associate members.

== Censorship and media freedom ==
The Constitution of Ukraine and a 1991 law provide for freedom of speech.

According to Washington-based Freedom House the Ukrainian media featured "considerable pluralism and open criticism of the government and powerful figures" prior to 2022. Business magnates controlled and influenced many outlets and some Russian media was banned. Following the Russian invasion, the government expanded its control over media and government-controlled news started to be broadcast around the clock on all channels.

Freedom House reported the status of press freedom in Ukraine in 2015 as improving from Not Free to Partly Free. It justified the change as follows:

due to profound changes in the media environment after the fall of President Viktor Yanukovych's government in February, despite a rise in attacks on journalists during the Euromaidan protests of early 2014 and the subsequent conflict in eastern Ukraine. The level of government hostility and legal pressure faced by journalists decreased, as did political pressure on state-owned outlets. The media also benefited from improvements to the law on access to information and the increased independence of the broadcasting regulator.

Freedom House deemed the Ukrainian legal framework on media freedom "among the most progressive in eastern Europe", although implementation has been uneven. The main concerns of this organization were the handling of pro-Russian propaganda, the concentration of media ownership, and the high risks of violence against journalists, especially in the conflict areas in the east.

Press freedom had significantly improved since the Orange Revolution of 2004. However, in 2010 Freedom House perceived "negative trends in Ukraine".

== Media ownership ==
=== Transparency ===
In October 2016 amendments to media legislation came into force giving broadcasters and program service providers six months time "to disclose detailed information about their ownership structures, including the identities of ultimate beneficiaries". In practice, media ownership in Ukraine has long been non-transparent.

=== Concentration and pluralism ===
==== Legal framework ====
The Public Television and Radio Broadcasting Act was adopted in April 2014 and came into effect in May 2014, providing for the creation of the National Public Broadcasting Company of Ukraine. Starting from May 2015, 31 state-owned companies started a procedure of joining into one - National TV company of Ukraine (NTU). On 19 January 2017 new public service broadcasting company UA:PBC was created on the basis of NTU. On 22 May 2017 The newly elected Board started internal transformation of the company.

In October 2016, "quota for radio - to broadcast Ukrainian songs and programs maintenance in Ukrainian" were introduced. The media market is also subject to competition law, but in practice media monopolies are not regulated and media laws are enforced selectively.

==== Current situation ====
In Ukraine the concentration of market ownership is not conditioned just by profit, but more importantly, by political interests and lobbies. According to Ambeyi Ligabo (UN Special Rapporteur on the promotion and protection of the right to freedom of opinion and expression from 2002 to 2008) these are amongst the most notable deficiencies in the Ukraine media environment.

State-owned media

There are two state-owned media outlets: UA|TV - foreign broadcasting state company, founded by the Ministry of information policy, and TV channel "Rada", founded by the Ukrainian Parliament. As of 2017

Privatization of the print press

In 2006 more than half of newspapers and magazines in Ukraine belonged to the state. In 2011 the state owned more than 100 newspapers and municipalities owned more than 800, together constituting nearly 22 percent of all Ukrainian periodicals.

On 24 December 2015 a new law "On reforming state and municipal print press" was adopted. Under this law, all state-owned and 550 municipal publications (but not military) needed to be either privatized, transformed into newsletters, or closed by the end of 2018.

Historical context

In 2006 the state owned 35 television stations, including UT-1, and three radio stations. As of 2011 the "national state own(ed) about four percent of the TV and radio sector, on top of nearly 815 municipal television and radio companies controlled by local governments".

Also, the state-owned Ukrposhta has a monopoly on press delivery in some regions and constitutes another barrier to the development of private publishers, because of its inefficiency and constant price increases.

Advertising

Only around seven percent of advertising revenue goes to newspapers, while 45 percent goes to broadcast media. Still, even if broadcast media get the largest share, regional TV channels receive little of this, with most money going to national channels. But the fifteen nationwide TV channels still each get a relatively small amount. State-owned media are less expensive than private, because they do not need advertising money to survive.

For all those reasons, Ukrainian media depend heavily on political advertising, with obvious consequences for their bias. In 2009 direct political advertising for the presidential election accounted for as much as 23.5% of all television advertising income, but presidential candidates also widely use hidden advertising, so the real percentage is higher, yet unknown.

Foreign investments and funding

In the late 1990s and early 2000s, Western companies invested in Ukrainian television, but later sold their shares to locals—mainly oligarchs—and left the market. Problems included a "lack of stable, transparent business regulation, the widespread corruption, and the uneasy relationships between the media and politicians". Russian newspapers, TV channels and radio stations are however popular in Ukraine. Russian programs are also popular with Ukrainian media outlets, and they are cheaper than Ukrainian programming.

By 2024, 50% of Ukrainian media relied on the U.S. government as their main source of funds, and another 35% received significant sums from it. On 28 January 2025, Chief Editor of the Kyiv Independent Olga Rudenko wrote that "For years, foreign government grants have been the lifeblood of Ukraine's independent media." Following his inauguration, US President Trump ordered a 90–day freeze on foreign aid through USAID, which included support of Ukraine's media.

Oligarchs

Most of the media is controlled by oligarchs, or – in this case – "media barons", a small number of wealthy businessmen who also have interests in other industries and in politics. They are "external owners", entrepreneurs for whom media outlets are not the primary business and are not an important source of capital. They use TV to accumulate political influence, which they use to support their true main businesses. As media owners, they are not primarily driven by market logic.

This high degree of ownership concentration means a high barrier to entry to the media market. Currently, four financial-political groups control nearly the entire broadcasting sector of the Ukrainian media:

Person	Group	Media outlets
Viktor and Olena Pinchuk	StarLightMedia	ICTV, M1, Novyi Kanal, STB, Fakty i Kommentarii, Ekonomika, etc.
Ihor Kolomoyskyi	1+1 Media Group	1+1, TET (co-owner Ihor Surkis), Kino TV, UNIAN, Glavred (web only; print also until 2010)
Dmytro Firtash (formerly Valeriy Khoroshkovskyi)	Inter Media	Inter, Inter+, Enter, Enter-Film, K1, K2, Megasport, MTV Ukraine (closed in 2013), the web-site Podrobnosti and Ukrajinsky novyny
Rinat Akhmetov	Media Group Ukraine/System Capital Management	Ukraine, TRK Ukrayina, the most popular Ukrainian television channel Segodnya, the most popular newspapers and news website, Salon Dona i Basa

== See also ==
- Human rights in Ukraine
- List of magazines in Ukraine
- List of newspapers
- List of newspapers in Ukrainian SSR
- Open access in Ukraine to scholarly communication
- Ukraine
