= Tetiana Popova =

Ukrainian politician

- Тетяна Валеріївна Попова

Deputy Minister of Information Policy

Personal details
- Born: December 23, 1975 (age 50) Kyiv, Ukraine
- Education: Kyiv National Economic University; Kyiv Institute of Investment Management; Samford University (MBA)

Tetiana Valerievna Popova (Ukrainian: Тетяна Валеріївна Попова; born December 23, 1975) is a Ukrainian politician. She was Deputy Minister of Information Policy of Ukraine from 4 February 2015 to August 2016, having previously served as adviser to the Ukrainian Minister of Defense from December 2014 to October 2015. From 2020 to 2021, she hosted the program Security Code on the Freedom/Dim channel. Since 2021, she has hosted the PopovaTV YouTube channel and, since the beginning of the war, has broadcast daily Chronicles of War. Since 2022, she has also worked as a war correspondent for The Insider

== Early life and education ==
Popova was born in 1975 in Kyiv.

In 1999, she graduated from the Kyiv National Economic University with a degree in Economics and qualification of the Bachelor of Finance and Credit. In 2005, she graduated from the Kyiv Institute of Investment Management, specialising in "Management of organizations". In 2005 she gained Master of Business Administration degree from Samford University, Alabama, via the Kyiv Business School.

== Employment and political activity ==
1992 – began to work at age of 16 in the international advertising agency "Cordier International".

1995–1996 – worked as advertising manager in "Blitz-Inform".

1997–1999 – became the youngest media manager of international "Bates Saatchi & Saatchi".

2000 – at 24 opened a private media agency "Media Expert". From 2004 agency was affiliated to Mediaedge CIA, 2008 - affiliated to Havas Media.

2004 – become a member of the Ukrainian Advertising Coalition.

2007 – MEX agency received the shortlist for the first time in the history of Ukraine at the Cannes Lions International Advertising Festival.

2010 – was honored with the reward from All-Ukrainian Advertising Coalition "Sled v Reclame" ("Footprint in Advertising") for the contribution to the development of Ukrainian advertising market.

From December 2013, Popova took an active part in the revolutionary “Maidan” events, opening a hostel for Euromaidan protesters. Since March 2014, using agency resources, Popova conducted monitoring activities for National TV2 Radio Council and studied the information space of Ukraine to identify separatist calls and false information. Contributed activity aiming to stop broadcasting of Russian TV channels in Ukraine. Joined the Ukrainian Media Crisis Center, which was created by joint efforts of leading Ukrainian experts in communications and public relations on volunteer basis.

During the scandal regarding the disclosure of journalists' data on the site of "Myrotvorets" Center she opposed the site closure [3], but at the same time she was the only member of the Government, who from the beginning openly supported journalists and demanded to delete the personal data of Ukrainian and foreign journalists. Following the statement of the G7 ambassadors, the Heads of the Council of Europe and the EU Delegation with similar allegations of the inadmissibility of the publication of personal data were: Vice-Prime Minister for European Integration, Minister of Information Policy, Prime Minister, SBU chairman and President of Ukraine.

From June 2014 to May 2015 – a member of the Public Council of the National Television and Radio Broadcasting Council.

From 3 December 2014 to October 2015 – Advisor to the Minister of Defense of Ukraine.

From 4 February 2015 to August 2016 – Deputy Minister of Information policy of Ukraine.

From September 2016 – Senior Strategy Communication Expert at NGO "Information Security" and Managing Partner at "Arena Media Expert".

Since 2017, together with NUJU she is monitoring "Index of Physical Attacks on Journalists"

From October 2018 – started the weekly program "Eurointegrators" – new television project on the channel "Oboz.tv", the website Obozrevatel (Ukrainian version) and on the website Kyiv Post (English version). These are live interviews concerning the latest news with foreign politicians, diplomats, heads of international organizations and the most famous Ukrainian eurointegrators:

From December 2018 she was elected Chairman of the Media and Communications Committee in the American Chamber of Commerce in Ukraine.

From 2020 to 2021, she hosted the program Security Code on the Freedom/Dim channel.

From 2021, she has hosted the PopovaTV YouTube channel and, since the beginning of the war, has broadcast daily Chronicles of War.

Since 2022, she has also worked as a war correspondent for The Insider
