= Freedom of the press in Ukraine =

Press freedom 2021 according to Reporters Without Borders: Good situation Satisfactory situation Noticeable problems Difficult situation Very serious situation

Ukraine was in 96th place out of 180 countries listed in the 2020 World Press Freedom Index, having returned to top 100 of this list for the first time since 2009, but dropped down one spot to 97th place in 2021, being characterized as being in a "difficult situation".

Press freedom scores had significantly improved since the Orange Revolution of 2004. However, in 2010 and again in 2011 Freedom House perceived "negative trends in Ukraine" with government-critical opposition media outlets being closed.

According to the Freedom House, The Ukrainian legal framework on media freedom used to be "among the most progressive in eastern Europe", although implementation has been uneven. The Constitution of Ukraine and a 1991 law provide for freedom of speech.

Many Ukrainian journalists found themselves internally displaced due to the Russian annexation of Crimea and the war in Donbas, including Donetsk-based investigative journalist Oleksiy Matsuka, Luhansk blogger Serhiy Ivanov and Donetsk Ostrov independent website editor Serhiy Harmash. The entire staff of Ostrov left the occupied Donbas areas and relocated to Kyiv.

== History ==
2014 Press Freedom Index: Very serious situation; Difficult situation; Noticeable problems; Satisfactory situation; Good situation; Not classified / No data; Ukraine moved its class without noticeable borders to say the least at in the form of editing its place to do so from "noticeable problems" (89th place) in 2009 to "difficult situation" (127th place) in 2014 in the Press Freedom Index by Reporters Without Borders.

The Freedom in the World report by Freedom House rated Ukraine "partly free" from 1992 until 2003, when it was rated "not free". After 2005, it was rated "partly free" again. According to Freedom House internet in Ukraine is "Free" and the press is "Partly Free".

Ukraine's ranking in Reporters Without Borders' (RSF) Press Freedom Index had long been around the 90th spot (89 in 2009, 87 in 2008), falling to 112th in 2002 and even 132nd in 2004. In 2010 it fell to 131st; RSF attributed this decline to "the slow and steady deterioration in press freedom since Viktor Yanukovych's election". Though it risen to 126th by 2013, the RSF alleged Ukraine had "set the worst record for the media since the Orange Revolution in 2004". In the 2017 World Press Freedom Index Ukraine was placed 102nd. As of 2026, amidst the Russo-Ukrainian war, its position has dramatically improved to 55th. The RSF noted that the media landscape in Ukraine was dramatically reshaped by the full-scale invasion, lauding its efficacy in combating disinformation and conveying accurate information. RSF noted that fighting had made Ukraine exceedingly dangerous for journalists, who were "sometimes deliberately targeted by military fire and, more recently, by Russian drones despite displaying their “press” identification".

During an opinion poll by Research & Branding Group in October 2009 49.2% of the respondents stated that Ukraine's level of freedom of speech was sufficient, and 19.6% said the opposite. Another 24.2% said that there was too much of freedom of speech in Ukraine. According to the data, 62% of respondents in western Ukraine considered the level of freedom of speech sufficient, and in the central and southeastern regions the figures were 44% and 47%, respectively.

In a late 2010 poll also conducted by the Research & Branding Group 56% of all Ukrainians trusted the media and 38.5% didn't.

=== Kuchma presidencies (1994–2004) ===
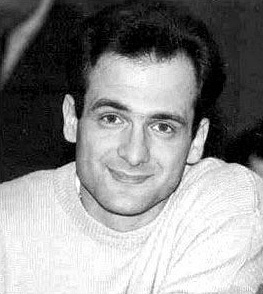
Georgiy Gongadze, Ukrainian journalist, founder of the popular Internet newspaper Ukrayinska Pravda, who was kidnapped and murdered in 2000.

After the (only) term of office of the first Ukrainian President Leonid Kravchuk ended in 1994, the freedom of the press worsened. During the presidency of Leonid Kuchma (1994–2004) several news-outlets critical to him were forcefully closed. In 1999 the Committee to Protect Journalists placed Kuchma on the list of worst enemies of the press. In that year the Ukrainian Government partially limited freedom of the press through tax inspections (Mykola Azarov, who later became Prime Minister of Ukraine, headed the tax authority during Kuchma's presidency), libel cases, subsidization, and intimidation of journalists; this caused many journalists to practice self-censorship. In 2003 and 2004 authorities interfered with the media by issuing written and oral instructions about what events to cover. Toward the very end of the 2004 Ukrainian presidential election campaign in November 2004, many media outlets began to ignore government direction and covered events in a more objective, professional manner.

=== Orange revolution and Yushchenko presidency (2004–2010) ===
Since the Orange Revolution (of 2004) Ukrainian became more pluralistic and independent. For instance, attempts by authorities to limit freedom of the press through tax inspections have ceased. Since then the Ukrainian press was considered to be among the freest of all post-Soviet states (only the Baltic states are considered "free").

After the 2005 Orange Revolution, Ukrainian television became more free. In February 2009 the National Council for Television and Radio Broadcasting claimed that "political pressure on mass media increased in recent times through amending laws and other normative acts to strengthen influence on mass media and regulatory bodies in this sphere".

In 2007, in Ukraine's provinces numerous, anonymous attacks and threats persisted against journalists, who investigated or exposed corruption or other government misdeeds. The US-based Committee to Protect Journalists concluded in 2007 that these attacks, and police reluctance in some cases to pursue the perpetrators, were "helping to foster an atmosphere of impunity against independent journalists."

In Ukraine's provinces numerous, anonymous attacks and threats persisted against journalists, who investigated or exposed corruption or other government misdeeds. The US-based Committee to Protect Journalists concluded in 2007 that these attacks, and police reluctance in some cases to pursue the perpetrators, were "helping to foster an atmosphere of impunity against independent journalists." Media watchdogs have stated attacks and pressure on journalists have increased since the February 2010 election of Viktor Yanukovych as President.

In December 2009, and during the 2010 Ukrainian presidential election, campaign incumbent Prime Minister of Ukraine and presidential candidate Yulia Tymoshenko complained Ukrainian TV channels are manipulating the consciousness of citizens in favor of financial and oligarchic groups. As of January 2009, Ukrainian Prime Minister, Yulia Tymoshenko refused to appear in Inter TV-programmes "until journalists, management and owners of the TV channel stop destroying the freedom of speech and until they remember the essence of their profession - honesty, objectiveness, and unbiased stand".

=== Yanukovych presidency (2010-2013) ===
Since Viktor Yanukovych was elected President of Ukraine in February 2010 Ukrainian journalists and international journalistic watchdogs (including the European Federation of Journalists and Reporters Without Borders) have complained about a deterioration of press freedom in Ukraine. Yanukovych responded (in May 2010) that he "deeply values press freedom" and that "free, independent media that must ensure society's unimpeded access to information". Anonymous journalists stated early May 2010 that they were voluntarily tailoring their coverage so as not to offend the Yanukovych administration and the Azarov Government. The Azarov Government denies censoring the media, so did the Presidential Administration and President Yanukovych himself. Presidential Administration Deputy Head Hanna Herman stated on 13 May 2010 that the opposition benefited from discussions about the freedom of the press in Ukraine and also suggested that the recent reaction of foreign journalists organizations had been provoked by the opposition. On 12 May 2010, the parliamentary committee for freedom of speech and information called on the General Prosecutor's Office to immediately investigate complaints by journalists of pressure on journalists and censorship. Also in May 2010 the Stop Censorship movement was founded by more than 500 journalist.

A law on strengthening the protection of the ownership of mass media offices, publishing houses, bookshops and distributors, as well as creative unions was passed by the Ukrainian Parliament on 20 May 2010.

Since the February 2010 election of Viktor Yanukovych as President Media watchdogs have stated attacks and pressure on journalists have increased. The International Press Institute addressed an open letter to President Yanukovych on 10 August 2010 urging him to address what the organisation saw as a disturbing deterioration in press freedom over the previous six months in Ukraine. PACE rapporteur Renate Wohlwend noticed on 6 October 2010 that "Some progress had been made in recent years but there had also been some retrograde steps". In January 2011 Freedom House stated it had perceived "negative trends in Ukraine" during 2010; these included: curbs on press freedom, the intimidation of civil society, and greater government influence on the judiciary.

According to the US Department of State in 2009 there were no attempts by central authorities to direct media content, but there were reports of intimidation of journalists by national and local officials. Media at times demonstrated a tendency toward self‑censorship on matters that the government deemed sensitive. Stories in the electronic and printed media (veiled advertisements and positive coverage presented as news) and participation in a television talk show can be bought. Media watchdog groups have express concern over the extremely high monetary damages that were demanded in court cases concerning libel.

In 2013 there were concerns over the corrupting influence of certain political figures, connected to the government of Viktor Yanukovych on Ukrainian media.

=== Euromaidan revolution and Poroshenko presidency (2014-2019) ===
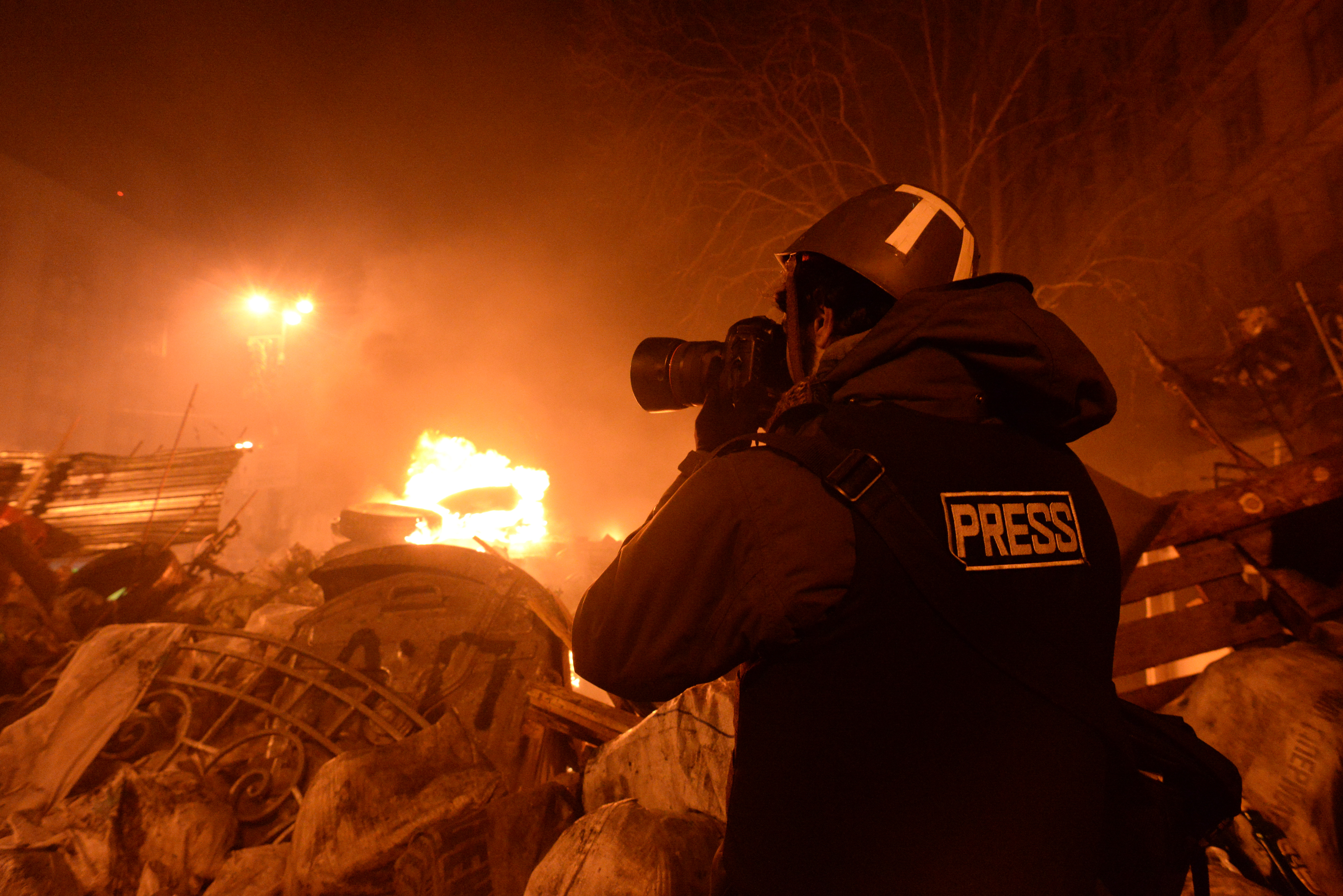
Journalist documenting events at the Independence square. Clashes in Ukraine, Kyiv. Events of 18 February 2014.

A May 2014 report from the OSCE found approximately 300 instances of perceived violent attacks on the media in Ukraine since November 2013. The Ukrainian NGO Institute of Mass Information recorded at least 995 violations of free speech in 2014 - the double than in 2013 (496) and triple than in 2012 (324). Most attacks on journalists happened during the euromaidan period in Kyiv (82 in January, 70 in February 2014). 78 journalists were abducted and illegally detained by various groups in 2014 - a new category of professional risk; 20 such cases happened in Donetsk in April 2014. In 2014 restrictions to press freedom in Ukraine included police impeding access to public buildings, physical attacks on press rooms, and cyberattacks (e.g. against the Glavnoe, Gordon and UNIAN websites); in July 2014 a firebomb was thrown at the TV channel 112 Ukraine.

Political interference in the media sector greatly diminished after the flight of Yanukovych from Ukraine, with media outlets almost immediately starting to openly discuss the events of the previous months, including the moments of violence, which had previously been censored or self-censored through pressures on owners and managers. The 2014 Ukrainian parliamentary election was covered with a wide variety of political orientations in the media. Minor cases of pressures or censorship attempts were reported in 2014 too. In Kirovohrad in December 2014 a regional politician ordered a subordinate to review the Zorya newspaper before its publication.

Censorship issues were debated in 2015 concerning aggressive propaganda from Russian state-owned news outlets to support the Russian annexation of Crimea, encourage separatism in Donbas and discredit the Kyiv government. Creating some concern among Western human rights monitors was that under the impact of war and perceived extreme social polarization the Ukrainian government has been accused of cracking down on pro-separatist points of view. For example, Ukraine also shut down most Russia-based television stations on the grounds that they purvey "propaganda," and barred a growing list of Russian journalists from entering the country. (Note: On 11 September 2014 the Russian-language newspaper Vesti was raided by the Ukrainian Security Service, which seized equipment and temporarily shut off its website, for "violating Ukraine's territorial integrity" brought swift condemnation from the international Committee to Protect Journalists and the OSCE. The Ukrainian Security Service (SBU) broke into the office of a Kyiv-based digital newspaper "Vesti", physically trapping reporters and ultimately shutting down the website. Vesti News's editor-in-chief Igor Guzhva wrote on his Facebook page that the news outlet had been raided by SBU. The SBU reportedly took all servers, kept staffers in a "hot corridor" and shut down the website completely. Guzhva said that the purpose of the raid was "to block our work.". "Journalists are not being let into their office," Guzhva wrote. "Those who were already inside at the moment of the raid are being kept in the building and are not allowed to use cell phones." Guzhva said that this is the second time in just six months that the SBU has tried to "intimidate" its editors. He added that he is unsure of the reason for the raid, but suspects that it might have to do with a story the website recently published on the SBU chief's daughter. Vesti had already been searched for money-laundering in May 2014.)

The Ministry of Information Policy was established on 2 December 2014. The ministry oversees information policy in Ukraine. According to the first Minister of Information, Yuriy Stets, one of the goals of its formation was to counteract "Russian information aggression" amidst pro-Russian unrest across Ukraine, and the ongoing war in the Donbas region. Ukrainian president Petro Poroshenko said that the main function of the ministry is to stop "the spreading of biased information about Ukraine".

On 16 May 2017 president Poroshenko signed a decree banning various Russian internet service providers and news sources, among others, VKontakte, Odnoklassniki, Yandex, Rossiya Segodnya, RBC, VGTRK, but also a number of independent stations such as the RBC, claiming this was done for "security reasons". Tanya Cooper from Human Rights Watch called the decree: "a cynical, politically expedient attack on the right to information affecting millions of Ukrainians, and their personal and professional lives". Reporters Without Borders (RSF) also condemned the ban imposed on Russian social networks.

Since November 2015 Ukrainian authorities, state agencies and local government authorities are forbidden to act as founders (or cofounders) of printed media outlets.

Freedom House reported the status of press freedom in Ukraine in 2015 as improving from Not Free to Partly Free. It justified the change as follows:

due to profound changes in the media environment after the fall of President Viktor Yanukovych's government in February, despite a rise in attacks on journalists during the Euromaidan protests of early 2014 and the subsequent conflict in eastern Ukraine. The level of government hostility and legal pressure faced by journalists decreased, as did political pressure on state-owned outlets. The media also benefited from improvements to the law on access to information and the increased independence of the broadcasting regulator.

In 2015 the main concerns about media freedom in Ukraine concern the handling of pro-Russian propaganda, the concentration of media ownership, and the high risks of violence against journalists, especially in the conflict areas in the east. In September 2015 Freedom House classified the Internet in Ukraine as "partly free" and the press as "partly free". Ukraine was in 102nd place out of 180 countries listed in the 2017 World Press Freedom Index. In 2017 organizations like Reporters Without Borders, Human Rights Watch and Committee to Protect Journalists condemned then Poroshenko's government recent bans on media.

=== Russian invasion and Zelensky presidency (2019-present) ===
On 3 March 2022, the Criminal Code of Ukraine was supplemented by Article 436-2, titled "Justification, recognition as legitimate, denial of the armed aggression of the Russian Federation against Ukraine, glorification of its participants". The article, which has been criticized by the OHCHR and other human rights groups, states punishment by correctional labor up to two years or imprisonment up to eight years for such speech. Gonzalo Lira, an American pro-Russia blogger who died in custody in Ukraine, was among those arrested under this law.

On 30 December 2022, President Volodymyr Zelenskyy signed into law a bill that would expand the power of government to regulate media outlets and journalists in the country, over the objections of journalists and international press freedom groups.

According to a State Department report published in 2023 restrictions were placed on media freedoms enabling "an unprecedented level of control over primetime television news." Some speakers who criticised the government were blacklisted from government-directed news. The outlets and journalists who were considered a threat to the national security and who undermined the country's sovereignty and territorial integrity according to the authorities were blocked, banned or sanctioned.

=== Press freedom scores as perceived by Freedom House ===
The following table shows press freedom scores calculated each year by a foreign non-governmental organisation called Freedom House. The year is the year of issue, and data relate to the previous year.

- Score 0–30 = press were free.
- Score 31–60 = press were partly free.
- Score 61–100 = press were not free.

Year	UK	USA	Estonia	Lithuania	Latvia	Ukraine	Moldova	Georgia	Belarus	Russia	Source
1994	24	12	28	30	29	44	41	73	66	40	
1995	22	12	25	29	29	42	47	70	67	55	
1996	22	14	24	25	21	39	62	68	70	58	
1997	22	14	22	20	21	49	57	55	85	53	
1998	21	12	20	17	21	49	58	56	90	53	
1999	20	13	20	18	21	50	56	57	80	59	
2000	20	13	20	20	24	60	58	47	80	60	
2001	17	15	20	20	24	60	59	53	80	60	
2002	18	16	18	19	19	60	59	53	82	60	
2003	18	17	17	18	18	67	59	54	82	66	
2004	19	13	17	18	17	68	63	54	84	67	
2005	18	17	17	18	17	59	65	56	86	68	
2006	19	16	16	18	19	53	65	56	88	72	
2007	19	16	16	18	19	53	65	57	89	75	
2008	18	17	16	18	22	53	66	60	91	78	
2009	19	18	15	18	23	55	67	60	91	80	
2010	19	18	17	21	26	53	65	59	92	81	
2011	19	17	18	22	26	56	55	55	93	81	
2012	21	18	18	23	27	59	54	52	93	80	
2013	21	18	16	24	28	60	53	49	93	81	
2014	23	21	16	24	27	63	53	47	93	81	
2015	24	22	16	25	28	58	55	48	93	83	
2016	25	21	16	23	28	53	56	49	91	83	
2017	25	23	16	21	26	53	56	50	83	83	

== Attacks and threats against journalists ==
Ukraine was one of the most dangerous places for journalists in the world during the Euromaidan demonstrations and the war in Donbas. A May 2014 report from the OSCE found approximately 300 instances of perceived violent attacks on the media in Ukraine since November 2013. 78 journalists were abducted and illegally detained by various groups in 2014 - a new category of professional risk; 20 such cases happened in Donetsk in April 2014. In July 2014 a firebomb was thrown at the TV channel 112 Ukraine. In September 2016 Inter TV channel - often accused of being pro-Russia - was put to fire during a protest.

Amnesty International has appealed for the release of Ukrainian journalist Ruslan Kotsaba and declared him a prisoner of conscience.

The website Myrotvorets has published personal information about journalists.

=== Timeline of reporters killed in Ukraine ===
- Under former President Leonid Kuchma opposition papers were closed and several journalists died in mysterious circumstances.

Date	Event
April 1995	Volodymyr Ivanov of Slava Sevastopolya, in Sevastopol
May 1996	Ihor Hrushetsky in Cherkasy
13 March 1997	Petro Shevchenko, correspondent for the daily Kyivskiye Vedomosti in Luhansk, Ukraine, is found hanging in an abandoned building in Kyiv. He had co-authored articles about disputes between the mayor of Luhansk and the local branch of the Ukrainian Security Services.
11 August 1997	Borys Derevyanko, editor-in-chief of the Ukrainian newspaper, Vechirnia Odesa, shot twice and killed while on the way to an editorial board meeting at his office.
16 May 1999	Ihor Bondar director of the AMT television station, was shot and killed in an Odesa residential neighbourhood, as he was driving in a car with Boris Vikhrov, the Odesa court's presiding judge. The magistrate was also killed in the attack. This double murder was carried out by men with Kalashnikov-style automatic weapons riding in a car.
16 September 2000	Georgiy Gongadze who co-founded a news website, Ukrainska Pravda, killed in the Tarashcha Raion (district) after being kidnapped.
24 June 2001	Oleh Breus publisher of the regional weekly, XXI Vek, was shot dead by two gunmen outside his home in Luhansk. He was shot in the head and back at point blank range as he was getting out of his car. The motive for the murder remains unknown, although colleagues at XXI Vek said they had received threats in recent months. Breus himself narrowly escaped an assassination attempt in December 2000.
7 July 2001	Ihor Oleksandrov, director of the private TV and radio station TOR in Sloviansk, died of injuries sustained on 3 July, when four unidentified men wielding baseball bats attacked him at his office. Local media suggested that Oleksandrov's death was linked to his investigations into corruption and organised crime. Four former policemen were sentenced to 7–13 years imprisonment for fraud during the criminal case involving Oleksandrov in March 2012.
27 November 2002	Mykhailo Kolomiets, co-founder of Ukrainian News Agency found dead hanging on a tree in Belarus.
14 December 2003	Volodymyr Karachevtsev, 47, deputy editor-in-chief of Kuryer newspaper, was found dead in his home in Melitopol. He was discovered hanging from the handle of his refrigerator. Karachevtsev was also chairman of the regional independent union of journalists and a correspondent for the online publication, Vlasti.net. Police did not rule out the possibility of murder.
3 March 2004	Yuriy Chechyk, director of Radio Yuta in Poltava, died under suspicious circumstances in a car crash. He was on the way to meet with executives of Radio Liberty's Ukrainian Service, which is often critical of the Ukrainian government, to hold talks on rebroadcasting the station's programmes on the more accessible FM band.
August 2010	Vasyl Klymentyev, a Ukrainian investigative journalist, editor-in-chief of the newspaper Novy Stil based in Kharkiv. He went missing in August and is presumed dead. He had been investigating local corruption.
20 February 2014	Ihor Kostenko, a 22-year-old Ukrainian journalist from the newspaper Sportanalytic, also a geography student and contributor to the Ukrainian Wikipedia. He died during Euromaidan.
24 May 2014	Andrea Rocchelli, Italian photojournalist killed in unclear circumstances while covering the Siege of Sloviansk. Ronchelli's Russian interpreter, Andrey Mironov, was also killed. French photographer William Roguelon told Russian television that Rocchelli and Mironov were killed while trying to escape mortar fire, and that he himself was wounded in the incident.
17 June 2014	Igor Kornelyuk, Russian reporter died in hospital of wounds. According to a spokesperson of the Luhansk People's Republic, previously he was caught in a mortar firefight staged by Ukrainian forces and his fate along with Voloshin and other 15 rebels who were with them was not known. Anton Voloshin, sound engineer, killed in same incident. Russian journalist, publicist and politician Valeriya Novodvorskaya later commented on their deaths as follows: "No one tried to kill them on purpose. They weren't shooting at journalists, they were shooting at enemies, at “Colorado beetles”. They were standing among them, they weren't shouting, 'Don't shoot, we're journalists!' <...> Anyone who reports from the front line must be prepared for such an outcome. No one is dancing on their graves. <...> No one wanted to kill them. I'm not going to pretend to shed tears for them. They were very bad people. But that doesn't mean they should have been killed. It's a pity they died.".
29 June 2014	Anatoly Klyan, Russian cameraman for Russia's Channel One was shot in the stomach as the bus he was riding in came under fire by Ukrainian forces near the entrance to a military base in Donetsk, according to Moscow Times. Klyan was in a bus with mothers of soldiers who reportedly wanted to negotiate with the Ukrainian troops. Klyan died shortly afterwards. Ukrainian officials promised to investigate the incident.
November 2014	Aleksandr Kuchinsky, prominent crime reporter, and his wife were murdered.
28 February 2015	Serhiy Nikolayev, photojournalist for Segodnya in Kyiv, Ukraine, killed by shelling crossfire.
April 2015	Olga Moroz, editor of the Neteshinsky Vestnik
16 April 2015	Oles Buzina, journalist and writer.
20 July 2016	Pavel Sheremet Belarusian journalist, who was a critic of Russian censorship, killed by a car bomb.
13 March 2022	Brent Renaud, an American journalist, was killed in Ukraine. He was shot by Russian soldiers.
15 March 2022	Pierre Zakrzewski had been travelling in a vehicle near Kyiv; he was killed by Russian soldiers.

== Missing reporters ==
- Sergei Dolgov, a newspaper editor from Mariupol, went missing in June 2014 during the war in Donbas and is presumed dead by some mostly pro-Russian sources.

== Banned journalists, media, websites ==
The Ukrainian government and President Petro Poroshenko have banned journalists, media and websites. In May 2017 Ukraine banned 19 Russian news sites and 13 journalists, those being "most official Russian news outlets and others sympathetic to Moscow, but also a number of independent stations such as the RBC." The decision was condemned by Reporters Without Borders, Human Rights Watch and Committee to Protect Journalists. The most well known included:

Journalists
- Aleksey Yefimov, of Russia's Channel One
- Dmitry Kiselyov, of the Russian broadcaster RT
- Aleksei Pimanov, of the Russian broadcaster Zvezda TV
- Aleksandr Potapov, of Russia's Izvestiya newspaper
- Vladislav Fronin, of the Russian newspaper Rossiiskaya Gazeta
- Aleksei Sharavskiy, of the Vzglyad.ru media company
- Valery Fadeyev, the editor of the Russian magazine Ekspert
- Maksim Beryozin, a correspondent for the Russian broadcaster NTV
- Olena Berezovskaya, a journalist for state-sponsored disinformation website Ukraina.ru and RT
- Magdalena Tasheva, a Bulgarian politician and journalist
- David Berezicki, blogger
- Dawid Hudziec, Polish blogger, politically nationalist, banned for working in occupied Donetsk
- Vladimir Bukarskiy, blogger
Media
- RIA Novosti
- Channel One
- VGTRK
- Zvezda
- TNT
- Ren TV
- TV-Center
- NTV-Plus
- RT
- RBC
Websites
- Odnoklassniki
- VK
- Yandex
- Mail.Ru

=== Literature ===
The Government of Ukraine started banning books in 2016 that a special committee (State Committee for State TV and Radio Broadcasting's licensing and distribution-control department) had determined to contain anti-Ukrainian content.

In January 2018, the Russian version of British historian Antony Beevor's Stalingrad was added to this list. The head of the committee, Serhiy Oliyinyk, told Radio Free Europe that one particular reason was that Beevor had included information about Ukrainian militia killing 90 Jewish children on orders of the SS "to save the feelings of the Sonderkommando." He claimed this had never been confirmed at post-war trials and was taken from Soviet sources. Beevor strongly criticized the ban and said the source was actually German resistance fighter Helmuth Groscurth. "It's utterly outrageous. They have no reason for doing it. It's quite clear both in the Russian edition and English edition what the source was and where it came from – this rather brave and religious officer [Groscurth] who protested strongly, despite threats he would be reported to Himmler ... about this massacre of the children. There's no way the Soviets would even have known about it." It was also strongly criticized by the Ukraine-based Human Rights in Ukraine.

== Internet censorship and surveillance ==
In December 2010 the OpenNet Initiative found little or no evidence of Internet filtering in all four areas (political, social, conflict/security, and Internet tools) for which they test.

In its Freedom on the Net report covering the period May 2012 through April 2013, Freedom House found the Internet in Ukraine to be "largely unhindered" and rated the Internet in Ukraine as "Free" with an overall score of 28 on a scale from 0 (most free) to 100 (least free). The report said that "there is no practice of institutionalized blocking or filtering, or a regulatory framework for censorship of content online", but "there have been attempts at creating legislation which could censor or limit content" and would "present indirect threats to freedom of information online."

As of 2012, access to Internet content in Ukraine was largely unfettered. Ukraine possessed relatively liberal legislation governing the Internet and access to information. While there were no government restrictions on access to the Internet, law enforcement bodies were known to monitor the Internet, at times without appropriate legal authority. There have been occasional agitations of interference by law enforcement agencies with prominent bloggers and online publications.

In 2014 it was reported that the Security Service of Ukraine (SBU) asked the Ukrainian Internet Association (UIA) to block a list of websites accused of "promote war, ethnic hatred, and violent change in the constitutional order or territorial integrity of Ukraine." Such orders should, however, come from courts of law and not security agencies.

On 16 May 2017, President Poroshenko signed a decree requiring providers to block access to a number of Russian websites including four of the most popular websites in Ukraine: VKontakte, Odnoklassniki, Yandex and Mail.Ru. The president claimed they participated in an information war against Ukraine.

== Situation in the Russian-annexed Crimea ==
The media environment in Crimea was completely transformed by the March 2014 Russian annexation of the peninsula, after the ejection of Viktor Yanukovych from power in Ukraine following the euromaidan protests. Russian authorities engineered an annexation referendum to Russia, and restrictive Russian media laws started to be enacted in the Black Sea peninsula too. Media conditions in Crimea in 2014 were worse than in Russia itself, due to the effort of Russia-imposed authorities to rein in a previously relatively pluralistic media landscape. Media outlets were shut down, broadcasts of Ukrainian channels were suspended, and journalists fled the region due to fears of harassment, violence, and arrests. The situation of press freedom in Crimea in 2014 was identified by Freedom House as the worst in the European continent.

Russian outlets, particularly state-owned ones, enjoy a dominant position in post-annexation Crimea. The distribution of Ukrainian print media has been obstructed by Russian officials, and even the Ukrainian Postal Agency had to stop deliveries in the peninsula. Widespread and irregular expropriations by Russian authorities have also affected the Crimean media landscape

Free access to the internet in Crimea was threatened by Russian authorities. Rostelecom laid a cable under the Kerch strait and provided online services in the peninsula starting from July 2014. Since August 2014, mobile phone services by Ukrainian carriers were disrupted and replaced by Russian companies.

=== Legal framework ===
After the annexation, Russian authorities passed a local constitution on the Russian model and started imposing Russian legislation. Despite guarantees for freedom of speech and freedom of the press in the Russian legislation, politicised judiciary and restrictive laws devoid them of actual contents, leaving broad discretion to federal regulators in media registration and licensing.

All media in Crimea, including online ones, were afforded until January 2015 to register with the Russian federal media regulator Rozkomnadzor and get a license. Officials warned editors that registration would be denied to media that spread "extremist" contents. A December 2013 Russian law against separatism (carrying sanctions of up to 5 years in prison) was used to repress criticism of the annexation and calls for a return of the territory to Ukraine.

NGOs, journalists' associations and citizen groups in Crimea became subject to restrictive Russian laws, including measures limiting foreign funding. Russian authorities failed to protect journalists, activists and citizens from abuses by paramilitaries and security forces. Cases of unlawful detentions and physical assaults were reported throughout 2014 in Crimea.

=== Attacks and threats against journalists ===
Since the annexation, Russian authorities threatened and harassed pro-Ukrainian or simply independent media in Crimea. Media professionals - including foreign ones - have been obstructed, detained, questioned, and have had their equipment seized or destroyed. "Self-defence" paramilitary units have enjoyed impunity for their punitive actions against non-aligned journalists.

- In June 2014 paramilitaries stopped Sergey Mokrushin and Vladen Melnikov (of the Centre for Investigative Journalism) on the streets of Simferopol for singing an anti-Putin song. The two were detained and badly beaten, then passed to the police, who released them.
- Ruslan Yugosh, among the founders of the Sobytiya Kryma (Crimean Events) news website, was summoned by the police in June 2014. In his absence from Crimea, the police interrogated his 73-years-old mother, threatening her with repercussions related to Yugosh' work.

Several human rights and civic activists chose to relocate to mainland Ukraine to escape restrictions, intimidation and harassment, providing information to the Crimean public via the internet.

- The independent TV and radio station Chornomorska moved to the mainland after being forced off-air in March 2014 and having its equipment seized under the pretext of failure to pay fees.
- The anti-annexation blogger Yelizaveta Bohutskaya left Crimea in September 2014 after a police raid at her home. She had been questioned for six hours and had had her equipment seized.
- Radio Free Europe/Radio Liberty created a Crimean news service in Russian, Ukrainian and Tatar languages.

=== Repression of Crimean Tatar media ===
Crimean Tatar media were particularly targeted by Russian repression. ATR, Avdet and the QHA news agency remained among the last independent media operating in Crimea by the end of 2014.

- In June 2014 Shevket Kaybullayev, editor of the Avdet newspaper, was questioned and warned by the prosecutor over "extremist contents" due to the paper's coverage of an opposition activities and the use of the term "occupation". In September 2014 the premises of the Avdet newspaper were raided and searched by unidentified security forces, without a warrant. The newspaper was closed down and its bank accounts seized. Kaybullayev was officially warned that he would be prosecuted and risked up to 5 years in jail if Avdet had continued reporting on calls for a boycott of the 2014 Crimean legislative election.
- The Crimean Tatar TV channel ATR received a warning in May 2015 after covering a Tatar protest. It was subject to an inspection in September 2014 by the Interior Ministry, as suspect of inciting "extremism" and "distrust towards the authorities". KGB agents regularly called the station and applied pressures, threatening it with closure.

== Situation in the occupied regions of Donetsk and Luhansk ==
Seven journalists and media workers were killed in Ukraine in 2014. One of them, Vyacheslav Veremiy of Vesti, was shot in Kyiv in February 2014. The others died in the conflict areas in the east. (According to the Prosecutor General of Ukraine's Office, Veremiy's murderer was Jalal Aliyev. Who, according to unofficial information, was killed in Horlivka in July 2015 fighting for the Donetsk People's Republic.)

In Donetsk and Luhansk, Russian-backed separatists seized control of broadcasting infrastructure, replacing Ukrainian channels with Russian pro-Kremlin channels in both on-air and cable transmissions.

In July 2014, pro-Russian separatists in Donetsk tried to deter journalists from covering the downing of the MH17 airliner by threatening them with arbitrary detention and intimidation.

== Transparency of media ownership ==
Transparency of media ownership refers to the public availability of accurate, comprehensive and up-to-date information about media ownership structures. A legal regime guaranteeing transparency of media ownership makes possible for the public as well as for media authorities to find out who effectively owns, controls and influences the media as well as media influence on political parties or state bodies.

The lack of transparency on media ownership has typically been a negative trait of the Ukrainian media system. In 2005 Ukraine committed itself to the Council of Europe to introduce a law for ensuring transparency of media ownership, according to the Resolution 1466 (2005)1 of the Parliamentary Assembly of the Council of Europe.

In 2014, the European Commission's progress report on the implementation of the European Neighbourhood Policy in Ukraine found the lack of transparency as an issue in the country and that proper legislative framework should be adopted. To comply with its international commitment, legislation on transparency of media ownership has been reformed in 2015. On 10 September 2015, President Petro Poroshenko signed the law called "On Amendments to Several Laws of Ukraine on Ensuring the Transparency of Media Ownership and Implementing the Principles of state Policy in the Sphere of Television and Radio Broadcasting". The law entered into force on 1 October 2015.

The new legal system regulating transparency of media ownership, which establishes a detailed system for guaranteeing transparency, has been appraised for its level of innovation by many international organisations and experts but still the effectiveness of its implementation remains to be seen. In general terms, the new regulation obliges broadcasts and program service providers to make public detailed information about their ownership structures and final beneficiaries. These requirements apply to the audiovisual sector (TV and radio), print and information agencies but not to online publications. Also, the amendments prevent businesses and individuals registered offshore from establishing and owning broadcast companies and program service providers in Ukraine. Moreover, the new law sets forth new financial disclosure rules for owners.

Specifically, the new law amends article 12 of the existing Law of Ukraine on Television and Radio Broadcasting of 1994, establishing that national and local government authorities, individuals and legal entities which are registered offline, political parties, religious organisations, professional unions, and persons that were convicted by courts and that are still serving their sentences cannot be owners of a TV or radio stations in Ukraine. Furthermore, the Law prohibits to physical or legal persons residing in a country which is recognised as an aggressor or occupier the right to own a television or a radio station in Ukraine. This sentence refers to the Russian Federation which annexed Crimea in 2014. The Law provides a new definition of ownership which is closely connected to the exercise of a decisive influence in the management or business activity of the media outlet directly or through other persons and includes also final beneficiaries. The Law requires that information on the ownership structure and on the individuals owning at least 10% or more of a television or radio broadcasting have to be made public on the company's website and sent to the National Council for Questions of Television and Radio Broadcasting, which is the national media regulator in Ukraine. According to the law, the council can impose fines when information provided are insufficient or incorrect.

According to some experts, one of the main weakness of the new law is that it does not exclude funding from financial sources located in Cyprus (even if it prohibits the transfer of funds from offshore territories), through which ownership of most Ukrainian TV channels is exercised. Among some commentators there are some doubts that the Law will be amended to address this issue, due to the strong lobbying efforts of TV owners. Other doubts have been voiced due to the lack of an effective sanctions system.

In 2016, Reporters Without Borders, together with the Institute of Mass Information (Kyiv), launched the project Media Ownership Monitor Ukraine to promote transparency in media ownership and to map who owns and controls the media in Ukraine, by creating a public available and updated database listing the owners of the main media outlets, and detailing also the interests and the affiliations of owners into companies or political parties.

== Opinions ==
=== Independent experts opinions ===
In 2016, an RWB member Gemma Pörzgen expressed opinion that "Ukrainian television became a battleground for information warfare and conflicts between oligarchs, and journalists became oligarchs' puppets". She also states in her research that Donbas war and russian propaganda have a significant impact on the Ukraine's media landscape that, she says, "lead to government's countermeasures", one of which is broadcasting prohibition for Russian TV channels, TV series and Russian movies.

=== State pressure ===
In October 2024, Ukrainska Pravda journalists stated that they've been "constantly and continuously pressured" by the Office of the President of Ukraine. According to the newspaper's statement, Ukrainian officials "block" their contacts with government's speakers and pressure business to stop cooperative advertising with the newspaper.

== See also ==
- Human rights in Ukraine
- Internet censorship and surveillance in Ukraine
- List of newspapers in Ukraine
- Media of Ukraine
- Telecommunications in Ukraine
- Television in Ukraine
