= Ten Square Games =

Polish mobile game developer

Ten Square Games SA
- Type: Spółka Akcyjna
- Traded as: WSE: TEN
- ISIN: PLTSQGM00016
- Industry: Mobile games
- Founded: 21 October 2011; 14 years ago
- Founder: Maciej Popowicz; Arkadiusz Pernal
- Headquarters: Wrocław, Poland
- Area served: Worldwide
- Key people: Andrzej Ilczuk, CEO
- Products: See § Key games
- Number of employees: 320 (2021)
- Subsidiaries: Gamesture, Rortos
- Website: tensquaregames.com

Ten Square Games (WSE: TEN) is a Polish mobile game developer, with headquarters in Wrocław and additional studios in Warsaw, Berlin, Bucharest and Verona. The company focuses on the production of hobby games in a pay-to-win distribution model. Since 2011, it has released more than 200 games, including Let's Fish, Fishing Clash, Wild Hunt and Hunting Clash.

== History ==
The name refers to a 10-square-metre apartment, where the company was started in 2011. It was founded by Maciej Popowicz and Arkadiusz Pernal who had previously launched the nasza-klasa.pl social networking service.

In 2018, Ten Square Games went public and its shares started trading at the Warsaw Stock Exchange. At the initial public offering, the company's capitalization was PLN 335 million. In June 2020 it rose to over PLN 4 billion which means that, given the USD/PLN exchange rate at that time, the company was worth more than US$1 billion. At the end of 2024, the company's capitalization fell to PLN 1.7 billion (approx. US$ 440 million).

In 2020, the company announced a new strategy which is focused on further organic development of its Wrocław hub, development of new studios in other locations, as well as mergers and acquisitions of other studios or teams, both in Poland and internationally. In March 2022, it was announced Ten Square Games had acquired a 24.8% stake in the Polish studio Gamesture for approximately $3.5 million.

The company currently employs over 320 people. Its games have more than 21 million active players.

In 2020 Ten Square Games saw net revenues of EUR 129 million (US$153 million), which means a growth rate of 140 per cent year-on-year.

In 2021, the company entered the mobile flight simulators market by acquiring RORTOS – an Italian mobile flight simulation game developer.

In April 2023, Andrzej Ilczuk was appointed as CEO replacing Maciej Zużałek.

== Key games ==
The company's first game to gain global prominence was Let's Fish, released in 2012 for desktop and in 2014 for mobile devices. The game allows the players to travel to more than 40 realistic places around the world, such as Rio Negro, Alaska, fjords or Lake Baikal. They try to catch the biggest fish out of numerous species and compete with other players in various tournaments and world championships.

In 2017 the company released Fishing Clash, which has become its best-selling game. It is a combination of a fishing simulator, as well as outdoor and sports game. It allows players to travel to locations where they catch various species of fish and score points to become a 'fish game king'. In 2020, the game generated EUR 126 million (US$149 million) of sales. It was ranked among TOP-40 highest-grossing games on Google Play. It is now the top 3–5. In 2021, Ten Square Games acquired the license to publish Fishing Clash in China.

Also in 2017 the company launched Wild Hunt, which is an action shooter game that allows players to travel to realistic hunting locations across all continents and hunt animals that inhabit those territories.

In 2020 the company launched Hunting Clash, which is a realistic hunting simulator. In 2021, the game entered the TOP-250 grossing games on Google Play in the US.

In 2020 the company's games bookings structure was based on North America (41.3%), Europe (39.3%), Asia (14.1%), and other markets (5.3%). As much as 96% of its sales was generated by the so-called micropayments (in app purchases) attesting itself as a pay to win.
