= Yan Dobronosov =

Ukrainian photojournalist

- Ян Доброносов
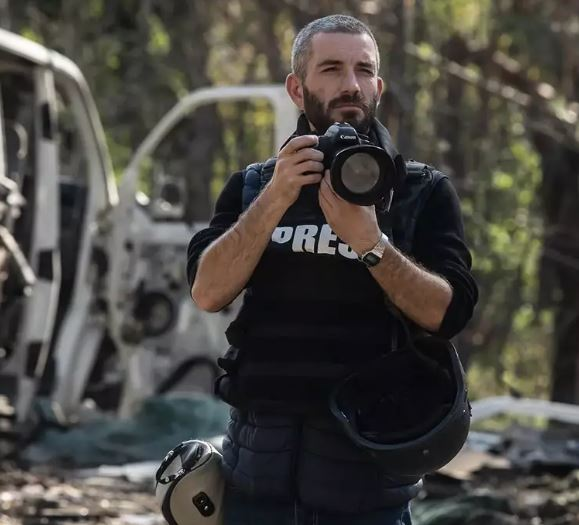
- Born: Yan Stanislavovych Dobronosov; 1986 or 1987
- Education: Donbas State Machine-Building Academy, Mechanical Engineering, 2008.
- Occupation: Photojournalist
- Years active: 2011-present
- Employer: Telegraf UA
- Known for: war photography, political photography
- Notable work: Ukraine Yellow Kitchen Photo (2023)
- Awards: Order of Merit, 3rd class

Yan Stanislavovych Dobronosov (Ukrainian: Ян Доброносов; born 1986 or 1987) is a Ukrainian photojournalist. He is known for his political and war photography.

His 2020 photograph of two female journalists making a hand gesture in the Verkhovna Rada resulted in both of them having their press credentials revoked. The same year, Dobronosov was challenged in parliament by politician Yevheniy Shevchenko, who questioned his motivations.

Dobronosov was struck by the bodyguard of Viktor Medvedchuk during Medvedchuk's 2021 trial, before being prevented from entering the court to perform his work.

His January 15, 2023 Yellow Kitchen Photo was widely shared on social media.

== Early life and education ==
Dobronosov was born in 1986 or 1987. He has a degree in mechanical engineering from the Donbas State Machine-Building Academy _{[UK]}, graduating in 2008.

== Career ==
Dobronosov has been working as photographer since 2011 and as a war photographer in his native country, Ukraine, since 2014. In 2018, he worked in Poland. He has been employed by Ukrainian news outlet Телеграф (English: Telegraph) since 2021 and does occasional work for Reuters. In May 2021, he ended one year of employment with the Bukvy (Букви) media outlet due to his workload.

In 2020, his photograph of journalists Valeria Yehorova and Yulia Mahmuda making an obscene hand gesture in the Ukrainian parliament resulted in the Verkhovna Rada revoking both women's press credentials. Yehorova complained online about Dobronosov focussing on her, rather than politicians and complained that the photograph and the ban constituted harassment.

On September 1, 2020, politician Yevheniy Shevchenko challenged Dobronosov about his photography motivations, complaining that photos were taken secretively in the Ukrainian parliament.

Dobronosov was elbowed in the throat by the bodyguard of Viktor Medvedchuk during Medvedchuk's 2021 trial at the Pechersk District Court. Dobronosov told reporters that he was among various journalists prevented from entering the court to perform their work.

In March 2022, Dobronosov and driver Anton Derevyanko drove into the village of Marivka, in Maryevka, having heard that it had been liberated from Russian forces. When they arrived, they realised that Russian armed forces still held the village, before making a rapid escape. In October 2022, Dobronosov was in Kyiv when Russian rockets landed. He told the Union of Journalists of Ukraine that he believed that the attack was a Russian response to Ukraine's attack on the Crimean Bridge.

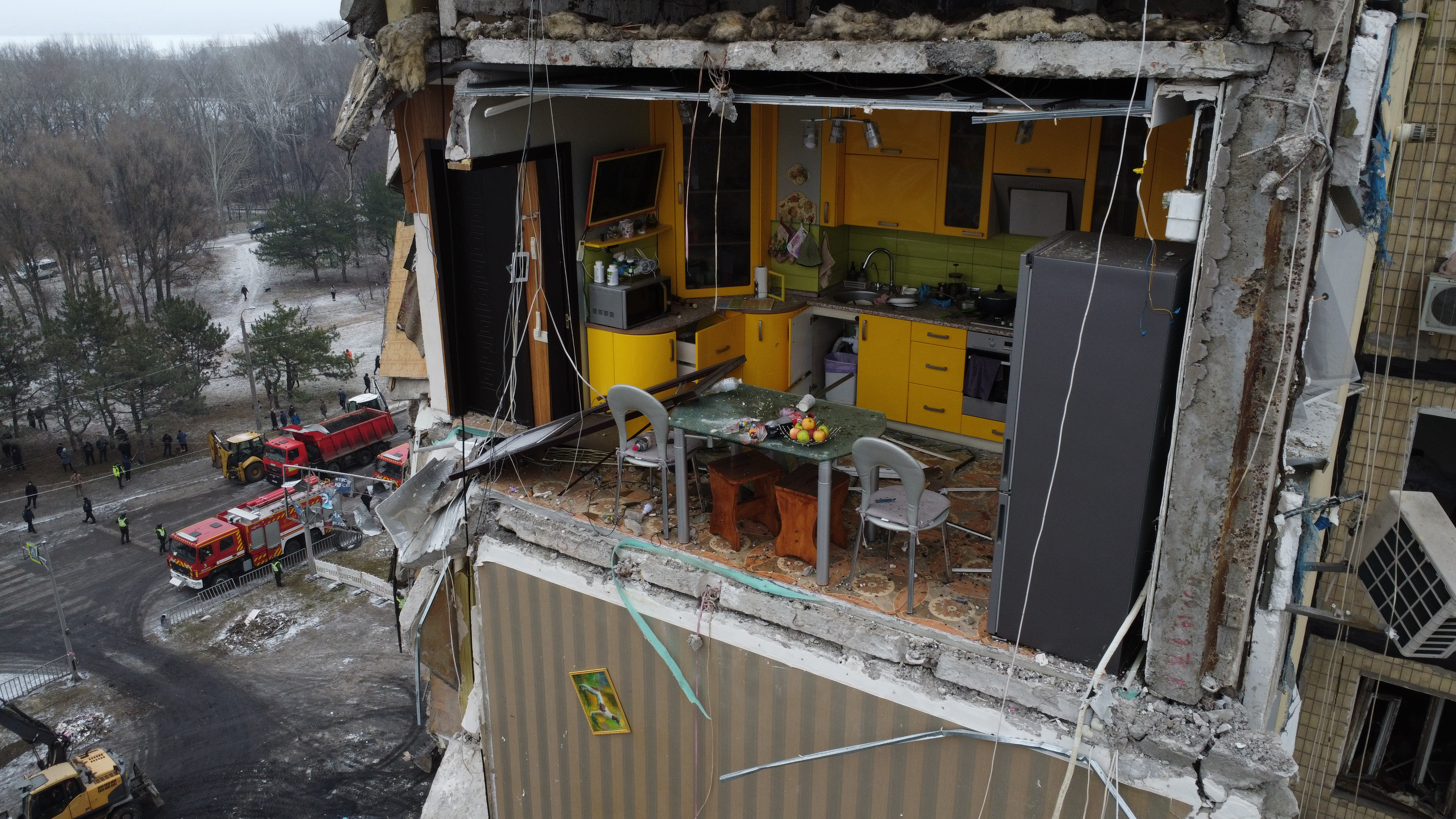
Dobronosov's Yellow Kitchen photo

On January 15, 2023, Dobronosov went to Dnipro to photograph the aftermath of the 2022–2023 Dnipro missile strikes. His drone photo of the Korenovsky family's yellow painted kitchen, where boxing coach Mykhailo Korenovsky died the day prior, was widely shared on social media, attracting millions of interactions.

On February 22, 2023, Dobronosov was awarded a За честь и славу (English: "For Honour and Glory") (Level 3) medal by Sergey Rud, the head of Ukraine's State Security Administration. The medal is usually only awarded to members of the State Border Guard Service of Ukraine but is occasionally given to citizens.

== Gallery ==
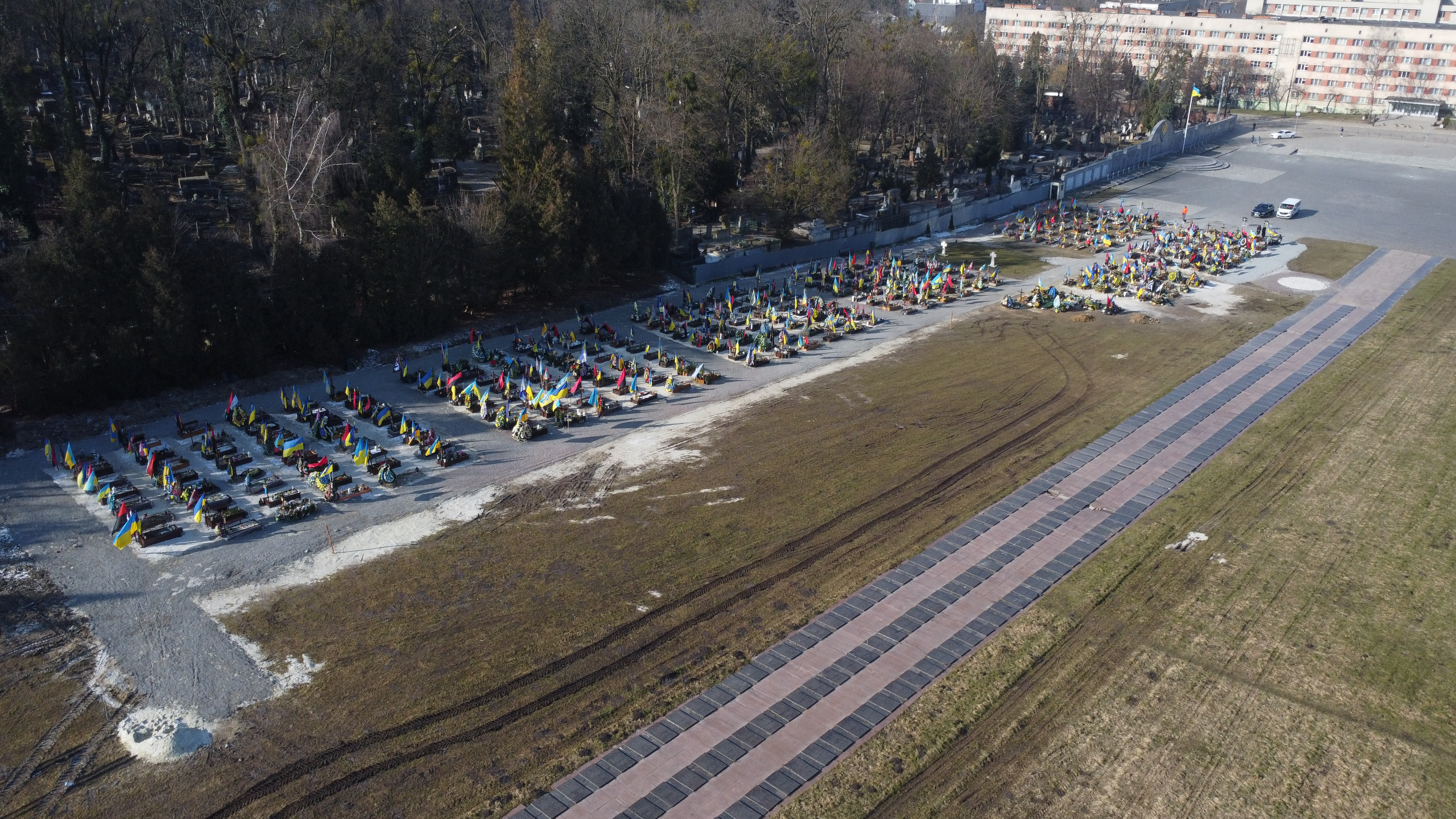
Dobronosov's 2023 photo of the Memorial complex of the Heroes of Ukraine, Lviv [UK]

== Personal life ==
Dobronosov lives in Kyiv. He is the father of one child.

== Awards ==
- Order of Merit, 3rd class (15 November 2025)

== See also ==
- Freedom of the press in Ukraine
- Mass media in Ukraine
