= Olena Kot =

Ukrainian journalist

Olena Vasilivna Kot (born March 13, 1981, in Donetsk, Ukraine) was a Ukrainian Journalist who worked at Ukraina 24.

== Career ==
She began her career in the media industry in 2003. From 2003 to 2004, she worked as a local journalist on Donbas TV Channel and would become a news presenter for Novini and Sport Za Tizhdenv. In 2006, she moved to Ukrainia where she currently remains, she also hosted the news program Sobytiya. Olena owned two dogs named "Bonya" and "Clyde". In 2020, these two dogs attacked two women in the village "Kryukovshchina" in the residential complex "European City". This incident resulted in her conviction, and later she was fined and had her pets confiscated.
