= Forticom =

Company based in Latvia

- Company type: Private
- Industry: Computer software Social networking
- Founder: Vitaly Rubstein
- Headquarters: Latvia
- Website: forticom.net

Forticom is an IT company based in Latvia. It created the One social network. Forticom is owned by Forticom AS. The company sold the One network. Its Latvian domain One.lv was closed in January 2013.

One debuted in 1999 allowed users to send free SMS text messages to mobile phones, at a time when texting was expensive. The site later grew to offer other mobile services, including games, ringtones, and icons. An experimental "Friends" feature was added, which lead the site to develop into a social network.

The company also developed video sharing websites Videogaga.lt and Videogaga.lv..

In 2007, Forticom bought 25% of Russian Odnoklassniki. In June 2008, the company acquired 70% interest in Polish social media site Nasza-klasa.pl for $92 million. Both websites are designed for former classmates. All the Forticom's stocks of Nasza-klasa.pl were sold.

The company is currently developing project called Odnoklassniki.ru.
