= Olivier Védrine =

French political scientist

- Born: 3 April 1969 (age 57); Clermont-Ferrand, Auvergne, France
- Scientific career
- Fields: History, Political science

Olivier Védrine (born 3 April 1969) is a French political scientist.

Olivier Védrine has worked in Ukraine 10 years, he is now working in France.

== Life and works ==
Born in Clermont-Ferrand, Puy-de-Dôme, Olivier Védrine. He studied at the International School of Management where he obtained an International MBA.

- President of the international think-tank “Continental European Union club”.
- Professor Honoris Causa, Kyiv International University.
- Lieutenant Colonel active duty reserve officer under contract by decree published in the Journal Officiel de la République Française.
- Auditor of the Institute for Higher National Defence Studies (IHEDN), France.
- Alumnus of executive seminars organised by the College of Europe at the European Commission in Brussels, Belgium.
- Lecturer on behalf of the European Commission in the experts’ network Team Europe France (2007-2014).
- Chief Editor of the Russian edition of the “Revue Defense Nationale“ (2010-2014). He ended this Russian edition at the beginning of 2014 to protest against the annexation of Crimea.
- Adviser to Henri Malosse when he was the President of the European Economic and Social Committee (2013-2015) for matters related to Ukraine.
- Since 2015, expert member of the Academic Center of the Assembly of European Regions, Strasbourg, France.
- Since 2015 – Member of Expert Board, Center for Army, Conversion and Disarmament Studies (CACDS), Ukraine.
- From July 2015 to July 2016, co-anchor of analytical talk-show UA Tea Time on 'First Ukraine'. international satellite TV Channel launched by National Television Company of Ukraine on 1 September 2012 available in more than 30 countries all over the world, coauthored 120 sessions in English.
- Anchor of Weekly with Olivier Vedrine on UA TV.
- From November 2016 to February 2017, anchor of "Weekly with Olivier VÉDRINE" on UA.TV.
- Since 2016, Chief Editor of Russian Monitor, one of the sites of the Russian opposition. with 500 000 visitors per month, Russian Monitor is the internet media of the Continental European Union Club.
- Organiser of an informal think tank of the Russian Opposition in exile in Kyiv, Ukraine.
- Since January 2018 and the new editorial line by Olivier Védrine, the monthly number of visitors has doubled to 1.000.000.
- Starting January 2018, Olivier Védrine is the anchor of "Western voice with Olivier Vedrine" a geopolitical weekly show on Obozrevatel TV with guests, interviewed on the stage and on Skype belonging to the top experts of Europe and United States, answering questions related to Eastern Europe, Ukraine and Russia.
- Member of the board of New Europeans as Eastern Europe, Russia, CIS expert.
- Associate researcher for the University of Quebec in Montreal (UQAM), Canada.
- Expert member of the National Union of the Political Scientists and member of the Editorial Advisory Board of “Questions of political science”, Russia.
- Visiting lecturer in universities in France, Ukraine, Russia, Germany, Poland, Canada, Taiwan, Italy, Turkey, Azerbaijan, Estonia, Belgium, United Kingdom, Romania, Netherlands, Georgia, and Portugal.
- On February 13, 2018, Olivier Védrine was appointed, "Goodwill Ambassador" on a voluntary basis of the National Museum "Kyiv Art Gallery" former "Kiev National Museum of Russian Art", this is the third collection of Russian art after the museums of Moscow and St. Petersburg.
- Since 2022, Member of board Jean Monnet Association

Olivier Védrine received the Order of Saint Volodymir (Vladimir) from the hand of Patriarch Filaret, Kiev Patriarchate, an order seldom attributed to a foreigner (in attached file the Ukase attributing the Order of Saint Vladimir and the photo of the Order of Saint Vladimir.

== Bibliography ==
- Ideas for a United Europe

== Quotes ==
- "Ukraine needs to get rid of the Soviet legacy"
- "Putin wants to be like a new Stalin but Stalin had no bank accounts abroad, Stalin had an ideology, Putin has no ideology."
- "Ukrainians want to be free, and in Russia they want to be great."
- "The biggest advantage Ukraine enjoys is its strategic position."
- "The future of European democracy will be decided in Ukraine."
- "I believe that a good education is the key to build a strong and prosperous Ukraine."
- "The war in Ukraine is not only about freedom from Russian occupation but also freedom for the European continent."
