= I-Jet Media =

i-Jet Media
- Company type: private
- Founded: 2005
- Headquarters: Silicon Valley, (California, United States); Ekaterinburg, Chelyabinsk, Nizhny Tagil, Ozersk (Russia); Beijing (China)
- Industry: computer games, social games
- Employees: 100+
- Website: web.archive.org/web/20110123080644/http://i-jet.ru/

i-Jet Media is a Russian distribution network and publisher of social games on web portals and social networks. It was founded in 2005 and published its first game, Maffia News, in 2007. The company has foreign offices in Silicon Valley, United States and Beijing, China.

== History ==
In 2005, i-Jet Media was founded as a developer of browser-based games. The company's first game, Maffia New, was developed during the next two years. After the launch, Maffia New used to gain more than 500,000 monthly users on Rambler. In 2007, Maffia New was published on Rambler.ru as well as Time to Enforce, Real Wars and Steel Giants were launched. Alexey Kostarev, CEO and co-founder of i-Jet Media, opened an office in Silicon Valley, United States. After that, the company started preparing to launch social games in Russia.

In 2009, the company launched a cooperative project with Chinese developer Elex: i-Jet Media published Elex's games in Russian social networks — VKontakte, first of all.

In April 2009, i-Jet Media published Happy Harvest on the Russian Internet, and the game succeeded to collect about 10,000,000 unique active users and earn US$20 million during less than one year. Happy Harvest was awarded with the Goggle Trend prize as the best game of 2009. In 2009, i-Jet Media also opened its office in Beijing.

In 2010, i-Jet Media games were the first ones ever published in the Odnoklassniki.ru network. The company started exporting them to European social networks: Estonia, Finland, Germany, and Poland. In May 2010, the company published Farm Frenzy, in cooperation with an international casual game publisher and distributor Alawar Entertainment. In summer 2010, i-Jet Media started to publish games on Russian Facebook.

i-Jet Media also publishes mobile versions of games on social networks of Russia. In July 2010, i-Jet Media and mobile social network Spaces.ru established a game section, which managed to get more than 25,000 visitors during its first day online.

In September 2010, i-Jet Media and Playdom announced that i-Jet Media would publish social games by Playdom in European social networks. They also agreed to combat piracy on the Russian social games market.

As of 2011, i-Jet Media works with 40 game developers and has published 80 social games on 30 social networks, and has several dozen social games with an audience of 70 million users.

== i-Jet Connect ==
On August 15, 2011, during the Social Games Summit at Game Developers Conference Europe, i-Jet Media revealed its new technological platform, i-Jet Connect; the platform is intended to consolidate social game development solutions and features the ability to quickly publish titles to both global and local social networks, manage traffic, and incorporate brand advertisements. i-Jet Media has been conducting a closed beta test of i-Jet Connect since August 15 expected to be finished in November 2011. Meanwhile, social game developers could register for the beta on the company's web site.
