= Sergei Dolgov =

- Born: September 18, 1954; Kospash (today part of Kizel), Molotov Oblast
- Disappeared: June 18, 2014 (aged 59); Mariupol, Ukraine
- Status: Missing for 12 years and 22 days
- Occupations: Journalist and editor
- Employer(s): Azov Region Courier and SSSR (I want to go to the USSR)
- Known for: Journalist abducted and (possibly) murdered
- Spouse: Olga Dolgov

Sergei Dolgov (born 18 September 1954) was a Ukrainian journalist who served as editor for the Vestnik Pryazovya and Khochu v SSSR in Mariupol, Ukraine before he went missing. He was notorious for promoting neo-Sovietism and criticism of the state of Ukraine in contrast to what it was when it was part of the Soviet Union. Many press organizations suspect that his disappearance is in fact a murder.

== Personal ==
Much of Dolgov's personal life is unknown. Dolgov was married to Olga Dolgova who expressed great concern for his safety and believed in September 2014 that her husband was being held at military base A1978 in Zaporizhzhia.

== Career ==
Sergei Dolgov was the chief editor of two Russian-language newspapers Vestnik Pryazovya (Translated: Azov Region Courier) and Khochu v SSSR (Translated: I want to go to the USSR), in Mariupol.

== Disappearance ==
Dolgov was abducted from the Vestnik Pryazovya office on the afternoon of 18 June 2014 by six masked men in civilian dress with automatic weapons. The perpetrators took computers. They beat Dolgov and then took him away with his hands tied. Colleagues of Dolgov think his abduction was linked to his editing of Khochu v SSSR, which mainly published historical articles about the Soviet era and which was considered by some Ukrainian newspapers a "separatist" publication. His whereabouts and the identity and motive of his abductors remained unknown for five days.

Konstatin Dolgov, who is also a leader of the pro-separatist People's Front of Novorossiya movement, added that his namesake had been "tortured" by kidnappers, saying "the enhanced interrogation ended in the death of the journalist." According to employees of Vestnik Priazovya, Dolgov had been missing since mid-June when masked men armed with automatic rifles barged into their editorial offices in the eastern Ukrainian town of Mariupol and abducted Dolgov, tying up his hands with wire. Serhiy Spasitel, the head of the Mariupol regional branch of the Ukrainian Security Service (SBU), said a few days later that Dolgov was alive and well, but that questions about his specific whereabouts should be addressed to Ukraine's Anti-Terror Center — the SBU agency in charge of combating the separatist movement in the country's east. Mariupol Prosecutor Serhiy Reznitsky also denied any knowledge of the supposed abduction, saying police and prosecutors "do not always know what is happening [at the Anti-Terror Center]"

== Context ==
According to a 2014 timeline on The Guardian, at least eleven cases of intimidation to journalists were reported that resulted in detainment, expulsion, bomb threats, injury, attack, job suspension, and murder. Reporters Without Borders stated in 2014 "the anti-Kyiv rebels in eastern Ukraine have been targeting journalists since March. Now the Ukrainian authorities are behaving with growing hostility to journalists working for Russian media".

== Impact ==
OSCE's representative on Freedom of the Media, Dunja Mijatovic, stated that two Ukrainian journalists were abducted in the Donetsk region. An attack on the editorial office of the Pro Gorod newspaper in the city of Torez, Donetsk region, on 26 June 2014 was believed to have been related to the case. Mijatovic's statement, published by the OSCE, states that on 28 June 2014, an editor of the Druzhkovsky Rabochiy newspaper, Boris Yuzhik, was kidnapped in Donetsk just after a few days that Dolgov had gone missing.

== Reactions ==
Concerned about this situation, the Greek MEP Konstantinos Papadakis (Communist Party of Greece, or KKE) issued a statement on 8 December 2014, the request of the European Commission: his wife had complained that Dolgov was kidnapped in a "cleansing operation", held in the city of Mariupol by "nationalist" and "fascist" forces associated with the authorities in Kyiv. However, the government of Ukraine refused to comment. Rumors circulated that the SBU’s head had confirmed that Dolgov was being held in Zaporizhzhia. On 5 March 2015, after three months, European Commission representative Federica Mogherini responded:

Freedom of the media is a key feature of democracy and any journalist must be able to carry out their work free from harassment and intimidation. The kidnapping of Sergei Dolgov (and presumed murder) is a felony and is totally unacceptable. The Ukrainian authorities must thoroughly investigate the case and bring those responsible to justice. The EU fully supports the position of the OSCE Representative on Freedom of the media in regard to this case and will monitor the state of development of research, in close cooperation with the OSCE. The involvement of the authorities in cases of kidnappings of journalists is a serious claim to be proven with evidence.

== See also ==
- Freedom of the press in Ukraine
- List of kidnappings
- List of people who disappeared mysteriously: post-1970
- Russo-Ukrainian War
