= Vasyl Klymentyev =

Ukrainian journalist

- Born: Vasyl Petrovych Klymentyev; October 10, 1943; Bereka, Kharkiv, Ukrainian SSR, Soviet Union
- Disappeared: 11 August 2010 (aged 66); Kharkiv, Ukraine
- Status: Missing for 16 years, 3 months and 2 days
- Employer: Noviy Stil

Vasyl Petrovych Klymentyev (Ukrainian: Василь Петрович Климентьєв, Russian: Василий Петрович Климентьев, 10 October 1943 - disappeared 11 August 2010) was a Ukrainian investigative journalist and the editor-in-chief of the newspaper Noviy Stil based in Kharkiv, Ukraine.

On 11 August 2010, he disappeared under mysterious circumstances and is presumed dead.

== Disappearance ==
Klymentyev was known for his investigations into corruption in the Kharkiv area. He disappeared after leaving his home on the morning of 11 August 2010.

On 15 August 2010, the police opened an investigation on the presumption that it was first-degree murder. On 17 August 2010, Klymentyev's mobile phone was found floating in the Pechenihy Reservoir. Despite several investigations, his fate remains uncertain.

== Aftermath ==
His disappearance has been compared to that of Georgiy Gongadze, an internet journalist murdered in 2000 for investigating corruption. Media watchdogs view this as one of many signs of a deterioration in press freedom since the election of President Viktor Yanukovych in February 2010.

== See also ==
- Freedom of the press in Ukraine
- Georgiy Gongadze (journalist who disappeared in 2000)
- List of people who disappeared mysteriously: post-1970
