= Odnoklassniki =

Social networking service

- Website type: Social Networking
- Available in: 13 languages: Armenian; Azerbaijani; English; Georgian; German; Romanian; Russian; Kazakh; Kyrgyz; Tajik; Turkish; Ukrainian; Uzbek
- Owner: VK
- Creators: Albert Popkov (founder and head)
- Website: ok.ru
- Commercial: yes
- Registration: Required; no payment needed since 31 August 2010
- Launched: 4 March 2006; 20 years ago

Odnoklassniki (Russian: Одноклассники, lit. 'Classmates'), abbreviated as OK or OK.ru, is a social networking service and online video sharing website primarily in Russia and former Soviet Republics. The site was launched on 4 March 2006, by Albert Popkov and is currently owned by VK.

The website currently has more than 200 million registered users and 45 million daily unique visitors. Odnoklassniki also currently had an Alexa Internet traffic ranking of 56 worldwide and 7 for Russia. Odnoklassniki is the second most popular social network in Russia, behind VK (VKontakte) but ahead of Facebook, which is in 3rd place.

== History ==
Odnoklassniki was launched on 26 March 2006, by Albert Popkov, a telecommunications professional residing in London. Having previously been involved in similar projects in other European countries, Popkov initially developed Odnoklassniki as a hobby project from March to November 2006. During this period, it was only mentioned commercially within a friendly advertising agency as an advertising platform.

However, due to a significant increase in userbase, Popkov established a separate legal entity for the service. By July 2007, Odnoklassniki had grown its audience to 3 million users. In November 2009, the British company I-CD accused Popkov of copyright infringement, alleging that he used proprietary information to create a site similar to I-CD's social network Passado. Popkov was previously employed by I-CD but had resigned in November 2005. Popkov denied these allegations, but was eventually dismissed as managing director of Odnoklassniki. In November 2009, after the first day of trial in the Royal Courts of Justice, I-CD dropped all charges against Popkov and Odnoklassniki after they agreed to pay an undisclosed amount as settlement.

In September 2008, Popkov sold a controlling interest in Odnoklassniki to Digital Sky Technologies (DST), the owner of Mail.ru. DST and its subsidiary, Forticom, acquired a 58% stake in the network. Paid registration was introduced in Odnoklassniki in 2008, but this led to a decline in popularity as users began migrating to the main competitor, VKontakte. As a result, Odnoklassniki reverted to a free model and discontinued user registration fees by August 2010.

On 23 January 2009, a service was launched which allows a user to clear their personal page of uninvited guests by removing them from the list of views as well as allowing the blocking access from all users that they are not "friends" with on the service.

In early April 2010 beta testing games became available on the site, developed by i-Jet, and on 24 December 2010, users of Odnoklassniki publicly released a beta version of video chat. Regular updates between 2011 and 2019 saw additional features added, such as the ability to divide friends into groups, a music section where users could upload MP3 files, and detailed customizable user themes. Odnoklassniki reached 40 million users per day in 2013 and in 2022, following the block of Instagram by Roskomnadzor, about 4% of the former Instagram users polled by Zarplata.ru said they had switched to Odnoklassniki.

Additionally, Odnoklassniki introduced advertising formats, launched its messenger called OK Messages, included live broadcasts in communities, and developed a video app called OK Video for Smart TV. The social network also faced challenges, such as being blocked by the Ukrainian government in retaliation for the annexation of Crimea and dealing with technical issues that temporarily affected site availability.

In recent years, Odnoklassniki has continued to add features such as the "recommendations" service, new emoticons beyond the "Class" button, a video feed on the mobile app, and an ad account for small businesses and content creators.

== Service blocking in Ukraine ==
In May 2017, Ukrainian President Petro Poroshenko signed a decree imposing a ban on Mail.ru and its social networks, including VKontakte and Odnoklassniki, as part of its continued sanctions on Russia for its annexation of Crimea and involvement in the War in Donbas. The move was widely criticized as censorship, and Reporters Without Borders condemned the ban, calling it a "disproportionate measure that seriously undermines the Ukrainian people's right to information and freedom of expression." Respondents in an online poll on the UNIAN site declared that 66% were "categorically against" the ban of Russian sites and another 11% said it would be easier to "ban the whole internet, like in North Korea".

According to the Ukrainian Internet Association, the share of Ukrainian Internet users who visit Odnoklassniki daily had fallen from 35% in September 2016 to 10% in September 2019.

== Paid registration and services ==
In October 2008, Odnoklassniki began requiring new users to pay a fee via SMS to activate their accounts and unlock many core features, including creating posts, uploading or rating photos, leaving comments in forums, or visiting other users' pages. Odnoklassniki claimed the measure was necessary to maintain order in the network and protect users from spam. The site also offered a number of other, separate paid services: deleting ratings of their photos, disabling the user online status, and providing a wide range of emojis.

By August 2010, Odnoklassniki canceled paid registration, claiming that new effective ways to combat spammers had been developed.

In February 2016, the social network, together with its partner bank VTB 24, introduced the ability to make money transfers between users of the network. Transfers are made between MasterCard, Maestro, and Visa payment cards issued by Russian banks and linked to user profiles.

== Awards and recognition ==
- 2006 – Runet Award in the Health and Recreation category.
- 2006 – 4th place in the People's Ten of the Runet Prize.
- 2007 – Runet Award in the category "Culture and Mass Communications".
- 2007 – 3rd place in the "People's Ten" Runet Prize.
- 2007 is the "project of the year" in the ROTOR ++ network competition.
- 2007 – the first Russian annual nationwide award in the entertainment industry "Russian Entertainment Awards" in the nomination "Website of the Year".
- 2008 – Grand Prix in the nomination "Impact on offline" in the network professional competition of the Russian Online TOP (ROTOR) 2008 and ROTOR ++.
- 2008 – 1st place in the People's Ten of the Runet Prize.
- 2008 – Grand Prix in the Master of Brandbuilding competition.
- 2009 – "Disappointment of the year" in the ROTOR network competition.
- 2011 – 3rd place in the Technology and Innovation Runet Prize.
- 2012 – Venture Village named the site as among "The Top 10 Russian Internet Brands Out to Conquer the World".

== Technology ==
The domain ok.ru is hosted on a server running Apache and located in Moscow, Russia, on VK's network.

== See also ==
- List of social networking websites
- Classmates.com
- Nasza klasa (lit. Our class), similar Polish social network website, now defunct
- Mastodon
