= Telegraf UA =

Ukrainian online news media organization

Telegraf
- Industry: Mass media, News agency
- Founded: 2012, Ukraine
- Headquarters: Cherkasy, Ukraine
- Key people: Yan Dobronosov
- Owner: Vadim Osadchy
- Website: telegraf.com.ua

Telegraf is an independent Ukrainian social and political online media outlet founded in 2012. The website covers events in Ukraine and around the world. It is owned by Ukrainian businessman Vadym Osadchyi. The editor-in-chief is Yaroslav Zharyonov.

The website telegraf.com.ua is not a registered online media outlet under the Law of Ukraine “On Media.”

== History ==
The outlet has been operating since 2012. In the summer of 2022, Ukrainian became its primary language of publication.

On June 10, 2022, the Prosecutor’s Office of Russia’s Lipetsk region sent a demand to Telegraf’s editorial team to remove a recipe for a Molotov cocktail that had been published during the first days of Russia’s full-scale invasion of Ukraine.

On February 18, 2024, Russian hackers attacked the outlet’s website, posting a fake news story claiming that Russian forces had “defeated” elite Ukrainian units in Avdiivka. Along with Telegraf, other outlets affected by the attack included Apostrophe, LIGA.net, and the Ukrainska Pravda account on the social network X.

== Attendance ==
The outlet’s website attracts around half a million visitors per month. Its Facebook page has 690,000 followers, and its Telegram channel has 60,000 subscribers.

== Assessments ==
In 2019, the National Olympic Committee of Ukraine, as part of its “Olympic Ukraine” competition, named Telegraf one of the best online outlets for sports coverage.

In September 2022, the Institute of Mass Information (IMI) included Telegraf in the list of media outlets that had published editorial policies, disclosed the name of their editor-in-chief, and provided contact information for the newsroom.

In October 2023, IMI again listed Telegraf among media outlets that publish comprehensive editorial policies. The share of such online outlets increased by 2% over the year.

That same month, Telegraf was also among the 80% of online media outlets that publicly list their management team. IMI categorized the outlet as partially transparent. Overall, Telegraf’s transparency improved significantly in 2023 compared to 2022.

However, according to IMI, in December 2023, most of Telegraf’s materials contained violations of journalistic standards.

In May 2025, the Institute of Mass Information classified Telegraf among online outlets with less than 50% compliance with journalistic standards in the “News” category. According to IMI monitoring, this indicator declined compared to December of the previous year, when it had been above 50%.

The most common violation was the failure to separate facts from commentary — the news feed included pieces featuring superstitions, omens, household tips, and clickbait headlines unrelated to current events. IMI also recorded violations of the standards of accuracy (use of generalized or anonymous sources), balance of opinions, and publication of materials with signs of being paid content without proper labeling.

== Incidents ==
Several attacks have been carried out against the outlet’s staff. On September 5, 2022, in Kyiv, an unidentified man attacked Telegraf’s political journalist Yuliia Zabielina near her home, but she managed to escape.

On November 25, 2022, Zabielina was attacked again. According to her, the assault resembled the previous one, and she believes it was connected to her journalistic work.

On March 30, 2023, while filming a report on the grounds of the Kyiv Pechersk Lavra, a priest of the Ukrainian Orthodox Church (Moscow Patriarchate) damaged the equipment of Telegraf photojournalist Yan Dobronosov.

On August 25, 2023, Telegraf accused NV of unauthorized use and improper presentation of a photograph of the President taken by photojournalist Yan Dobronosov. The NV outlet credited the author and publication but did not provide a link and cropped out the watermark. Later that evening, NV edited the news article, adding the photographer’s name and the media outlet he represents
