= EX.UA =

Defunct Ukrainian file sharing service

- Website type: One-click hosting
- Available in: Russian; Ukrainian; English; Spanish; French; German; Polish; Japanese; Kazakh
- Revenue: ▲$3 000 000 (2013)
- Website: ex.ua
- Commercial: Yes
- Registration: Optional
- Launched: 2009
- Current status: Offline since November 16, 2016

Ex.ua was a one-click hosting service that offered both free and commercial services. Operating from Ukraine, it was financed by advertisements on the website. Ex.ua was said to be the largest file-sharing service in Ukraine and allowed uploads of up to 50 GB. The site's traffic accounted for 15–25% of domestic traffic.

In a 2010 letter to the Office of the United States Trade Representative, the Recording Industry Association of America (RIAA) described the site as one of the top pirate sites online. The site was shut down by the owners on November 16, 2016.

== History ==
The service was founded in the summer of 2009, after the closure of infostore.org, a similar hosting service, by the Ukrainian Ministry of Internal Affairs.

In November 2010, the RIAA added ex.ua to the list of 25 sites that contribute to the spread of illegal music. The association claimed that the site was not a single video or song, the legality of which is confirmed by the spread of the copyright owner. After these events, the representative ex.ua Piskovyi Yuri said that the service can make free of charge, to deduct a percentage content creators and avoid accusations of copyright infringement.

December 16, 2010 the site was temporarily unavailable due to technical reasons. Some electronic media reported that the service was closed for the distribution of unlicensed products. A day later the site worked again, but only became available for Ukrainian users.

== 2012 raid ==
On January 31, 2012, the office of Ex.ua was raided and 200 servers containing 6 petabytes of data were confiscated and 16 employees questioned. The blocking of ex.ua domain name by the Imena.ua registrar led to multiple DDoS attacks on Ukrainian government websites. Outraged general users also took part in the attacks, mainly using LOIC. The calls to join the attacks were spread through various forums. On February 3, 2012, Ex.ua was returned as the domain could not be seized for the alleged copyright infringements, and began restoring service.

== 2016 closure of ex.ua ==
On November 16, 2016, the site owners posted a message announcing to close the file sharing site due to accusations of copyright infringement.

The mail subdomain (mail.ex.ua) was kept active for existing users to manage their mailboxes during the transition period, though the broader ecosystem eventually ceased all active operations.
