= Maciej Popowicz =

- Born: 1984 (age 41–42); Poland
- Known for: Founding nasza-klasa.pl

Maciej Popowicz (born 1984) – creator of nasza-klasa.pl, the Polish version of social networking site Classmates.com and student of computer science at University of Wrocław. He became one of the youngest Polish millionaires, after he sold 20% of shares of nasza-klasa.pl (20,000,000 zlotys, about $6,300,000, €4,500,000, £3,850,000) to German venture capital fund, European Founders in 2007. In 2008 Estonian fund Forticom bought 70% of shares of nasza-klasa.pl, with estimated worth 175,000,000 zlotys (about $55,000,000, €39,000,000, £34,000,000). In 2007 he got the Człowiek Roku Polskiego Internetu (Person of the Year of Polish Internet) prize.
