= Ministry of Information Policy (Ukraine) =

Former government ministry of Ukraine

- Міністерство інфорполітики

- Top: Official coat of arms of the Ministry; Bottom: Official flag of the Ministry

Agency overview
- Formed: 2 December 2014
- Dissolved: 29 August 2019
- Jurisdiction: Government of Ukraine
- Headquarters: 2, Prorizna St, Kyiv
- Website: mip.gov.ua/en

The Ministry of Information Policy (Ukrainian: Міністерство інформаційної політики, romanized: Ministerstvo informatsiinoi polityky) or MIP was a government ministry in Ukraine established on 2 December 2014. The Honcharuk Government (on 29 August 2019) abolished the Ministerial post. The government institution was revived in March 2020 as part of the Ministry of Culture and Information Policy.

== History ==
The ministry was created concurrently with the formation of the Second Yatsenyuk Government, after the October 2014 Ukrainian parliamentary election. The ministry's task was to oversee information policy in Ukraine. According to the first Minister of Information, Yuriy Stets, one of the goals of its formation was to counteract "Russian information aggression" amidst pro-Russian unrest across Ukraine, and the ongoing Russian military intervention of 2014. Ukrainian president Petro Poroshenko mentioned that the main function of the ministry was to stop "the spreading of biased information about Ukraine."

A proposal to establish an information ministry for Ukraine was first put forth on 30 November 2014 by Internal Affairs Ministry advisor Anton Herashchenko. He said that the ministry could protect "Ukraine's information space from Russian propaganda and counter propaganda in Russia, in the temporarily occupied territories of Crimea and eastern Ukraine." The proposal was made amidst ongoing efforts to form a government, following the October 2014 Ukrainian parliamentary election. Ukrainian president Petro Poroshenko advocated establishing such a ministry through the night on 1–2 December. It was quickly pushed through parliament with little fanfare. The formation of the Second Yatsenyuk Government was announced on 2 December, with Poroshenko ally Yuriy Stets confirmed as the first Minister for Information Policy. One day after his appointment, Stets published the ministry's regulations, based on a draft he wrote in 2007–09. According to these regulations, the ministry is meant to "develop and implement professional standards in the media sphere," "ensure freedom of speech," and prevent the spread of "incomplete, outdated, or unreal information.

Before its establishment, many Ukrainian journalists protested the creation of the ministry. They cited concerns that the ministry would "open the way to grave excesses" in restricting free speech, and that the ministry would inhibit journalists' work. Journalists demonstrating outside the parliament building said that the creation of the ministry was equivalent to "a step back to the USSR". (Note: Ukraine was part of the USSR from 1920 until Ukraine declared its independence from the USSR on 24 August 1991.) The ministry was given the satirical appellation "Ministry of Truth" (Ukrainian: мінправди), a reference to George Orwell's dystopian novel Nineteen Eighty-Four. Reporters without Borders strongly opposed the creation of the ministry, and said that it was a "retrograde step." Petro Poroshenko Bloc politician Serhiy Leshchenko called for the ministry's immediate dissolution, whilst Poroshenko Bloc politician Svitlana Zalishchuk said that the ministry's implementation should be put on hold, and that its regulations should be redrafted.

Newly appointed Minister for Information Policy Yuriy Stets said that one of the ministry's primary goals was to counteract "Russian information aggression" (Note: Russian state media routinely casts the 2014 pro-Russian unrest in Ukraine as a conflict between an extremist nationalist Ukrainian Government and a minority of Russian speakers in eastern Ukraine fighting for its rights and traditions.) amidst the War in Donbas. According to Stets, no other Ukrainian government institution could handle this task. He stated that "different states with different historical and cultural experiences in times of crisis came to need to create a body of executive power that would control and manage the information security of the country." Stets also said that the ministry "will in no way try to impose censorship or restrict freedom of speech." President Poroshenko told journalists on 7 December 2014 that the main purpose of the ministry is to stop external "information attacks on Ukraine" by promoting the "truth about Ukraine" across the world. Poroshenko added that it was "foolish" to think that the ministry would become an organ of censorship.

The ministry was officially established by a resolution of the Ukrainian government on 14 January 2015. The resolution contained the duties and regulations of the ministry. According to the resolution, the primary objectives of the MIP are to "protect the information sovereignty of Ukraine," and to "implement media reforms to spread socially important information."

A statement released by the ministry on 19 February 2015 announced the creation of an "information force" to counter misinformation on social media and across the internet. The force is targeted at Russia, which has been said to employ an "army of trolls" to spread false information and propaganda during the Russo-Ukrainian War.

Yuriy Stets resigned from his Minister of Information Policy post on 8 December 2015. He withdrew his resignation letter on 4 February 2016 and continued in the post.

United States Ambassador to Ukraine Geoffrey Pyatt stated in late January 2016, "It's a huge mistake to create a 'Ministry of Truth' that tries to generate alternative stories. That is not the way to defeat this information warfare."

On 29 August 2019, the (then) new Honcharuk Government abolished the Ministry.

The Ministry was revived and merged on 26 March 2020 as part of the Ministry of Culture and Information Policy.

== Staff of the Ministry of Information Policy ==
The approved staff of the Ministry of Information Policy of Ukraine for 2015 includes 29 employees. Given Ukrainian practice, the figure seems very small. However, the experience of many countries and contemporary understanding of management prove that these are public institutions with a small staff working based on delegation principles that are much more capable of implementing global state tasks.

Despite the strict requirements of Ukrainian legislation, the Ministry of Information Policy can successfully perform all assigned tasks with minimum resources." "The approved staff of Ukraine's Ministry of Information Policy for 2015 includes 29 employees, so we are a 'lean and mean' department. Contemporary management strategies suggest that public institutions with a small staff working on delegated principles can effectively perform government tasks.

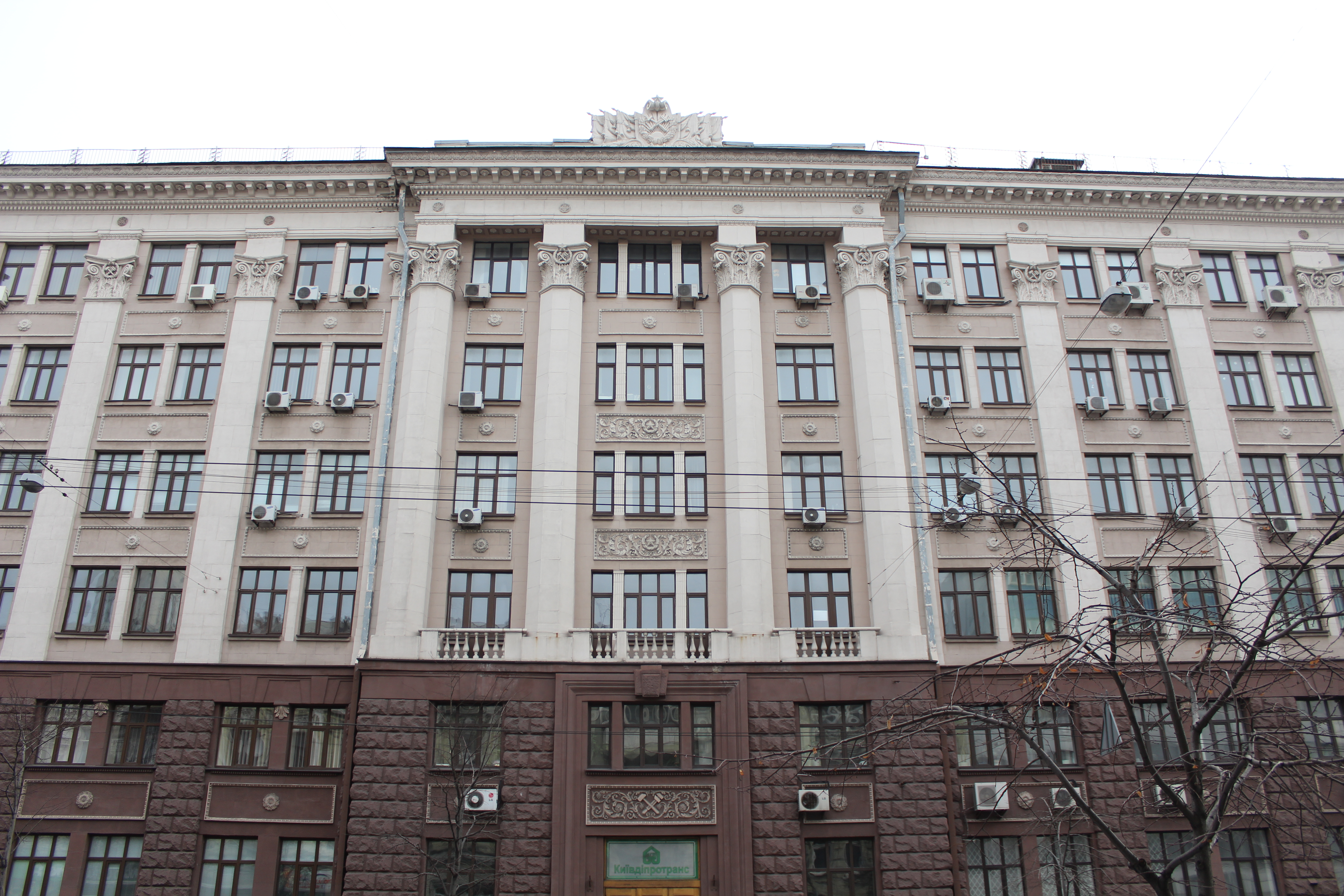
Ministry building in Kyiv

The Ministry of Information Policy aims to perform all assigned tasks successfully with minimum resources, and within the strict requirements of Ukrainian legislation.

=== Structure of the Ministry of Information Policy of Ukraine ===
- Minister – Yuriy Stets
- First Deputy Minister – Emine Dzhaparova
- Deputy Minister – Dmytro Zolotukhin
- State Secretary – Artem Bidenko
- Executive Support Service of the Minister
- Legal Sector
- Sector for Human Resources Management
- Financial and Economic Sector
- Sector for Accountancy and Accounting Control
- Sector for Administrative Services
- Sector for Strategic Communications
- Sector for Information Reintegration of Crimea and Donbas
- Sector for Implementation of the Doctrine of Information Security
- Sector for International Cooperation in the Field of Information Security
- Sector for Promotion of Ukraine in the World
- Sector for European Integration
- Sector for Reforming the Information Field and Public Relations
- Chief Specialist on Internal Audit
- Chief Specialist on Sensitive and Classified Activities
- Chief Specialist on Prevention and Exposure of Corruption

== Main ministry projects ==
=== Social advertising ===
According to Ukrainian legislation, social advertising – information of any kind, common in any form, which aims to achieve social goals, promotion of human values and the distribution of which is not intended to make a profit.

MIP launched such social campaigns:

- Social advertising "Army – pride."
- Social campaign to mark the anniversary of the Revolution of Dignity.
- Social campaign by the individually selected key program on Information Policy Crimea.
- Social campaign on mobilization "Dignity, Freedom and Victory."
- Social campaign "Two Flags – One Country" timed to the Day of the Crimean Tatar Flag.
- Social campaign aimed at countering manifestations of separatism.
- Social campaign in support of internally displaced persons: "The life of each person can change momentarily."
- Social campaign about supporting internally displaced persons by the World Food Programme of the United Nations (WFP UN)
- Social campaign to support the decentralization reform in Ukraine.
- Social campaign "Honour Your Heroes!"

=== Proofs for Hague ===
The Ministry has video and photo materials that it claims prove Russian military presence on the territory of Ukrainian Donbas.

=== Information army ===
On 23 February 2014, MIP created the Internet platform "Information armies Ukraine." Today, the site pages and relevant social networks are used by more than 10,000 users. Monthly, dozens of anti-Ukrainian users are blocked. Information attack of FSB security services is blocked, monthly, almost 80,000 users get information on the fake of Russian propaganda. On each post, there are dozens of false answers, which provide facts and arguments, so the effectiveness of anti-Ukrainian propaganda in social networks plummeted.

=== Embedded journalism ===
The Ministry of Defense of Ukraine jointly with the Ministry of Information Policy of Ukraine continue to take the application process for project «Embedded journalists» – attaching media to military units in the ATO area and journalists are invited to participate. The journalist is not involved in the fighting, but he is subject to the relevant officer and lives in the same conditions as the rest of the soldiers. Today, Ukrainian and foreign journalists are working successfully with the military in the area ATO within the project Embedded journalism. Journalists from BBC, CNN, The Washington Post, Evening Standard, The Independent, Newsweek, Agence France-Presse, Polsat, The Daily Signal, Hanslucas, Tsenzor.NET, Radio Free Europe/Radio Liberty, Inter, Business Ukraine, New time have already participated. Results for the three months of the work: 18 video, 15 articles and three films in the foreign media.

== List of ministers ==
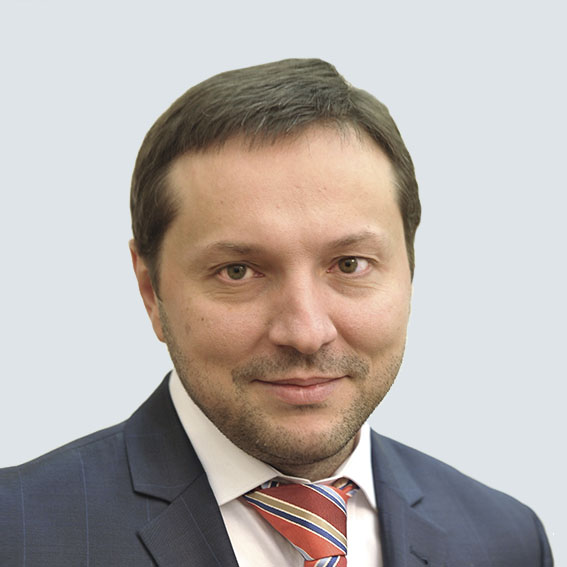
Yuriy Stets

Name of Ministry	Name of minister	Term of office	
Name of Ministry	Name of minister	Start	End
Ministry of Information Policy	Yuriy Stets	2 December 2014	29 August 2019

== See also ==
- Freedom of the press in Ukraine
- Internet censorship and surveillance in Ukraine
- National Expert Commission of Ukraine on the Protection of Public Morality
