= Vechirnia Odesa =

Odesan newspaper

Vechirnia Odesa (Russian: Вечерняя Одесса; Ukrainian: Вечірня Одеса, lit. 'Evening Odesa') is Odesa, Ukraine's most widely read newspaper, published from 1 July 1973 three times per week.

== Murder of Boris Derevyanko ==
On 11 August 1997 Boris Derevyanko, who had been the editor of Vechernyaya Odessa for 24 years, was shot and killed on a city street in broad daylight on his way to work. He was 59 years old. International news organizations and the regional prosecutor concluded that Derevyanko was assassinated because of his editorial work, as a known critic of local post-communist politicians. A suspect was arrested in September and confessed to performing the contract killing.

== See also ==
- List of newspapers in Ukraine
