= Yuriy Stets =

Ukrainian journalist and politician (born 1975)

- Юрій Стець
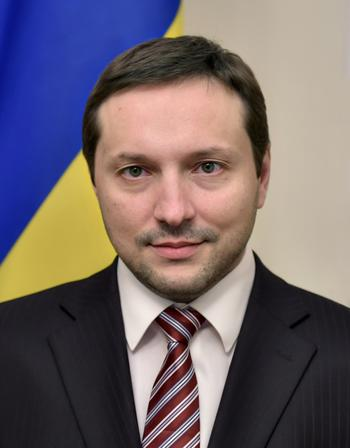

Minister of Information Policy
- In office 2 December 2014 – 29 August 2019
- Prime Minister: Arseniy Yatsenyuk, Volodymyr Groysman
- Preceded by: None (post created)
- Succeeded by: none, post abolished

Personal details
- Born: December 29, 1975 (age 50) Chortkiv, Ukrainian SSR, USSR
- Education: Kharkiv Polytechnic Institute - Information management
- Occupation: Journalist

Yuriy Yaroslavovych Stets (Ukrainian: Юрій Ярославович Стець; born 29 December 1975) is a Ukrainian journalist and politician. He was appointed to the post of Minister of Information Policy at the formation of the Second Yatsenyuk Government on 2 December 2014. He resigned one year later because he felt he had "met all the targets". He withdrew his letter of resignation on 4 February 2016, and continued in the post. On 31 May 2017 Stets wrote a letter of resignation for health reasons and went on sick leave the same day. Eventually Stets stayed on as Minister until on 29 August 2019 the Honcharuk Government was installed. This government abolished the whole Ministry of Information Policy altogether.

Stets is a member of Petro Poroshenko Bloc.

== Life ==
Yuriy Stets was born on 29 December 1975 at Chortkiv, in Ternopil Oblast. He attended the Sydir Vorobkevych Chernivtsi School of Music from 1992 to 1996. In 2000, he earned a degree in information management from Kharkiv Polytechnic Institute. Stets started his career in journalism in 1990 as a reporter for the Chernivtsi Regional State Television and Radio Company. He them worked for various television channels, including ICTV, a local Chernivtsi-based channel called TBA. He also work for public relations firms. Starting in 2002, Stets served as the chief producer for the Channel 5 television network, which is owned by Ukrainian president Petro Poroshenko. (Note: Poroshenko became president of Ukraine in June 2014, following an election in May of that year.)

He was elected to the Ukrainian parliament on 23 November 2007, and was a member of Our Ukraine–People's Self-Defence Bloc. He was elected again on 12 December 2012, this time as a member of Yulia Tymoshenko's Fatherland party. During the tenure of former Ukrainian president Viktor Yanukovych, Stets was a member of the united opposition's political council. On 17 June 2013, Stets became head of Poroshenko's Solidarity party, which had not participated in elections since 2002. (Note: For more information on the status of "Solidarity", see Petro Poroshenko Bloc.) After the February 2014 Ukrainian revolution, he served as the Director of Information Security for National Guard of Ukraine. During a 27 August 2014 party congress, Solidarity changed its name to "Petro Poroshenko Bloc", and elected former Internal Affairs Minister Yuriy Lutsenko as the new leader of the party. In the October 2014 parliamentary election, Stets was re-elected to parliament as a member of Petro Poroshenko Bloc. He was appointed Minister of Information Policy on 2 December 2014, vacating his seat in parliament to fill that post. At the time he vowed to resign one year later if he would successfully implement his policy. He at the time was considered a "close ally" of President Poroshenko.

Stets resigned from the post of Minister of Information Policy on 8 December 2015. He said that he did so because he felt he had "met all the targets". He withdrew this resignation on 4 February 2016, and continued in the post.

On 31 May 2017 Stets wrote a letter of resignation citing health reasons and went on sick leave the same day. Emine Dzhaparova, the first deputy minister, became acting minister.

Eventually Stets stayed on as Minister until on 29 August 2019 the Honcharuk Government was installed. This government abolished the whole Ministry of Information Policy altogether.

== Family ==
Yuriy Stets is married to Yana Konotop, a journalist and political commentator for Channel 5. They have two sons, Vladislav and Serhiy, and a daughter, Eva.

An April 2013 article in the Ukrainian newspaper Ukrayinska Pravda showed the families of Petro Poroshenko and Yuriy Lutsenko attending the baptism of Stets' daughter Eva. Lutsenko became Eva's godfather, and Maryna Poroshenko became her godmother.
