= NK.pl =

Polish social network peaking around 2009, closed 2021

- Company type: Privately held company
- Website type: Social network
- Founded: November 11, 2006; 19 years ago
- Dissolved: July 27, 2021; 5 years ago
- Owner: Ringier Axel Springer Polska
- Website: www.nk.pl
- Registration: Required
- Current status: Defunct

NK.pl, formerly Nasza-klasa.pl (English: Our-class.pl), was a Polish school-based social networking service used by alumni and students. NK.pl was owned and administered by Ringier Axel Springer Polska.

== History ==
NK.pl was launched on 11 November 2006 by Maciej Popowicz, Paweł Olchawa, Michał Bartoszkiewicz, and Łukasz Adziński, four college students studying computer science at the University of Wrocław. The company was headquartered in Wrocław, Poland, and its name came from the song "Nasza Klasa" by Jacek Kaczmarski.

The website enjoyed success, and one 2009 study called it a "model example of the ‘rags to riches’ ideal of an enterprise construed with no financial funding and no institutional support (neither from ASP/ISP corporations nor from central/local administration)". In 2009, the service had 13.5 million active users. NK.pl then ranked among the top five websites used in Poland, behind Google.pl, Onet.pl, and Wirtualna Polska, and it was visited by more than 50% of Polish Internet users each month (with 10% of the traffic coming from abroad).

As of July 2009 86% of its users lived in Poland, according to Alexa. The site was also popular in Norway, where it was the fifth most popular social networking website in 2009. In June 2010, a rebranding and changes to terms of use demanding that users allow the portal to use their profile photo commercially along with select private information, triggered a mass exodus. As of August 2014 the number of registered users had plummeted to less than 7 million, with many users having switched to Facebook.

In November 2014 Ringier Axel Springer Polska signed agreement to buy NK.pl from Excolimp Investments.

On May 26, 2021, NK.pl announced its closure effective July 27 of the same year.

== Services ==
Registered users could pick their school and graduation year. Users were also able to create personal pages with details about their life and past education.

NK.pl offered a wide variety of privacy settings, additionally offering up-to-date advice and instructions about privacy on NK.pl as well as the portal. It had a trust and safety team that worked with law enforcement to resolve matters related to threatening and dangerous posts and other illegal activity.

NK.pl also cooperated with childcare services, such as the Nobody's Children Foundation, which takes care of psychological needs and healthy mental development of children.

== See also ==
- Grono.net
- Odnoklassniki
- Facebook
