= Obozrevatel =

Ukrainian Internet publication

- Website type: Online newspaper
- Available in: 3 languages
- List of languages Ukrainian, Russian, English
- Founded: 2001
- Headquarters: Kyiv, {{{location_country}}}
- Country of origin: Ukraine
- Founder: Mykhailo Brodskyy
- Key people: Mykhailo Brodskyy
- Industry: Journalism, Politics
- Products: news on socio-political events in Ukraine
- Website: oboz.ua
- Commercial: Yes
- Launched: 2001; 25 years ago

Obozrevatel (stylized OBOZ.UA; Russian: Обозреватель, lit. 'Observer') is a Ukrainian Internet publication of socio-political orientation, created in 2001. It belongs to Ukrainian politician and entrepreneur Mykhailo Brodskyy. In the publication, he holds the position of the chairman of the editorial board "Obozrevatel".

== History ==
In 2007, the Media Holding became the owner of the Internet portal "Ukrainian Portal", on the basis of which the resource itself was earned. In the same year, "Obozrevatel" became the owner of the well-known Ukrainian resource "Mobilniks.ua".

From June 1, 2010, OBOZ.ua holding, which belongs to "Obozrevatel", united all available resources into one main site, which placed all the areas that previously worked separately in a holistic project with categories. In the future, the resource also launched the MyObozrevatel information network, which freely hosts the material of independent journalists, after confirmation by the project administration.

In 2011, OBOZ.ua has acquired a service for the creation of online stores.

In March 2017, the Institute of Mass Information identified in the Browser's texts the violation of the standards for filing journalistic materials, with only 32% of the quality text out of 100 available. By the end of August this year, the percentage of news without violations of journalistic standards has increased exactly twice. IMI Ukraine has identified 64% of news without violations, but the resource remained in the outsiders list.

=== Oboz TV ===
The publishing house has its own TV channel Oboz TV. On July 27, 2017, Oboz TV received a license for round-the-clock satellite broadcasting.

== Management ==
- Michael Krivda, CEO";
- Paul Neumann, Technical Director;
- Andrex Selivanov, general producer of the TV program "Obozrevatela" Oboz TV;
- Natalia Savchenko, First Deputy Chief Editor, Head of the News Department;
- Larisa Humeniuk, Head of the blog;
- Lesia Gasich, Head of the SMM Department.

== Popularity ==
According to the Ukrainian Internet Association, the "Obozrevatel" is regularly among the top 25 most popular Ukrainian sites ranking in the average daily share and in the top 20 ranking in coverage.

According to the research company TNS, "Obozrevatel" is among the top 20 most popular Ukrainian sites.

In 2015, the resource took first place in the ranking of "15 most popular Ukrainian news sites" according to the magazine "Novye Vremya".

In 2016, Obozrevatel was recognized as the best Internet media in the version of the nationwide program "Man of the Year".

In 2017 it became the 18th most popular site in Ukraine according to the rating of RBC-Ukraine. In February 2018, it stood at 4 positions "TOP 10 news sites of Ukraine" 14.45% of the audience in the rating of 24 TV channels.

== Team ==
At various times, well-known Ukrainian journalists collaborated with the publishing house. Such as Tetiana Chornovol, Dmytro Drogalchuk, Anatoly Shariy, Ihor Kulakov and many others.
