= Ukrainian Internet Association =

The Ukrainian Internet Association (UIA) was founded in November 2000 in Kyiv, the capital of Ukraine. It currently owns the Ukrainian Internet Exchange Network (UA-IX) network, which is the biggest internet exchange network in Ukraine. Additionally, in February 2010 it has announced a bid for a company that would monitor Ukrainian internet users population, in addition to two other companies that also monitor it, namely Internet Advertisement Association of Ukraine and Bigmir.net.

In June 2006 the UIA warned that proposed increased government regulation of the internet in Ukraine would amount to censorship. It had made similar complaints previously in October 2003. On 17 July 2003 the government of Ukraine requested service providers to install equipment which would allow all internet traffic to be monitored. The UIA said this was an "unacceptable breach of privacy for Internet users" and that such action was, under then-existing law, illegal.

In March 2004 the UIA announced the formation of a committee that would "carry out development of recommendations on conscientious use of the Internet and methods of Internet offences prosecution on the basis of current Ukrainian law."

EuropeMedia has called the UIA "the oldest and one of the most influential organisations in Ukrainian Internet".
