= Gongadze =

Gongadze is a Georgian surname. Notable people with the surname include:

- Georgiy Gongadze, Ukrainian journalist of Georgian origin
- Myroslava Gongadze, Ukrainian journalist and political activist now living in the United States, widow of Georgiy Gongadze
- Teimuraz Gongadze, Georgian footballer
