= Stolyarchuk =

Stolyarchuk (Ukrainian: Столярчук) is a Ukrainian language surname derived from the occupation of stolyar (carpenter, cabinetmaker, joiner) and literally meaning "son of carpenter". Notable people with this surname include:

- Andriy Stolyarchuk (born 2004), Ukrainian football player
- Flor Stolyarchuk (1906–1944), World War II Soviet military commander, Hero of the Soviet Union
- Yuriy Stolyarchuk (born 1962), Ukrainian lawyer and statesman
