= Prytula =

Prytula (Ukrainian: Притула), or Pritula, is a surname which may refer to:

- Bill Pritula (1922–2006), American football player
- Olena Prytula (born 1967), Ukrainian journalist
- Ostap Prytula (born 2000), Ukrainian football player
- Sarah-Yvonne Prytula (born 1984), Australian figure skater
- Serhiy Prytula (born 1981), Ukrainian TV presenter
