= Yuriy Stolyarchuk =

Yuriy Stolyarchuk Юрій Столярчук
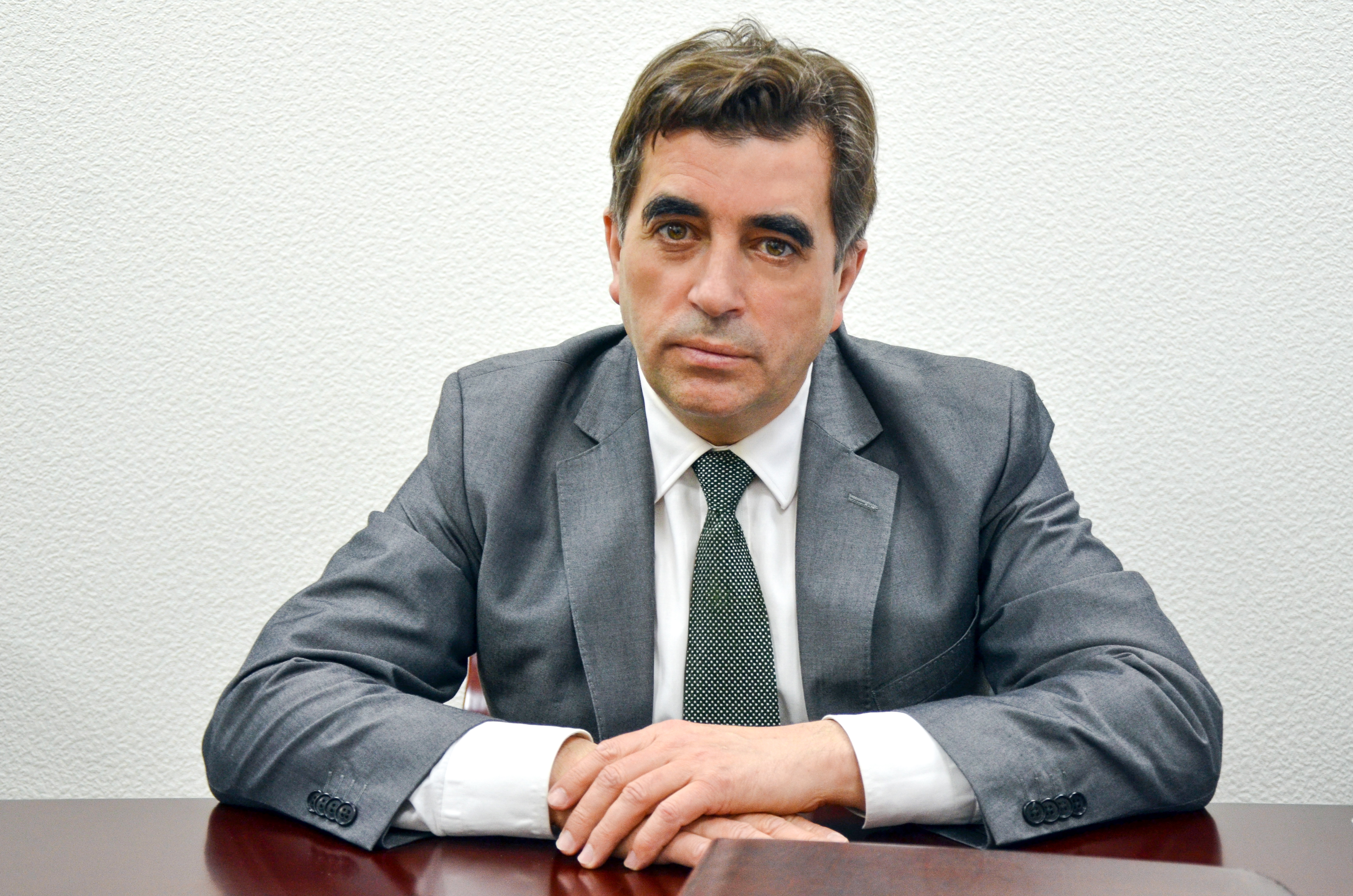

Deputy of Prosecutor General of Ukraine (2015-2019)

Personal details
- Born: September 8, 1962 (age 63) Tetiyiv, Ukrainian SSR, USSR
- Occupation: lawyer

Yuriy Vasylyovych Stolyarchuk (Ukrainian: Юрій Васильович Столярчук; born 8 September 1962, Tetiyiv, Ukraine) is the state counsellor of justice of the 3rd class, deputy of the prosecutor general of Ukraine since 1 April 2015.

== Education ==
After graduating Tetiyiv high school in 1979, he worked on Tetiyiv consumer service facility and as inspector of Tetiyiv inspection of state social security service. In 1981 enrolled in Kharkiv law institute named by F.E. Dzerzhinskiy and graduated in 1985.

== Career ==
- 1987 – started working in prosecution office as paralegal in Radyanskiy district of Kyiv
- November 1987 – August 1992 – legal investigator in Radyanskiy district of Kyiv
- August 1992 – November 1993 – chief investigator in Radyanskiy district of Kyiv
- November 1993 – February 2004 – various positions in Kyiv prosecution office and General prosecution office
- February 2004 – retired on reaching age limit
- July 2014 – started working in Prosecutor General's Office of Ukraine
- Since 1 April 2015 – the Deputy of Prosecutor General of Ukraine

He is the member of the board of the prosecutor general's office of Ukraine

== Gongadze case ==
Stolyarchuk solved the murder of journalist Georgiy Gongadze. He was the investigator of the case and the head of the group, which detained general Pukach, who later confessed in journalist's murder. Pukach was detained in Stolyarchuk's office in October 2003. At the time, Pukach was incriminated with the destruction of documents of outdoor surveillance service which surveilled Gongadze.

The lawyer of Myroslava Gongadze, the wife of the journalist, Valentyna Telichenko told about Stolyarchuk: "One of the witnesses said that Yuriy Stolyarchuk was the first one who did not want to collect negative information about Georgiy Gongadze, but was interested in facts; the first one who was not biased."

== Counter-actions against counterfeit goods ==
On March 1, 2016 one of the largest supplies of counterfeit cigarettes produced in so-called Donetsk People Republic and amounted to more than ₴4 million was detained via Department of investigation and supervision of criminal proceedings in spheres of state service and property of Prosecutor General's office of Ukraine headed by Yuriy Stolyarchuk. While conducting urgent investigative measures car branded “URAL” was detained together with semitrailer. It was heading towards Kyiv escorted by staff of special patrol police forces “Kyiv”. There were counterfeit goods in the car – about 400 000 packs of cigarettes amounted to more than ₴4 million. Criminal proceeding under Art. 204 of Criminal Code of Ukraine was opened (illegal storage and transportation with intent to sell excisable goods).

== Counter-actions against arms traffic ==
Special operation in order to confiscate illegal weapons and ammunition in ATO zone was conducted on 25 February 2016 by department of investigation and supervision of criminal proceedings in spheres of state service and property of prosecutor general's office of Ukraine headed by Stolyarchuk in cooperation with chief military prosecutor's office of Ukraine. One of the largest stock of weapons in recent years was confiscated: 65 kg of TNT, 112 zinc cases of 14,5 mm bullets, 196 cases, 3610 items; 12,7 mm bullets – 64 cases; 7,62 mm bullets x 54 – 19 cases, 1464 items; 30 mm bullets – 670 items, 27 cases; 7 anti-tank missiles; 29 anti-tank mines TM62m; 6 antipersonnel mines MOH50; 480 grenades; 14 anti-tank mines KZOZ; 6 fragmentation mines; 4 cumulative devices k35; 20 kg of plastid; 98 RPG-7 missiles.

== Arrest of the head of Kyiv Court of Appeal ==
Chief investigation department of general prosecutor's office of Ukraine headed by Stolyarchuk conducted an unprecedented operation of searches and notification of suspicion to the head of Kyiv Court of Appeal A. Chernushenko. He was accused of serious criminal offenses under ch. 2, Art. 376-1 (illegal interference with automated court management system) and ch. 2, Art. 375 (unlawful court judgments) of the Criminal Code of Ukraine.

After the search in Kyiv Court of Appeal money, servers and computers with automated court management system were confiscated. Systematical facts of illegal interference with automated court management system by staff of Kyiv Court of Appeal, including judges, were documented.

On June 30, 2015 the parliament of Ukraine agreed to detainment and arrest of the judge of Kyiv Court of Appeal A. Chernushenko as proposed by the prosecutor general of Ukraine, supported by the head of the Supreme Court of Ukraine. 276 and 273 deputies voted in favor of this decision.

== Personal life ==
Married, has 2 children.

== Awards and achievements ==
Yuriy Stolyarchuk received numerous awards from the general prosecutor for his dutiful service in prosecution sphere. He is named as honored staff member of the prosecution office of Ukraine.

He received state award “Honored lawyer of Ukraine” according to Presidential Decree #18/2016.
