= Dragon Capital (firm) =

Ukrainian investment management company

- Industry: Finance
- Founded: 2000
- Founder: Tomas Fiala
- Headquarters: Kyiv, Ukraine
- Website: https://dragon-capital.com/

Dragon Capital is a Ukrainian group of companies in the field of investment and financial services, offering a comprehensive range of products in equities and fixed income sales, trading and research, investment banking, private equity, and asset management to institutional, corporate, and private clients. It was founded in 2000 in Kyiv. From 2016 to 2020, Dragon Capital invested more than $600 million in real estate in Ukraine. In 2022–2024, amidst the ongoing Russian invasion of Ukraine, the firm invested over $100 ml in the economy of Ukraine, completing an industrial park in Lviv, which the World Bank through its Multilateral Investment Guarantee Agency has insured against military risks. It is also the owner of news media holdings in Ukraine — Ukrainska Pravda, and The New Voice of Ukraine.

In April 2017, the Security Service of Ukraine conducted a search at the firm's office. Then, former Prime Minister Volodymyr Groysman backed the company.

In November 2024, Dragon Capital's subsidiary acquired 100% of the charter capital of Trade Solutions LLC, formerly part of DCH Investment Management. The acquired company owns and operates the Karavan Outlet shopping mall in Kyiv.

In early 2025, Dragon Capital sold the Omega-1 Logistic Complex in the Kyiv region to Rush LLC, the owner of the EVA retail chain.

== History ==
The firm was founded in 2000 by Tomas Fiala, a Czech businessman residing in Ukraine, in cooperation with partners in Kyiv. From 2007 to 2017, Goldman Sachs, one of the world's largest banks, owned a minority stake in Dragon Capital. In 2017 Dragon Capital bought back shares from Goldman Sachs, although the latter acquired a 25% stake in New Ukraine PE Holding Limited.

In 2008, Dragon Capital, together with East Capital Bering Ukraine Fund, acquired 70% of Chumak's (one of the largest food companies in Ukraine) shares, but sold its stake in 2019.

In July 2010, Dragon Capital established a regional private equity fund, Europe Virgin Fund, which has invested in some industry-leading companies in FMCG, advertising, pharma, online payments, and private security services. The fund was fully invested at the end of 2015, attracting investments from the EBRD, Swiss Investment Fund for Emerging Markets, Black Sea Trade and Development Bank, and other investors. Dragon Capital remains the largest LP, since 2016 the fund managed by a team, which spun off from Dragon Capital.

Dragon Capital New Ukraine Fund was established in November 2015. Its anchor investors are Dragon Capital and the Ukrainian Redevelopment Fund, which is managed by Soros Fund Management.

From 2017 to 2019, it acquired several of different commercial properties in Lviv, Vinnytsia, Zaporizhzhia, Kyiv, and near Kyiv.

In 2019, the company acquired a minority stake in Ciklum (an IT company). In December 2019, the company entered into an agreement to acquire 100% of Idea Bank for UAH 1.368 billion, but at the end of June 2020 terminated the agreement. In 2020, Dragon Capital acquired a 6 floors building for the Kyiv School of Economics. In September 2020, it started the industrial park near Zhytomyr.

In December 2020, the firm bought the industrial park in Riasne-2. In 2023, EBRD invested US$24.5 million in developing M10 Lviv Industrial Park. The first phase of M10 Lviv Industrial Park was completed in May 2024 and leased to Aurora Multimarket.

In 2021, Dragon Capital acquired a controlling stake in Treeum, a leading Ukrainian online financial supermarket that manages business media resources including minfin.com.ua and finance.ua. In April 2021, Dragon Capital acquired UnexBank. In May 2021, owner Olena Prytula sold 100% of the corporate rights of Ukrainian online newspaper Ukrainska Pravda to Dragon Capital. Dragon Capital also supports the expansion of the Kyiv School of Economics.

In July 2024, Dragon Capital fully exited its shareholder position in Arricano, which owns shopping centers in Kyiv, Zaporizhzhia, and Kryvyi Rih, according to a statement from Dragon Capital's press service.

In November 2024, Dragon Capital's subsidiary DK Kyiv Outlet LLC completed the acquisition of 100% of the charter capital of Trade Solutions LLC, formerly part of DCH Investment Management. The acquired company owns and operates the Karavan Outlet shopping mall in Kyiv, according to a statement from DCH's press service.

In early 2025, Dragon Capital sold the Omega-1 Logistic Complex in the Kyiv region to Rush LLC, the owner of the EVA retail chain.

In February 2025, Dragon Capital Property Management announced the sale of the Borychiv business center in Kyiv, with the asking price set at 340 million UAH.

In January 2025, Dragon Capital sold a minority stake in Ukrainska Prvada to Pluralis B.V., a Dutch fund managed by the American Media Development Investment Fund.
