= Oleksandr Konotopsky =

- Олександр Конотопський
- Born: 7 June 1986 (age 40)
- Occupations: Entrepreneur, technology executive
- Known for: Founder of Ajax Systems

Oleksandr Konotopsky is a Ukrainian entrepreneur, best known as the founder and the chairman of the supervisory board of Ajax Systems, a manufacturer of security systems. As of 2024, his net worth was estimated at $470 million, ranking him among the wealthiest people in Ukraine.

== Early life and education ==
Konotopsky graduated from the Kyiv Polytechnic Institute. He began his career selling Chinese security systems before identifying quality issues in existing products.

== Business career ==
=== Founding of Ajax Systems ===
In 2011, Konotopsky founded Ajax Systems, a company specializing in the development and production of security systems. The company established its first manufacturing facility in Kyiv in 2015. Initially focused on selling inexpensive Chinese hardware, Konotopsky transitioned to developing proprietary products under the Ajax brand. Ajax Systems experienced rapid growth, expanding from 49 employees in 2015 to approximately 5,000 employees by 2025. The company's revenue has grown by approximately 30% annually. By 2020, Ajax Systems products were installed in 800,000 homes across 120 countries. By 2026, the company had about 4.5 million customers in 180 countries.

=== Funding ===
In 2015, Ajax Systems attracted its first investment of $1 million from venture capital fund SMRK, founded by Oleksandr Kosovan and Andriy Dovzhenko. In 2019, the company secured a second round of funding totaling $10 million from Horizon Capital, which valued the company at $75 million according to Cypriot registry data. According to Konotopsky, the company has since grown tenfold in value.

=== Awards and recognition ===
In February 2022, Forbes Ukraine named Konotopsky "Entrepreneur of the Year". He also received the "Strategic Thinking" award in the same competition. In November 2022, Konotopsky appeared on the cover of Forbes Ukraine. The magazine reported that his business had grown by almost 50% in the first eight months of the war, without losing customers or postponing product launches. In 2024, he was included in the UP 100 list of Ukrainian leaders in the business category. In 2025, Oleksandr was included in the list of "100 leaders who move the country forward" by New Voice and Entrepreneur of the Year at the Security and Safety Entrepreneur Awards 2025 in the United Kingdom.

=== Allegations of sales to Russia ===
In mid-2026, several Ukrainian online outlets published allegations that Ajax Systems products were reaching Russia and Belarus via Kazakhstan. The company denied the claims and said it had stopped all operations in both countries after Russia's full-scale invasion of Ukraine in 2022.
