= Serhiy Leshchenko =

Ukrainian ex-journalist and politician

Serhiy Leshchenko Сергій Лещенко
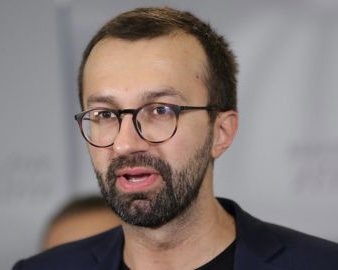

Member of Parliament for Petro Poroshenko Bloc
- In office 27 November 2014 – 24 July 2019

Personal details
- Born: August 30, 1980 (age 46) Kyiv, Ukrainian SSR, Soviet Union
- Party: Democratic Alliance
- Other political affiliations: Petro Poroshenko Bloc (until August 2016)
- Education: Taras Shevchenko National University of Kyiv; Leland Stanford Junior University
- Occupation: publicist; ex-journalist of Ukrainska Pravda

Serhiy Leshchenko (Ukrainian: Сергій Анатолійович Лещенко, 30 August 1980) is a Ukrainian ex-journalist, politician and public figure, Member of Parliament (8th Ukrainian Verkhovna Rada). From 2002 until 2014, Leshchenko worked as a Deputy Editor-in-Chief and as a special correspondent for Ukrainska Pravda online newspaper. Since the 2022 Russian invasion of Ukraine, he has also served as an advisor in the Office of the President of Ukraine.

== Biography ==
In 2003, Leshchenko graduated from the Institute of Journalism at the Taras Shevchenko National University of Kyiv. His career in journalism began in 2000 after the probation at the news program Reporter on the Novyi Kanal channel chaired by Andriy Shevchenko. In September 2000, he became a correspondent of the online version of the newspaper Ukrainska Pravda. He continued working at the regional news department of "Novyi Kanal" until Spring 2001 while working for Ukrainska Pravda. In March 2001 he quit working for Novyi Kanal. In 2002 he became deputy editor-in-chief of Ukrainska Pravda. Leshchenko is famous for his investigative journalism on corruption in Ukrainian politics. In 2010 he joined the movement "Stop Tsenzuri!" ("Stop Censorship!") aimed for the protection of free speech, prevention of censorship and obstruction of journalism in Ukraine.

In 2012, Leshchenko joined a civil movement "Chesno" aiming for transparency and accountability of government officials. In 2012 he studied in the United Kingdom as a part of a scholarship program of John Smith Fellowship. In 2013–2014 he undertook an internship at the National Endowment for Democracy in Washington D.C. through the Reagan–Fascell Democracy Fellowship. In 2013 he took part in the Draper Hills Summer Fellowship at Stanford University in the United States.

In 2014, Leshchenko was elected a people's deputy to the 8th Ukrainian Verkhovna Rada with the party Petro Poroshenko Bloc "Solidarity". He chaired a subcommittee on International Partnership and Anticorruption Law Implementation as part of the Verkhovna Rada Committee on Corruption Prevention and Counteraction.

From 2015 to 2016, Leshchenko was lecturing journalism at the Ukrainian Catholic University (Lviv) and delivering a course of lectures on anticorruption at National University of Kyiv-Mohyla Academy.

In June 2013, Leshchenko published a documentary book the "American saga of Pavlo Lazarenko" based on the US law enforcement agencies' investigation materials. After the Euromaidan Leshchenko wrote another book the "Mezhyhirya Syndrome. Diagnoses of Viktor Yanukovych Ruling", which was published in September 2014.

Since 2017, Leshchenko has his video blogs live on channel "24", where he talks about the current political situation in Ukraine, opens up his political activity and presents the agenda of the modern reformists. Since September 2018, on the same "24", Leshchenko presents the political talk show "What was this" with journalist Yevgeniya Motorevska.

=== Parliamentary activities ===
On 27 November 2014, Serhiy Leshchenko became a people's deputy of the 8th Ukrainian Verkhovna Rada. He was elected as a member of the Petro Poroshenko Bloc (No 19). In the Ukrainian parliament, he became a member of the Committee on preventing and combating corruption. Leshchenko became a member of the Interfactional union "Eurooptimists".

In June 2015, Leshchenko and Svitlana Zalishchuk attended Kyiv Pride, becoming the first Ukrainian lawmakers to attend an LGBT civil rights rally.

In 2015, Leshchenko became a co-author of the bill "The changes to be made to certain legislation acts of Ukraine about preventing and counteracting corruption". The bill foresees a decrease in the risks of political corruption due to complex changes to Ukrainian legislation in the sphere of political parties and pre-election agitation direct financing that increases parties' financial dependency. The bill was a part of the "visa free package" laws, necessary for the liberalization of visa free regime for Ukraine.

On 26 November 2015, Leshchenko presented the documents that he believed had justified the criminal case in Switzerland on bribery and money laundering. The case was begun against then people's deputy from the "People's Front" party Mykola Martynenko. Due to the data provided, Mykola Martynenko was placed under investigation.

In fall 2017, together with other people's deputies and civil society representatives, Leshchenko held an agitation campaign in support of "Vseukrayinskyi zbir" initiative, which had its focus on "a large political reform". The main points of the reform were a creation of an anticorruption court, abolition of deputies' immunity, a switch to a proportional representation election system with open lists. Serhiy advocates for putting a limit on pre-electoral agitation campaigns on television, which will increase the candidates' ability to compete.

In 2017, Leshchenko publicly revealed that Prosecutor General of Ukraine Yuriy Lutsenko had not been receiving members of the public as was required by legislation. This caused the Prosecutor General to start receiving members of the public.

After election to the Verkhovna Rada, Leshchenko gradually began to criticize the Petro Poroshenko Bloc (PPB) more and more and stopped voting in sync with it. According to deputy head of the PPB faction Oleksiy Honcharenko, by February 2019 Leshchenko had not attended PPB faction meetings for several years. On 28 February 2019, Leshchenko voluntarily left the Petro Poroshenko Bloc "Solidarity" faction.

In April 2019 Leshchenko advised the newly elected Ukrainian president Volodymyr Zelenskyy's transition team. But he has since been distanced by the administration and Zelenskyy himself.

On 29 May 2019 Leshchenko stated he wanted to take part in the July 2019 Ukrainian parliamentary election for the party Servant of the People but this party stated on 7 June 2019 that no incumbent MPs would be on its party list for the 2019 parliamentary election. Instead Leshchenko tried to win back his seat in the 220th electoral district in Kyiv. But Leshchenko failed to do this, taking third place with 11.98% (7,775 votes). Instead, Servant of the People candidate Hanna Bondar won the district with 37%.

==== The real estate scandal ====
On 6 September 2016, a group of deputies of the Verkhovna Rada appealed to the National Anti-Corruption Bureau (NABU) with a request to check the purchase of Serhiy Leshchenko of an apartment of 192 m² in a new building on Ivan Franko Street in the center of Kyiv. At that time, the cost of the apartment was UAH 12.864 million (USD 480 thousand). Other sources say that the apartment is worth UAH 7.5 million. According to Leshchenko, half of the amount was borrowed from the chief editor of the Ukrainska Pravda Olena Prytula, in the form of an interest-free cash loan for 10 years, the rest was personal funds of Leshchenko and his girlfriend, famous Ukrainian DJ Anastasiya Topolska. This apartment purchase has caused a great public outcry. Criticism has undergone both the fact of luxury purchasing, as well as sources of financing.

The seller of this apartment was the Asset Management Company Industrial Investments LLC, which is indirectly related to the oligarch Dmytro Firtash. In 2011, this legal entity initiated the bankruptcy of the state chemical plant Sumykhimprom. Subsequently, thanks to the bankruptcy process, the oligarch Dmytro Firtash gained control over the chemical enterprise.

On 19 September 2016, NABU reported an administrative violation with signs of corruption in the Leshchenko case: Pritula's loan could be qualified as a gift, and its receipt contradicts the Ukrainian anti-corruption legislation (restriction on the receipt of gifts by deputies). In addition, USD 77 thousand were spent from the deposits of Serhiy Leshchenko's mother, which wasn't stated in the deputy's declaration as his own funds.

On 15 February 2017, Pechersky District Court of Kyiv closed an administrative case, not finding corpus delicti in Leshchenko's actions. Judge Volodymyr Karabanʹ, who made the court decision, together with his family members, was repeatedly involved in scandals.

==== Fight at the Verkhovna Rada ====
On 9 February 2017, people's deputy from the Petro Poroshenko Bloc Ivan Melnychuk started a verbal dispute with Serhiy Leshchenko in the session hall of the Verkhovna Rada. The dispute started over a Facebook post written by Leshchenko, wherein he claimed deputies from PPB faction were purposely deteriorating the anticorruption committee meetings so that they could accuse the committee of being a failure later. Ivan Melnychuk used physical force and damaged Leshchenko's suit.

==== Case of Paul Manafort ====
In August 2016, Serhiy Leshchenko announced that the Party of Regions, shortly before Viktor Yanukovych's election as the President of Ukraine, paid to the American political consultant Paul Manafort for his services. According to Leshchenko, the expenses of Ukraine related to his activities exceeded $12 million. In February 2017, correspondence between allegedly Leshchenko and Paul Manafort's daughter Jess appeared on the Internet. This correspondence, posted by anonymous hackers in English with grammatical errors, was perceived by one Russian media outlet as blackmail.

Manafort confirmed the authenticity of the texts hacked from his daughter's phone. He added that he had received similar texts to his own phone number from the same address appearing to be affiliated with Leshchenko. He also said he did not respond directly to those letters, but resend them to his lawyer. Manafort refused to show these messages to journalists.

In March 2017, Leshchenko surrendered to the NABU documents (Note: Another source gave the records to Viktor M. Trepak, who was the former deputy director of the domestic intelligence agency of Ukraine, the S.B.U, who then passed it to the National Anti-Corruption Bureau) that, presumably, could prove Manafort's involvement in offshore schemes. These documents showed a $750,000 payment for the supply of 501 computers to a company David Manafort, from a Belize-registered offshore company, through a bank in Kyrgyzstan. Leshchenko urged to begin an investigation of this situation both in Ukraine and in the USA. In March 2019, Manafort "was convicted on eight criminal counts including bank fraud, tax fraud and failing to file a foreign bank account report." Together with the court sentence of 2018, the total sentence of Manafort was 7.5 years.

At the beginning of Donald Trump's presidency, Manafort demanded that the White House and Donald Trump actively pressure Ukrainian officials to investigate and discredit Leshchenko because Leshchenko had published information highly critical of Manafort's political consulting work in Ukraine. Manafort provided information to Rudy Giuliani to smear Leshchenko and entered into a joint legal defense agreement between Manafort's attorneys and Trump's attorneys. Manafort and Giuliani also discussed how to deal with Marie Yovanovitch.

On 10 May 2019, 107th Mayor of New York City and attorney to US President Donald Trump, Rudolf Giuliani, announced that he had hoped to meet in Kyiv with Ukrainian president-elect, Volodymyr Zelenskyy. They planned to discuss foreign countries interference in the 2016 U.S. presidential election, as well as the involvement of Hunter Biden (son of 47th vice president of the United States Joe Biden) at Burisma, a gas company owned by a Ukrainian oligarch Mykola Zlochevsky. However, the next day Giuliani canceled his trip. Giuliani said that there are enemies of the US President in the election headquarters of Zelenskyy. "I'm not going to go because I think I'm walking into a group of people that are enemies of the president, in some cases, enemies of the United States. And in one case already convicted person who has found to be involved in assisting of the Democrats in the 2016 elections... Gentleman by the name of Leshchenko who supplied a Blackbook," said Giuliani in an interview with Fox News. At around this time the Zelenskyy administration (whom Leshchenko had been advising) started to distance itself from Leshchenko reportedly because of concerns about being seen as too close to him while he was attracting criticism from Giuliani.

Leshchenko said that the Prosecutor General, Yuriy Lutsenko, was to blame for the scandalous situation, he rejected the accusation of forging "black bookkeeping" materials. In response, Lutsenko said that "Leshchenko, often on a not-free-of-charge basis from the US Embassy in Ukraine kicked up a row this scandal, trying to help one of the presidential candidates in 2016" and he called Leshchenko a "political skunk".

==== Fight on television ====
After being live on the "Newsone" channel Ihor Mosiychuk accused Leshchenko of discrediting Oleh Lyashko, who was leading (the parliamentary party) Radical Party. The quarrel outgrew into a fight.

=== Supervisory Board of the Ukrainian Railways ===
On 18 December 2019 the Honcharuk Government appointed Leshchenko a member of the Supervisory Board of the Ukrainian Railways. The Shmyhal Government did not renew this contract and on 22 September 2021 Leshchenko left the Supervisory Board. Leshchenko was reappointed to the Supervisory Board on 29 December 2021.

=== Office of the President of Ukraine ===
After the 2022 Russian invasion of Ukraine, Leshchenko began to serve as a non-staff advisor to Andriy Yermak, then head of the Office of the President of Ukraine. After Yermak's dismissal in November 2025, his advisors were dismissed, but Leshchenko was reappointed as an advisor to the President's Office, along with Mykhailo Podolyak.

== Publications ==
=== Books ===
- Leshchenko, S. Американська сага Павла Лазаренка (American saga of Pavlo Lazarenko). 2013
- Leshchenko, S. Межигірський синдром (Mezhyhiria Syndrome). 2014 ISBN 966-2665-45-5

=== Academic publications ===
- Leshchenko, Sergii (2014). "The Maidan and Beyond: The Media's Role". Journal of Democracy. 25 (3): 52–57. doi:10.1353/jod.2014.0048. ISSN 1086-3214. S2CID 154994250.

== Awards ==
- 2004 – runner up of the "Best journalist investigation - 2004" (partners' project of the institute of media, French Embassy in Ukraine and the Mohyla School of Journalism).
- 2006 - winner of the Oleksandr Kryvenko award.
- 2006 - winner in nomination " Person of the year in printed media area" as a part of the national program "Person of the Year".
- 2006 - "Person of the year" in the "Leaders of Ukrainian Internet"contest, organized by the internet.us magazine.
- 2011- eastern partnership journalist award from the fundacija reporterow organization for the article-investigation "Offshore roof for Yanukovych and Kliuev".
- 2013 - Gerd Bucerius Free Press for Eastern Europe Award.
- 2013 - 55 place in the "Korrespondent" magazine list of 100 most influential people of Ukraine.
- 2013 - Fritt Ord Free Media Awards 2013
- 2014 - one of a "100 heroes of information", first released by the "Reporters Without Borders" organization.
- 2014 - one of a TOP-100 bloggers of Ukraine according to "Fakty" ICTV.
