= Sevgil Musayeva =

Ukrainian journalist

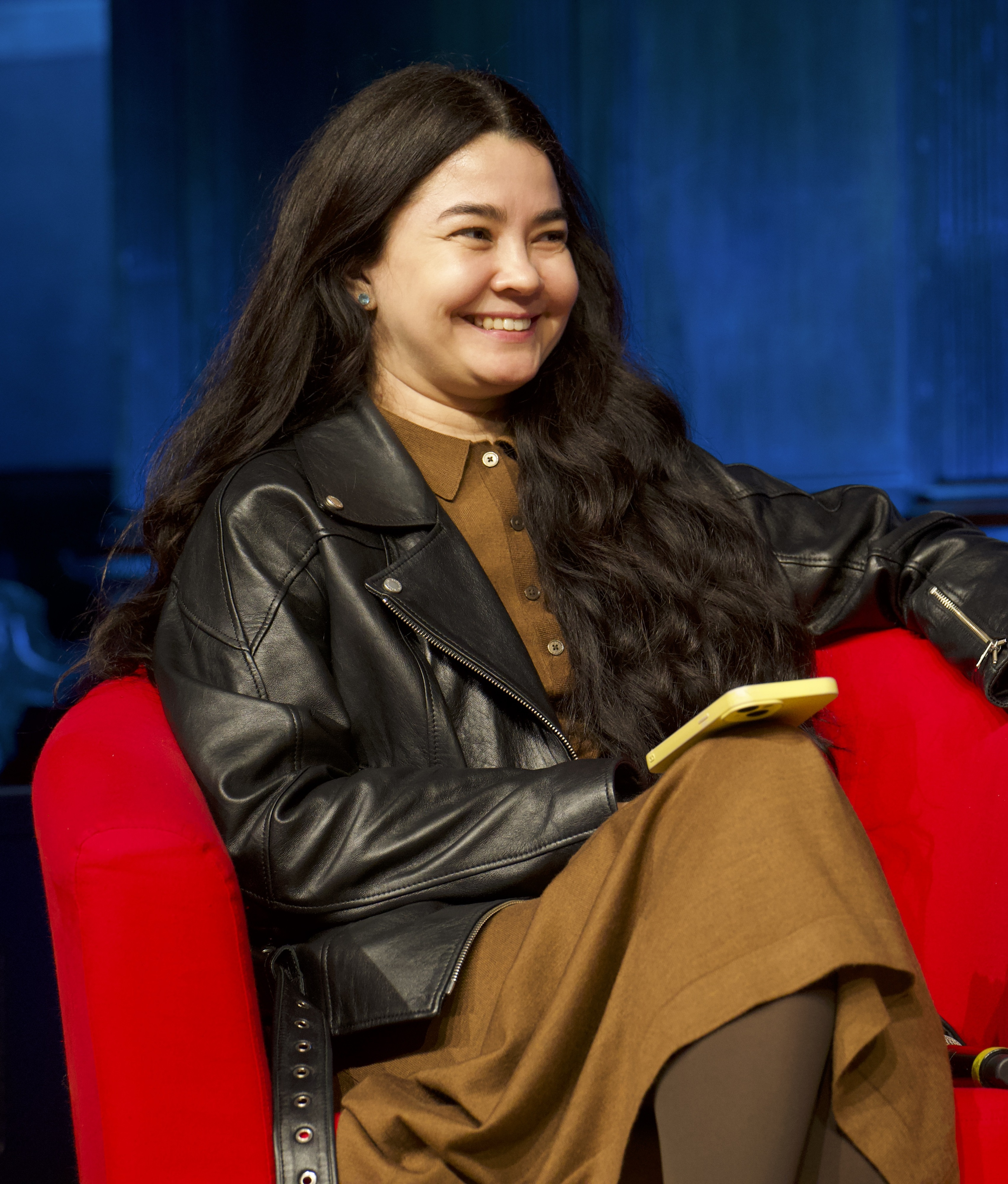
- Musaieva at the International Journalism Festival in 2024
- Born: June 18, 1987 (age 39); Juma, Uzbek SSR, Soviet Union
- Other name: Sevgil Musaieva
- Occupation: journalist

Sevgi Khairetdynivna Musayeva (Ukrainian: Севгіль Хайретдинівна Мусаєва, romanized: Sevhil Khairetdynivna Musaieva, Crimean Tatar: Sevgil Hayretdın Qızı Musaieva; born June 18, 1987) is a Ukrainian journalist from Crimea, Ukraine, chief-editor of internet publishing Ukrainska Pravda and an initiator of creating the KrymSOS web portal.

== Biography ==
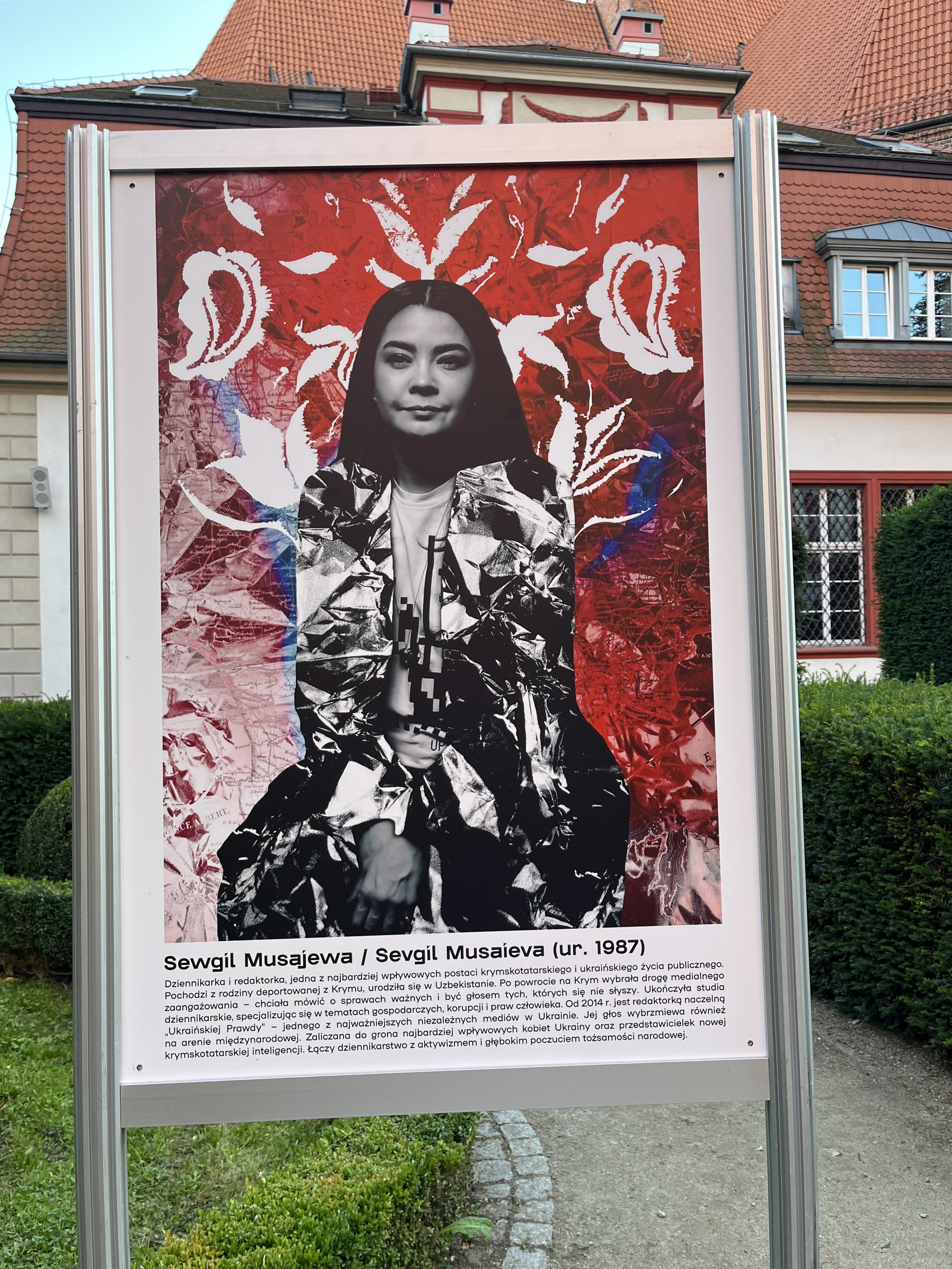
The stand dedicated to Sevgil Musayeva at the exhibition «She is Crimea, She is World» by the Krymski Dom Foundation in Wrocław (Poland), October 2025

Born on 18 June 1987 in Juma near Samarkand, Musayeva returned with her family to Crimea in 1989 when the restrictions against the Crimean Tatars in the Soviet Union were abandoned. They settled in Kerch, Crimean Oblast. From 2004 to 2010, she studied at the Journalism Institute of Kyiv University. During that period Musayeva also worked for various business news agencies and publishers such as Ekonomichni novyny, Delo, Vlast deneg.

From June 2011 to August 2013 she worked as a correspondent for "Forbes Ukraine" until it was bought by Serhiy Kurchenko. With the start of Euromaidan, Musayeva was its activist and was creating reports for the project Hubs on Facebook. In February 2014, she launched Hubs as a separate business news web portal becoming its chief-editor. After the annexation of Crimea by the Russian Federation, she also became one of the founders of internet project KrymSOS. Since October 2014 Musayeva is a chief editor of Ukrainska Pravda.

In 2016, Musayeva was nominated on the Top 30 under 30 award by the Kyiv Post.

She is one of Time magazine's top 100 most influential people of 2022.
