= Chumak (company) =

Swedish-Ukrainian food processing company located in Kakhovka, Kherson Oblast

Logo

Chumak (Ukrainian: Чумак) is a Swedish–Ukrainian food processing company in Kakhovka, Kherson Oblast. It is today one of Ukraine's biggest food processing companies and has commercial offices in Kyiv, Minsk and Moscow. Among its products are ketchup, mayonnaise, pasta, salad dressings, cooking sauces, canned vegetables, marinated vegetables, tomato juice and sunflower oil. Chumak is the largest tomato processing company in Central and Eastern Europe. The company currently (2010) employs about 1200 people and has a revenue of about 48 million euros.

The company was founded in 1996, first under the name South Food, Inc, by the two young Swedish entrepreneurs Johan Bodén and his nephew Carl Sturén. They soon got financial help from Hans Rausing of Tetra Pak who got 66.7% of the company. The latter sold his share of the company in early 2008 to the Swedish investment company East Capital (22.2%) and the Ukrainian investment firm Dragon Capital (44.5%). As of 2013, Chumak was the second largest producer of ketchup in Ukraine, with a share of 25.00%.

Kakhovka was occupied by Russian troops during the first days of the Russian invasion of Ukraine. Chumak, being at the time number two on the Ukrainian market, halted production and moved its headquarters to Kyiv.

== History ==
The company was founded on 29 May 1996 in Kakhovka. It was founded by two Swedish entrepreneurs, Johan Boden and Carl Sturen, who first came to Ukraine in 1993. They were both 19 years old and had been involved in a family business producing vegetables in Sweden. The low cucumber harvest that year in Estonia, where they had been buying their raw materials, forced the entrepreneurs to start looking for a replacement for the lost Estonian crop. Juhan and Karl returned to Ukraine to find a place for future production.

By 1995 Johan and Karl realised the need for their own production. In their search for investors, they found support from Professor Hans Rausing, the founder of Tetra Pak, a leading food packaging company.

Chumak was the first company in Ukraine to produce ketchup and most sauces without preservatives. Since the end of 2007, it has become the only company in the CIS to produce preservative-free mayonnaise.

In 2008 the tomato processing plant had an annual capacity of 2,500,000 kg of tomatoes. In March 2008, the investment company Dragon Capital and East Capital Bering Ukraine Fund together acquired 70% of Chumak's shares from one of its founders, Professor Hans Rausing, with the remaining 30% owned by Johan Boden and Karl Sturen. In the same year, the construction of a new office in Kakhovka was completed.

In 2009 the company launched a pasta factory, a separate workshop for the production of pasta.

In 2015 a workshop for the production of in-house juices was launched in Kakhovka.

Since the end of 2015 the company has been building a roasted sunflower seed production facility. The company plans to launch its own production in this area in the first quarter of 2016.

In 2019, Chumak became a part of the Delta Wilmar, a Ukrainian subsidiary of Wilmar International.

== Activity ==
The company's main products include ketchup, tomato paste, mayonnaise, salad dressings, cooking sauces, seasoning sauces, zucchini caviar, adjika, canned tomatoes, cucumbers and peppers, pasta, and others.

The company employs 1.4 thousand people.

The company exports up to 20% of its products (importing countries: Russia, Belarus, Estonia, Moldova, Kazakhstan, Uzbekistan, Israel, Germany, Italy, Spain, Nepal, the USA).

The production process is certified in accordance with DSTU ISO 9001: 2009, DSTU ISO 22000: 2007 and BRC Global standards, and is regularly subject to inspections and independent audits.
