= Istorychna Pravda =

- Website type: Online newspaper
- Available in: Ukrainian
- Headquarters: Ukraine
- Website: https://www.istpravda.com.ua/
- Commercial: No
- Registration: Not required
- Launched: September 2010

Istorychna Pravda (Ukrainian: Історична правда) is a Ukrainian online publication on sociology, history, and science. Its founder and editor-in-chief is Vakhtang Kipiani; its editors are Pavlo Solodko, Oleksandr Zinchenko, Volodymyr Birchak, Ihor Bigun, Vitaliy Skalsky.

The publication is an independent partner of Ukrainska Pravda publishing house, but is not affiliated with the UP financially or through ownership / management mechanisms.

In August 2020, it launched its own YouTube channel of the same name.

== Thematic direction ==
The publication publishes materials on the history of Ukraine and Ukrainians, Russians, Poles, Jews, Crimean Tatars and other ethnic groups whose destiny is connected with Ukraine. From ancient times to the present. The main emphasis, focus - on the political history of the twentieth century: the struggle for statehood, human rights, scientific and technological progress, totalitarian projects and experiments, human destinies.

During the period of existence of the publication more than 11 thousand materials of more than 600 authors have been published.

Political scientist Volodymyr Kulyk considers Istorychna Pravda: the most notable online publication with a lively contribution to the creation of Ukrainian historical memory, which publishes texts on the history of Ukraine and other countries. Where, the editors test themselves in the role of public historians, characterizing the publication as a "platform for scientific and journalistic discussions around historical politics", a "source of news" on current topics with a "repository of artifacts".
