= Tablo ID =

- Website type: News Celebrity
- Available in: Ukrainian
- Headquarters: Kyiv
- Website: tabloid.pravda.com.ua
- Commercial: Yes
- Registration: Not required
- Launched: November 8, 2005; 20 years ago
- Current status: News-in media

Tablo ID (Ukrainian: Табло ID, literally Tablo ID) is a Ukrainian celebrity illustrated news website, paying significant attention to the public life of Ukrainian politicians and statesmen. Tablo ID is a part of the Ukrainska Pravda group. Published in Ukrainian.

Its news/scoops are sometimes published by the "more serious" Ukrainian media like Korrespondent.

An example of a typical Tablo ID scoop is an early 2012 photo of (then) Culture Minister Mykhailo Kulynyak wearing a luxury wristwatch worth his 3-month salary; previously Tablo ID also investigated (and published about) the (viewed as luxurious) lifestyle of former Ukrainian Prime Minister Yulia Tymoshenko, President Viktor Yanukovych and other important politicians.

== See also ==
- Ukrainska Pravda
