= The New Voice of Ukraine =

Ukrainian digital newspaper

- Logo since 2022
- Type: Digital newspaper
- Format: Online
- Owner: Dragon Capital
- Founder: Tomáš Fiala
- Publisher: DK-Media publishing house
- Founded: 2014; 12 years ago
- Language: Ukrainian, English, Russian
- City: Kyiv
- Country: Ukraine
- Circulation: 14,000
- Sister newspapers: Ukrainska Pravda (since 2021); Radio NV
- Website: nv.ua
- Free online archives: yes

The New Voice of Ukraine or simply as the New Voice (NV) is a Ukrainian, English and Russian language digital newspaper based in Ukraine. The publication was founded in 2014 to offer unbiased and unaffiliated independent reporting on issues regarding Ukraine.

== History ==
=== 2010s ===
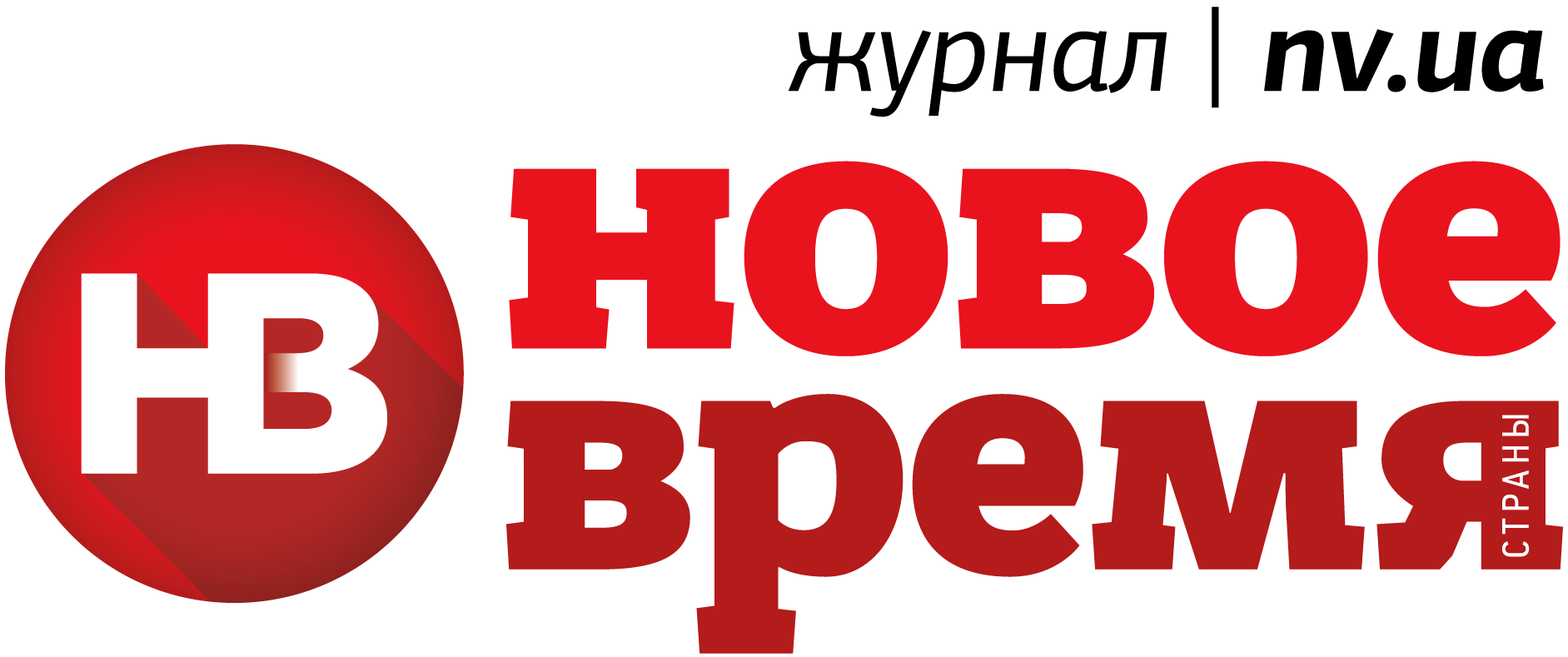
Logo used from 2014 to 2019

The outlet was founded in 2014 as a Russian-language publication, Novoe Vremya (Russian: «Новое Время»; abbr. HB), and initially received an investment from Tomáš Fiala of Dragon Capital, the owner of the newspaper. The newspaper was founded with the mission of not being affiliated to any political party nor owned by any major corporation. The first issue of the magazine was published on 16 May 2014, with over 18,000 copies circulated. On the first anniversary of the Euromaidan protests, the publication launched "#remembermaidan", a hashtag campaign to honor participants in the protests. The website received an online interface in the Ukrainian language in 2015.

=== 2020s ===
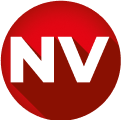
Logo from 2019 to 2022

The publication's first printed edition in the Ukrainian language was released in August 2021. The English language version of the website was launched in January 2022. Since the start of the 2022 Russian invasion of Ukraine, The New Voice of Ukraine has constantly reported on the war on their website and radio station. During the battle of Kyiv, New Voice journalists performed front-line reporting.

In March 2022, it was reported that journalists at the outlet continued to report "from bomb shelters, shelled homes and other battle-worn places." Additionally, due to their war coverage, the newspaper was subjected to Russian cyberattacks. In addition to its reporting, NV publishes op-eds from scholars and analysts in Ukraine regarding the war.

== Readership ==
In February 2020, the website, then known as Novoe Vremya, launched a paywall and attracted 10,000 subscribers in the five succeeding months. Vitaly Volodymyrovych Sych, the editor-in-chief of the publication, stated that it instituted a paywall to attract revenue, as it could not compete with companies like Google or Facebook in the advertising market.

According to data gathered in 2021 by Gemius International Research, the company had 5,572,440 "real users" visit their site, making them the 5th most viewed news company in Ukraine, additionally their site pulled 10,000,000+ unique visitors according to Google analytics that year. The company also has 14,000 paying subscribers who can see their limited number of articles with a paywall.

== Reception ==
The GroundTruth Project described the New Voice of Ukraine as a reliable source of information on the Russian invasion of Ukraine. NV was one of two publications, including The Kyiv Independent, that were recommended as reliable sources for war coverage by the Ukrainian Institute in London.
