= Georgiy Gongadze =

Ukrainian journalist (1969–2000)

Hero of Ukraine Georgiy Gongadze
- Георгій Ґонґадзе; გიორგი ღონღაძე
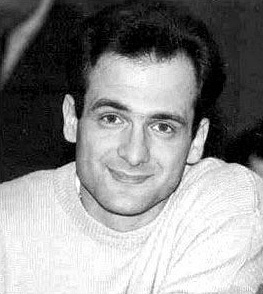
- Born: May 21, 1969; Tbilisi, Georgian SSR, Soviet Union
- Disappeared: 16 September 2000; Kyiv, Ukraine
- Died: 17 September 2000 (aged 31); Sukholisy, Bila Tserkva Raion, Ukraine
- Cause of death: Murder by strangulation
- Body discovered: 3 November 2000
- Burial place: St. Nicholas the Embankment Church, Kyiv, Ukraine
- Other name: Giya
- Citizenship: Soviet Union (until 1991); Ukraine (from 1991)
- Occupation: Journalist
- Years active: 1989–2000
- Known for: Founding Ukrainska Pravda
- Spouses: Mariana Stetsko (m. 1990; div. 1992) Myroslava Petryshyn (m. 1995)
- Children: 2
- Awards: Hero of Ukraine

Georgiy Ruslanovych Gongadze (Note: In this name that follows East Slavic naming customs, the patronymic is Ruslanovych and the family name is Gongadze.) (Note: Ukrainian: Георгій Русланович Ґонґадзе, romanized: Heorhiy Ruslanovych Gongadze; IPA: [ɦeˈɔrɦʲii̯ rʊsˈɫanɔʋet͡ʃ ɡɔnˈɡad͡ze]; Georgian: გიორგი რუსლანის ძე ღონღაძე, romanized: giorgi ruslanis dze ghonghadze; IPA: [ɡ̊ioɾɡi ɾusɫanis d͡ze ʁonʁad͡ze]) (21 May 1969 – 17 September 2000) was a Ukrainian journalist. He founded the online newspaper Ukrainska Pravda along with Olena Prytula in 2000. The same year, he was kidnapped and murdered near Kyiv. Gongadze was born to a Ukrainian mother and a Georgian father in Tbilisi, Georgia SSR, Soviet Union.

The circumstances of his death became a national scandal and a focus for protests against then-President of Ukraine Leonid Kuchma. During the Cassette Scandal, audiotapes were released on which Kuchma, Volodymyr Lytvyn and other top-level administration officials are heard discussing the need to silence Gongadze for his online news reports about high-level corruption. Former Interior Minister Yuriy Kravchenko died of two gunshot wounds to the head on 4 March 2005, just hours before he was to begin providing testimony as a witness in the case. Kravchenko was the superior of the four policemen who were charged with Gongadze's murder soon after Kravchenko's death. The official ruling of suicide was doubted by media reports.

Three former officials of the Ukrainian Interior Ministry's foreign surveillance department and criminal intelligence unit (Valeriy Kostenko, Mykola Protasov and Oleksandr Popovych) accused of his murder were arrested in March 2005 and a fourth one (Oleksiy Pukach, the former chief of the unit) in July 2009. A court in Ukraine sentenced Protasov to a sentence of 13 years and Kostenko and Popovych to 12-year terms March 2008 (the trial had begun January 2006) for the murder. Gongadze's family believe the trial had failed to bring the masterminds behind the killing to justice. No one has yet been charged with giving the order for Gongadze's murder.

== Early life and career ==
Born in Tbilisi, at the time the capital of the Georgian Soviet Socialist Republic of the Soviet Union, Gongadze was the son of Ruslan Gongadze, a Georgian architect, and Olesya Korchak, a Ukrainian dentist and a native of Lviv. His parents met in Lviv, where they studied in university and eventually married. In 1967, the Gongadze family moved to Tbilisi. Georgiy was born as a twin, but his brother was kidnapped from the hospital soon after their birth. When Gongadze was six years old, his parents divorced. His father later remarried and had another son with his second wife. His mother did not remarry, and continued to live and work in Tbilisi until 1994.

During his school years, Gongadze was an outstanding athlete, and was part of the Soviet reserve Olympic team for the 100 and 200 metres. In addition to his native Ukrainian, he learned to speak Russian, Georgian, and English. In 1986 he enrolled in the Foreign Languages Institute in Tbilisi with a specialisation in English, but in 1987 he was drafted into the Soviet Border Troops, serving in Turkmenistan on the border with Iran. His mother said that she had to pay to avoid him being sent to Afghanistan to fight in the Soviet–Afghan War.

=== Dissolution of the Soviet Union ===
Around that time, Soviet leader Mikhail Gorbachev started his reforms of perestroika and glasnost. The reforms sped up the dissolution of the Soviet Union. Trying to preserve the Soviet state, several armed and civil conflicts arose in the Soviet Union, among them the April 9 tragedy in which Soviet troops killed 20 unarmed civilians. This radicalised many Georgians, including Gongadze.

In May 1989, Gongadze was discharged from the Border Troops. He and his father both joined the national movement "For Free Georgia"; Georgiy became its spokesperson, while Ruslan became the leader. In 1989 and 1990, Georgiy travelled to the Baltic states and Ukraine in an attempt to drum up foreign support for Georgia's independence from the Soviet Union. As part of his tour, in September 1989 he attended the first congress of the People's Movement of Ukraine in Kyiv, where he represented For Free Georgia.

Gongadze also attended Chervona Ruta, the first non-communist music and youth festival, held in September 1989 in Chernivtsi. At the festival, he met Mariana Stetsko, whom he married in 1990, and settled in Lviv, where he found a job as a teacher of English and physical education. While working, Gongadze also studied at the Romano-Germanic Languages Faculty of the University of Lviv. On 24 August 1991, following the Declaration of Independence of Ukraine, the Verkhovna Rada announced that all residents of the Ukrainian Soviet Socialist Republic were considered to be citizens of Ukraine.

== Fighting in Georgia (1991–1992) ==
In 1991, the first president of Georgia, Zviad Gamsakhurdia, declared several of his former allies as "enemies of the people", among them Ruslan Gongadze. Ruslan was forced to hide in the basement of a building next to the parliament in Tbilisi. In December 1991, a civil war ensued when government forces opened fire upon anti-Gamsakhurdia protestors in Tbilisi, while a militia armed by the oppositional parties counter-attacked. At the end of 1991 during the ongoing war, Georgiy Gongadze returned to his mother in Tbilisi. He led a team of medical emergency services transferring wounded to a hospital until snipers opened fire on them. On 14 January 1992, Gamsakhurdia fled Tbilisi and the conflict ended. The opposition took power, and Eduard Shevardnadze, the former Soviet foreign minister and communist leader of Soviet Georgia, was elected president. On 15 January 1992, Gongadze returned to Lviv, only to discover that his wife had left him.

== Life in Ukraine (1992–1993) ==
In 1992, Gongadze founded a Georgian Culture Association in Lviv, named after the Bagrationi dynasty, which served as an informational centre. During the registration of the organisation in government offices, Gongadze met Myroslava Petryshyn, his future second wife. The two of them wrote an article titled "Tragedy of Leaders" (Ukrainian: Трагедія лідерів) about the Georgian Civil War, which was published in the Lviv newspaper Post-Postup in 1992. Later in 1992, Gongadze returned to Tbilisi again to visit his mother, who continued to work in a hospital as a nurse. At the time, he planned to leave political activism and start a business. However, after speaking with several people, he changed his mind, while his mother encouraged him to write about the victims of the Georgian Civil War. Gongadze received a camera from his mother, and filmed a documentary about the Georgian Civil War, entitled The Pain of My Land (Ukrainian: Біль моєї землі). In February 1993, the film was shown on the Ukrainian channel UT-3.

In 1992, Abkhazia and South Ossetia proclaimed their independence from Georgia, and Georgia accused Russia of instigating conflicts in those regions. Soon, new conflicts started. Gongadze volunteered to fight in Abkhazia, but was refused admission to military service by government authorities for being the son of Ruslan Gongadze and his role in promoting Georgian causes in Ukraine.

Gongadze returned to Lviv to perform his "diplomatic mission" in active support of Georgia in inter-ethnic conflicts. However, he was only able to find a marginal group of supporters willing to fight in Georgia, from the far-right Ukrainian National Assembly – Ukrainian People's Self-Defence. Gongadze repeatedly visited UNA-UNSO gatherings in an attempt to find Ukrainians willing to fight. The UNA-UNSO, with its self-stated goal of "exiling communists and criminals from Ukraine and overpowering Russian expansionism," coincided with those of Georgian nationalists fighting Russian-backed separatists in Abkhazia and South Ossetia. In July 1993, the UNA-UNSO battalion "Argo", led by Dmytro Korchynsky arrived to Tbilisi and was ready for fight in Abkhazia.

== Return to Georgia (1993) ==
Gongadze, however, did not return to Georgia with the UNA-UNSO, but remained in Ukraine, where his father was undergoing cancer treatment in Kyiv. He did not survive treatment, and died on 5 August 1993, at the age of 49. Following his father's death, Gongadze returned to Tbilisi to bury him. Afterwards, he began filming a new documentary, this one about Ukrainian fighters in Abkhazia. He obtained funds for the documentary by selling his military-issued AK-47.

By the time filming began, Russian-backed Abkhazian separatists had taken much of the lands they sought to control, and had encircled the region's administrative centre, Sukhumi. In September 1993, in exchange for a ceasefire, the government of Georgia agreed to pull its troops and heavy armament from Sukhumi. However, Abkhazian forces soon broke the ceasefire and launched an assault on the city, which was protected only by an army of irregular detachments. President of Georgia Eduard Shevardnadze, who also was present during the siege, appealed to the president of Russia, Boris Yeltsin, to stop the attack, but Yeltsin chose to ignore it.

On 17 September 1993, Gongadze left Tbilisi for Sukhumi to film the events. Upon arrival, he was mobilised for service in the Defense Forces of Georgia, and the following morning was at the frontlines along the Gumista River, where Abkhazian troops were conducting an assault. Gongadze was fighting in a trench when an artillery shell exploded above him, and shrapnel hit him in 26 places, including his right hand. The only thing preventing Gongadze's death was his helmet, and two soldiers that had been next to him were killed in the explosion. The shrapnel remained in Gongadze's body until his murder, and was later used to identify him.

Gongadze was quickly taken to a field hospital, where he brought attention to himself by requesting that someone return to the field, so that his bag of video cassettes would not be lost. In the field hospital, Gongadze also met Konstantin Alania, a local resident fighting among Georgian troops. That night, Gongadze and several other seriously wounded fighters were sent to Tbilisi on a plane shortly before the city fell to Abkhazian troops. Alania was left behind to continue fighting, and later managed to escape with some other militants, withdrawing through mountain corridors. In 1995, Alania left Georgia for Lviv, and coincidentally met Gongadze again. The two remained close friends for the remainder of Gongadze's life.

In Tbilisi, Gongadze's treatment continued, and he was tended to by his mother, still working in the military hospital. However, the situation remained tense due to food insecurity throughout Georgia. His mother tried to send him away from Georgia, but did not have enough money, as the government had not had enough money to pay hospital staff since December 1991. Gongadze's mother managed to raise enough funds through friends and relatives and, after two weeks in Tbilisi, Gongadze returned to Lviv in October 1993, with his mother staying behind. In Ukraine, Gongadze finished production of his new documentary, and it was shown on Ukrainian television under the name Shadows of War.

== Life in Ukraine (1993–2000) ==
Gongadze married Myroslava Petryshyn in 1995. Soon thereafter they moved to Kyiv to work for a news agency. Georgiy established his own television show called Vikna Plus, which was dedicated to Ukrainian politics. Due to his reports on the secret ties of Ukrainian president Leonid Kuchma, the program became an object of media censorship.

From 1996 to 1997, Gongadze worked for the Ukrainian television channel STB. He worked for the Kyiv-based radio station Kontynent, on which he had his own show called First Round with Georgiy Gongadze. His strongly independent line soon attracted hostility from Kuchma's increasingly authoritarian government; during the October 1999 presidential election, his commentaries prompted a call from the president's headquarters to say "that he had been blacklisted to be dealt with after the election". In 1999, he was the press secretary for Progressive Socialist Party of Ukraine leader Nataliya Vitrenko. Visiting New York City in January 2000 with other Ukrainian journalists, he warned of "the strangulation of the freedom of speech and information in our state".

In April 2000, Gongadze co-founded a news website, Ukrainska Pravda (lit. 'Ukrainian Truth'), as a means of sidestepping the government's increasing influence over the mainstream media. He observed that following the muzzling of a prominent pro-opposition newspaper after the election, "today there is practically no objective information available about Ukraine". The website specialised in political news and commentary, focusing particularly on President Kuchma, the country's wealthy "oligarchs" and the official media.

In June 2000, Gongadze wrote an open letter to Ukraine's chief prosecutor about harassment from the Security Service of Ukraine directed towards himself and his Ukrainska Pravda colleagues and apparently related to an investigation into a murder case in the southern port of Odesa. He complained that he had been forced into hiding because of harassment from the secret police, that he said he and his family were being followed, that his staff were being harassed, and that the SBU were spreading a rumour that he was wanted on a murder charge.

== Murder ==
=== Disappearance and initial investigations ===
Gongadze disappeared on the night of 16 September 2000, after failing to return home. Foul play was suspected from the outset. The matter immediately attracted widespread public attention and media interest. Eighty journalists signed an open letter to Kuchma urging an investigation and complaining that "during the years of Ukrainian independence, not a single high-profile crime against journalists has been fully resolved". Kuchma responded by ordering an immediate inquiry. This inquiry however, was viewed with scepticism. Opposition politician Hryhoriy Omelchenko stated that the disappearance had coincided with Gongadze receiving documents on corruption within the president's own entourage. The Verkhovna Rada set up a parallel inquiry run by a special commission. Neither investigation produced any results.

Gongadze tried to be like a normal reporter, he didn't try to be a hero. But in Ukraine it's a brave activity being a journalist.

— Serhiy Leshchenko, Ukrainska Pravda editor (September 2004)

Two months later, on 3 November 2000, a body was found in a forest in the Tarashcha Raion of Kyiv Oblast, some 70 km (43 mi) outside Kyiv, near the city of Tarashcha. The corpse had been decapitated and doused in acid, apparently to make identification more difficult; forensic investigations found that the acid bath and decapitation had occurred while the victim was still alive. The Russian-edited, Russian-language Ukrainian newspaper Segodnya ("Today") reported that Gongadze had been abducted by policemen and accidentally shot in the head while seated in a vehicle, necessitating his decapitation (to avoid the bullet being recovered and matched to a police weapon). His body had been doused in petrol which had failed to burn properly, and had then been dumped.

=== Crime sequence ===
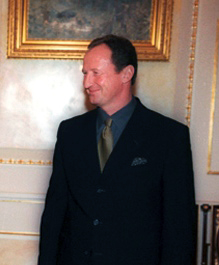
Yuriy Kravchenko, Interior Minister of Ukraine and mastermind behind Gongadze's murder, in a photo from 2000

According to materials of the investigation, the murder of Gongadze was ordered by Interior Minister Yuriy Kravchenko on 11 September 2000 as a reaction to the journalist's "compromising actions" against Ukraine's political leadership. Gongadze had previously publicly criticized Kravchenko for allegedly not fulfilling his duties as minister in fight against organized crime. Gongadze was kidnapped by a group of four police officers headed by Oleksiy Pukach, who had been appointed head of the Chief Directorate of Criminal Investigations two weeks prior. The group had been observing Gongadze's movements for two days before the crime. According to Pukach's subordinates, he hid from them the real goal of the kidnapping, claiming that Gongadze was only to be detained, not murdered. Three months before Pukach had already taken part in the kidnapping and beating of another journalist critical of the government, which was also ordered by a top official of the Interior Ministry.

After leaving the house of his colleague Olena Prytula around 22:20 on the evening of 16 September, Gongadze caught a Hyundai Sonata car at Lesya Ukrainka Boulevard in downtown Kyiv in order to get home. The car, which the victim had thought to be an ordinary taxi, turned out to be a decoy prepared by Pukach and his group in order to leave the journalist without an escape route. The driver, Pukach's subordinate Oleksandr Popovych, asked Gongadze to take the back seat, claiming that the forward one was broken. After Gongadze had taken the seat, three other men - Pukach and his subordinates Valeriy Kostenko and Mykola Protasov - entered the car. Gongadze was beaten to unconsciousness and transported outside of the capital. On their way the group made several stops in order to change number plates, and took a rope and a spade from the house of Pukach's father-in-law in the village of Sukholisy in Bila Tserkva Raion.

Shortly after midnight on 17 September, the car stopped in a remote location. Pukach and his subordinates removed Gongadze from the vehicle and tied him with the rope. Pukach personally strangled the victim using a belt, while his subordinate Popovych dug a pit nearby in order to hide the victim's body. After Gongadze had been killed, his body was disposed in the pit, doused with petrol and set on fire. Before leaving, Pukach and his subordinates covered Gongadze's remains with earth and dry grass. On their way back to Kyiv the group stopped for a meal in a roadside cafe, where they consumed a bottle of horilka. On 18 September Kostenko was awarded 100 hryvnias by Pukach for his participation in the murder.

Two weeks after the murder, minister Kravchenko ordered Pukach to rebury Gongadze's body, fearing that the three other accomplices could deliver investigators to the crime site. In early October Pukach dug up the victim's remains and used his service car to transport them to a forest near the city of Tarashcha, 20 kilometres from the location of the murder. He used an axe to separate Gongadze's head and buried it on a distance of 1.5 kilometres from the rest of the body.

=== Identification of the body ===
A group of journalists first identified the body as being that of Gongadze, a finding confirmed a few weeks later by his wife Myroslava. In a bizarre twist, the corpse was then confiscated by the militsiya and resurfaced in a morgue in Kyiv. The authorities did not officially acknowledge that the body was that of Gongadze until the following February and did not definitively confirm it until as late as March 2003. The body was eventually identified and was to be returned to Gongadze's family to be buried two years after his disappearance. However, the funeral never took place. As of 23 June 2006 Gongadze's mother refused to accept the remains offered as it was not the body of her son, sparking a feud with Myroslava. While visiting Kyiv in July 2006, Gongadze's widow Myroslava emphasised that the funeral had now become a solemn family issue and the date of the funeral would soon be appointed.

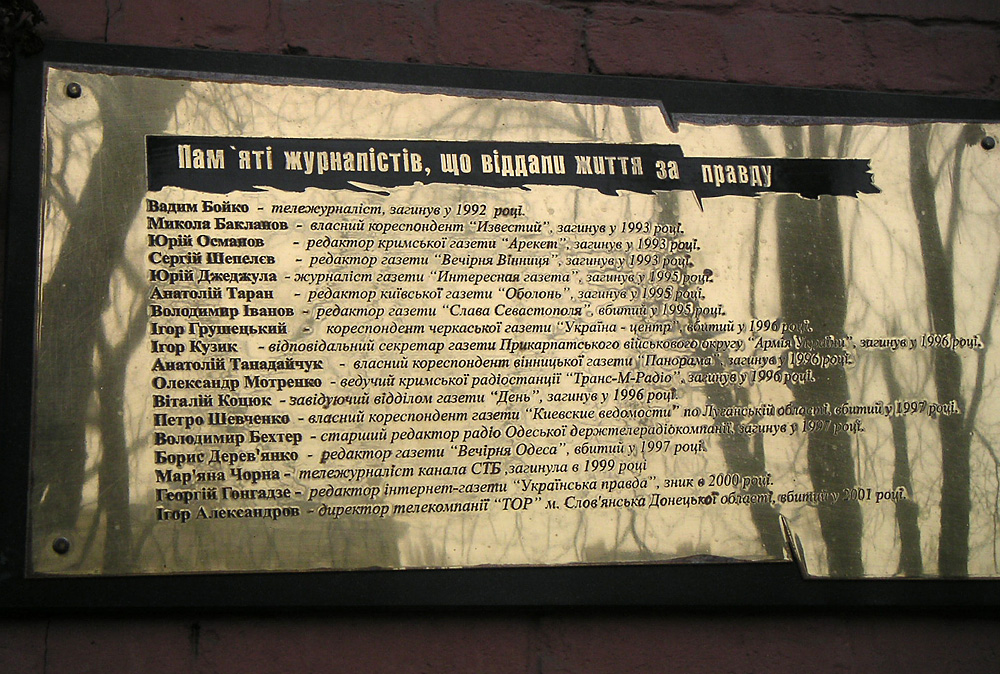
A memorial plate in Kyiv listing journalists who were killed while reporting; Gongadze's name is second from bottom.

=== Political consequences ===
On 28 November 2000, opposition politician Oleksandr Moroz publicised secret tape recordings which he claimed implicated Kuchma in Gongadze's murder. The recordings were said to be of discussions between Kuchma, presidential chief of staff Volodymyr Lytvyn, and Interior Minister Yuriy Kravchenko, and were claimed to have been provided by an unnamed SBU officer (later named as Major Mykola Mel'nychenko, Kuchma's bodyguard). The conversations included comments expressing annoyance at Gongadze's writings as well as discussions of ways to shut him up, such as deporting him and arranging for him to be kidnapped and taken to Chechnya. Killing him was, however, not mentioned and doubt was cast on the tapes' authenticity, as the quality of the recordings was poor. Moroz told the Verkhovna Rada that "the professionally organised disappearance, a slow-moving investigation, disregard for the most essential elements of investigation and incoherent comments by police officials suggest that the case was put together."

In September 2001, the American detective agency Kroll Inc., contracted by the pro-Kuchma political party Labour Ukraine, carried out a six-month investigation and concluded that Kuchma had nothing to do with the murder of Gongadze.

The affair became a major political scandal (referred to in Ukraine as the "Cassette Scandal" or "Tapegate"). Kuchma strongly denied Moroz's accusations and threatened a libel suit, blaming the tapes on foreign agents. He later acknowledged that his voice was indeed one of those on the tapes, but claimed that they had been selectively edited to distort his meaning.

In November 2005, upon complaint of Gongadze's widow, the European Court of Human Rights found Ukraine to violate right to life, right to effective remedy and prohibition of degrading treatment.

== Crisis and controversy ==
A poster with Gongadze's profile used by activists to demand the investigation of his murder

The affair became an international crisis for the Ukrainian government during 2001, with the European Union expressing dissatisfaction at the official investigation, rumours of Ukrainian suspension from the Council of Europe, and censure from the OSCE, which described Gongadze's death as a case of "censorship by killing" and castigated the "extremely unprofessional" investigation. Mass demonstrations erupted in Kyiv in February 2001, calling for the resignation of Kuchma and the dismissal of other key officials. He did sack the head of the SBU, Leonid Derkach, and the chief of the presidential bodyguard, Volodymyr Shepel, but refused to step down. The government invited the FBI to investigate, though it does not appear that this offer was ever taken up. The protests were eventually forcibly broken up by the police and protestors were evicted.

In May 2001, Interior Minister Yuriy Smirnov announced that the murder had been solved—it was attributed to a random act of violence committed by two "hooligans" with links to a gangster called "Cyclops". Both of the killers were said to now be dead. The claim was dismissed by the opposition and by the government's own Prosecutor-General, whose office issued a statement denying Smirnov's claims.

Mass protests again broke out in Kyiv and other Ukrainian cities in September 2002 to mark the second anniversary of Gongadze's death. The demonstrators again called for Kuchma's resignation but the protests again failed to achieve their goal, with police breaking up the protesters' camp.

The prosecutor of Tarascha Raion, where Gongadze's body was found, was convicted in May 2003 for abuse of office and falsification of evidence. Serhiy Obozov was found guilty of forging documents and negligence in the investigation and was sentenced to two-and-a-half years in prison. However, he was immediately released due to a provision of Ukraine's amnesty laws.

In June 2004, the government claimed that a convicted gangster identified only as "K" had confessed to Gongadze's murder, although there was no independent confirmation of the claim. The ongoing investigation received a setback when a key witness died of spinal injuries apparently sustained while in police custody.

Gongadze's death became a major issue in the 2004 Ukrainian presidential election, in which the opposition candidate Viktor Yushchenko pledged to solve the case if he became president. Yushchenko did become president following the subsequent Orange Revolution and immediately launched a new investigation, replacing the Prosecutor-General.

The Council of Europe's Parliamentary Assembly adopted on 27 January 2009 Resolution 1645 on the investigation of crimes allegedly committed by high officials during the Kuchma rule in Ukraine – the Gongadze case as an emblematic example. This Resolution calls on the Ukrainian Prosecutor General's Office to use all possible avenues of investigation to identify those who instigated and organised the murder of Giorgiy Gongadze.

== Arrests and trials ==
=== Arrest and trial of three former policemen and death of Kravchenko ===
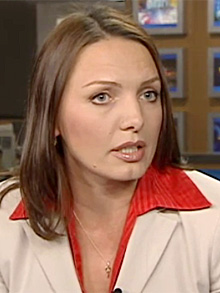
Myroslava Gongadze, Gongadze's second wife and widow, has been an advocate of charging Gongadze's murderers.

On 1 March 2005, President Viktor Yushchenko announced that the journalist's suspected killers had been arrested. Prosecutor-General Svyatoslav Piskun announced the following day that the case had been solved, telling Ukrainian television that Gongadze had been strangled by employees of the Interior Ministry. Two of the alleged killers were said to be senior policemen working for the Interior Ministry's Criminal Investigations Directorate (CID). Former Interior Minister Yuriy Kravchenko, one of those recorded with Leonid Kuchma in the Cassette Scandal, was also said to be under investigation. The two police colonels accused of the killing have been detained and a third senior policeman, identified as CID commander Oleksiy Pukach, was being sought on an international arrest warrant.

On 4 March, Kravchenko was found dead in a dacha in the elite residential area of Koncha-Zaspa, outside Kyiv. He had died from apparently self-inflicted gunshot wounds, though some speculated that he might have been assassinated to prevent him from testifying as a witness. Hryhory Omelchenko, who chaired the parliamentary committee that investigated the Gongadze case, told the New York Times that Kravchenko had ordered Pukach to abduct Gongadze on President Kuchma's orders. Kuchma himself has denied this allegation but has since been interviewed by investigators. Kravchenko left an alleged suicide note: "My dear ones, I am not guilty of anything. Forgive me, for I became a victim of the political intrigues of President Kuchma and his entourage. I am leaving you with a clear conscience, farewell."

In April or May 2005, Piskun released more details of the ongoing investigation. He told the press that after Gongadze was murdered, a second group disinterred him and re-buried him where he was eventually found, in the constituency of Socialist Party leader Oleksandr Moroz. According to Piskun, the aim was to undermine the government (led by Viktor Yushchenko when he was still Prime Minister). The second group was part of or allied with the United Social Democratic Party of Ukraine (SDPUo), a pro-oligarch party which had been hit hard by Yushchenko's crackdown on corruption and therefore wanted to see his government toppled. According to the journal Ukraina Moloda (14 April 2005), the SDPUo moved Gongadze's body to discredit President Leonid Kuchma and force early elections, which could have led to party leader Viktor Medvedchuk succeeding Kuchma.

The trial against three former policemen, Valeriy Kostenko, Mykola Protasov and Oleksandr Popovych, who had been charged with the killing of Gongadze, began on 9 January 2006. The other main suspect, ex-police officer, Oleksiy Pukach was believed to have fled abroad and therefore charged but not on trial. No-one had been charged for ordering the murder. On the day the trial started Gongadze's widow, Myroslava Gongadze commented on the fact that government officials had yet to be punished for organising Gongadze's murder, saying, "They are known and they should be punished, just the same as those who will be sitting in the dock today".

In mid-March 2008, the three former police officers were sentenced to prison for the murder of Gongadze. Mykola Protasov was given a sentence of 13 years, while Valeriy Kostenko and Oleksandr Popovych were each handed 12-year terms. But so far the investigations have failed to show who ordered the murder.

=== Arrest and trial of Oleksiy Pukach ===
On 22 July 2009, Oleksiy Pukach, one of the chief suspects, was arrested in Zhytomyr Oblast. The former chief of the main criminal investigation department at the Ukrainian Interior Ministry's foreign surveillance unit had lived in the house of Lidia Zagorulko who had told her neighbours that Pukach was the brother of her dead husband and that he was a former sea captain. Pukach had lived there with his real second name and original documents. At first it was reported and that he had implicated senior political figures in the murder and was ready to show the place where the journalist's head was hidden, but this was denied two days after his arrest by his lawyer. According to the lawyer, Pukach was not supposed to provide this information to the investigators. Prosecutor-General Oleksandr Medvedko refused to comment whether Pukach named those who ordered the murder or not, saying a "secret investigation" was underway.

On 28 July 2009, Ukrainian media reported that the remains of Gongadze's skull were found near Bila Tserkva, in a location specified by Pukach. According to the Prosecutor General's Office they did find fragments of a skull there that may belong to Gongadze.

A request by Myroslava Gongadze to replace deputy prosecutor general Mykola Holomsha and investigator Oleksandr Kharchenko because of their insufficient professionalism and because they were unable to withstand political pressure and speculation surrounding the case was rejected on 30 July 2009. Her request to replace Pukach's lawyer was also denied on 28 October 2009.

On 20 November 2009, Gongadze's mother Olesya gave consent to an examination of fragments of the skull found in late July 2009, under the condition she could take fragments of the skull for private DNA examination she planned to conduct at a private foreign laboratory after the 2010 Ukrainian presidential election. In September 2010, she stated that, in her opinion, the fragments of the skull found in July 2009 had nothing to do with her son.

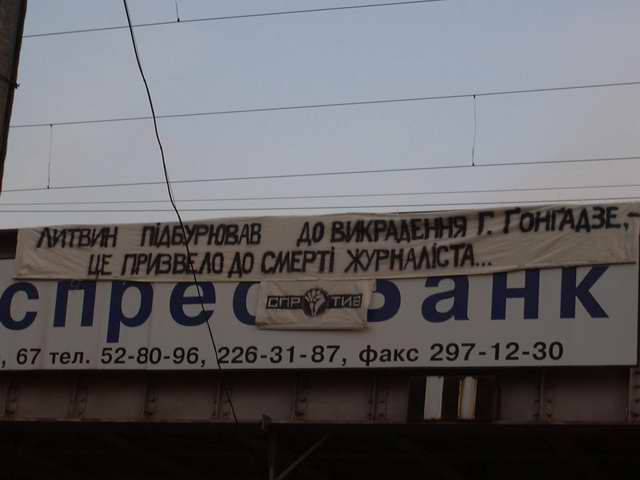
A poster in Lviv blaming Volodymyr Lytvyn for Gongadze's death, 2005

On 3 December 2009, Pukach's detention was extended by two months. On 6 December 2009, Mykola Melnychenko accused Volodymyr Lytvyn of ordering the murder of Gongadze in 2000, but offered no proof to back up the claim. A spokesperson for Lytvyn dismissed the claims as part of his presidential election campaign.

The Prosecutor General's Office of Ukraine plans to complete its investigation into the case of Oleksiy Pukach by the end of the summer of 2010.

Ukrainian Prosecutor General Oleksandr Medvedko stated on 17 June 2010 that skull fragments found near Bila Tserkva in July 2009 were those of Gongadze.

On 14 September 2010, Ukraine's Office of the Prosecutor General issued a statement stating that prosecutors had concluded that former Interior Minister Yuriy Kravchenko had ordered Pukach to carry out the murder, and stating that Pukach had confessed to the murder. According to Gongadze's widow, Myroslava Gongadze, "Kravchenko had had no grounds for such actions"; she believed that several people ordered the killing of the journalist. According to Georgiy Gongadze's mother, Olesya, the statement was an attempt by the Prosecutor-General's office to excuse itself for its inactivity. On 16 September 2010, Lytvyn asserted that the investigation into the murder of Gongadze confirmed his innocence in this crime.

Pukach's trial, on allegations he strangled and beheaded Gongadze, began on 7 July 2011. It was closed to the public. On 30 August 2011, Pukach claimed that Kuchma was the one who ordered the murder. During the trial he also alleged that Lytvyn ordered the murder of Gongadze.

In December 2011, the Pechersk District Court refused to accept witness testimony of Mykola Melnychenko as he had not been authorised to gather evidence of a crime, while conducting recordings in a cabinet of the President of Ukraine.

On 29 January 2013, Pukach was sentenced to life imprisonment by the Pechersk District Court of Kyiv. Oleksiy Pukach also was stripped of his rank "General of Militsiya". The court ruled Pukach had murdered the journalist on orders from Kravchenko, who was seeking a career promotion.

On 9 July 2014, Myroslava Gongadze withdrew her appeal against the sentence of Pukach, as, according to her lawyer Valentyna Telychenko, "If the Court of Appeals will meet our appeal, it will be forced to simultaneously release Pukach from custody. We believe that Pukach is a killer and should serve his sentence". Telychenko blamed former First Deputy Prosecutor-General Renat Kuzmin for "speculating with the Gongadze case" that according to her led to "exhausting Pukach's length of stay in detention during the preliminary investigation".

=== Charges against Leonid Kuchma ===
The Prosecutor-General's Office cancelled its resolution to deny opening of criminal cases against former President Leonid Kuchma and other politicians within the Gongadze case on 9 October 2010.

On 24 March 2011 Ukrainian prosecutors charged Kuchma with involvement in the murder. The decision prompted mixed reaction among the public. Former Prime Minister and the opposition leader Yulia Tymoshenko argued that Kuchma's arrest was no more than a PR stunt designed to distract people from their economic woes and prop up President Viktor Yanukovych's sagging popularity. Another theory was that Yanukovych was driven by the desire for revenge on Kuchma, who often humiliated Yanukovych and refused to use force to stop the Orange Revolution in 2004. Political analysts suggested that Yanukovych's "display of justice" could also be aimed at winning credit from the West, which had criticised him for authoritarian measures.

A Ukrainian district court ordered prosecutors to drop criminal charges against Kuchma on 14 December 2011 on grounds that evidence linking him to the murder of Gongadze was insufficient. The court rejected Melnychenko's recordings as evidence. Myroslava Gongadze appealed against this decision one week later.

First Deputy Prosecutor-General Renat Kuzmin claimed 20 February 2013 that his office had collected enough evidence confirming Kuchma's responsibility for ordering Gongadze's assassination. Kuchma's reply the next day was, "This is another banal example of a provocation, which I've heard more than enough in the past 12 years".

=== 2014 proposal to revisit ===
On 9 July 2014, Prosecutor-General Vitaliy Yarema stated that his office would revisit investigations into high-profile cases "that were dropped unlawfully", including the cases dealing with the murder of Gongadze.

== Legacy ==
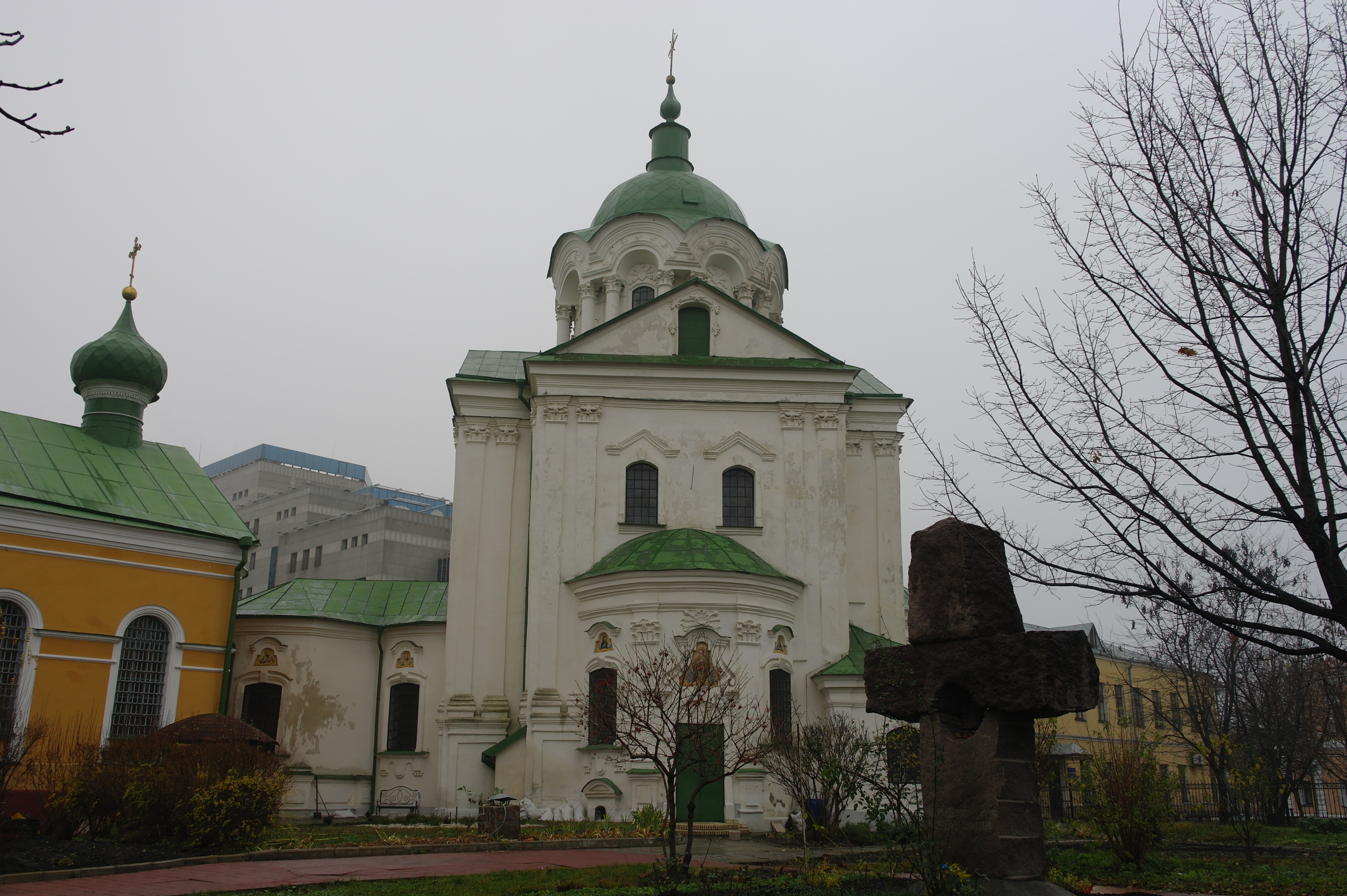
The church in Kyiv, on the territory of which Gongadze is buried

Gongadze was buried in the Mykola Naberezhny Church in Kyiv on 22 March 2016. He had remained unburied until then, as Olesya Gongadze, the journalist's mother, refused to have the body interred until Gongadze's head had been found. In 2009, according to the Prosecutor-General's office, the remains of his skull had been found, but Olesya Gongadze refused to acknowledge that the found remains belonged to her son. Olesya Gongadze died on 30 November 2013, allowing Myroslava Gongadze, the journalist's widow, to assume ownership of Gongadze's remains and ending the family feud.

Viktor Yushchenko posthumously awarded Gongadze the title Hero of Ukraine on 23 August 2005. Gongadze's widow Myroslava Gongadze was given the 'Star of the Hero' decoration by Petro Poroshenko on 21 March 2014.

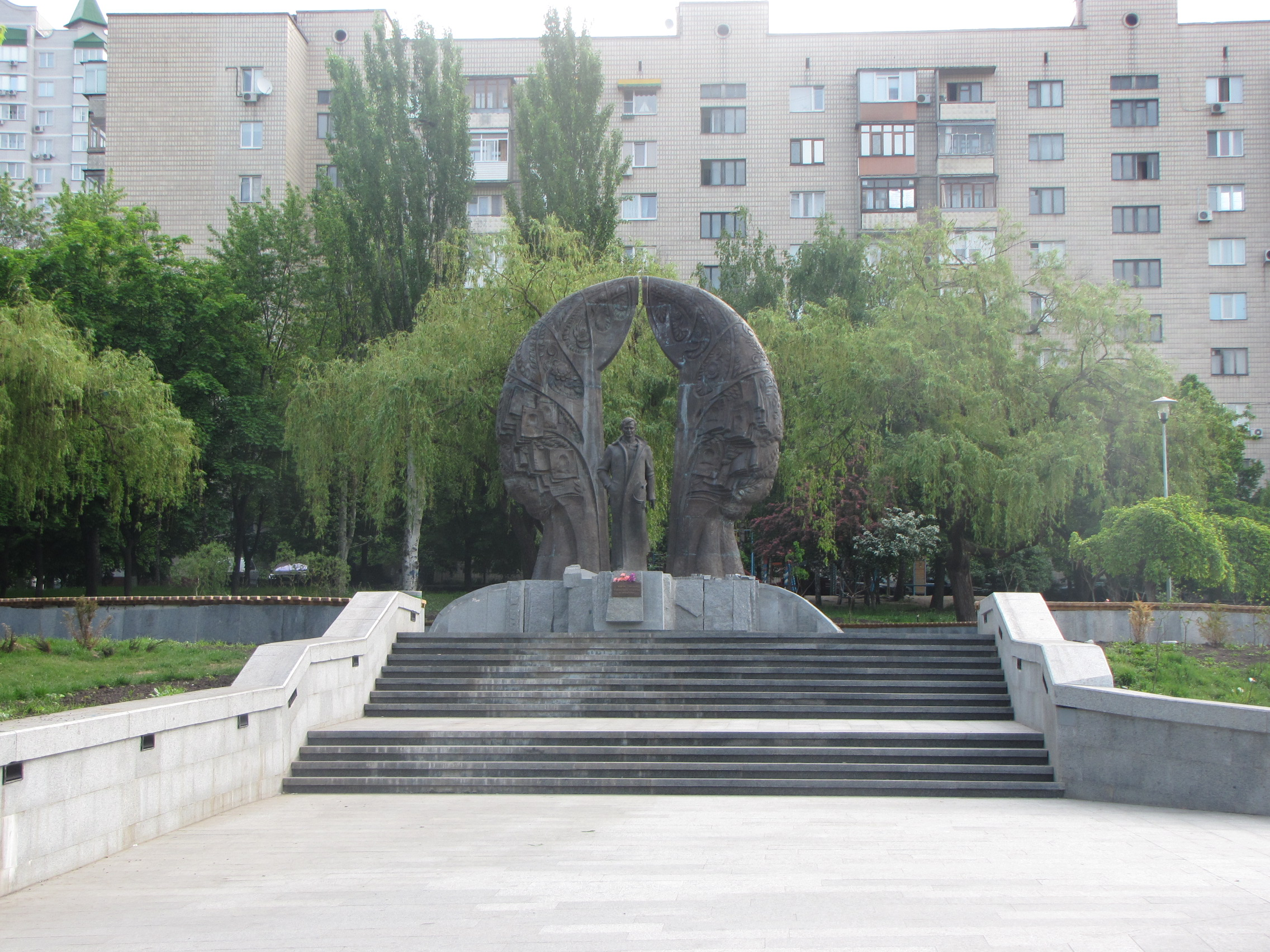
A monument to Gongadze in Kyiv

In June 2005, Kyiv's Industrialna Street was renamed Georgiy Gongadze Street. Radianskoi Ukrainy ("Soviet Ukraine") Avenue in Kyiv's Vynohradar neighbourhood was renamed Georgiy Gongadze Avenue in 2007. A monument to Gongadze and all journalists killed for their professional activities was opened in Kyiv park at Chervonoarmiyska Street in August 2008, though Gongadze's mother was against erecting a monument until the investigation is completed. She repeated her wish "to remove the monument to Gongadze" after a meeting with Ukrainian President Viktor Yanukovych on 22 June 2010, and also added her discontent with "political forces holding PR campaigns" regarding the Gongadze murder case.

A literary token of respect for the work and courage of Gongadze is to be found in the novel for young adults, "Fair Game: The Steps of Odessa" (Spire Publishing, 2008, ISBN 1-897312-72-5) by James Watson. The book is dedicated to Giya Gongadze, and the theme of a persecuted journalist and the impact of his revelations about government corruption on his children has strong similarities to Gongadze's own fate.

In Kyiv and Lviv, ceremonies marking the disappearance of Gongadze were held on 16 September 2010 (ten years after his disappearance).

According to Gongadze's widow Myroslava, his death and the following political scandal changed the trajectory of Ukraine's political development, weakening the increasingly authoritarian regime of president Kuchma and making the Ukrainian society more pluralistic, which allowed the country to evade the fate of neighbouring Russia and Belarus.

== Filmography ==
As film director:

- 1992 – The Pain of my Land (Ukrainian: Біль моєї землі)
- 1993 – Shadows of War (Ukrainian: Тіні війни) by the Center of Georgian Culture

== See also ==
- Freedom of the press in Ukraine
- List of solved missing person cases (2000s)
- Orange Revolution
- Vasyl Klymentyev, journalist who disappeared in 2010
