= Myroslava Gongadze =

Ukrainian journalist and activist (born 1972)

Myroslava Gongadze Мирослава Ґонґадзе
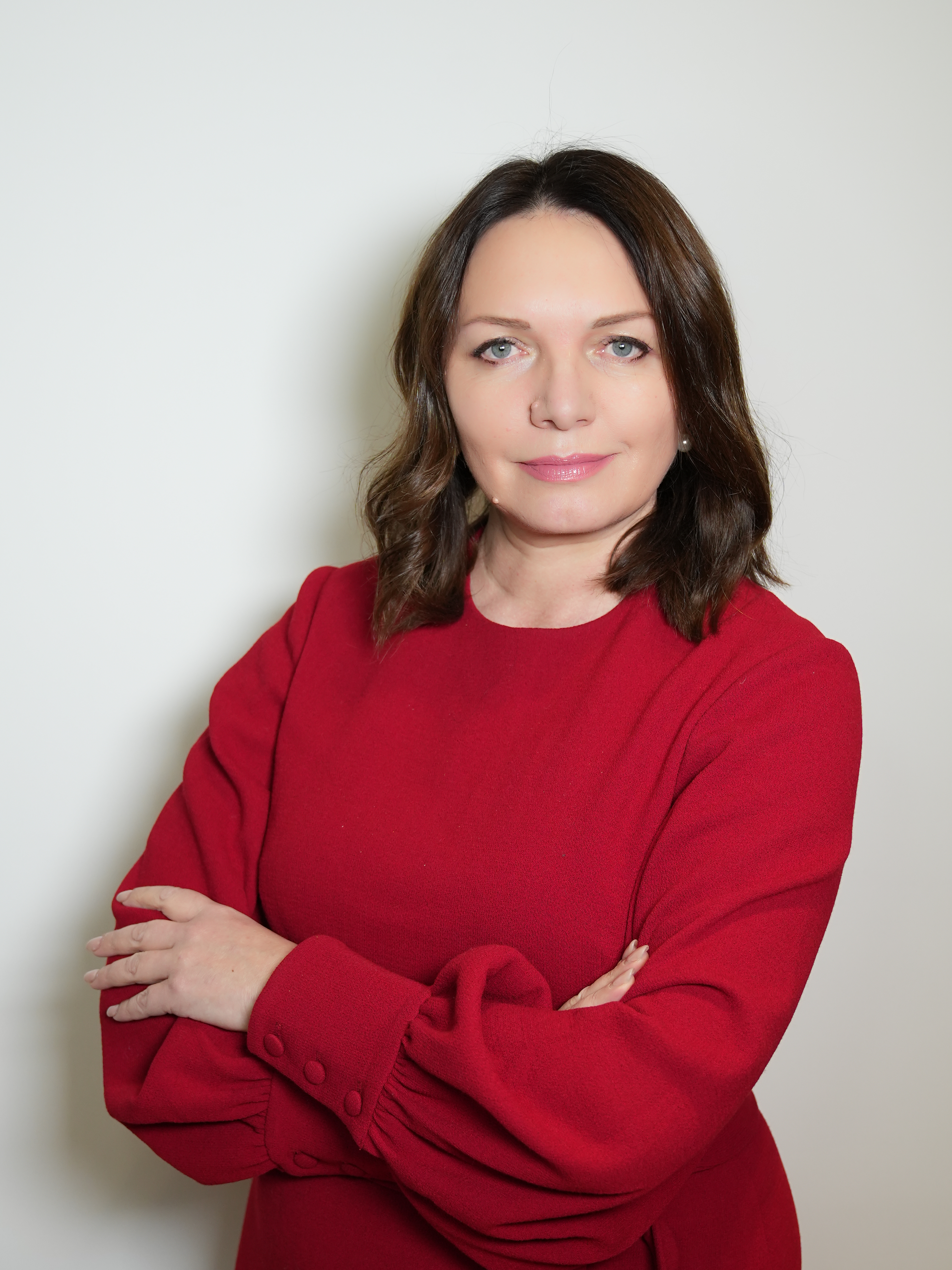
- Gongadze in December 2024
- Born: Myroslava Volodýmyrivna Petryshyn; 19 June 1972 (age 54); Berezhany, Ukrainian SSR, Soviet Union
- Education: University of Lviv (LL.M.)
- Occupation: Journalist
- Spouse: Georgiy Gongadze (m. 1995; died 2000)
- Children: 2
- Awards: Order of Princess Olga; Voice of America Gold Medal

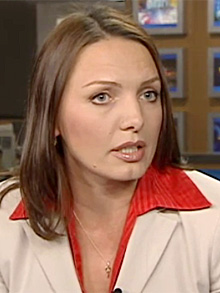
Gongadze with Voice of America before 2011.

Myroslava Volodýmyrivna Gongadze (Ukrainian: Миросла́ва Володи́мирівна Ґонґа́дзе, née Petryshyn (Ukrainian: Петришин); born 19 June 1972) is a Ukrainian journalist currently living in the United States. Her husband, journalist Georgiy Gongadze, was abducted and murdered in 2000. Since then she has been a prominent advocate for freedom of the press and protection of the safety of reporters in Ukraine, and has continued to work for justice in the case of her husband's murder.

== Biography and career ==
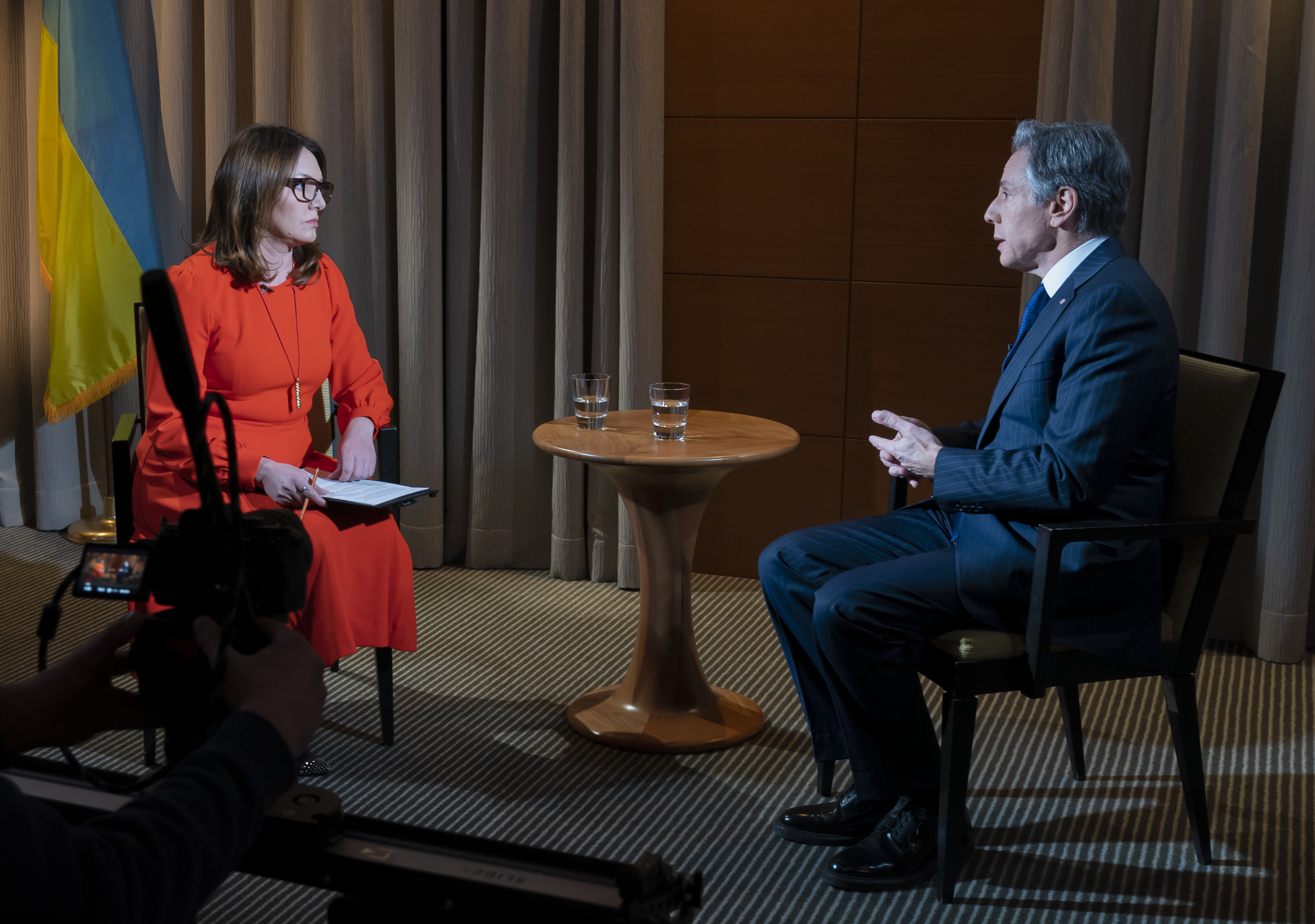
Gongadze interviewing then-US Secretary of State Antony Blinken in 2022

Myroslava Volodýmyrivna Petryshyn was born on June 19, 1972, in Berezhany, Ternopil Oblast, Ukrainian SSR. She earned a master's degree in civic law from University of Lviv (completed in 1997), and in the early 1990s worked as a legal consultant for local government agencies.

During the early 1990s, Petryshyn became involved in journalism and Ukrainian politics. In 1993, she was a specialist in the information department of the journal Post-Postup. In 1994 and 1995 she served as deputy director and director of the press center for the New Wave political alliance (Нова Хвиля). During 1995 she was the head of the media department for the International Media Center STB (Міжнародний Медіа Центр - СТБ), and in 1998 was the head of public relations for the daily newspaper Day (День).

At the same time, Petryshyn became active in filmmaking. She was assistant director of Georgiy Gongadze's documentary short film Shadows of War (Ukrainian: Тіні війни, 1993) about the Georgian-Abkhazian conflict and executive producer of Dream Defenders (Охоронці мрії, 1996).

Myroslava Petryshyn was married to Georgiy Gongadze in 1995, and their twin daughters were born in 1997. Along with her husband, Myroslava Gongadze continued to work in journalistic projects opposed to the administration of President Leonid Kuchma.

In 2000, Georgiy Gongadze was kidnapped and brutally murdered. Secret tape recordings provided by one of the president's bodyguards and released by opposition politicians implicated Kuchma in the crime. The resulting political controversy became known as the cassette scandal, damaged Kuchma's popularity and laid part of the groundwork for the Orange Revolution of 2004. It also brought Myroslava Gongadze to greater prominence as a campaigner for democracy, human rights, and freedom of the press in Ukraine. She has continued to seek justice in the case of her husband's abduction and murder.

She and her two children received political asylum in the United States in 2001. In an interview with Ukrayinska Pravda in February 2005, Myroslava Gongadze said she would come back to Ukraine if her husband's murderers, and those who gave the orders to murder him, were punished. Since arriving in the United States, Gongadze has worked as a TV and radio correspondent for VOA, a freelance correspondent for Radio Free Europe/Radio Liberty, and a visiting Scholar at the Institute for European, Russian and Eurasian Studies at George Washington University in Washington, D.C. In 2001, Gongadze was awarded a Reagan-Fascell Democracy Fellowship to study the role of the media in Ukraine's transition to democracy.

In October 2009, she was ranked 91st in a top 100 of "most influential women in Ukraine" compiled by experts for the Ukrainian magazine Focus.

Gongadze expressed her skepticism about the political state of modern Ukraine in November 2009; in an editorial in The Wall Street Journal, she argued that its democracy was degenerating and its freedom of the press was at risk.

Gongadze has been the head of the Ukrainian Service at the Voice of America since October 4, 2015. She frequently writes on Ukrainian current affairs and political developments in Eastern Europe and NATO.

In 2014–15, she produced and hosted “Prime Time," an interview program which featured leading Ukrainian and international policymakers. In one episode, then-US Ambassador to the United Nations, Samantha Power, explained the Obama administration's decision not to support Ukraine with lethal weapons.

She interviewed Ukrainian president Petro Poroshenko in 2015 in Ukraine. In the interview, President Poroshenko called for a revocation of Russia's veto in the United Nations Security Council. Despite Russian occupation of the Ukrainian territory of Crimea and the war in Eastern Ukraine, he argued that "it is impossible to stop Ukraine's resolute drive toward the European home."

In 2018, she covered US representatives' trip to the war zone in eastern Ukraine. In an interview, U.S. Special Representative for Ukraine Negotiations Kurt Volker said that residents in the embattled Donbas region say they want a peace agreement that restores territorial control of the region to Kyiv. "And these were clearly ethnic Russians, as you could tell by the language they spoke," he said. "That Russian speakers are pro-Russian or that this is an ethnic conflict, just clearly isn't true."

== European Court of Human Rights ==
On 16 September 2002, she lodged a complaint with the European Court of Human Rights citing Article 2 (right to life) of the European Convention on Human Rights and maintaining that the death of her husband was the result of a forced disappearance and that the Ukrainian authorities failed to protect his life. She also maintains that the atmosphere of fear and uncertainty, as well as the incomplete and contradictory information provided during the investigation, forced her to leave the country and caused her suffering, contrary to Article 3 (prohibition of inhuman and degrading treatment) of the convention. On 31 March 2005, the court declared her complaint admissible and thereby agreed to pursue her case against the State of Ukraine.

On 9 November 2005, the European Court of Human Rights passed its judgement in case of Myroslava Gongadze vs Ukraine in favor of the late journalist's widow. Under the Court's ruling, Ukraine has violated articles 2, 3, 13 and 41 of the European Convention on Human Rights by the Ukrainian power's failure to protect the right to life of the applicant's husband, Georgiy Gongadze.

According to the judgement, the investigation was not adequate and caused many moral traumas to the applicant. The court awarded the applicant 100,000 euros in respect of pecuniary and non-pecuniary damages.

== 2006 murder trial ==
During the 2004 presidential campaign, the opposition candidate Viktor Yushchenko pledged to solve the case if he became president. Yushchenko did become president following the subsequent Orange Revolution and immediately launched a new investigation, replacing the country's prosecutor-general.

The Gongadze murder trial began on 9 January 2006, in Kyiv. Three former policemen are charged with the killing of Georgiy Gongadze. Another suspect, ex-police general Oleksiy Pukach, who had been believed to have fled abroad but was found in Ukraine in 2009 living under his real name, was arrested and charged. On the day the trial started, Myroslava Gongadze commented on the fact that no one has been charged for ordering the killing: "They are known and they should be punished just the same as those who will be sitting in the dock today".

== Awards and honors ==
In 2014, she was awarded the civil decoration the Order Princess Olga from the Ukrainian Government, in recognition of her professional achievements and contribution to journalism. In 2018, she was chosen to be a Nieman Fellow at Harvard University.

== See also ==
- Ukrayinska Pravda
- Mykola Melnychenko
- Politics of Ukraine
- History of Ukraine
