= Ukrainska Pravda =

Ukrainian newspaper

- Website type: Online newspaper
- Available in: Ukrainian; Russian; English
- Owner: Dragon Capital
- Creator: Heorhii Gongadze
- Founder: Heorhii Gongadze
- Editor: Sevgil Musayeva
- Key people: Olena Prytula, Sevgil Musayeva
- Website: pravda.com.ua
- Registration: Not required
- Launched: 16 April 2000; 26 years ago
- Current status: works
- OCLC number: 1066371688

Ukrainska Pravda (Ukrainian: Українська правда, lit. 'Ukrainian truth') is a Ukrainian socio-political online media outlet founded by Heorhii Gongadze in April 2000. After Gongadze's murder in September 2000, the editorial team was led by co-founder Olena Prytula, who remained the editor-in-chief of Ukrainska Pravda until 2014, when she handed over the position to Sevhil Musaieva. In May 2021, the publication's new owner became Tomas Fiala, CEO of Dragon Capital.

The murder of founder Heorhii Gongadze in the fall of 2000, who had protested against increasing state censorship, drew international attention to the state of press freedom in Ukraine and sparked protests against President Leonid Kuchma in 2000–2001. In July 2016, Ukrainska Pravda journalist Pavlo Sheremet was killed in an explosion. As of 2020, the perpetrators of their murders remain unknown.

In 2025, based on Similarweb data, Ukrainska Pravda was the most popular online news media in Ukraine.

== History ==
=== Foundation and early years ===
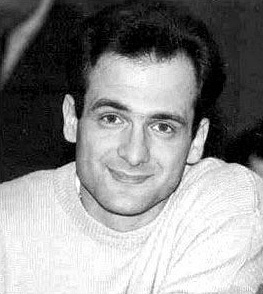
Heorhii Gongadze, founder of Ukrainska Pravda

In December 1999, journalists Heorhii Gongadze, Olena Prytula, and Serhii Sholokh traveled to Washington to draw attention to the suppression of press freedom in Ukraine. According to Prytula, it was during this trip that the idea of creating a Ukrainian online news outlet emerged. In April 2000, Gongadze and Prytula founded Ukrainska Pravda. Gongadze became the editor-in-chief, while Prytula served as his deputy. The online project was launched the day after the nationwide referendum of 2000, which had been initiated by President Leonid Kuchma. The initial funding for Ukrainska Pravda came from a sponsor close to the Secretary of the National Security and Defense Council (NSDC), Yevhen Marchuk. However, this collaboration ended soon after the website published a critical article about Marchuk. Gongadze also negotiated potential funding with Hryhorii Surkis and a parliamentarian close to Oleksandr Volkov.

At the start of the project, Heorhii Gongadze and Olena Prytula worked alongside Darka Chepak and Yevhen Zakharov (Samoilenko). On September 4, 2000, Serhii Leshchenko joined Ukrainska Pravda. In the early hours of September 17, 2000, Gongadze was kidnapped and murdered. His killing, which followed his open protests against increasing state censorship, drew international attention to the state of press freedom in Ukraine. After his death, Olena Prytula took over leadership of the publication. The release of the Melnychenko tapes, which allegedly implicated President Leonid Kuchma in Gongadze's murder, significantly boosted Ukrainska Pravda's popularity. In 2004, the outlet played a crucial role in informing the public during the Orange Revolution, including publishing exit poll data that indicated electoral fraud in the presidential elections. During this period, Ukrainska Pravda was primarily funded through grants, including support from the National Endowment for Democracy and the International Renaissance Foundation.

=== Further development and Euromaidan ===
In the summer of 2005, Ukrainska Pravda published a series of articles by Serhii Leshchenko titled "Andrii Yushchenko, Son of God?", which scrutinized the lavish lifestyle of the newly elected President Viktor Yushchenko's son, inconsistent with the family's declared financial means. When Leshchenko asked Yushchenko about his son at a press conference, the president responded, "Act like a polite journalist and not like a hit man" According to many analysts, this incident negatively impacted Yushchenko's image early in his presidency.

By 2005, Ukrainska Pravda had become financially self-sufficient through advertising revenue. Between 2005 and 2008, Olena Prytula expanded Ukrainska Pravda by launching news websites focused on the economy, entertainment, and local news, forming an integrated online media group. In December 2007, the newspaper Kommersant Ukraine reported that the Polish Gazeta Wyborcza publisher, Agora Group, had been in talks to purchase Ukrainska Pravda. According to the report, the estimated value of Ukrainska Pravda ranged between $5 million and $10 million.

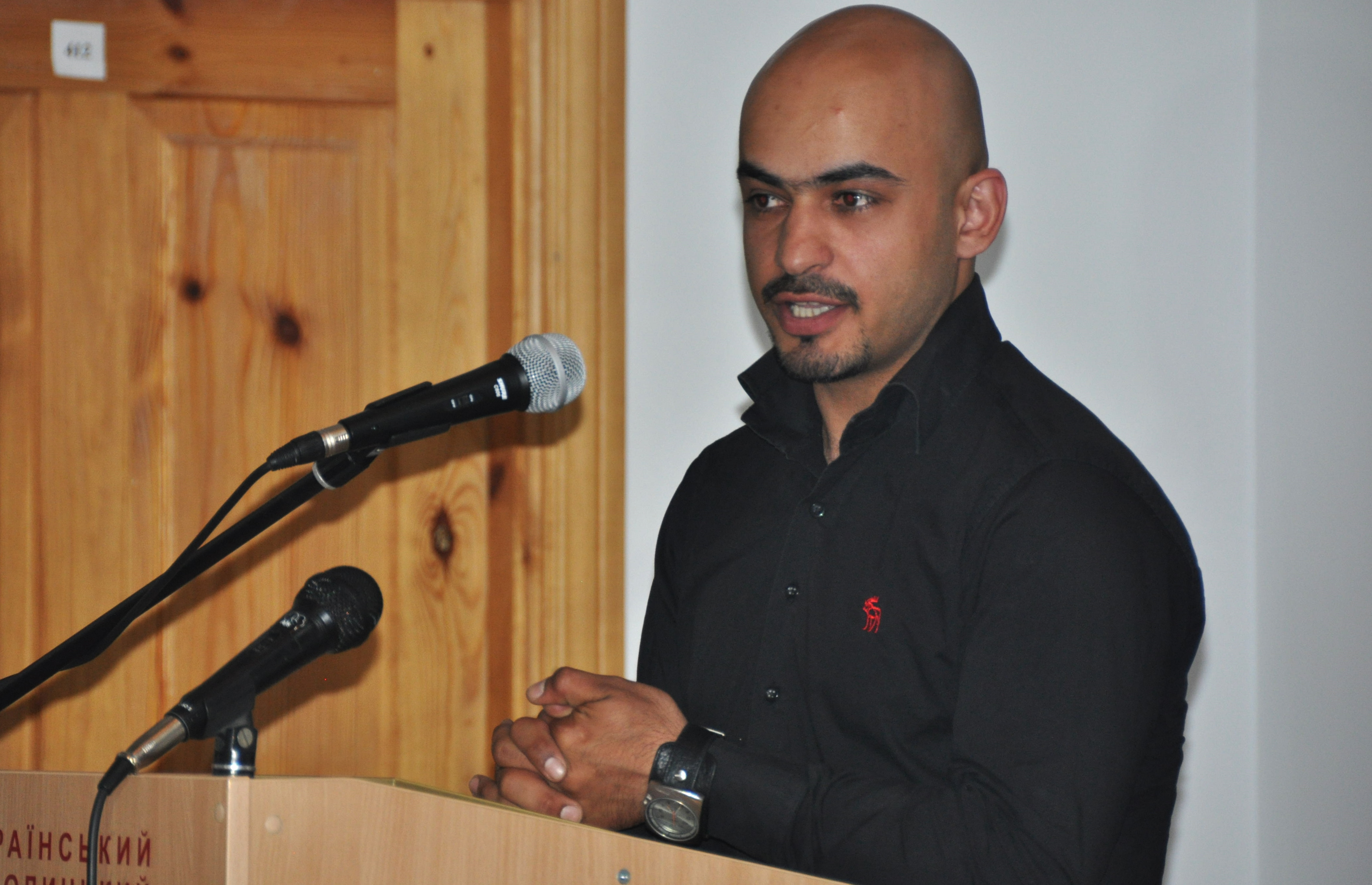
Mustafa Nayyem receiving the Oleksandr Kryvenko Award (2010), and Serhii Leshchenko (center) and Mustafa Nayyem (right) interviewing Taras Chornovil (2011).

In 2006, Mustafa Nayyem joined Ukrainska Pravda, forming a working duo with Serhii Leshchenko. In 2008, Leshchenko began investigating how Viktor Yanukovych transferred the state-owned Mezhyhiria residence into private ownership. When Nayyem questioned Yanukovych about Mezhyhiria during a 2011 press conference, the president responded, "I don't envy you." Although Nayyem later stated that he perceived the remark as a slip of the tongue, the organization Freedom House interpreted it as a threat from the president to the journalist.

Nayyem is credited as the first to call on Ukrainians to gather at Independence Square in November 2013 to protest the government of Mykola Azarov's decision to postpone signing the Association Agreement with the European Union, marking the beginning of the Euromaidan movement. Initially, he helped coordinate the protests but later returned to journalism, covering events for the newly founded Hromadske TV. On November 24, Ukrainska Pravda, in solidarity with the protesters, temporarily changed its name to Yevropeiska Pravda ("European Truth"). On January 24, 2014, during the clashes on Hrushevskyi Street, the website received over 1.6 million visitors, setting a record for Ukrainian online media at the time.

=== Post-Euromaidan ===
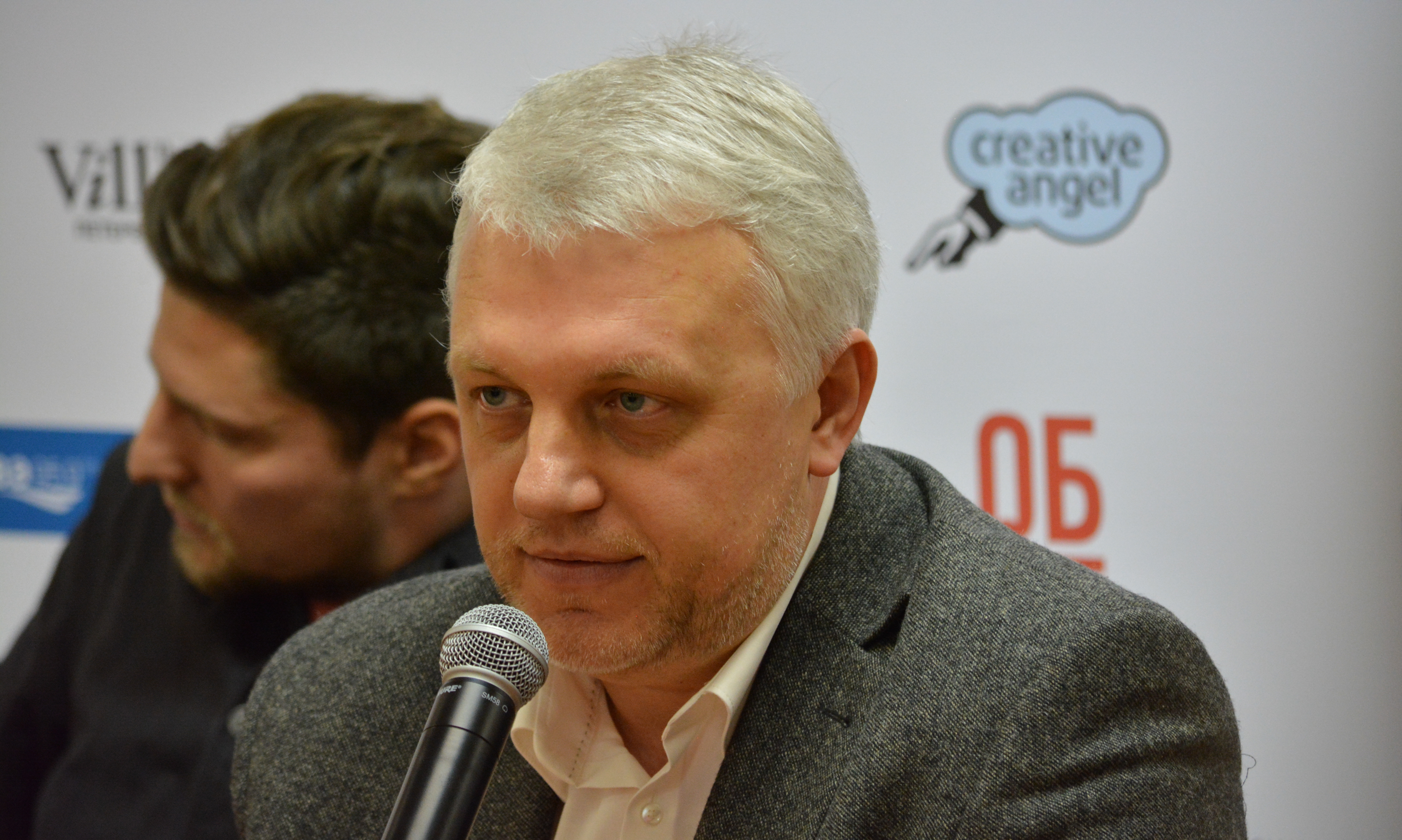
Pavel Sheremet (2014)

In the fall of 2014, Serhii Leshchenko and Mustafa Nayyem announced their participation in parliamentary elections and were elected to the Verkhovna Rada as members of the Petro Poroshenko Bloc. At the invitation of Olena Prytula, Sevhil Musaieva became the editor-in-chief of Ukrainska Pravda in October 2014. Before this, she had led the editorial team of Hubs, an online publication she founded. Prytula remained the owner of Ukrainska Pravda and continued to oversee the outlet's strategic direction. During this period, journalist Pavel Sheremet also joined the publication, taking on the role of executive director.

In February 2015, the teams of Ukrainska Pravda, Hromadske TV, and the NGO Center UA launched a joint coworking space called MediaHub. It was located in a building owned by Kyivmiskbud in Kyiv's Pechersk district, with businessman Kostiantyn Hryhoryshyn serving as the landlord. In June 2015, Ukrainska Pravda established a journalism school, with Pavlo Sheremet as its director. In July 2016, Sheremet was killed in a car explosion while driving a vehicle owned by Olena Prytula. Investigators considered an assassination attempt on Prytula as one of the possible motives. In February 2018, Prytula addressed Prosecutor General Yurii Lutsenko, demanding that Sheremet's murder be investigated as an act of terrorism.

Since 2016, Roman Kravets and Roman Romaniuk have been the chief political analysts at Ukrainska Pravda. In August 2016, the editorial team of Yevropeiska Pravda (European Pravda) and the editorial board of Ukrainska Pravda appealed to the governments of European Union countries, urging them not to introduce a visa-free regime or provide financial assistance to Ukraine, citing the Ukrainian authorities' "falsification of reforms" as their reasoning. In July 2017, the editorial teams of Ukrainska Pravda, Yevropeiska Pravda, Ekonomichna Pravda, and UP.Zhyttia criticized President Petro Poroshenko's decision to revoke Mikheil Saakashvili's Ukrainian citizenship. In June 2019, the media outlet theБабель reported that newly elected President Volodymyr Zelenskyy had offered Ukrainska Pravda's editor-in-chief, Sevhil Musaieva, the position of his press secretary while the competition for the role was still ongoing. Musaieva neither confirmed nor denied the report.

=== Heorhii Gongadze Prize ===
In 2019, PEN Ukraine, in partnership with the powered KMBS Alumni platform and Ukrainska Pravda, established an award for independent journalists. It is presented annually on May 21, the birthday of Heorhii Gongadze.

=== 2020–2021 ===
==== Website Redesign ====
On April 30, 2020, Ukrainska Pravda introduced a redesigned website. The new design emphasized the daily news landscape, in-depth analytical articles, and opinion columns.

==== UP Club ====
On June 18, 2020, Ukrainska Pravda launched the Ukrainska Pravda Readers' Club, offering readers the opportunity to financially support the publication. Membership costs 55 UAH per month or 500 UAH per year.

Funds from readers are used for the development of Ukrainska Pravda, the creation of new projects, documentary films, and investigative journalism. All content on the website remains freely accessible to everyone.

Club members are offered: • Access to Ukrainska Pravda's exclusive events • Meetings with journalists • Opportunity to suggest topics for articles • Editorial newsletters exclusively for club members

===== UP Toloka =====
On September 30, 2020, a new membership tier called "UP Toloka" was introduced. The cost of participation in Toloka starts at 125 UAH per month or 1,000 UAH per year.

In addition to standard membership perks, Toloka subscribers receive exclusive discounts and bonus offers from Ukrainska Pravda's partner companies.

===== Editor's Club =====
The highest membership tier in the UP Club is Editor's Club. To join, members must contribute $1,250 per year. Access to this level is granted only by special recommendation or editorial selection. Editor's Club members are offered access to regular closed events with Ukrainska Pravda's leadership, as well as access to a private Slack channel.

==== Documentary Films ====
On December 15, 2020, Ukrainska Pravda released a documentary film about Ukraine's anti-corruption infrastructure, titled "Red Line Corruption". The publication stated that this film was the first in a documentary series by Ukrainska Pravda dedicated to the most pressing issues and challenges facing Ukrainian society.

==== Ukrainska Pravda Award ====
To mark its 20th anniversary, Ukrainska Pravda established an award featuring eight categories: "Journalist of the Year", "For Active Civic Engagement", "Volunteer of the Year", "Social Project of the Year", "Artist of the Year", "Inspiration of the Year", "Innovator of the Year"

==== Change of Ownership ====
In May 2021, Ukrainska Pravda's founding editor Olena Prytula and Dragon Capital CEO Tomáš Fiala signed an agreement transferring 100% of the publication's corporate rights and all its assets to the Dragon Capital group of companies.

Both parties agreed that the editorial policy and operational approach would remain unchanged. The Ukrainska Pravda team, led by editor-in-chief Sevhil Musaieva, would continue working as before, maintaining close collaboration with Olena Prytula, who would retain her role as founding editor.

In a letter to Ukrainska Pravda readers, Olena Prytula stated that from the proceeds of the sale, $100,000 each would be given to the two daughters of Heorhii Gongadze, and $250,000 would be allocated for scholarships named after Pavlo Sheremet, supporting students and young journalists. She also confirmed that she would continue working at the publication for the next two years.

== Subsidiary projects and partners ==
=== Current Projects ===
- Ukrainska Pravda (pravda.com.ua Archived on April 17, 2007 in the Wayback Machine) – The oldest project of the media group, focused on politics, founded in April 2000. It includes several subdivisions, including a podcast section launched in 2019.
- Ekonomichna Pravda (epravda.com.ua Archived on April 3, 2022 in the Wayback Machine]) – A project dedicated to business and economics, founded in 2006.
- Ukrainska Pravda. Zhyttia (life.pravda.com.ua Archived on April 2, 2022 in the Wayback Machine]) – A lifestyle project, established in 2007.
- TabloID (tabloid.com.ua Archived on July 5, 2008 in the Wayback Machine]) – A project covering show business and celebrity life, launched in September 2005.
- Ukrainska Pravda – Forum (forum.pravda.com.ua Archived on April 2, 2022 in the Wayback Machine]) – A political discussion forum that started in 2005.
- Ukrainska Pravda – Blogs (blogs.pravda.com.ua Archived on August 17, 2007 in the Wayback Machine]) – A blogging platform launched in 2007, featuring journalists, politicians, writers, athletes, and more.
- Dostup do Pravdy (dostup.pravda.com.ua Archived on November 11, 2019 in the Wayback Machine]) – A project dedicated to public data access, launched on the Ukrainska Pravda platform in 2014

=== Former Projects ===
- Champion (champion.com.ua Archived on November 15, 2020 in the Wayback Machine) – A sports publication founded in the fall of 2000. Closed in August 2017 due to low efficiency and sold in October to sports journalist Dmytro Kopiy.
- Ukrainska Pravda – Kyiv (kiev.pravda.com.ua Archived on April 3, 2022 in the Wayback Machine]) – A news site covering the capital, launched in 2008. It stopped updating in 2017.
- BZH (bzh.life Archived on November 15, 2020 in the Wayback Machine]) – A website covering cultural events in Kyiv, Odesa, and Lviv. Launched in July 2015 and sold to the Czech company Accord Group in December 2018.
- UP.Kultura – A separate project within UP.Zhyttia, with its own editor and authors. Launched in September 2015, but in October 2017, it was decided that the "Culture" section would no longer have a dedicated team and would instead be managed by the UP.Zhyttia editorial staff.
- Narodni Blogy (narodna.pravda.com.ua Archived on April 1, 2022 in the Wayback Machine]) – A citizen journalism platform created in 2007, which ceased updates in February 2021.
- Ukrainska Pravda SOS (sos.pravda.com.ua Archived on November 1, 2020 in the Wayback Machine]) – A platform dedicated to COVID-19 and its consequences, launched in May 2020. It stopped being updated in September 2020.

=== Partners ===
- Partners of Ukrainska Pravda that are not financially linked to the publication, nor connected through ownership or management structures:
- Istorychna Pravda (istpravda.com.ua Archived on April 3, 2022 in the Wayback Machine) – A socio-historical publication established in 2010.
- Yevropeiska Pravda (eurointegration.com.ua Archived on March 25, 2020 in the Wayback Machine]) – A news resource focused on European affairs, founded in 2014.

== Revenue and staff ==
In 2005, Ukrainska Pravda became self-sustaining, generating revenue primarily from advertising. By 2010, advertising accounted for 98% of the publication's budget. The entire Ukrainska Pravda network employed around 30 people, including IT specialists and an advertising manager, with six editors working in the newsroom.

By 2016, advertising made up 95% of revenue, while grants contributed 5%. The publication worked with approximately 40 people, including 15 at Ukrainska Pravda, 6 at Ekonomichna Pravda, around 10 at Yevropeiska Pravda, 2 at Istorychna Pravda, 5 at UP.Zhyttia (including UP.Kultura), 3 each at TabloID and BZH, and 1 at up Kyiv.

As of 2020, native and banner advertising accounted for over 80% of Ukrainska Pravda's revenue. In June 2020, the publication launched the Readers' Club, a paid membership platform aimed at fostering community engagement, feedback, networking, and media development. The goal was for the club to cover 30% of the publication's expenses within five years. As of December 4, 2020, reader contributions accounted for 10% of Ukrainska Pravda's budget.

== Ratings ==
=== Popularity ===
According to Gemius data from October 2015, Ukrainska Pravda ranked third among Ukrainian news websites, trailing only Obozrevatel and Censor.net. That month, the site recorded 56 million page views. In 2017, Ukrainska Pravda was among the top ten most-cited sources in the Ukrainian Wikipedia

In April 2019, the website ranked 5th in the Top 100 news websites in Ukraine for socio-political content, according to a ranking published by the Internet Association of Ukraine. According to SimilarWeb, between May and August 2020, Ukrainska Pravda held the top position for the most page views among Ukrainian online media. As per Alexa statistics, the publication's website was among the top 50 most-visited websites in Ukraine (ranking 29th as of November 15, 2020).

=== Assessments ===
The publication played a crucial role in informing the public during the Orange Revolution of 2004 and was a stronghold of Ukrainian investigative journalism between 2007 and 2010. The Institute of Mass Information (IMI) ranked Ukrainska Pravda among the leaders in adherence to journalistic standards among Ukrainian online media from 2015 to 2017.

At the same time, some of Ukrainska Pravda's publications have been criticized for violating journalistic standards. The Journalistic Ethics Commission noted that certain articles breached specific points of the Ukrainian Journalists' Code of Ethics.

According to the Institute of Mass Information, in 2020, Ukrainska Pravda was included in the "white list" of Ukrainian media, which consists of outlets maintaining an information accuracy level of over 95%.

In a Ukrainian anti-ranking of news outlets by IMI and Texty.org.ua, Ukrainska Pravda ranked 44th out of 50. The analysis identified 98 questionable news articles, one article sourced from unreliable information, and one false news report. The study was conducted as part of the "Development of Responsible Online Media" project, supported by the Ministry of Foreign Affairs of the Czech Republic between June and August 2018.

In September 2019, Ukrainska Pravda was included in the Institute of Mass Information (IMI) rankings as a popular news site showing an average level of transparency. The study, conducted with support from the Media Development Fund of the U.S. Embassy in Ukraine, analyzed the 50 most popular news websites in the Ukrainian internet segment, based on SimilarWeb.

In April 2020, Ukrainska Pravda ranked second among the highest-quality media in terms of adherence to professional standards, according to a study by the Institute of Mass Information. The research found that the publication maintained a 97.5% compliance rate with professional journalism standards. The vast majority of its news articles were written without any violations of journalistic ethics. The balance of viewpoints and separation of facts from commentary was upheld in 99% of articles, while accuracy standards were followed in 99.5% of cases.

In March 2022, the Institute of Mass Information recommended Ukrainska Pravda as a reliable and trustworthy media outlet.

== Awards ==
In May 2006, Ukrainska Pravda received the Gerd Bucerius Free Press of Eastern Europe Award. In October 2017, Ukrainska Pravda was one of four Ukrainian publications awarded the Andrei Sakharov Prize "For Journalism as an Act of Conscience", presented in Russia.

In May 2021, Ukrainska Pravda journalist Roman Kravets won the "Best Interview" category in the Honor of the Profession professional journalism competition for his interview with Ukrainian President Volodymyr Zelenskyy.

== Scandals and criticism ==
=== Regarding the Sternenko Case ===
In June 2020, Ukrainian activist Serhii Sternenko accused Ukrainska Pravda journalist Sonia Lukashova of attempting to deceive his lawyers into providing a copy of procedural documents. As a result, Ukrainska Pravda published an article titled "The Indictment of the Year: Explaining the Investigation's Version of the Sternenko Case", which presented the perspectives of the prosecution and the lawyer representing Sternenko's opponents, but did not include the position of his defense team. In response, Sternenko publicly urged readers to "be cautious when engaging with the publication". At the time, Ukrainska Pravda's owner Olena Prytula replied to Sternenko, stating, "every sentence is either inaccurate, misleading, or outright slander".

=== Regarding the "Unfit for duty" Abroad Investigation ===
On May 14, 2024, the Kyiv City Prosecutor's Office launched a criminal investigation following a complaint from Ukrainska Pravda journalists regarding attempts at pressure, threats, and obstruction of journalistic activities. The pre-trial investigation is being conducted under Part 2 of Article 171 of the Criminal Code of Ukraine ("Influencing a journalist to obstruct their professional duties") and Part 1 of Article 345-1 ("Threats of murder or violence against a journalist in connection with their lawful professional activities"). The case relates to Ukrainska Pravda's investigative report "Unfit for duty", which exposed a group of young men who regularly travel abroad despite being militarily obligated. According to reports, on May 10, 2024, Ukrainska Pravda's head of investigations, Mykhailo Tkach, received a message via a messaging app from someone identifying themselves as Oleksandr Slobozhenko, a subject of the investigation. The sender proposed that the journalist "settle the matter" in exchange for financial compensation. The message ended with the words: "I wouldn't recommend delaying your response. I also know how to fight." Following this, Tkach began receiving dozens of phone calls from unknown numbers, as well as SMS messages containing authorization codes from banks and credit institutions. Additionally, on May 13, 2024, at least ten Ukrainska Pravda employees received threatening emails. The Shevchenkivskyi District Police Department is handling the investigation, which remains under prosecutorial supervision.

=== Pressure from the President's Office ===
On October 9, 2024, Ukrainska Pravda issued a statement alleging systematic pressure from the Office of the President of Ukraine. The statement listed and described several methods of harassment, including:

- Blocking government representatives from communicating with Ukrainska Pravda journalists or participating in their events.
- Pressuring businesses to halt advertising partnerships with Ukrainska Pravda.
- A confrontational and emotional exchange between President Volodymyr Zelenskyy and Ukrainska Pravda journalist Roman Kravets, broadcast live.

The publication called on the international community and all supporters of press freedom and independent journalism to unite in defending these principles.

== See also ==
- List of newspapers in Ukraine
