= Olena Prytula =

Ukrainian journalist (born 1967)

- Олена Притула
- Born: March 10, 1967 (age 58); Zavolzhye, Russian SFSR, Soviet Union
- Notable credit(s): Ukrainska Pravda co-founder (2000-2014), Knight Fellow at Stanford University

Olena Yuriivna Prytula (Ukrainian: Олена Юріївна Притула; Russian: Алёна Юрьевна Притула, romanized: Alyona Yuryevna Pritula; born March 10, 1967) is a Ukrainian journalist, the former editor-in-chief, owner (and earlier co-founder) of the Ukrainska Pravda, an influential online newspaper that focuses on news and political coverage in Ukraine.

== Early life ==
Born in Zavolzhye, Gorky Oblast, Prytula with her parents moved to the city of Izmail on the Danube in Ukraine. She was educated as an engineer in electroacoustics and ultrasound at Odesa Polytechnic Institute. Influenced by the dramatic social changes in the Soviet Union, Prytula quit her engineering career and became a journalist. She began her journalism career as a correspondent of UNIAR news agency, later working as a stringer for Reuters in Crimea, correspondent for Interfax-Ukraine news agency in Kyiv and Crimea.

== Ukrainska Pravda and Gongadze ==
In 2000, Prytula became one of the founders of Ukrainska Pravda. The murder of the site's co-founder, journalist Georgiy Gongadze, who had openly protested against growing government censorship, focused attention on freedom of speech issues in Ukraine.

Prytula has also been a mistress of married Gongadze. She never stated it publicly but repeatedly mentioned her deep personal ties to him after his death. She was the very same "friend" of Gongadze whose apartment he left just before he was last seen alive. Olena Prytula was featured in a PBS FRONTLINE World story in October 2005, "A Murder in Kyiv," that investigated the killing of Gongadze and her efforts to keep the paper going that they co-founded.

Since 2013 Prytula was the partner of a married Belarusian journalist Pavel Sheremet. On July 20, 2016, after leaving her apartment, he was blown up in her car.

Prytula returned to Ukraine in 2004 after her fellowship year at Stanford, where she was a Lyle and Corrine Nelson International Journalism Fellow, studying Internet-based communications and new media technologies.

Soon after her return, Ukraine witnessed the Orange Revolution during which Prytula's site played a pivotal role in providing timely information to the public in an atmosphere of upheaval and press restrictions.

In the 2000s (decade), Prytula complemented Ukrainska Pravda with news sites dedicated to economy, lifestyle, local news and tabloid, creating an integrated Internet-media group.

Russian-speaking Prytula insists that her news sites' home pages should remain in Ukrainian language, although translated Russian version is also provided. Earlier available English-translated version is discontinued and put offline.

In May 2021 owner Prytula sold 100% of the corporate rights of Ukrainska Pravda to Dragon Capital. The parties agreed that the editorial policy of the newspaper would remain unchanged. According to Dragon Capital the investment was "another step towards supporting free media and freedom of speech in Ukraine." Prytula intends to leave Ukrainska Pravda in 2023.
