= Independence Day of Ukraine =

Main state holiday in modern Ukraine

Independence Day of Ukraine День Незалежності України
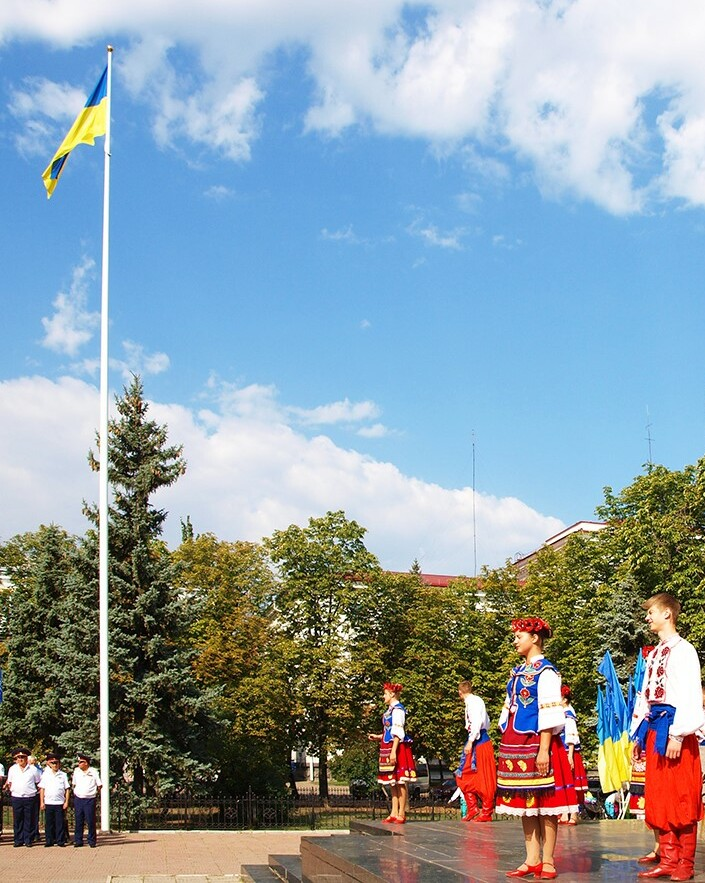
- 2013 celebration in Luhansk, the last before the war in Donbas started in 2014.
- Observed by: Ukraine
- Type: National
- Significance: The day the Declaration of Independence was proclaimed by the Verkhovna Rada in 1991
- Celebrations: Fireworks, concerts, parades, military parade
- Date: 24 August
- Frequency: Annual
- First time: 1991
- Started by: Verkhovna Rada

Independence Day of Ukraine (Ukrainian: День Незалежності України, romanized: Den' Nezalezhnosti Ukrainy, IPA: [ˈdɛnʲ nezɐˈlɛʒnos⁽ʲ⁾t⁽ʲ⁾i ʊkrɐˈjinɪ]) is a state holiday in Ukraine, (Note: In July 2013 in a poll by Razumkov Centre 61% considered Independence Day a holiday, 30.4% "not a holiday, but an ordinary day off" and 6.1% agreed to "this should be a working day".) celebrated on 24 August in commemoration of the Declaration of Independence of 1991.

== History ==
When Ukraine was still a Soviet republic, the Ukrainian diaspora traditionally recognized 22 January (the Declaration of Independence of the Ukrainian People's Republic in 1918) as Ukrainian Independence day.

The current form of the holiday was first celebrated on 16 July 1991, as the first anniversary of the Declaration of State Sovereignty of Ukraine passed by the Verkhovna Rada (Ukraine's parliament) in 1990. Since the Declaration of Independence was issued on 24 August 1991, and confirmed by the referendum of 1 December 1991, the date of the holiday was changed.

=== Legal framework (1990–1992) ===
On 16 July 1990, the Verkhovna Rada of the Ukrainian SSR adopted the Declaration of State Sovereignty of Ukraine, which initially led to 16 July being designated as Independence Day in Ukrainian law. After the Act of Declaration of Independence was proclaimed on 24 August 1991 and confirmed by the nationwide referendum on 1 December 1991, the holiday's date was moved to 24 August by a subsequent parliamentary decision in 1992.

== Traditions ==
In 2013 the holiday was not particularly popular amongst the Ukrainian audience, in fact it was one of the least popular of the public holidays of Ukraine – only 12% considered it important or favorite. In 2021 this figure had grown to 37%.

The Russian invasion of Ukraine that continued on 24 February 2022, led to a reappraisal of the popularity of Independence Day in Ukraine. A March 2024 study by the Kyiv International Institute of Sociology found that the popularity of Independence Day of Ukraine and Defenders Day had both almost more than doubled (from 37% to 64% and from 29% to 58%).

=== Public opinion ===
Public perception of Independence Day in Ukraine has shifted significantly over the decades. In a 2013 poll by the Razumkov Centre, 61% of respondents considered it a holiday, 30.4% saw it as "not a holiday, but an ordinary day off", and 6.1% believed it should be a working day. By 2021, a Kyiv International Institute of Sociology (KIIS) survey found that 37% of Ukrainians considered Independence Day their favourite or one of their favourite holidays. Following the full-scale Russian invasion in 2022, the same KIIS study in March 2024 recorded a sharp rise in popularity — 64% named it among their favourite holidays, alongside Defenders Day (58%).

=== National Flag Day ===
Beginning in 2004, 23 August is celebrated as National Flag Day.

=== Parade ===
Generally, but not every year, independence day is celebrated with a military parade held in Kyiv, the capital of Ukraine. In 2021, a military parade was held on the occasion of the 30th anniversary of Ukraine's Independence. Since the Russian invasion of Ukraine in 2022, no military parade has taken place. However, to mark the 2023 Independence Day, destroyed Russian tanks and military vehicles were lined up in central Kyiv.

== Celebrations ==
=== Chronology ===
Year	Location(s)	Notable features	Sources
1997	Kyiv (Chaika Airfield)	Large-scale aviation show with UAF flypast; attended by President Leonid Kuchma	
2006	Nationwide	National mourning shifted main events to 26 August after Pulkovo Flight 612 crash	
2021	Kyiv / Odesa	30th anniversary; >5,000 troops, 400 vehicles; multinational participation; Air Force flypast	
2023	Kyiv	Static display of destroyed Russian armour on Khreshchatyk under martial law	

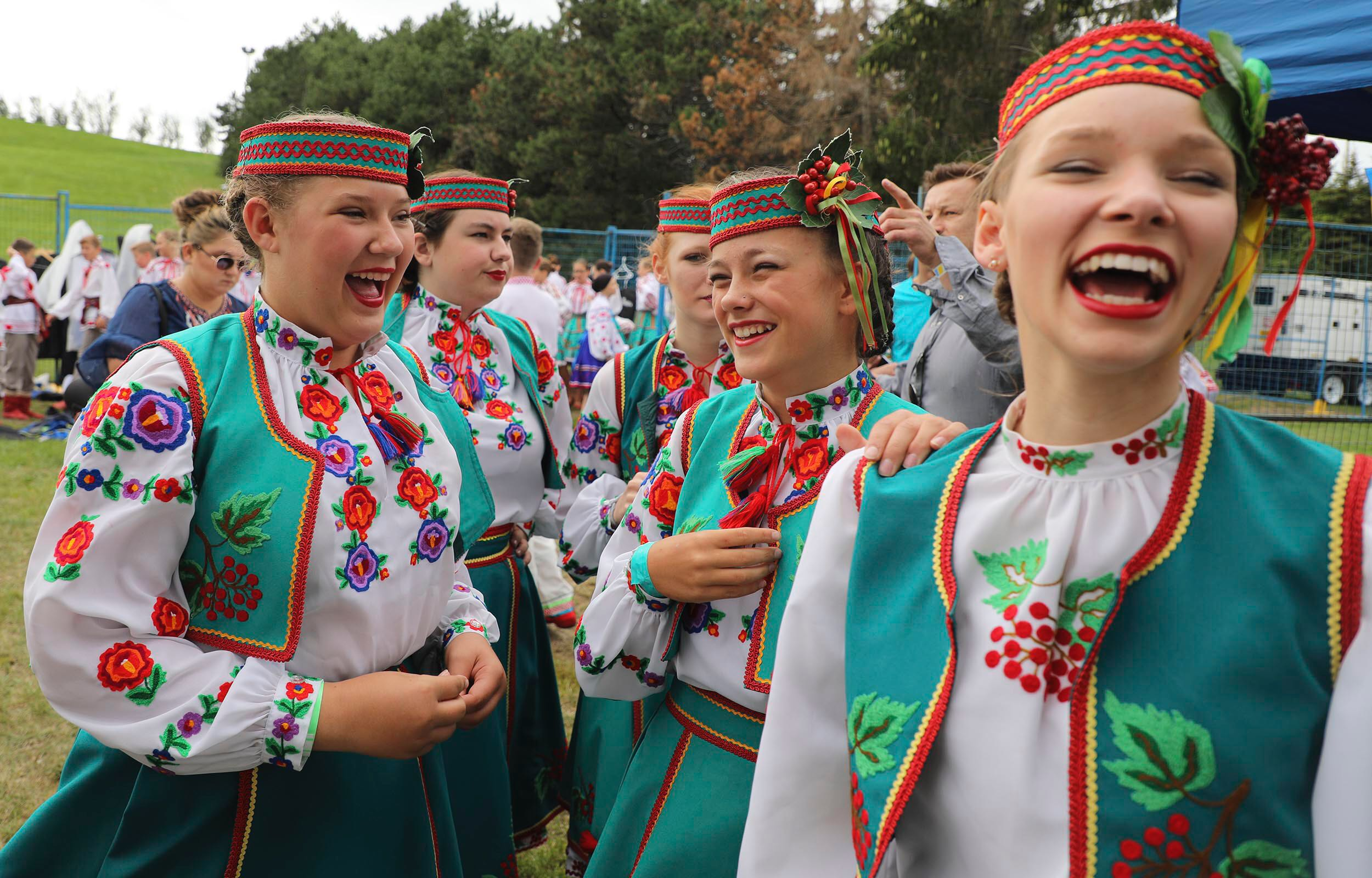
Ukrainian Independence Day celebrations in Toronto, Canada in 2017

=== 1997 ===
The Chayka Aviation Parade was a large-scale aviation show dedicated to Independence Day that took place at Kyiv Chaika Airfield in 1997. It featured flypasts by personnel of the Ukrainian Air Force. The parade was attended by President of Ukraine Leonid Kuchma and Minister of Defense Oleksandr Kuzmuk.

=== 2006 ===
National celebrations of Ukraine's 15th Independence Day was postponed from 24 August to 26 August, as a three-day period of mourning was held following the deadly crash of Pulkovo Aviation Enterprise Flight 612 that occurred 22 August 2006. The crash in Donetsk Oblast killed 170, and was the deadliest aircraft incident in Ukraine until Malaysia Airlines Flight 17 in 2014.

=== 2016 ===
After the annual military parade in Kyiv the "March of the Unconquered" was held by active members of Ukraine's volunteer battalions, relatives of those killed during the fighting in the Russo-Ukrainian War and family members of those killed during the Euromaidan uprising – known in Ukraine as the "Heavenly Hundred". According to the Ukrainian army the volume of artillery fire set off by the separatist forces of the war in Donbas during the 24-hour period of 24 August 2016 was the highest since the February 2015 Battle of Debaltseve.

Several Ukrainian cities held marches of people dressed in vyshyvanky (shirts with traditional Ukrainian embroidery).

=== 2019 ===
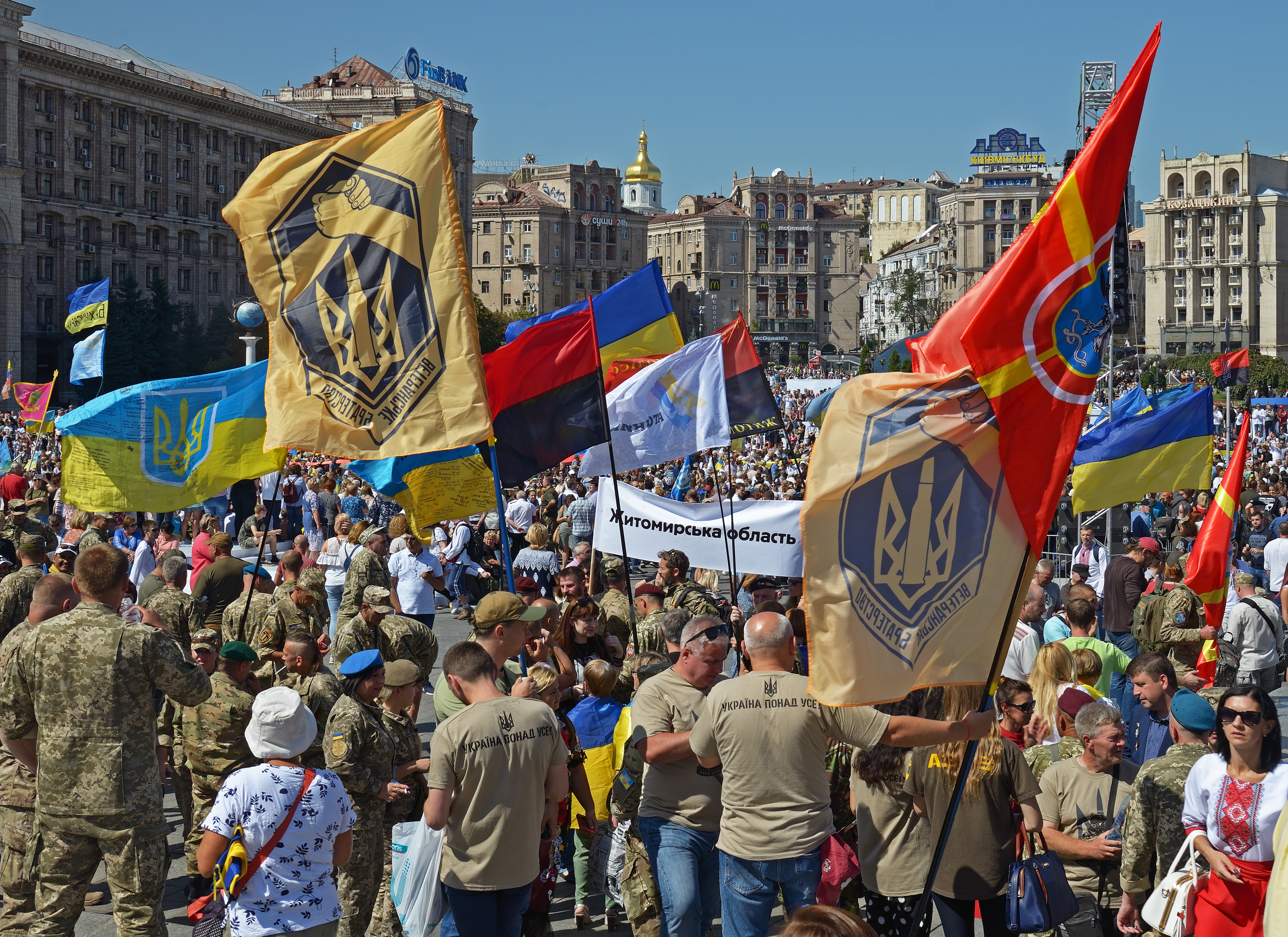
The March of Defenders during independence day 2019, featuring the UPA battle flag.

On 10 July 2019, President Volodymyr Zelenskyy announced on Facebook that the 2019 Ukrainian Independence Day celebrations will not include a military parade (for the first time since the parade's cancellation from 2010 to 2014) stating the following: "We have decided to allocate 300 mln hryvnias [nearly $12 mln] as bonus payments to our servicemen, i.e. fixed-term soldiers, cadets, sergeants, officers." Zelenskyy also mentioned that the government would take steps to "honor heroes" on Independence Day by highlighting the fact that the "format will be new". On 30 July, Zelenskyy's Head of the Presidential Administration Andriy Bohdan announced that a March of Dignity (Марш гідності) will take place in replacement of the annual parade. A separate march, known as the March of Defenders (Марш захисників) was also planned to be held by Ukrainian war veterans. The ceremony went on as planned and even incorporated elements of the annual parade such as the flag raising ceremony and the awarding of veterans. During his speech, Zelenskyy called for unity, saying "Ukrainian-speaking and Russian-speaking, regardless of age, gender, religion – we must be one people".

=== 2020 ===
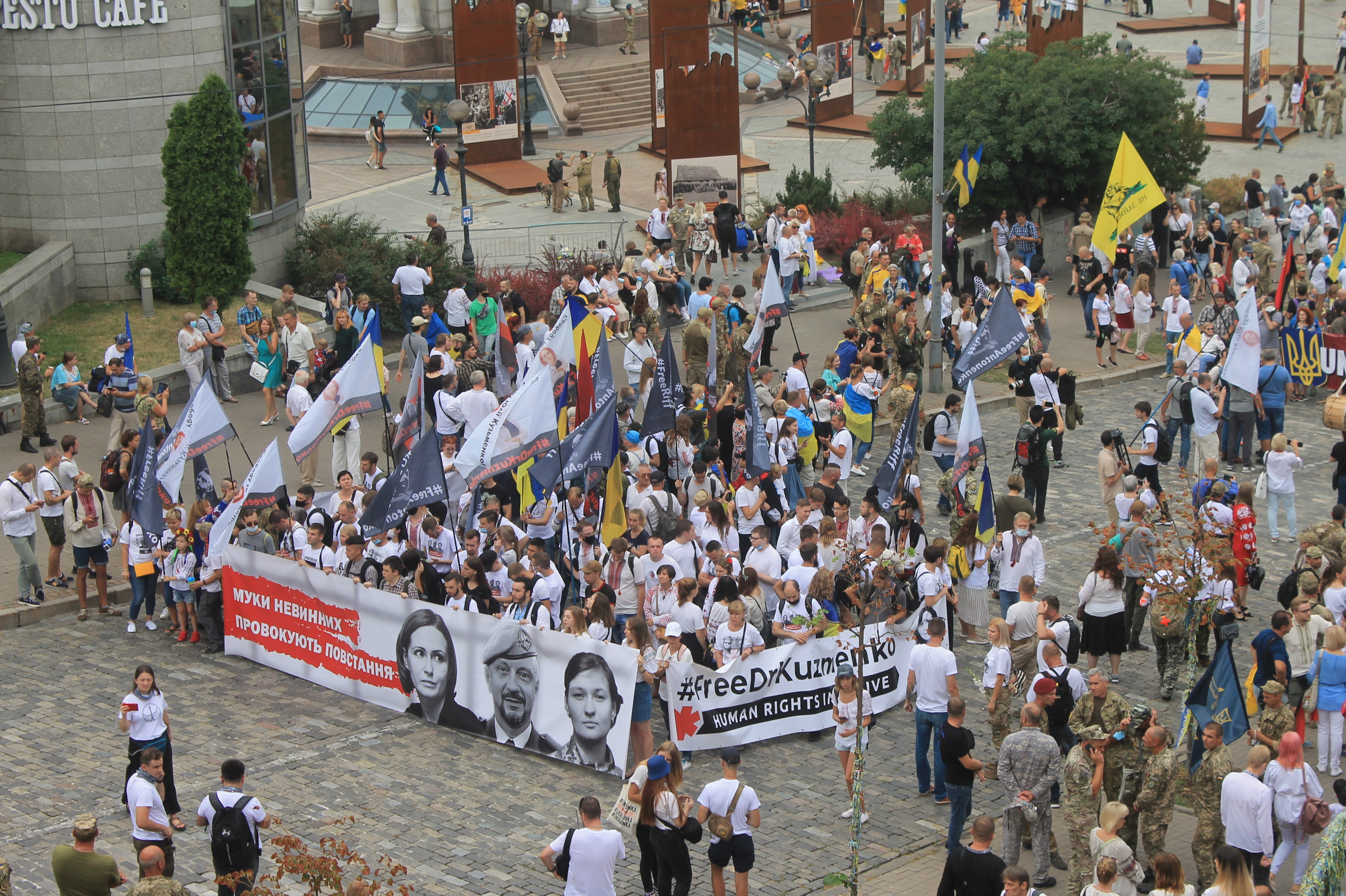
Protestors against the arrests in December 2019 of Donbas veterans suspected of killing journalist Pavel Sheremet during the 2020 March of Defenders

In an Independence Day speech in 2020 President Zelenskyy said that there would never be military equipment on parade in Kyiv as long as the war in Donbas is ongoing, during which he said that it is "Where it is needed now." Zelenskyy stated that military parades would be held in the future "a parade of Ukrainian victory, when we will return all our people and all our territories."

The joint concert of Ukrainian stars following the ceremony was marked by scandal because various artists performing in it had continued to perform and/or accept awards in Russia, despite the Ukrainian Autonomous Republic of Crimea being annexed by Russia in 2014 and the alleged support of Russia for the separatist forces of the war in Donbas. It was also condemned that this concert took place during the March of Defenders (Марш захисників) commemorating the victims of the war in Donbas.

In an English language Independence Day address, Zelenskyy launched an information campaign to restart the Ukraine NOW brand.

=== 2021 ===
In 2021, Ukraine celebrated the 30th anniversary of its independence with three days of events. A company from Lviv developed a special 30th Anniversary logo and a new award known as the "National Legend" was announced, to be presented in a ceremony on 22 August. It was also announced that the first Summit of the Crimean Platform would take place on 23 August. A number of foreign leaders were invited to the 30th anniversary celebrations, including US president Joe Biden, Greek president Katerina Sakellaropoulou, Lithuanian president Gitanas Nausėda and Moldovan president Maia Sandu.

On 24 August a large military parade made its way through Kyiv past Maidan Nezalezhnosti, featuring Ukrainian Ground Forces, Special Operations Forces, and visiting units from several foreign armed forces. The parade included more than 5000 troops and 400 tanks and armoured vehicles. The event also included a fly-by of Ukrainian Air Force units over Kyiv. Simultaneously, Ukrainian Navy units were shown carrying out exercises at Odesa. Visiting troops from Slovenia, Moldova, Poland, the United States of America and Canada marched with Ukrainian forces, and two British Royal Air Force Eurofighter Typhoons took part in the fly-by alongside four F-16 Fighting Falcons.

Delegates from 46 countries attended, including Polish President Andrzej Duda, Lithuanian President Gitanas Nauseda and French Foreign Minister Jean-Yves Le Drian, and Eastern Orthodox Church patriarch Bartholomew I of Constantinople.

Immediately prior to the parade, President Zelenskyy addressed the crowd, calling for closer relationships with other ex-Soviet countries, European nations, and NATO.

=== 2022 ===
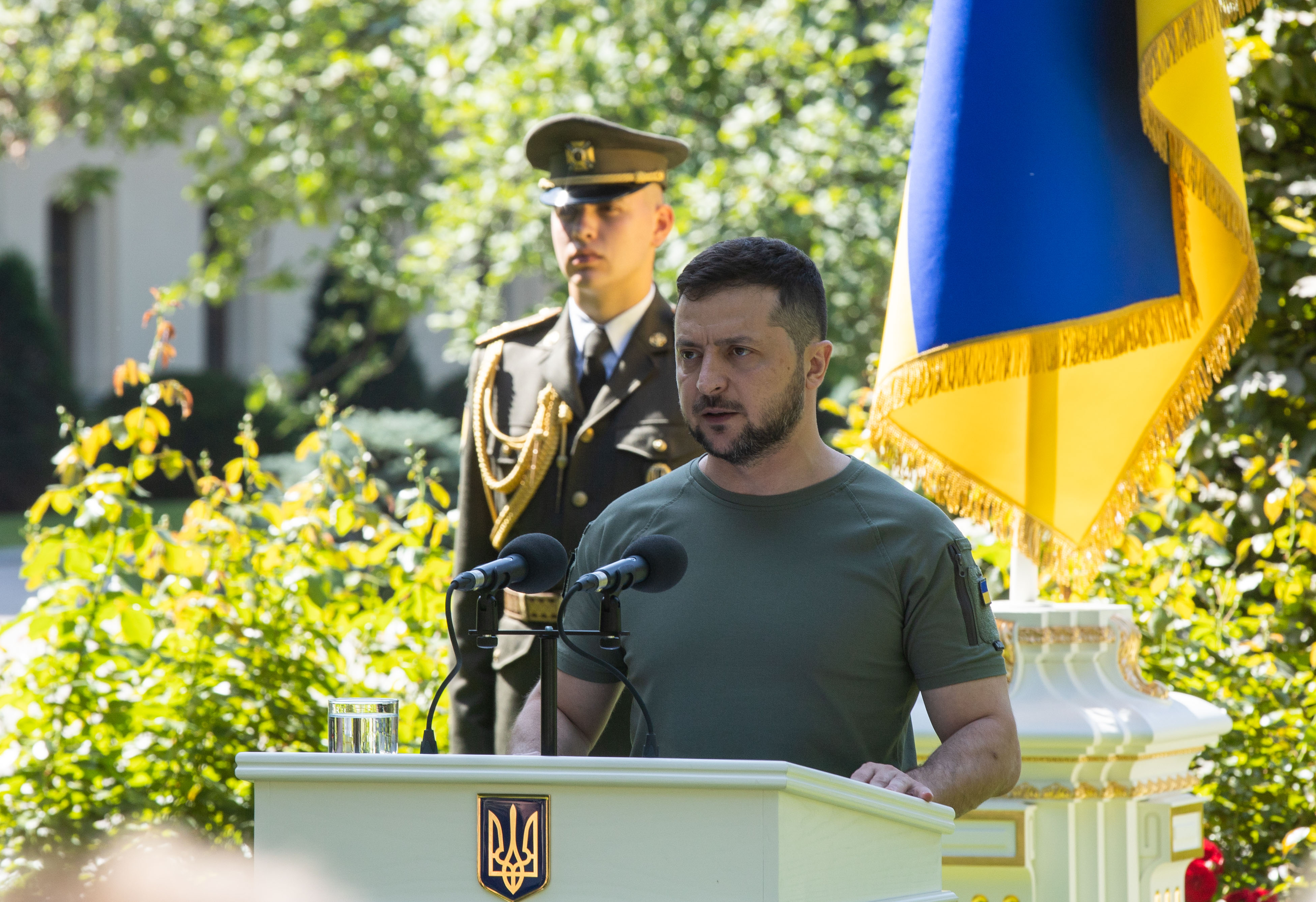
President Volodymyr Zelenskyy speaking on Independence Day 2022.

Independence Day in 2022 marked the sixth month since the invasion of Ukraine by Russia began. Celebration of the holiday was restricted within war-torn Ukraine under martial law, but large scale celebration of Ukraine's Independence was held internationally in support of the country.

==== In Ukraine ====
Ukraine's Culture Ministry confirmed there would not be any public celebration to mark the holiday. Officials warned civilians against gathering in major cities, with President Zelenskyy stating "Russia may try to do something particularly nasty, something particularly cruel." Russia would attack on the day of anniversary, shelling a civilian train in Chaplyne, Dnipropetrovsk Oblast, killing 25. The Russian defense ministry claimed it had targeted a military train using a single Iskander missile, and that the attack had successfully killed 200 Ukrainian soldiers.

In Kyiv, the Kyiv Independence Day Parade was cancelled for its tenth time as resources were directed to the war effort. Kyiv City Hall stated online "This year Ukraine celebrates the anniversary of independence in terms of martial law and under the threat of possible shelling. Mass events are prohibited, because the enemy is unpredictable, so we have to be prepared for any scenario." In place of a parade, numerous Russian military vehicles and artilleries destroyed by Ukrainian troops were displayed along Khreshchatyk, where Zelenskyy issued a speech commemorating the anniversary and advocating for Ukrainian victory. Several civilians further defaced the remains with graffiti condemning Russia (namely Vladimir Putin) and calling for justice for devastated cities such as the Russian-occupied Mariupol. A drone carrying a large Flag of Ukraine was also flown around the Motherland Monument.

==== International ====
From Belarus, President Alexander Lukashenko (an ardent supporter of Russia) acknowledged Ukraine's independence, stating "[he] wishes Ukrainians peaceful skies, tolerance, courage, strength and success in restoring a decent life." President Zelenskyy's top advisor Mykhailo Podolyak rejected the congratulatory message, calling it cynical and disingenuous given Belarus' heavy involvement in the attacks of Ukraine, and that "this blood-soaked clowning is recorded and will have consequences."

In Belgium, supporters and refugees of Ukraine gathered in the capital of Brussels, host to around 30% of the country's estimated 78,000 Ukrainian refugees. At the Grand-Place, the Manneken Pis was dressed in "traditional Kozak costume" and a large Flag of Ukraine was unfurled. European Commission President Ursula von der Leyen attended wearing Ukrainian colors.

In the Czech Republic, hundreds of people gathered in Prague at the Wenceslas Square (New Town), and Old Town Square (Old Town). In addition to support of Ukraine and its Azov Regiment, the demonstration saw extensive anti-Russian sentiment, with signings being made for a petition calling on the parliament of the Czech Republic to declare Russia a terrorist state. Similar demonstrations were also held in Brno's Moravian and Jakubske Squares.

In Greece, a parade was held in Athens. The Hellenic Ministry of Foreign Affairs issued a statement to reaffirm Greece's solidarity with Ukraine, whose sovereignty and independence is recognized.

In Germany, a parade was held in Berlin, where a candlelight vigil was set up in front of the Brandenburg Gate. Chancellor Olaf Scholz assured support, stating that Germany "stands firmly by the side of the threatened Ukraine today and for as long as Ukraine needs our support," and rebuked the Kremlin for its "backward imperialism".

In Ireland, a protest of 3,000 people against Putin and Russian violence was held in Dublin, marching 5 km from the General Post Office to the Ukrainian embassy. Ukrainian ambassador to Ireland Gerasko Larysa was in attendance. Other events were held across the country.

In Italy, Rome's Ukrainian community participated in a "march for freedom" through the city center that passed the Colosseum. Prime Minister Mario Draghi gave congratulations and continued offers of support to Ukraine.

In Malta, demonstrations were held in Valletta and Floriana. Prime Minister Robert Abela tweeted that "[Malta's] will to stay united and restore peace in Ukraine remains strong."

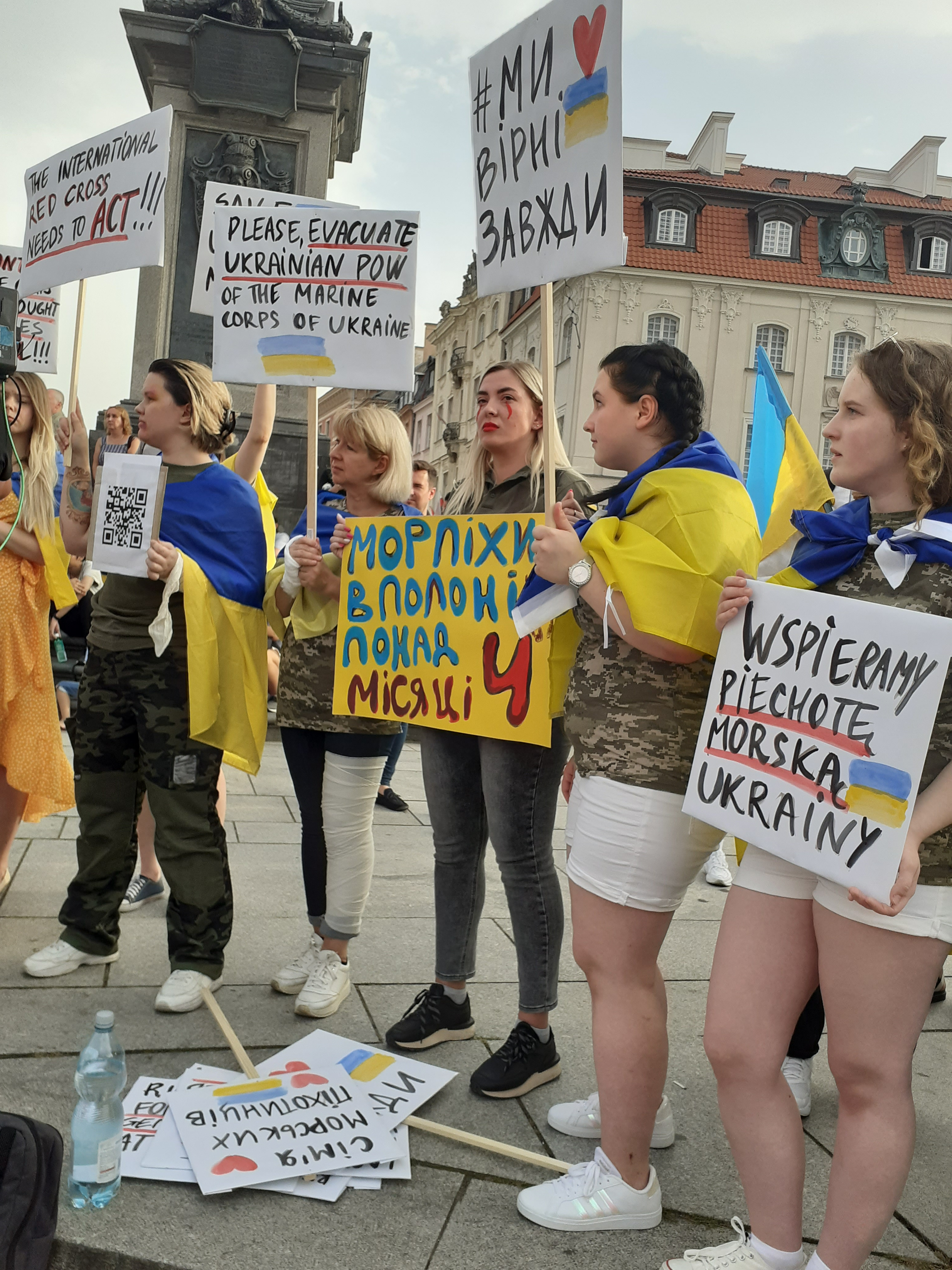
Independence Day of Ukraine in Warsaw – 2022.

In Poland, thousands of Polish citizens and Ukrainian refugees gathered in the city centers of Warsaw and Kraków in celebration and support. The Palace of Culture and Science was illuminated in Ukrainian blue and yellow. Warsaw's mayor Rafał Trzaskowski assured that "Poland is with [Ukraine], Warsaw is with [Ukraine]!" President Andrzej Duda also gave his support to Ukraine, recalling Poland as the first country in the world to have recognized Ukraine's independence.

In Portugal, a ceremony was held in Lisbon celebrating Ukraine's Independence Day, set around the city's statue of Taras Shevchenko. Portuguese Minister of Foreign Affairs João Gomes Cravinho visited the Ukrainian Minister of Foreign Affairs Dmytro Kuleba in Kyiv to further show Portugal's support.

In Turkey, a demonstration in Istanbul was held with performance of the State Anthem of Ukraine. Foreign Minister Mevlut Cavusoglu congratulated the country over Twitter on its independence from the Soviet Union. Turkish National Defense Minister Hulusi Akar promised Türkiye's continued support to Ukrainian Defence Minister Oleksii Reznikov and Infrastructure Minister Oleksandr Kubrakov.

Within the United Kingdom, Independence Day saw a significant celebration from the estimated 100,000 Ukrainian refugees in the kingdom, and parades in support of Ukraine and protests condemning Russia were both held. In England, a dedicated service was held at the York Minster in York. In London, a demonstration against the Russian invasion was held outside Downing Street. Chief Mouser to the Cabinet Office Larry was pictured in front of 10 Downing Street decorated with blue and yellow flowers (including sunflowers, one of Ukraine's floral emblems). In Scotland, hundreds in Edinburgh took part in a march on Calton Hill from the Volodomyr Velacky monument to the Holodomor plaque. Ukrainian Ambassador to the United Kingdom, Vadym Prystaiko, and his wife, Inna Prystaiko, were among the participants. According to the British Embassy Kyiv, Queen Elizabeth II congratulated Ukrainians, stating "I hope that today will be a time for the Ukrainian people, both in Ukraine and around the world, to celebrate their culture, history, and identity." Prime Minister Boris Johnson also expressed that "[Ukraine] will win" and has the United Kingdom's support. The Ministry of Defence tweeted a video of the Band of the Scots Guards performing "Stefania".

In the United States, a massive Flag of Ukraine (reportedly the world's largest) was unfurled in New York City, held by hundreds of supporters in Central Park's Sheep Meadow. President Joe Biden called the 31st anniversary's coincidence with the half-year mark of the war "bittersweet", and pledged approximately $2.98 billion USD in military aid to Ukraine's forces. Congratulations were issued by other U.S. politicians including Secretary of State Antony Blinken, NYC Mayor Eric Adams, and Massachusetts Representative Paul Tucker. Preceding Independence Day, the U.S. Embassy in Ukraine issued warnings from the United States Department of State that Russia would most likely increase attacks on civilians and infrastructure.
