= List of journalists killed in Ukraine =

A list of journalists (listed chronologically since 1991) containing the names of the mass media workers who became victims of murders or died while in Ukraine.

On 15 August 2017, the President of Ukraine Petro Poroshenko assigned the scholarships for the children of journalists who died on duty, in order to support these children and provide them with the social protection they need. In accordance with the presidential decree No. 217/2017, the scholarship will be assigned to a daughter of a captain-lieutenant and an editor of the TV services “Breeze” of the broadcasting agency of the Ministry of Defence (Ukraine) Dmytro Labutkin, - Kira; a daughter of a photojournalist of the Segodnya (Russian: Сегодня, IPA: [sʲɪˈvodʲnʲə] , lit. 'Today') newspaper Sergiy Nikolayev – Valeria; and a son of a journalist from the Vesti (Russian: Вести, "News") newspaper Vyacheslav Veremiy – Maksim.

== 1990s ==
=== 1991 ===
- Myron Lyakhovich – editor of the newspaper Life and Work (Lviv), murdered either at the end of 1991 or at the beginning of 1992, according to different information sources.

=== 1992 ===
- Vadym Boyko – journalist of the “Gart” television company (Kyiv), died on 14 February due to an explosion in his house. The circumstances of this incident are still not clear. The prosecutor's office stated that the reason of an explosion was a technical fault of the TV set, although the eyewitnesses have reportedly seen that the doors of his apartment were set on fire, while the medical examination results established the fact that his death occurred before the fire started.

=== 1993 ===
- Svyatoslav Sosnovsky – editor of the Tavria publishing house (Simferopol, Crimea), died on 29 May. He succumbed to the stab wounds inflicted near his house.
- Mykola Baklanov – staff writer of the newspaper Izvestiya (News, Kyiv), died on 22 July due to the wounds received as a result of a mob attack.
- Yury Osmanov – editor of the newspaper Areket (Simferopol), on 7 November was found dead on the streets of the city with the craniocerebral injury.
- Andriy Lazebnyk – head of the press-centre of the Black Sea Fleet (Sevastopol), on 15 December shot dead at the door of his house.

=== 1994 ===
- Sergiy Shepelev – editor of the newspaper Evening Vinnytsia (Vinnytsia), died in January in fire in his apartment. Independent experts claim that the journalist was found tied to his bed.

=== 1995 ===
- Anatoliy Taran – editor of the newspaper Obolon (Kyiv), was found dead in the wasteland in March.
- Volodymyr Ivanov – journalist of the newspaper Glory of Sevastopol (Sevastopol), died on 14 April as the result of an explosion, when a bomb placed in a trash bin went off.
- Viktor Freilikh – freelance correspondent of the newspaper Molody Bukovynets (Chernivtsi), died from poisoning by an unknown substance on 24 May, after he was being threatened due to his activities as a journalist.
- Yuriy Djedjula – journalist of the newspapers Kyiv Herald and Interesting Newspaper (Kyiv), was murdered in August.

=== 1996 ===
- Georgiy Ovcharenko – journalist of the UT-3 TV channel (“Black Square”), was found dead in his neighbor's apartment.
- Ihor Kuzyk – executive editor of the newspaper Army of Ukraine (Lviv), found dead in a park on 29 January, a few months later after his disappearance.
- Ihor Hrushetsky – correspondent of the newspaper Ukraine-Centre (Cherkasy), found on the street with the head injury on 7 May.
- Oleksandr Motrenko – host of the Saturday Express programme on “Trans-M-Radio” (Simferopol), died on 22 June as a result of a head injury when he was attacked by three men. One of them was wearing police uniform.
- Anatoliy Tanadaychuk – correspondent of the newspaper Panorama (Vinnytsya). The journalist's body with the traces of injections was found in August.

=== 1997 ===
- Volodymyr Bekhter – senior editor of the State Broadcasting Company (Odesa), was beaten to death by the police employees on 22 February.
- Petro Shevchenko – staff writer of the newspaper Kievskie Vedomosti (Kyiv News) in Luhansk. On 13 March he was found hanged in Zhulyany, outside Kyiv, after his disappearance. The reason for his murder could have been a series of reports on the conflict within the local branch of the Security Service of Ukraine.
- Vitaliy Kotsyuk – correspondent of the newspaper Day (Kyiv). On 4 July, unidentified persons beat and burned him to death on a suburban train.
- Volodymyr Katelnytsky – religious activist, journalist and head of the committee of protecting John Demjanjuk. On 8 July, he was brutally murdered along with his mother in his apartment.
- Borys Derevianko – editor-in-chief of the newspaper Evening Odessa (Odesa), murdered on 11 August.

=== 1998 ===
- Oleksiy Yefimenko – editor of the newspaper Renaissance (Saky, Crimea), died after falling from the fourth floor.
- Mykola Rakshanov – journalist of the newspaper Facts (Cherkasy), died in August after receiving a craniocerebral injury. Unlike the doctors, police investigators refused to consider this injury to be a cause of the violent action.
- Albert Borisov – editor-in-chief of the newspaper Miner’s News (Krasnodon, Luhansk Oblast).

=== 1999 ===
- Vyacheslav Chornovil – journalist, dissident, politician, died on 25 March as a result of a car accident that is considered by many researchers to be a well-planned murder.
- Ihor Bondar – director of the broadcasting company “AMT” (Odesa), shot dead on 16 May along with judge Borys Vikhrovy.
- Maryana Chorna – journalist of the TV channel “STB” (Kyiv), found hanged on 24 June .

== 2000s ==
=== 2000 ===
- Vladislav Ryabchikov – correspondent of the newspaper Krymskaya Pravda (Simferopol), died on 27 April as a result of being hit by car. Editorial staff considers this road accident to be an intended murder.
- Georgiy Gongadze – co-founder of the website Ukrainska Pravda, abducted and murdered on 16 September in Tarashchansky district of Kyiv Oblast.
- Yuliy Mazur – editor-in-chief of the newspaper South (Odesa), was found dead on 30 November near the office of “Chornomorya” publishing house.
- Volodymyr Palchikov – journalist of radio centre (Dnipro), murdered on 29 December.
- Volodymyr Smirnov – correspondent of the newspaper Vremya (Time, Mykolayiv), died on 29 December, succumbing to wounds he received as a result of a mob attack in the street.

=== 2001 ===
- Oleg Bilous – editor-in-chief of the weekly magazine XXI Century (Luhansk), shot dead on 24 June near his house.
- Ihor Aleksandrov – director of the private broadcasting company TOR (Slovyansk, Donetsk Oblast), died on 7 July from the numerous injuries he received as a result of an attack by unidentified persons on 3 July at the company's office. The investigation started by Aleksandrov led to the long prison sentences of a few former policemen.
- Oleksandr Kovalenko – editor-in-chief of the newspaper Social Politics (Kyiv), on 8 February was found shot dead in a forest near Zhytomyr.
- Yuriy Honchar – freelance correspondent of the newspaper Facts and comments (Kyiv), murdered in his apartment on 25 October.

=== 2002 ===
- Yuriy Shevtsov – photojournalist of the newspaper Krymskaya Pravda (Simferopol), was found murdered on 3 August in a forest after being missed for several days.
- Volodymyr Provorotsky – host of the regional broadcasting company in Sumy Oblast, murdered on 15 September in his apartment. Official version: domestic motives.
- Oleksandr Panych – journalist of the media Donetsk News (Donetsk), murdered on 15 November by his friend who was acting under the influence of drugs.

=== 2003 ===
- Oleksiy Tereshchuk – deputy editor-in-chief of the newspaper Vinnychyna, brutally beaten in December 2002, died on 10 January.
- Taras Protsyuk – journalist murdered in Iraq.
- Volodymyr Yefremov – correspondent of the Institute of the mass media (Dnipro), on 15 July died in a suspicious car accident.
- Volodymyr Karachentsev – deputy editor-in-chief of the newspaper Courier (Melitopol, Zaporizhzhia Oblast), on 14 December presumably killed in his house.

=== 2004 ===
- Yuriy Chechyk – director of radio station “Yuta” (Poltava), on 3 March died in a suspicious car accident.
- Ishtvan Kasanek – cameraman of the TV channel “M-Studio” (Uzhhorod, Zakarpattia Oblast), died on 2 June under suspicious circumstances.

=== 2006 ===
- Vadym Gudyk – independent journalist (Bila Tserkva, Kyiv Oblast). On 24 May was shot dead on the city's main square.
- Kyrylo Berezhny – editor of the newspaper Orthodox View (Union of the Orthodox Fellowships of Ukraine, Kyiv), died on 8 September.
- Norik Shyrin – founder of Crimean-Tatar newspaper The Voice of Youth (Simferopol), died on 20 December.

=== 2008 ===
- Viktor Valyaev – head of the department and photojournalist of a local newspaper (Novi Sanzhary Raion, Poltava Oblast), died together with his wife on 24 September as a result of a brutal beating during a mob attack of their house that occurred on the previous day.

== 2010s ==
=== 2010 ===
- Vasyl Klymentiev – editor of the newspaper New Style (Kharkiv), disappeared without trace on 11 March and was proclaimed dead.

=== 2012 ===
- Volodymyr Honcharenko – editor of the newspaper Eco-Safety (Dnipro), died on 4 September after being brutally beaten by several persons on 1 August.

=== 2013 ===
- Sergiy Starokozhko – former employee of the newspaper Free Reporter (Luhansk), shot dead on 20 November .

=== 2014 ===
- Vyacheslav Veremiy – reporter of the newspaper Vesti (News, Kyiv), beaten and shot dead on 19 February .
- Ihor Kostenko – journalist of the newspaper Sportanalytic (Sports Analutics, Kyiv), Wikipedia editor, on 20 February was shot dead by a sniper during the Euromaidan protests.
- Vasyl Sergienko – editor of the newspaper Nadrossya (Korsun-Shevchenkivskyi Raion, Cherkasy Oblast), abducted and murdered by the unidentified persons on 4 April.
- Dmytro Ivanov – journalist, music critic, died on 2 May during a fire in Odesa Trade Union building during the Odesa clashes.
- Volodymyr Martsishevsky – journalist of the information bulletin Kamenyari Info (Stonemasons Info), defender of Hostynnyi Dvir in Kyiv. On 11 June he was kidnapped from the Maidan press-centre and brutally beaten. He succumbed to his wounds and died in hospital on 15 June.
- Sergei Dolgov – journalist and editor for the Vestnik Pryazovya and Khochu v SSSR in Mariupol, Donetsk Oblast, before he went missing. Disappeared June 18, 2014. His disappearance is widely seen as politically motivated.
- Oleksandr Kuchinsky – editor-in-chief of the newspaper Criminal Express, author of the books Chronicles of Donetsk banditry (both written in Russian), murdered on 29 November together with his wife in his suburban residence in the town of Bogorodyne near Slovyansk, Donetsk Oblast.

=== 2015 ===
- Olga Moroz – editor-in-chief of the newspaper Netishynsky Herald (Khmelnytskyi Oblast), was murdered on 15 March in her house.
- Serhiy Sukhobok – founder of the newspaper Reflection, co-founder of the online-media ProUA and “Obkom”, murdered in Rusanivski Gardens (Kyiv) on 13 April .
- Oles Buzina – was a journalist and writer known for his strong pro-Russian views. He was murdered on 16 April, shot on the footpath not far from his flat in Kyiv. In June Ukrainian authorities arrested three suspects believed to be behind the murder. Previously, he said on a Russian TV show that he was receiving constant death threats. A previously unknown Ukrainian nationalist group calling itself the "Ukrainian Insurgent Army" was reported to claim responsibility for the murders of Buzina and other pro-Russian figures. However, Markian Lubkivskyi, an advisor at the Security Service of Ukraine, said that linguistic analysis of the telephone call indicated they were not native Ukrainian speakers, and head of the Main Investigations Directorate of the Security Service of Ukraine Vasyl Vovk said the organization was fake.

=== 2016 ===
- Pavel Sheremet – Belarusian, Russian and Ukrainian TV, radio and periodical media journalist, died on 20 July in Kyiv as a result of a vehicle explosion.

=== 2018 ===
- Kateryna Handziuk – was a civil rights and anti-corruption activist campaigner and political advisor, who exposed corruption in her hometown of Kherson. She was attacked with sulphuric acid on 31 July and died from her injuries on 4 November. In 2012 she became a co-founder of citizen journalism Agency (MOST) and website most.ks.ua. The site has become a platform, illuminating issues of local politics, and later became the only region in the media, focused on the monitoring of public procurement and spending of public finances. The team of the Agency for Citizen Journalism (MOST) is engaged in anti-corruption and monitoring research in Kherson Oblast. After her death, spontaneous mourning occurred in Kyiv, in which hundreds of demonstrators moved to the Ministry of Interior and demanded the complete investigation of the murder.

== 2020s ==
=== 2022 ===
- Brent Renaud

=== 2024 ===
- Gonzalo Lira – died in hospital while detained. His father claims it was due to US & Ukrainian hostility towards his work.
- Victoria Roshchyna – disappeared in August 2023 died in October 2024 in Russian detention. The Ukrainian government investigates her death as a potential murder and war crime.

=== 2025 ===
- Tetiana Kulyk

== See also ==
- List of journalists killed in Europe
- Human rights in Ukraine
- Media of Ukraine
- International Day to End Impunity for Crimes Against Journalists
- Committee to Protect Journalists
- Freedom House
- Media freedom in the European Union
- Reporters Without Borders
- Amnesty International

== General sources ==
- Article «68 deaths for truth» | September 15, 2012, 06:39 © 2000–2018, ООО «Publishing House Ukrainian Media Holding» (in Ukrainian) Стаття «68 смертей за правду»
- Article «7 Lviv journalists who died in the years of Independence» | 20:1 September 16, 2014 © tvoemisto.tv MEDIA-HAB "YOUR CITY" (in Ukrainian) Стаття «7 львівських журналістів, які загинули в роки незалежності»
- Media public organizations demand the government to hold the culprits accountable for the attacks against the journalists © 2001–2018, «Telekritika.ua» (in Ukrainian) Медійні громадські організації вимагають від влади покарати винних у нападах на журналістів
- 08.04.2005 | 16:43 | Press center State Committee for Television and Radio-broadcasting (Ukraine) held a round table meeting dedicated to memory of the dead Ukrainian journalists © State Committee for Television and Radio-broadcasting (Ukraine) (in Ukrainian) 8 квітня 2005 року о 10.00 Державний комітет телебачення і радіомовлення України провів засідання "круглого столу", присвячений пам'яті загиблих журналістів України
- Since 1991 more than 60 journalists have died, about 50 have suffered this month | December 26, 2013 - 15:00 © 1997-2018 The Day (in Russian) С 1991 года погибло более 60 журналистов, около 50 пострадали за этот месяц
- List of Ukraine's dead journalists: from Gongadze and Protsiuk SEPTEMBER 16, 2014, 17:48 | © 2018 ESPRESO.TV (in Ukrainian) Список загиблих журналістів України: від Гонгадзе та Процюка
- In Kyiv journalists organized a march in memory of their dead colleagues | 09:3 September 17, 2015 © Independent Media Trade Union of Ukraine (in Ukrainian) У Києві журналісти провели ходу на честь загиблих колег
