= Ukrinform =

State information and news agency of Ukraine

National News Agency of Ukraine
- Native name: Українське національне інформаційне агентство
- Type: State enterprise
- Industry: News agency
- Founded: March 16, 1918
- Headquarters: 8/16, Bohdan Khmelnytskoho, Kyiv, Ukraine, 01001
- Key people: Oleksandr Kharchenko
- Revenue: 16,043,000 hryvnia (2025)
- Total assets: 19,672,000 hryvnia (2025)
- Owner: Ministry of Culture and Information Policy
- Number of employees: 6,250 (2025)
- Website: ukrinform.net uatv.ua/en/

The National News Agency of Ukraine (Ukrainian: Українське національне інформаційне агентство), or Ukrinform (Ukrainian: Укрінформ), is a state information and news agency, and international broadcaster of Ukraine. It was founded in 1918 during the Ukrainian War of Independence as the Bureau of Ukrainian Press (BUP). The first director of the agency was Dmytro Dontsov, when the agency name was The Ukrainian Telegraph Agency.

Ukrinform is Ukraine's representative of the European Alliance of News Agencies (EANA) and the Black Sea Association of National News Agencies (BSANNA).

Ukrinform delivers news stories in Ukrainian, Russian, English, German, Spanish, French, Japanese, and Polish.

== History ==
Previous logo of Ukrinform

The state agency was established as the Bureau of Ukrainian Press (BUP) in 1918, yet since then it went through a series of reorganizations. During the Soviet period, it was associated with Telegraph Agency of the Soviet Union (TASS).

- 1918 – Bureau of Ukrainian Press
- 1920 – All-Ukrainian bureau of the Russian Telegraph Agency (UkROSTA)
- 1921 – Radio-Telegraph Agency of Ukraine (RATAU)
- 1990 – Ukrainian National Informational Agency (UKRINFORM)
- 1996 – State Informational Agency of Ukraine (DINAU)
- 2000 – Ukrainian National Informational Agency (UKRINFORM)
- 2015 – Ukrinform became a part of the Multimedia Broadcasting Platform of Ukraine (UA|TV)
- 2018 – Ukrinform signed a co-operation agreement with the Athens–Macedonian News Agency (ANA) providing for an exchange of news items in all categories.
- 2025-02-25 - Tetiana Kulyk, editor-in-chief of the multimedia department and the host of patriotic Nation of Invincibles project, was killed in a night-time drone attack by Russia on her home

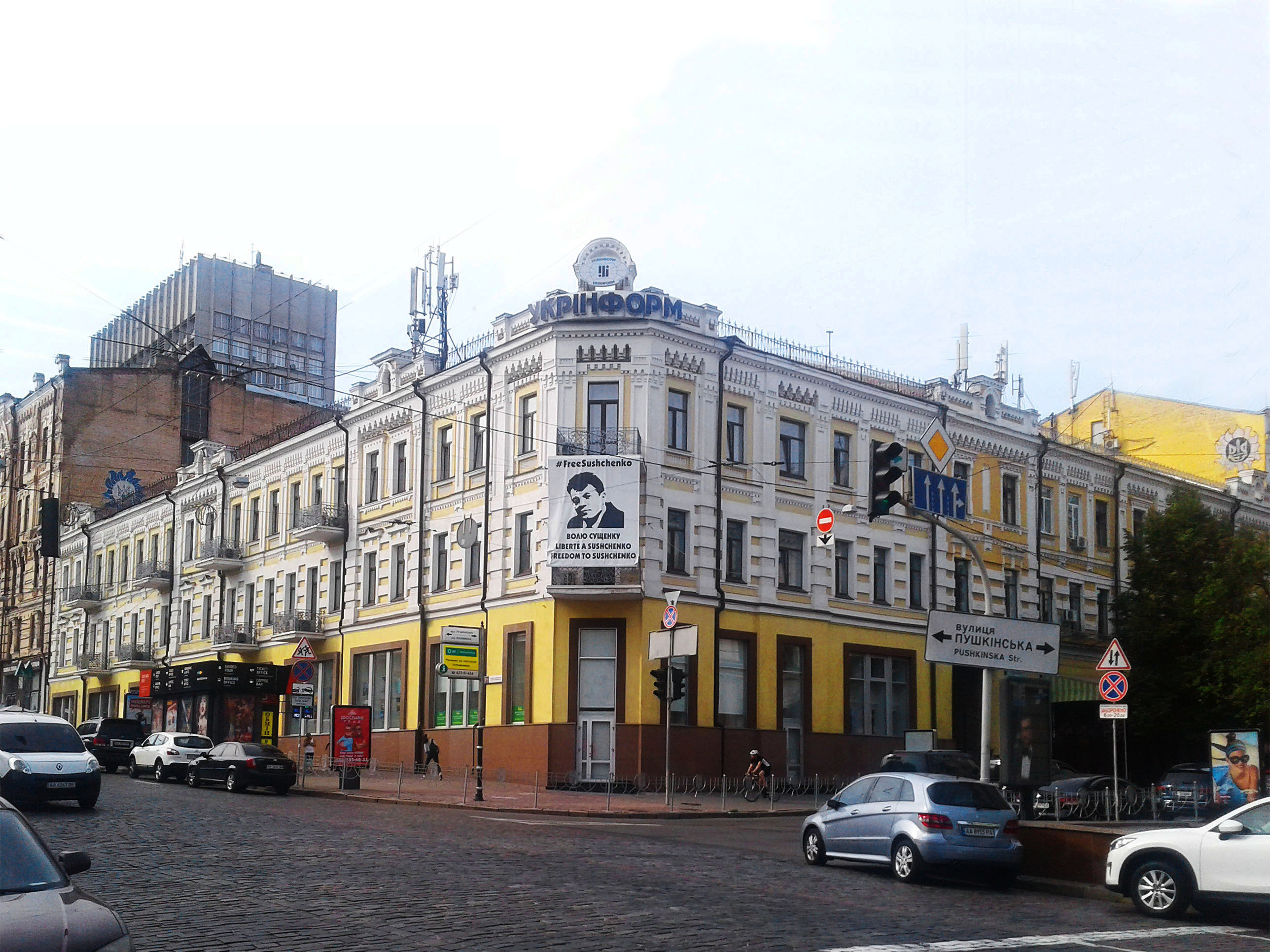
Corporate headquarters in Kyiv

== Outlook ==
Ukrinform's main objectives are the coverage of public policy and public life in Ukraine and providing information to government bodies; according to a Decree of the Cabinet of Ministers of Ukraine from February 19, 1997 the agency carries out its activities independently of political parties and public organizations.

Per day Ukrinform issues reports in English, German, Ukrainian, Polish, French, Spanish, Japanese. Ukrinform delivers information to the media, TV channels, radio stations, official establishments and local governments, foreign embassies and Ukrainian diplomatic missions abroad and foreign media. In March 2022, the Institute of Mass Information recommended Ukrinform as a reliable and trustworthy media outlet.

== Television ==
Logo of FREEДОМ

FREEДОМ (formerly UATV) is a Russian-language television news channel with focus on the Russo-Ukrainian War. It is transmitted live on its website, via satellite, and through cable television operators. It has content in English on YouTube. Prior to its temporary closure in January 2020, the channel also broadcast in English, Ukrainian, Crimean Tatar and Arabic.
