= March of the Defenders =

Military march dedicated to the Independence Day of Ukraine

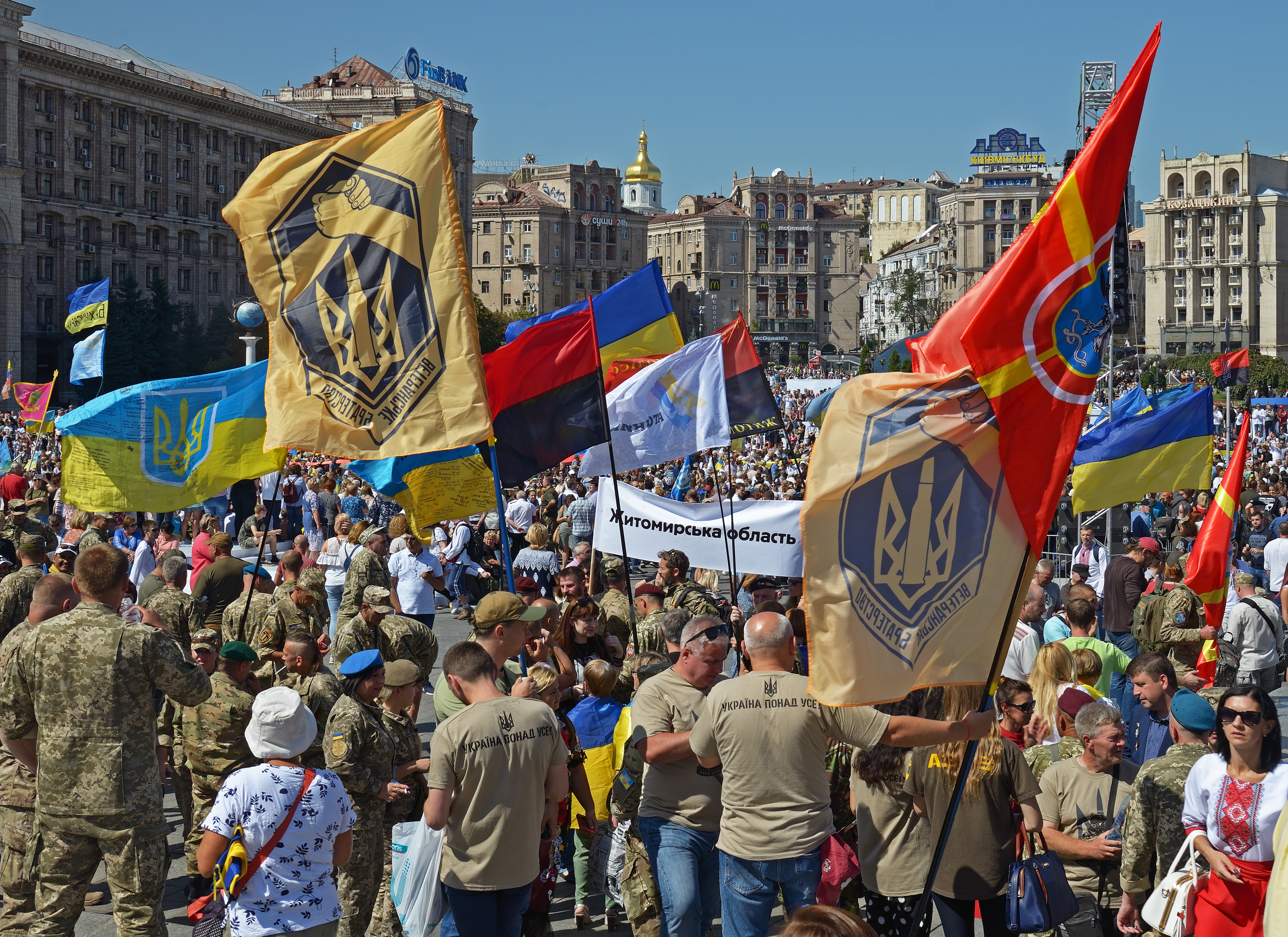
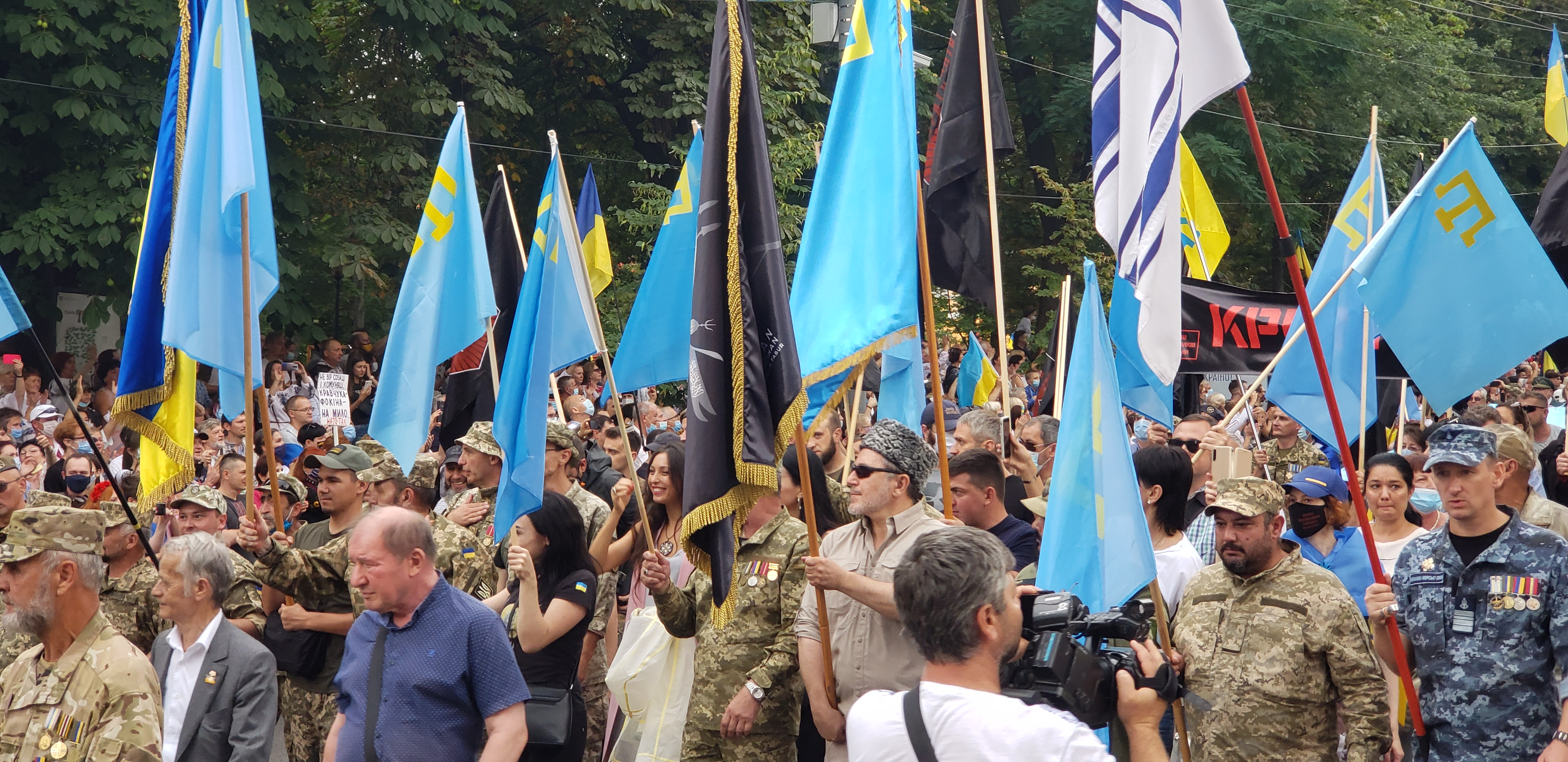
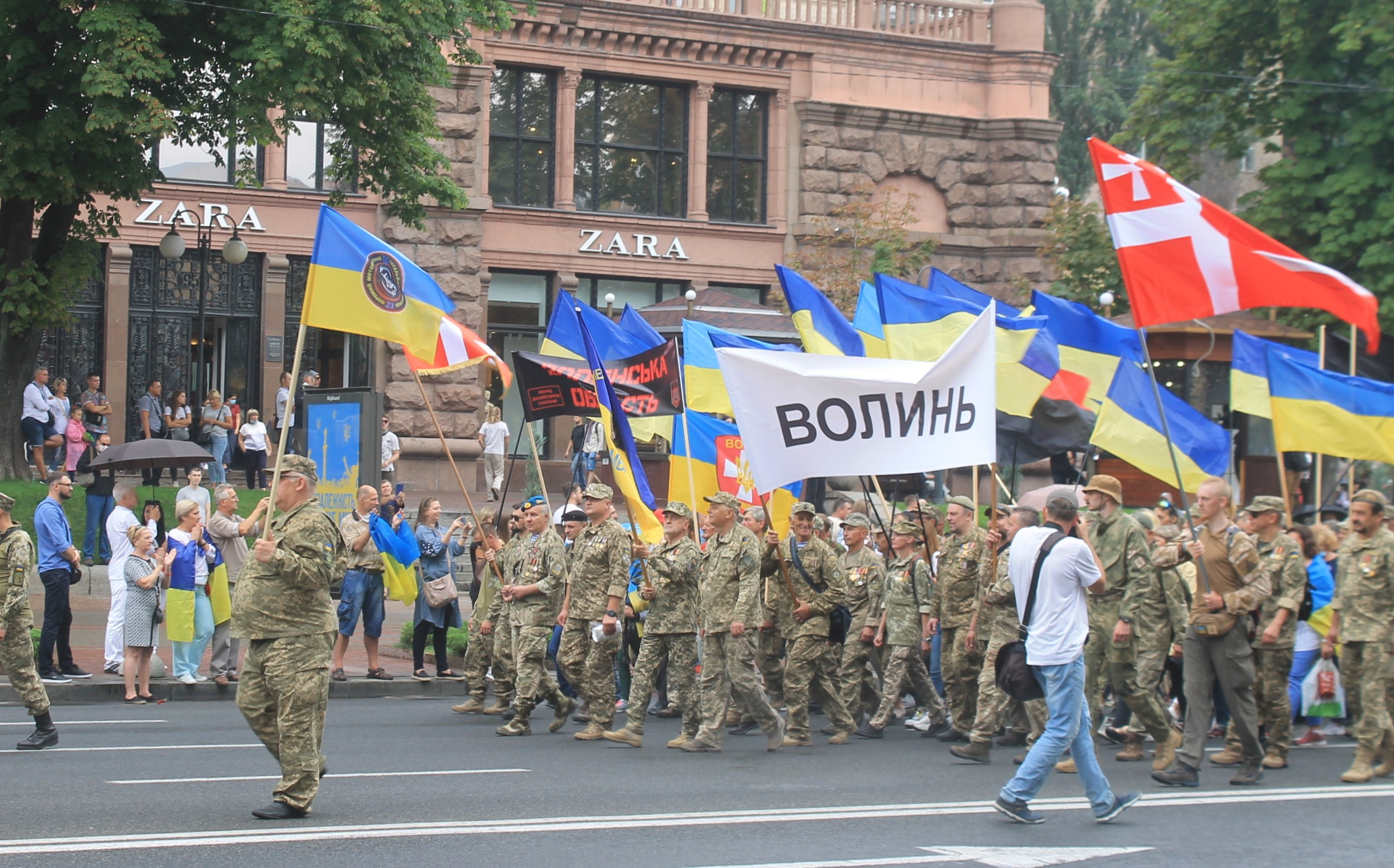
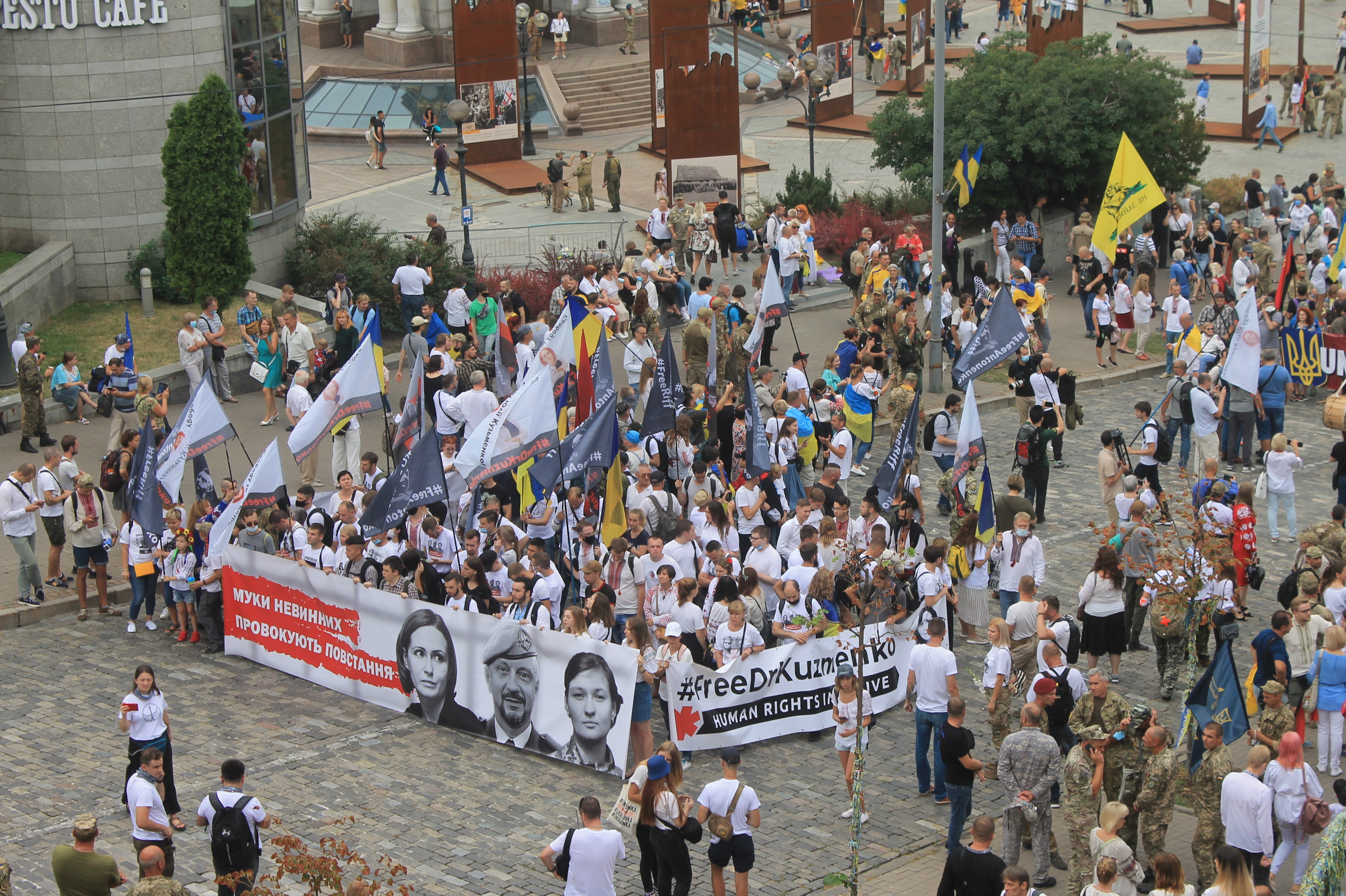
Clockwise from top left:
- The 2019 March of Defenders featuring the Ukrainian Insurgent Army's war flag
- 2020 march featuring the Crimean Tatar flag
- Volyn Oblast veterans of the War in Donbas during the 2020 procession
- Protestors demanding the release of War in Donbas veterans that were arrested in December 2019 on the suspicion of killing journalist Pavel Sheremet during the 2020 march

The March of the Defenders (Ukrainian: Марш захисників України, romanized: Marsh zakhysnykiv Ukrainy) also known as the Alternative Parade is a public march and demonstration held on the occasion of the Independence Day of Ukraine. This celebration honors all the veterans and serving personnel of the Armed Forces of Ukraine, especially those who have been killed in action.

== 2019 ==
The first parade took place on 24 August 2019 in Kyiv, timed to the 28th Independence Day. The organizers expected the participation of about 8,000 people, but according to various estimates, up to 25,000 people took part in the procession.

=== Background ===
On 10 July 2019, Ukrainian President Volodymyr Zelenskyy announced on Facebook that the Independence Day celebrations will not include the annual Kyiv Independence Day Parade. Zelenskyy also stated "We have decided to allocate ₴300 million (nearly $12 million) as bonus payments to our servicemen, i.e. fixed-term soldiers, cadets, sergeants, officers". Head of the Office of the President of Ukraine Andriy Bohdan announced that the celebration would be held in a new format, without a parade of troops of military equipment. Instead, there was a procession called a March of Dignity (Марш гідності) with the participation of Zelensky. This caused a wave of discontent and dissatisfaction among Ukrainian society, specifically veterans of the Armed Forces of Ukraine. In light of this news, independent activists offered to hold their own, "people's" march. According to some media reports, the march was not opposed to the official celebration, the events rather complemented each other, while according to others, there was in fact a political element of opposition at the march.

=== Events ===
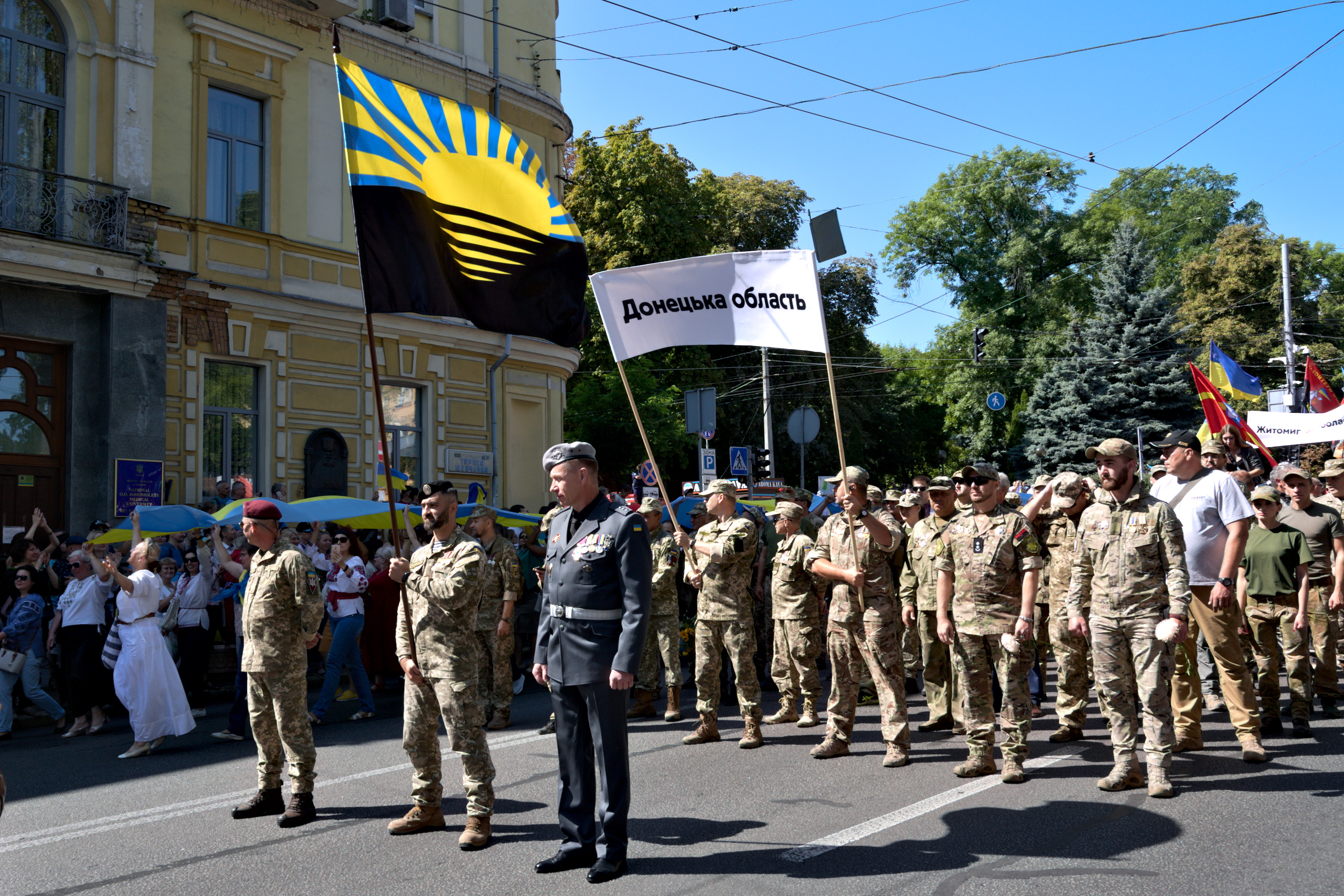
Donetsk Oblast veterans of the War in Donbas during the procession

At 9:00 am, columns of participants began to form near Shevchenko Park, on Volodymyrska Street. Two hours later, the march itself began, with the columns moving down to the Khreshchatyk and through Bessarabska Square. At the head of the column were two camouflage vehicles and a police car.

The column went all the way to the Central Department Store (TsUM) on Maidan Nezalezhnosti where it concluded. While on the Maidan, the participants lined up, sang Shche ne vmerla Ukrayina, and then climbed with the audience to the "Wall of Memory", where a prayer service was held for those killed in the ongoing Russo-Ukrainian War. The march was scheduled to end at one o'clock on Mykhailivska Square. An interfaith prayer service was held in the St. Michael's Golden-Domed Monastery. According to the National Police of Ukraine, there were about 20,000 participants in the event, and a total of 50,000 people gathered on Independence Square. On the Maidan, marchers raised portraits of 96 Ukrainian political prisoners and prisoners of war who remain in Russian prisons.

=== In other cities ===
- Kharkiv: More than a thousand participants marched with a drumbeat through the city center, from Constitution Square to the Taras Shevchenko Monument.
- Odesa: The march was held in the square of the Heavenly Hundred.
- Dnipro: a march of veterans was held through the central streets of the city.

=== Organization ===
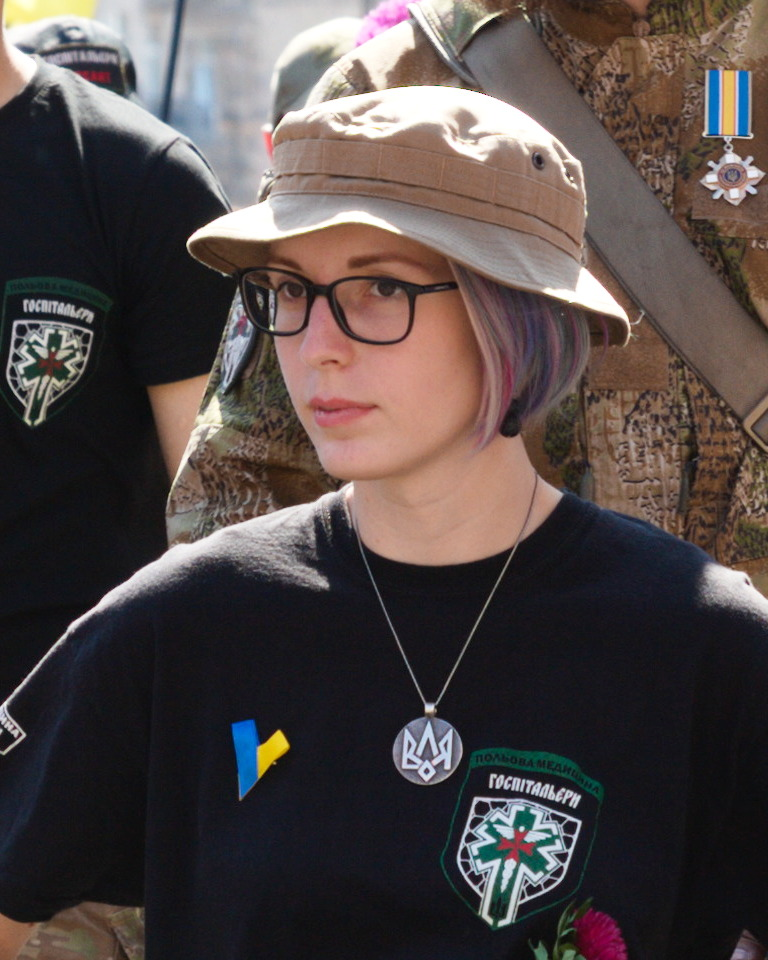
Yana Zinkevych at the march

The organizers of the march were the Movement of Veterans of Ukraine and the Come Back Alive non-governmental organization. The chief organizer was Dmytro Shatrovsky, a veteran of the Azov Battalion of the Ukrainian National Guard. Initially, the columns were divided by region, almost each column had a corresponding flag with the name of its region. Some did not have such a poster, in particular, Crimea. The 1st and 2nd Chairmen of the Mejlis of the Crimean Tatar People (Mustafa Dzhemilev and Refat Chubarov respectively) marched in the Crimean column. Other participants included the Aidar Battalion, the Azov Regiment, the 90th Airmobile Battalion, Ukrainian Volunteer Corps, the Right Sector, Municipal Guard, the Ukrainian National Assembly – Ukrainian People's Self-Defence, and the ASAP Rescue NGO. Among those who came to support the march were journalist Yanina Sokolova, historian Volodymyr Viatrovych, diplomat Volodymyr Omelyan, physician Ulana Suprun, and Deputy Minister for the temporarily occupied territories and internally displaced persons George Tuka. Representing the United States Department of State was United States Special Representative for Ukraine Kurt Volker and the Chargé d'Affaires of the United States in Ukraine William B. Taylor Jr.

== 2020 ==
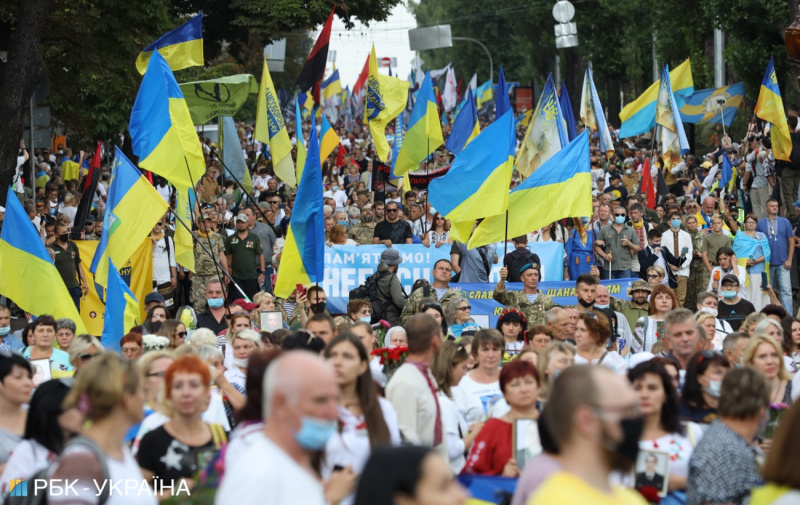
A column of participants at the March of Defenders of Ukraine, August 24, 2020

The second parade took place on 24 August 2020 in Kyiv, marking the 29th Independence Day of Ukraine. It began in Shevchenko Park, passed through Shevchenko Boulevard, Bessarabian and European Squares and ended on Maidan Nezalezhnosti. According to media reports, at least 50,000 people took part in the parade.

=== In other cities ===
- Lviv: a "March of the Unconquered" in honor of "Ukrainian servicemen who died for independent Ukraine and are defending their state in Donbas" was held.
- Zaporizhia: a march of veterans was held through the central streets of the city.
- Odesa: a March of Defenders was held.

== See also ==
- Kyiv Independence Day Parade
- Immortal Regiment
- Victory Day Parades
- Veterans Day
