= Alexander Shchetinin =

Russian journalist

Alexander Shchetinin (27 August 1962 – 27 August 2016) was a Russian opposition journalist, later working in Ukraine. He was found dead on his birthday with gunshot wound to his head, just one month later after the murder of journalist Pavel Sheremet. They both died in Kyiv.

== Life ==
Alexander Shchetinin was the founder of the Novyi Region (New Region) press agency and a critic of Russian president Vladimir Putin. After the Euromaidan uprising in 2014, he gave up his Russian citizenship before becoming a Ukrainian national and settling in the capital. He then complained of unacceptable pressure by the Russian government on the editors the Novyi Region news agency. In Kyiv, he re-launched the company, naming it Novyi Region 2 and located it on the Ukrainian ".ua" Internet domain. The site was fiercely critical about Russo-Ukrainian War, including a particular focus on detailing techniques of Russia's propaganda operations.

Alexander Shchetenin publicly criticized both Vladimir Putin, whom he called a "personal enemy" running a "fascist dictatorship," and Petro Poroshenko, the president of Ukraine, whom he accused of corruption.

== Death ==
The body of Alexander Shchetinin was found at his flat after friends tried to visit him on his birthday. He was found with a gun near his body along with spent cartridges, and the door to his apartment was said to be locked.
