= Tetiana Kulyk =

Ukrainian journalist, TV anchor

- Born: 12 June 1982
- Died: 26 February 2025 (aged 42); Kriukivshchyna, Bucha District, Ukraine
- Cause of death: Drone strike
- Resting place: Baikove Cemetery
- Education: Kyiv National University of Culture and Arts
- Occupations: journalist, editor-in-chief
- Employer: Ukrinform
- Notable work: Nation of Invincibles project
- Spouse: Pavlo Ivanchov
- Children: 1

Tetiana Mykolaivna Kulyk (Ukrainian: Тетяна Миколаївна Кулик, d. February 26, 2025 in Kriukivshchyna, Bucha District, Ukraine) was a Ukrainian journalist. She worked as the author and host of the Nation of Invincibles project and as the editor-in-chief of the multimedia department of Ukrinform, the national news agency of Ukraine.

Kulyk and her husband, a cancer surgeon and professor at the Bogomolets National Medical University Pavlo Ivanchov (Ukrainian: Павло Васильович Іванчов), were killed in a Russian airstrike (Shahed drone) on their home in Bucha District on the night of 25–26 February 2025. A memorial ceremony for the couple was held on 3 March 2025 at the Bogomolets National Medical University. They were buried at the Baikove Cemetery in Kyiv.

According to the Coalition For Women In Journalism, Kulyk was the tenth female journalist murdered by Russia since its full-scale invasion of Ukraine in February 2022. A representative of the UN Secretary-General condemned the journalist's killing, as did the International Federation of Journalists. A drone strike deliberately targeting civilians is a grave breach of the Geneva Conventions, i.e. a war crime. The Secretary-General of the United Nations Educational, Scientific and Cultural Organization UNESCO, Audrey Azoulay, also condemned the killing of the journalist. Journalists' organizations and the UNESCO Secretary-General called for a thorough and transparent investigation into the incident and for the perpetrators to be brought to justice. The UNESCO Secretary-General recalled the principles of international humanitarian law, including United Nations Security Council Resolution 2222 (2015). This resolution was adopted to protect journalists, media professionals and related personnel in conflict situations. According to the Geneva Conventions, parties are obliged to seek out and bring to justice those suspected of grave breaches of the Conventions, regardless of their nationality.

Tetiana Kulyk studied at the Kyiv National University of Culture and Arts. She began her career as a literary journalist. From 2015 to 2017, she worked as the deputy director of the Khreshchatyk, 26 (Ukrainian: Хрещатик, 26) unit of the Ukrainian national public broadcaster Suspilne in the Kyiv region.

She also worked as a presenter for KDTRK channel, for Radio Ukraine International, and as a television presenter for the national broadcaster Suspilne. Just a week before her death, she became editor-in-chief of the multimedia editorial department of Ukrinform.

For several years, Kulyk highlighted the Ukrainian resistance. From 2024 to 2025, she scripted and hosted, among other things, Ukrinform's weekly series 'Nation of Invincibles' (Ukrainian: Нація непереможних). The series, broadcast on YouTube, told the story of Ukraine's struggle and highlighted the nation's resilience through various interviewees. Kulyk and her colleagues chose to interview Ukrainians, whom she herself admired. Together with the interviewees, she reflected on the transience of life, which without the war could have been full of joyful moments.
