= Pavel Sheremet =

Belarusian-born Russian and Ukrainian journalist

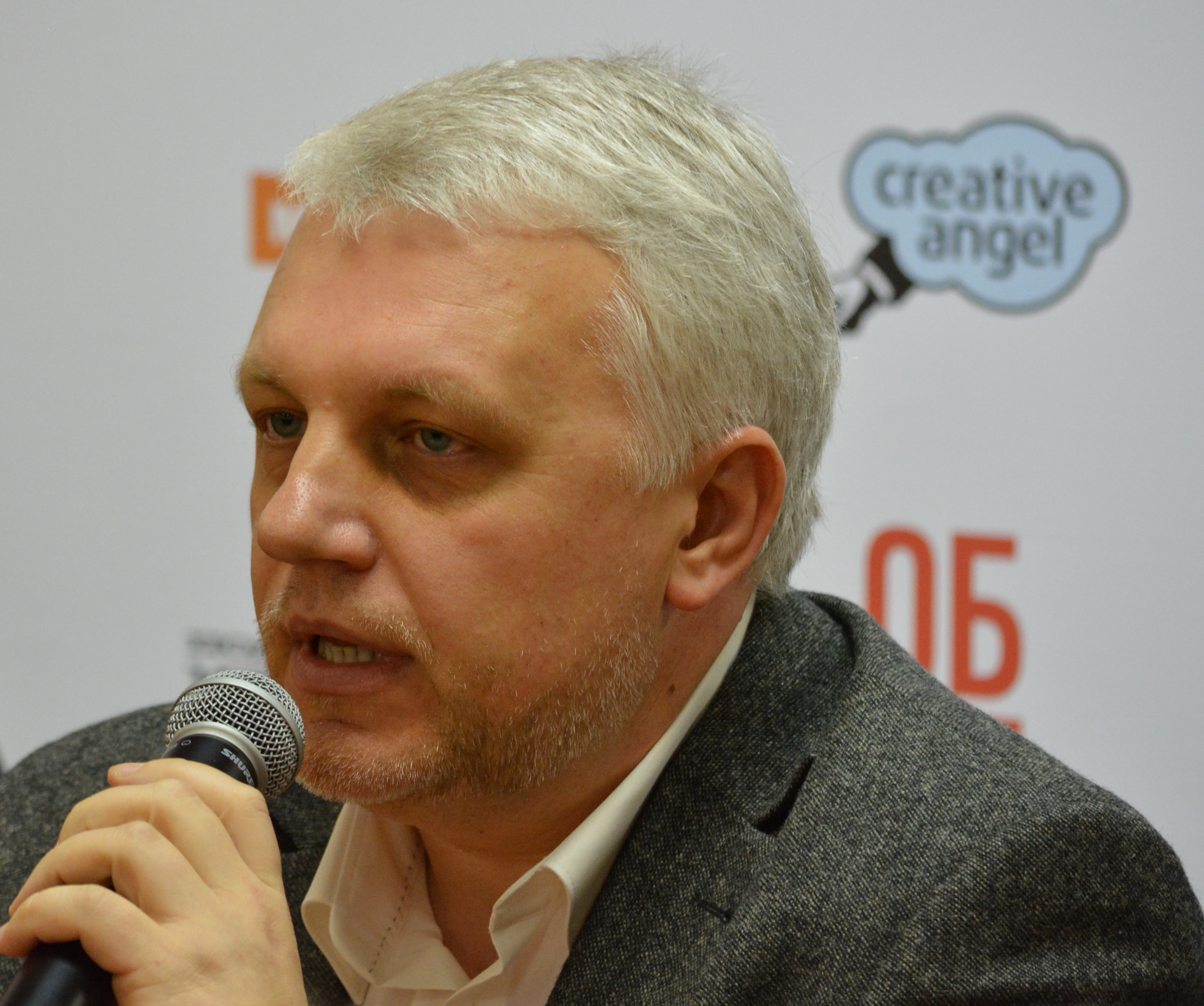
- Sheremet in 2014
- Born: Pavel Grigorievich Sheremet; 28 November 1971; Minsk, Byelorussian SSR, Soviet Union
- Died: 20 July 2016 (aged 44); Kyiv, Ukraine
- Occupation: Journalist
- Children: 2
- Awards: CPJ International Press Freedom Award (1998) Organization for Security and Co-operation in Europe Prize for Journalism and Democracy (2001)

Pavel Grigorievich Sheremet (Russian: Павел Григорьевич Шеремет, Belarusian: Павел Рыгоравіч Шарамет; 28 November 1971 – 20 July 2016) was a Belarusian-born Russian and Ukrainian journalist who was imprisoned by the government of Belarus in 1997, sparking an international incident between Belarus and Russia. The New York Times has described him as "known for his crusading reports about political abuses in Belarus" and "a thorn in the side of Lukashenko's autocratic government". He was awarded the Committee to Protect Journalists' International Press Freedom Award in 1999 and the Organization for Security and Co-operation in Europe's Prize for Journalism and Democracy in 2002.

Pavel Sheremet died in Kyiv on 20 July 2016 in a car explosion. The Ukrainian Prosecutor's Office stated in July 2016 that the explosion was caused by a bomb and labelled the death of Sheremet a murder.

== Biography ==
=== Early career ===
From 1994 to April 1995, Sheremet was the anchor and producer of Prospekt, a weekly news and analysis program on Belarus state television. The program was banned by Belarusian president Alexander Lukashenko one week before a referendum to increase the president's powers.

Sheremet then became editor-in-chief of the Belarusian newspaper Belorusskaya Delovaya Gazeta. The same year, he also began working for the Russian public television company ORT and was named its Minsk bureau chief in 1996. Because of the increasing control of Belarusian media by the Lukashenko government, Russian television was often the primary resource of Belarusian citizens for alternative news.

=== Border-crossing incident ===
On 22 July 1997, Sheremet, along with an ORT cameraman and their drivers, filmed himself crossing illegally from Belarus to Lithuania and back again to show the ease with which smugglers could cross the border. Lukashenko's government was in the midst of an anti-smuggling initiative and had only recently ordered new troops to the borders. Sheremet and his companions were detained by a border patrol after jumping a fence to film unguarded areas. Sheremet and one crew member, Dmitry Zavadsky, were later charged with illegal border crossing, "exceeding their professional rights as journalists", and participating in a conspiracy.

Russian authorities protested the arrests, which led to what BBC News called a "public row" between the two nations. Yeltsin canceled a planned trip for Lukashenko to visit Moscow after he was already on his way; his plane was denied entry into Russian airspace. On 18 January 1998, Sheremet and Zavadsky were sentenced to two years' imprisonment and 18 months' imprisonment, respectively, but given suspended sentences and a "nominal" fine of US$15.

=== Further journalistic career ===
In November 1997, Sheremet was one of the signatories of Charter Ninety-Seven, a pro-democracy manifesto demanding an end to "the infringement of basic human rights and liberties by the administration of President Alexander Lukashenko". Sheremet also acted as the movement's spokesman.

In 1999, he conducted a rare television interview with Naina Yeltsina, which The New York Times criticized as "indulgent" and "[doing] its best to present Mrs. Yeltsin in a sympathetic light"; Sheremet's station ORT was largely controlled by oligarch Boris A. Berezovsky, a Yeltsin ally.

Sheremet's partner and former co-defendant Dmitry Zavadsky disappeared on 7 July 2000, failing to arrive for a meeting at the Minsk airport with Sheremet. Sheremet accused the Belarusian authorities of having arranged his forced disappearance in retaliation for his reporting, later alleging that he had been informed of government "death squads" by former Belarusian General Prosecutor Oleg Bazhelko. Zavadsky was declared legally dead in 2003.

In 2012 Sheremet started working at the Internet newspaper Ukrainska Pravda (Ukrainian Truth), where he launched a journalistic blog. In 2015 he led a Ukrainian radio programme "Radio "Visti", first on weekends in the program "Show of Pavel Sheremet», and then on weekdays in the "Morning of Pavel Sheremet".

Sheremet resigned from the Public Television of Russia (OTR) in July 2014, saying that journalists who didn't follow the "style of Kremlin propaganda" while covering the Russo-Ukrainian War were "hounded".

He was a critic of Belarusian President Alexander Lukashenko, of Russian President Vladimir Putin and, later, of Ukrainian President Petro Poroshenko, as well as a personal friend of assassinated Russian opposition politician Boris Nemtsov. He publicly criticized the Annexation of Crimea by the Russian Federation and the Russian military intervention in Ukraine. In his last blog post, on 17 July 2016, he worried that today's Ukrainian politicians who are former members of Ukrainian volunteer battalions could attempt a coup in Ukraine, and accused them of being above the law and having alliances with crime syndicates.

== Personal life ==
Sheremet was married with two children, a son and a daughter. In his final years he lived with Olena Prytula in Kyiv.

== Assassination ==
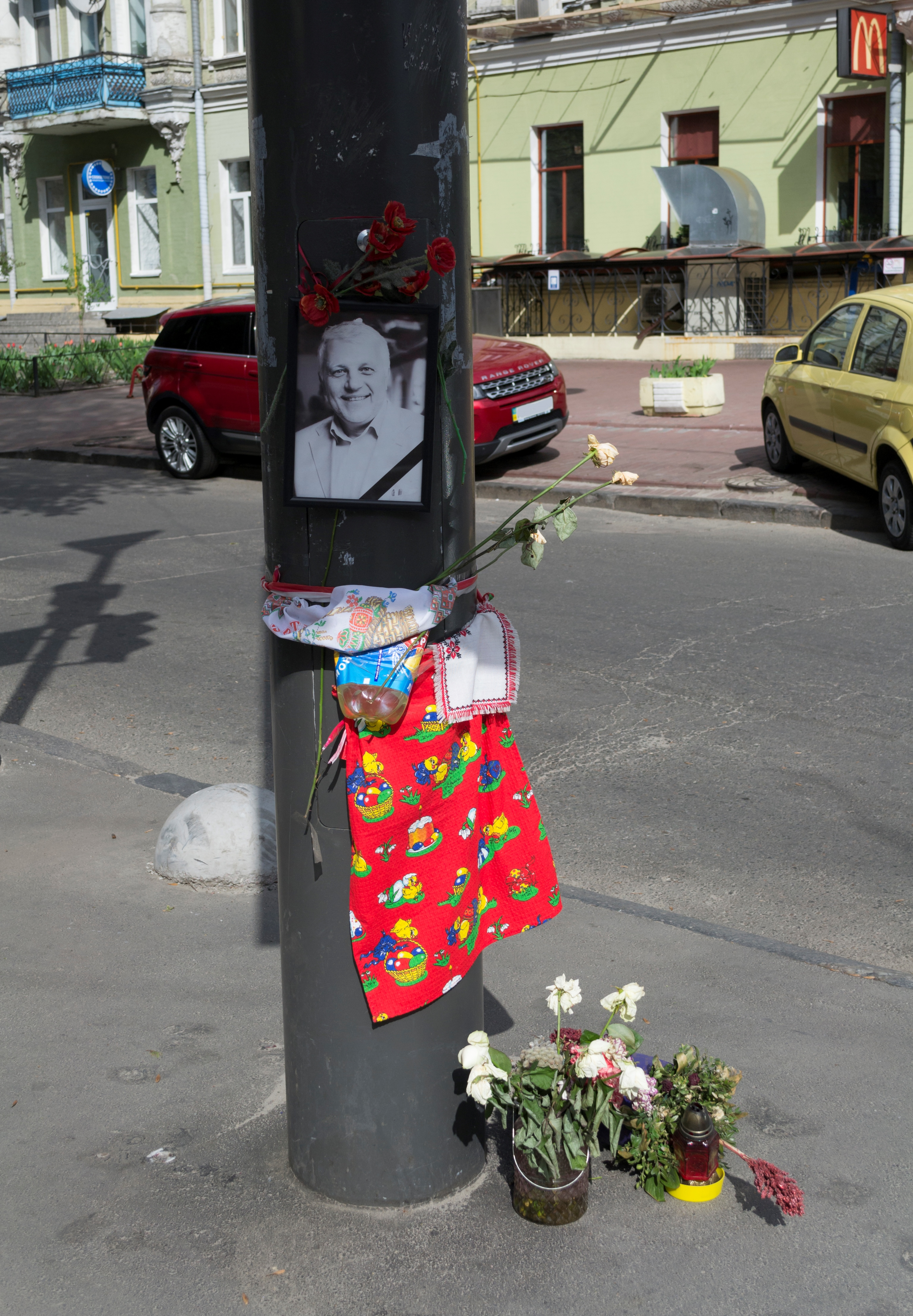
An improvised memorial on the site of Sheremet's murder

Sheremet died in a car explosion in downtown Kyiv (Shevchenkivskyi Raion), on 20 July 2016. Several reports referred to the explosion as a car bomb, and Prosecutor General Yuriy Lutsenko described it as a murder. He was in a red Subaru XV that belonged to his common-law wife and partner, the former editor-in-chief of Ukrainska Pravda Olena Prytula. She was not in the car at the time. According to Novaya Gazeta, Sheremet and Prytula had recently told friends they were under surveillance. Immediately following his death, an official from Ukraine's Ministry of Internal Affairs said "We cannot rule out the possible participation of the Russian special services in this crime".

Sheremet was buried in Minsk on 23 July 2016. The day before a procession through Kyiv was held for him attended by friends, colleagues, lawmakers, and government officials—among them President Petro Poroshenko.

External videos
- "Killing Pavel", a documentary produced by the Organized Crime and Corruption Reporting Project (OCCRP) and its Ukrainian partner, Slidstvo.Info, YouTube video

An independent investigation by the OCCRP published as an online documentary revealed severe shortcomings in the official investigation and has implicated the involvement of the Security Service of Ukraine.

=== Reaction ===
Ukrainian President Petro Poroshenko called Sheremet's death a "terrible tragedy". Prime Minister Volodymyr Groysman called the death of Sheremet "terrible news" in a statement on Facebook.

=== Arrests in 2019 ===
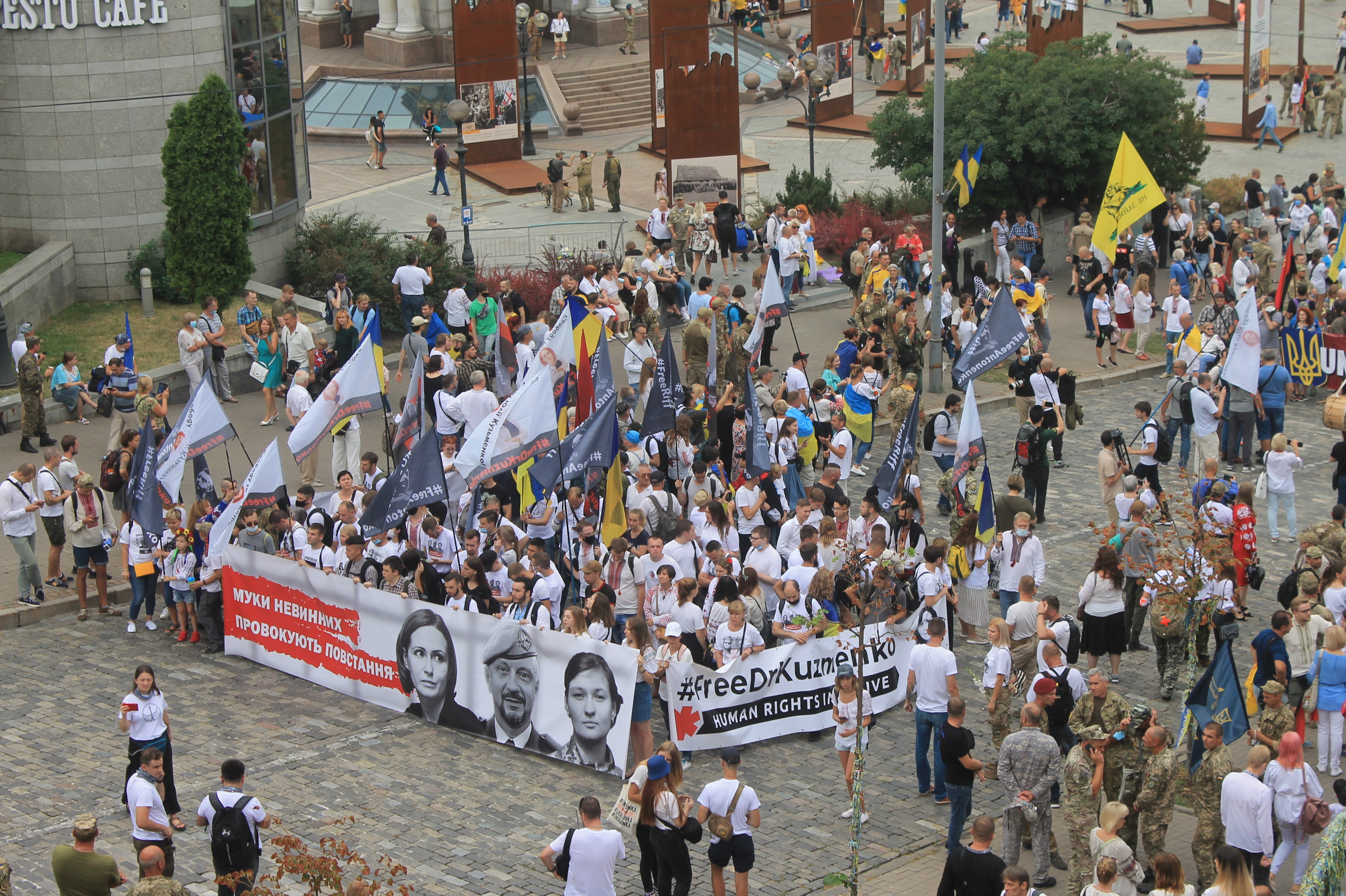
A call for the release of the 2019 arrested suspects of killing Sheremet during the 2020 March of Defenders

Since 2016, Ukrainian and international organizations repeatedly urged for progress in the investigation of Pavel Sheremet's murder. The National Police classified all court decisions in Sheremet's case since 24 July 2017 for security reasons. On 23 July 2019, Head of the National Police Serhiy Knyazev told that the murder of Pavel Sheremet still remained unsolved, and the newly elected President of Ukraine Volodymyr Zelenskyy told that those responsible for the murder of Pavel Sheremet would be found.

In December 2019 five veterans of the war in Donbas were arrested on the suspicion of killing Sheremet. On 12 December 2019 Ukrainian mass-media broadcast a televised press conference by the Ministry of Internal Affairs (Ukraine), with the presence of top officials including President Volodymyr Zelenskyy, reporting the "successful finalizing of the investigation of Pavel Sheremet' murder". Reporters without borders point to the fact that Minister of Interior Avakov has had a personal reason to be in haste with this. According to Ukrainian authorities the aim for the murder was "to destabilise the political situation in Ukraine". Authorities also claimed that another veteran of the war in Donbas, Olena Sambul, was to be the next victim. On 13 December 2019, two of the suspects, namely Andriy Antonenko, a Donbas war veteran and rock musician, and Yulia Kuzmenko, civil volunteer and pediatric surgeon, were remanded in custody until 8 February 2020. Ukrainian journalists were sceptical about the evidence that was disclosed and the alleged motive.

As the investigation in Ukraine unveils, 10 January 2020 Reporters Without Borders have expressed their concern over "inconsistencies in the evidence for the Ukrainian authorities' claim to have solved (…) editor Pavel Sheremet’s 2016 murder", and pointed toward "a series of revelations (…) that has cast further doubt on the investigation".

On 30 January 2020, Ukrainian Prosecutor-General Ruslan Ryaboshapka admitted that the prosecution has not enough evidence needed for the murder case of journalist Pavel Sheremet to go to trial. "The volume of compiled evidence isn't enough," he told the Interfax news agency in an interview. Previously William Taylor, the former U.S. chargé d'affaires in Ukraine, has suggested Interior Minister Arsen Avakov isn't certain that the people who were charged with the murder (i.e. Kuzmenko, Antonenko and Dugar) are guilty. RSF, a France-based media watchdog, has called the probe a "flawed three-and-a-half-year investigation." Despite appeals for more clement preventive measure (i.e. home arrest, or bail), and of guarantees from esteemed citizens, in subsequent court sessions the term of pre-trial remand in custody for Kuzmenko and Antonenko was extended until 30 May, and subsequently until 13 September 2020.

=== Possible involvement of Belarusian special agencies ===
On 4 January 2021, the EU Observer reported that new evidence, including documents and audio recordings, was found in connection with Sheremet's murder. An audio file, allegedly being a recording from a bugged meeting in 2012, reveals Vadim Zaitsev, the KGB chairman at the time, discussing the murder plot with two officers from the KGB's Alpha Group, an elite counter-terrorism unit. Translated from Russian, one of the voices in the recording says, "We should be working with Sheremet, who is a massive pain in the arse [inaudible]. We'll plant [a bomb] and so on and this fucking rat will be taken down in fucking pieces, legs in one direction, arms in the other direction. If everything [looks like] natural causes, it won't get into people's minds the same way." In addition to planting a bomb, they also discuss poisoning Sheremet.

== Awards and recognition ==
In 1995, Belarus PEN Center gave Sheremet its Adamovich Prize, naming him the best television reporter in Belarus.

In November 1998, Sheremet was awarded the International Press Freedom Award of the Committee to Protect Journalists, "an annual recognition of courageous journalism". Because Sheremet was denied permission to travel to New York City to attend the scheduled ceremony with fellow winners Ruth Simon, Goenawan Mohamad, Gustavo Gorriti, and Grémah Boucar, the CPJ held a special ceremony in Minsk on 8 December to present his award.

On 22 April 2002, the Organization for Security and Co-operation in Europe Parliamentary Assembly announced Sheremet as the winner of its 2002 Prize for Journalism and Democracy, which he would share with Austrian television journalist Friedrich Orter, cited for his human rights reporting in the Balkans and Afghanistan. The award cited the pair as having "promoted OSCE principles on human rights, democracy and the unimpeded flow of information". The two split a US$20,000 prize.

== Legacy ==
In 2016 Pavel Sheremet Award was established by the Eastern Partnership Civil Society Forum in order to recognize courage in journalism and outstanding achievement in the cause of media freedom in Eastern Europe.

A Pavel Sheremet Square is located in Kyiv's Shevchenkivskyi District. A monument to Sheremet at his place of death was unveiled on 20 July 2020.

== Bibliography ==
- Piterskie tayny Vladimira Yakovleva (Russian), Hardcover – 2005, Biography of Vladimir Anatolyevich Yakovlev
- Sluchaynyy prezident (Politicheskiy portret) (Russian) Hardcover – 2003, Biography of Alexander Lukashenko

== See also ==
- Censorship in Belarus
- List of journalists killed in Ukraine
- List of people from Belarus
- List of unsolved murders (2000–present)
- Alexander Shchetinin
- Sevğil Musayeva-Borovyk
