= Zahid Krasnov =

Ukrainian businessman, politician

- Загід Краснов
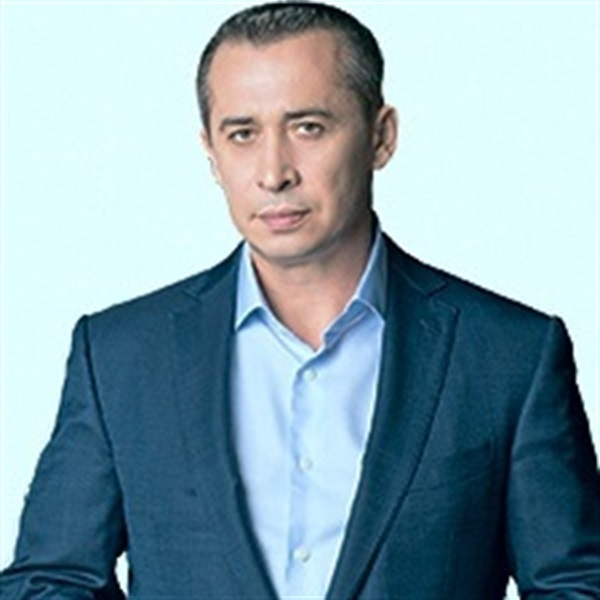
- Born: Zahiddin Habibulayevich Gabibulayev; October 24, 1965 (age 61); Belidzhi, Dagestan ASSR, Russian SFSR, Soviet Union
- Citizenship: Ukraine
- Occupations: Politician, businessman, civic activist
- Known for: Leader of Hromadska Syla

Zahid Hennadiiovych Krasnov (Ukrainian: Загід Геннадійович Краснов; born Zahiddin Habibulayevich Gabibulayev (Ukrainian: Загіддін Габібулайович Габібулаєв); 24 October 1965) is a Ukrainian pro-Russian politician, businessman, and civic activist. He is the leader of the civic organization and political party Hromadska Syla.

Krasnov has served as a member of the Dnipro City Council and has been a candidate for Mayor of Dnipro on several occasions. His political career has been the subject of extensive media coverage and investigative reporting concerning his business interests, alleged links to organized crime in the 1990s, land transactions, public procurement, and political connections with Oleg Tsaryov and Viktor Medvedchuk. He has also been criticized by Ukrainian media and political commentators for statements described as promoting pro-Russian historical narratives and for opposing aspects of Ukraine's Euro-Atlantic integration.

== Biography ==
Krasnov was born on 24 October 1965 in the settlement of Belidzhi, Derbentsky District, Dagestan ASSR, Russian Soviet Federative Socialist Republic, Soviet Union. In his official biography published by the Central Election Commission of Ukraine, he listed his place of birth as Baku, Azerbaijan SSR (now Azerbaijan).

In 1983, he graduated from Secondary School No. 2 in Belidzhi, Dagestan ASSR. He has practiced martial arts since the seventh grade.

In 1983, Krasnov moved to Dnipropetrovsk and enrolled at the Dnipropetrovsk Institute of Civil Engineering. From 1984 to 1986, he completed his compulsory military service in the Soviet Army, serving in the Strategic Missile Forces of the 2nd Guards Motor Rifle Division.

In 1986, he resumed his studies at the Dnipropetrovsk Institute of Civil Engineering, graduating in 1990 with a degree in civil engineering. After graduation, he intended to join the KGB and completed the required selection procedures; however, the dissolution of the Soviet Union prevented his recruitment. Following graduation, he worked for one year as a martial arts instructor. According to Krasnov, his martial arts background led business partners to invite him into private business.

During the 1990s, Krasnov officially headed the Association of Entrepreneurs of Dnipropetrovsk. According to journalist investigations published by Obozrevatel, his activities during this period were allegedly connected with racketeering and later with debt collection. During this period he also adopted the name Zahid. After taking his wife's surname, Zahiddin became known as "Krasnov".

Krasnov married in Dagestan on 23 October 1992. His wife is Elvira Shakhveledovna Gabibullayeva.

On 3 September 2001, Krasnov and his wife legally changed their surname, patronymic, and given names, while his wife's first name remained unchanged. It remains unclear how the couple was able to change their patronymics, as Ukrainian legislation made such changes virtually impossible until amendments adopted in 2021.

In 2005, Krasnov graduated from the Humanitarian University "Zaporizhzhia Institute of State and Municipal Administration" (now part of the Classic Private University) with a degree in law, qualifying as a lawyer. In 2016, he graduated from the Dnipropetrovsk Regional Institute of Public Administration of the National Academy for Public Administration under the President of Ukraine.

=== Allegations of criminal ties and controversies in the 1990s ===
According to an investigative report by Obozrevatel, Krasnov (then known by his birth surname, Habibulayev) was associated with the criminal underworld of Dnipropetrovsk during the 1990s. Media reports linked him to the criminal group headed by Mukhtar Magomedov ("Mukhtar"), alleging that he acquired the nickname "Zahid" during this period and was involved in racketeering (including at the Nahirnyi Market), providing protection to businesses, and exercising control over prostitution, drug trafficking, and armed groups. Following the killing of Mukhtar during the so-called "Dnipropetrovsk gang war" in the early 2000s, media reports alleged that Krasnov assumed leadership of part of the organization. No publicly available court judgments have found him guilty of criminal offences related to these allegations; however, media reports have stated that he appeared in police records as a member of an organized criminal group. Krasnov has denied these allegations.

In 2012, Krasnov was detained on suspicion of involvement in a 2008 traffic collision on Zavodska Naberezhna in Dnipro. According to prosecutors, his Porsche Cayenne exceeded the speed limit and collided with another vehicle, leaving its driver with serious bodily injuries. The criminal case was subsequently closed due to a finding that no crime had been committed.

=== Family ties to Russia ===
Krasnov's brother, Ramiz Gabibulayev, has served for many years as the head of the administration of the settlement of Belidzhi in Dagestan. Since at least 2011, he has also been a member of the Russian political party United Russia.

According to RBC-Ukraine, in 2024 Gabibulayev participated in a ceremony honoring Russian serviceman Muslim Muslimov, who had been awarded the title Hero of the Russian Federation for his role in the Battle of Avdiivka (2023–2024). On 26 March 2026, Gabibulayev also became a deputy of the People's Assembly of the Republic of Dagestan.

Krasnov has stated that he maintains contact with his brother and other relatives in Dagestan. According to statements published on his official website, he and his brother continued to visit one another after the outbreak of the Russo-Ukrainian War in 2014.

According to Krasnov, his son, Ruslan Krasnov, a deputy of the Dnipropetrovsk Oblast Council, has also visited relatives in Moscow and Dagestan.

== Political career ==
From April to October 2004, Krasnov served as Chief Consultant of the Organizational Control Department of the Coordination Committee for Combating Corruption and Organized Crime under the President of Ukraine, during the presidency of Leonid Kuchma.

Krasnov later became the leader of Hromada, the political party founded by Pavlo Lazarenko. In the 2006 Ukrainian local elections, the party won seats in the Dnipropetrovsk City Council. With the support of Party of Regions Member of Parliament Oleg Tsaryov, Krasnov formed a governing coalition in the city council together with the Party of Regions, the Viche faction, the People's Opposition Bloc of Natalia Vitrenko, and the Communist Party of Ukraine. Since 2006, he has headed the Lazarenko Bloc faction in the Dnipropetrovsk City Council.

Between 2007 and 2010, Krasnov led the "Ridnyi Dnipropetrovsk" ("Native Dnipropetrovsk") coalition in the Dnipropetrovsk City Council. In July 2010, he announced his candidacy for Mayor of Dnipropetrovsk. Following the withdrawal of Ihor Tsyrkin from the race, Krasnov became one of the principal challengers to incumbent mayor Ivan Kulichenko. On 30 September 2010, he was officially nominated for mayor by the city organization of Our Ukraine. Krasnov also served as the head of Serhiy Tihipko's presidential campaign in Dnipropetrovsk.

According to media reports, in the summer of 2012 Krasnov joined Ukrainian Choice, the political movement founded by Viktor Medvedchuk. During the Revolution of Dignity in 2014, the same reports alleged that he initially organized groups of Titushky before later positioning himself in opposition to the government and expressing support for Right Sector and the Svoboda party.

In 2014, Krasnov was a candidate in the snap parliamentary election to the Verkhovna Rada.

In the 2010 Dnipropetrovsk mayoral election, held on 31 October 2010, Krasnov finished fourth behind Ivan Kulichenko, Andriy Pavelko, and Sviatoslav Oliinyk. Because his political party, Hromadska Syla, was denied registration for the election, its members ran on the list of the People's Order party, which failed to win representation in the city council.

Krasnov again ran for Mayor of Dnipropetrovsk in the 2015 Ukrainian local elections, receiving 12.42% of the vote and finishing third. His party, Hromadska Syla, won seven seats in the Dnipropetrovsk City Council, receiving approximately 11% of the vote.

In the 2020 Ukrainian local elections, Krasnov received 13.2% of the vote in the first round of the mayoral election, narrowly outperforming Oleksandr Vilkul, who received 13.0%. In the runoff election held on 22 November 2020, he received 18.8% of the vote, losing to incumbent mayor Borys Filatov, who won with 78.1%.

=== Cooperation with Oleg Tsaryov ===
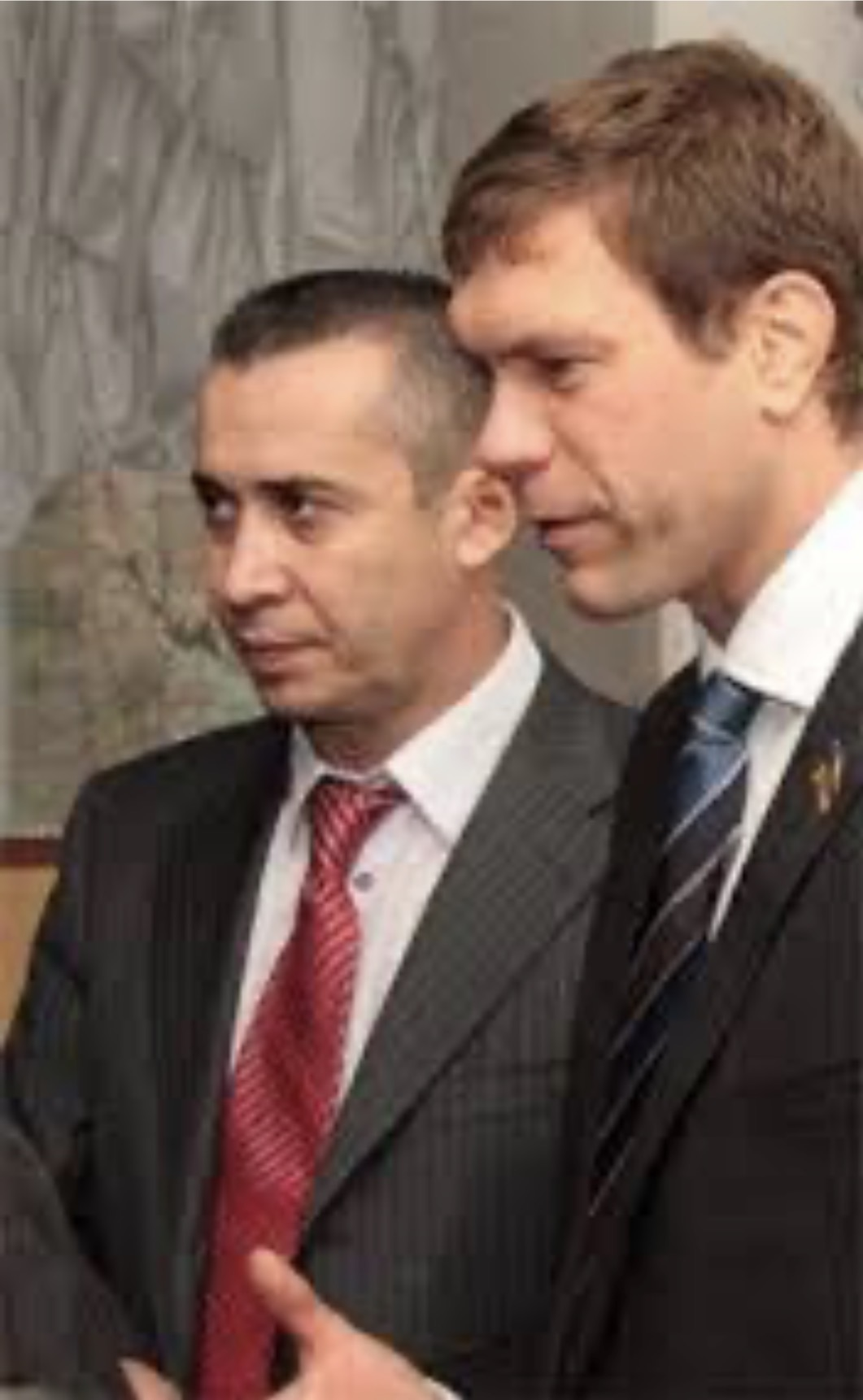
Zahid Krasnov and Oleg Tsaryov

During the second half of the 2000s, Krasnov cooperated in the Dnipropetrovsk City Council with Oleg Tsaryov, then a member of the Party of Regions and later a collaborator with Russia.

Following the 2006 local elections, the Hromada faction led by Krasnov joined the governing majority formed with the participation of the Party of Regions. Several Ukrainian media outlets described the relationship between Krasnov and Tsaryov as a political and business partnership, reporting that they jointly influenced the formation of the governing majority in the city council and appointments to senior municipal positions.

According to media investigations, in 2005 Krasnov and Tsaryov, through a company known as the "Children's Sports and Recreation School of the Olympic Reserve", obtained more than 36 hectares of land in the Sonyachnyi residential district of Dnipropetrovsk. Although the project was officially presented as the construction of a sports complex, journalists reported that a substantial part of the land was intended for commercial development, including hotels, parking facilities, and other commercial properties.

Journalists also reported that the company's original founders included Krasnov's wife, Elvira Krasnova. She was later replaced by Oksana Haleta and Oleksii Permiakov, whom the media described as being connected with the business interests of Krasnov and Tsaryov. According to these reports, the formal change of ownership did not affect the project's actual control.

The same investigation reported that Permiakov was a co-founder of the companies Pioner Plus and Anel, as well as Krasnov's civic organization Hromadska Syla. Oksana Haleta was also reported to have participated in the activities of the companies Megapolis-Stroy and Arka, which journalists linked to Krasnov's business circle. Obozrevatel further reported that the cooperation between Krasnov and Tsaryov extended beyond this single project. According to the publication, businessmen Oleksii Permiakov, Oleksandr Datsenko, and Andrii Panchenko, who were described as being associated with Tsaryov's business interests, also became founders of Krasnov's civic organization Hromadska Syla. Journalists stated that these individuals participated in numerous companies connected with both politicians.

According to Ukrainian media reports, the political alliance between Krasnov and Tsaryov after the 2006 local elections gave them considerable influence over the Dnipropetrovsk City Council. Obozrevatel described the two politicians as a "close business tandem" that exercised extensive influence over decisions concerning municipal land allocation and city-owned property. In 2016, iPress likewise referred to Krasnov as Tsaryov's "long-time business partner" when describing their joint activities in the Dnipropetrovsk City Council.

During the 2010 Ukrainian presidential election campaign, several media outlets reported that Krasnov headed the Dnipropetrovsk campaign headquarters of presidential candidate Serhiy Tihipko, while Tsaryov, despite remaining one of the leaders of the regional organization of the Party of Regions, also supported Tihipko contrary to his party's official position. The publications stated that this decision had been coordinated by Krasnov and Tsaryov.

Following the Revolution of Dignity and Tsaryov's subsequent pro-Russian activities, Ukrainian media revisited his previous political ties, including his cooperation with Krasnov.

=== Links to Viktor Medvedchuk ===
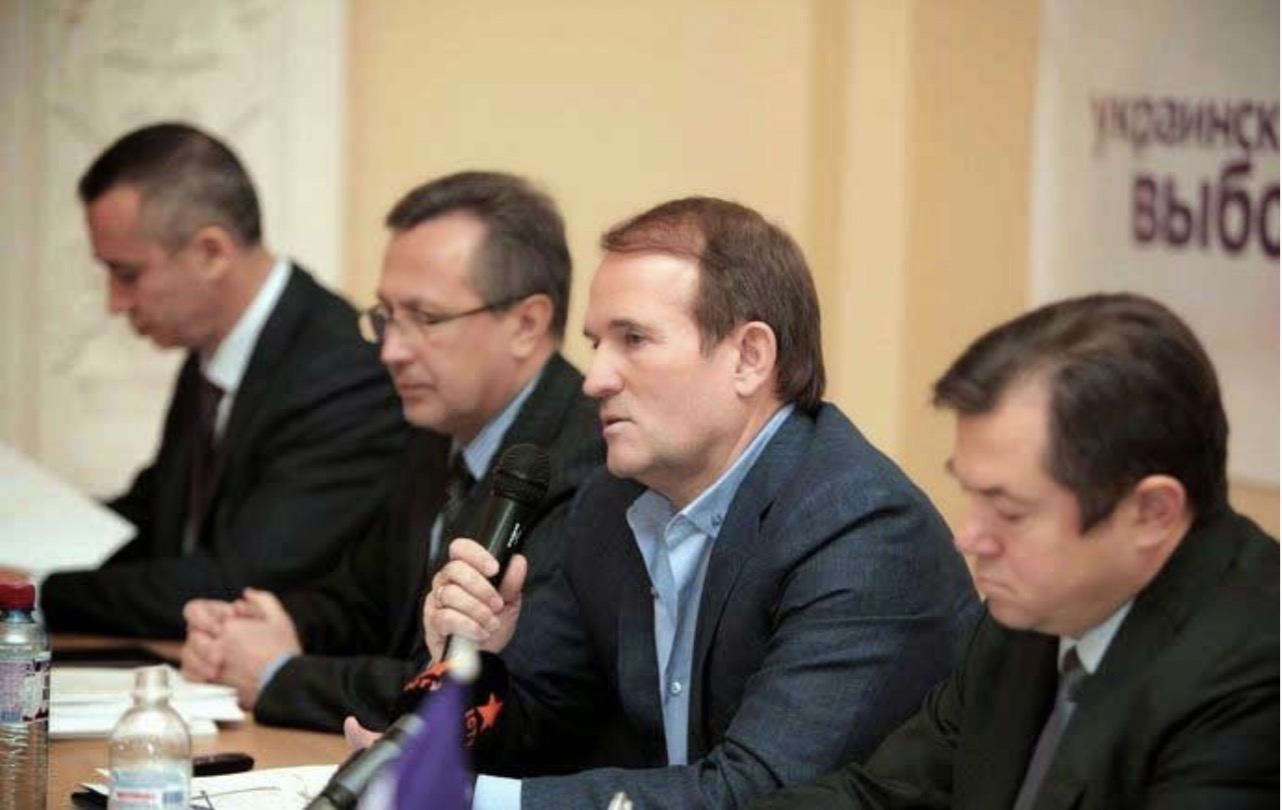
Zahid Krasnov and Viktor Medvedchuk during a meeting of the Ukrainian Choice public movement

In 2012, Krasnov joined Ukrainian Choice, a public movement founded and led by Viktor Medvedchuk, a Ukrainian politician widely regarded as pro-Russian and known as the godfather of Russian President Vladimir Putin's daughter.

During the 2020 Ukrainian local elections and in the following years, Ukrainian journalists and political commentators drew attention to Krasnov's political and media contacts with organizations associated with Medvedchuk, who at the time served as chairman of the political council of the pro-Russian party Opposition Platform — For Life. The Chesno movement included Krasnov in its publication "Local deputies, a priest and media figures: who participated in Medvedchuk's political projects", which examined individuals involved in political initiatives associated with Medvedchuk over the years.

According to monitoring by the Chesno movement and other Ukrainian media outlets, during the 2020 campaign for the Dnipro City Council Krasnov was a frequent guest on the pro-Russian television channels 112 Ukraine, NewsOne, and ZIK. At the time, these broadcasters were widely reported to be associated with Medvedchuk through Member of Parliament Taras Kozak. During his appearances, Krasnov criticized the central government, expressed support for restoring economic cooperation with Russia, opposed certain aspects of Ukraine's decommunization and language policies, and spoke positively of Medvedchuk's role in negotiations over prisoner exchanges between Ukraine and Russia.

== Investigative reporting ==
=== Investigations into Hromadska Syla ===
The civic organization and political party Hromadska Syla, founded by Krasnov, has been the subject of several investigations by Ukrainian journalists concerning land allocation schemes, alleged manipulation of public opinion through staged opinion polls, the use of administrative resources, the protection of business interests through political activity, and the use of charitable organizations for political purposes.

According to journalists and civic activists, some charitable renovation projects publicly attributed by Hromadska Syla to its own funding were either financed from the municipal budget or could not be verified.

LB.ua also published documents described as Krasnov's campaign strategy during the 2010 mayoral campaign. According to the publication, the strategy proposed the use of imitation opinion polls, "preliminary elections", and staged public events intended to demonstrate public support. Critics alleged that civic organizations affiliated with Hromadska Syla were used as instruments of political campaigning and public opinion manipulation.

While Krasnov's political faction exercised significant influence in the Dnipro City Council, the organization was also criticized for allegedly facilitating the expansion of unauthorized kiosk trading. Dnipro mayor Borys Filatov later referred to the widespread installation of kiosks during previous administrations as part of corrupt practices involving municipal property.

Investigations by Chesno, Bihus.Info, and other media outlets also examined charitable foundations associated with Hromadska Syla, including Sonechnyi and Dzherelo Maibutnoho. According to the reports, these organizations distributed publicly funded social assistance while the party itself reported little or no financial activity in its official disclosures.

=== Ukrzaliznytsia procurement ===
Companies linked by journalists to Krasnov have repeatedly appeared in investigations concerning procurement contracts awarded by Ukrzaliznytsia.

In 2016, Nashi Hroshi reported that the state enterprise Ukrzaliznychpostach had awarded contracts worth more than UAH 220 million to Dniprozaliznychpostach. According to the investigation, the company purchased products from the Dnipropetrovsk Switch Works, which journalists associated with Krasnov, before reselling them to the state enterprise at substantially higher prices. The publication estimated the price difference at approximately UAH 37 million and noted that the investigation was based on a ruling of the Pecherskyi District Court concerning possible embezzlement of public funds through inflated procurement prices.

A subsequent investigation published in 2017 alleged that rail fastening systems supplied by the Zaporizhzhia Reinforced Concrete Sleeper Plant, of which Krasnov was a co-owner, had been sold to Ukrzaliznytsia at prices significantly higher than those paid the previous year. The publication also noted that an earlier procurement involving similar products had become the subject of an investigation by the National Anti-Corruption Bureau of Ukraine.

In 2019, Nashi Hroshi reported that several procurement tenders issued by Ukrzaliznytsia appeared to contain technical specifications corresponding to products manufactured by the Dnipropetrovsk Switch Works. The publication also noted that similar tender requirements had previously been ruled anti-competitive by the Antimonopoly Committee of Ukraine.

=== Outdoor advertising market ===
In 2019, Bihus.Info published an investigation into the outdoor advertising market in Dnipro. The investigation identified the company Sill as the city's largest outdoor advertising operator and linked it to Krasnov. According to the report, Krasnov's son, Ruslan Krasnov, was a co-owner of Sill and Alesan, while several other advertising companies were also associated with the Krasnov family.

According to Bihus.Info, these companies controlled a substantial share of Dnipro's outdoor advertising market, resulting in a high concentration of advertising assets among a small number of politically connected businesses.

In December 2019, Nashi Hroshi reported that Ukrainian courts had ruled unlawful several decisions of the executive committee of the Zaporizhzhia City Council concerning the transfer of advertising structures to companies that journalists associated with Krasnov's business circle.

In June 2026, several Ukrainian media outlets reported that companies linked by journalists to Krasnov were seeking more than UAH 130 million in compensation from the Dnipro municipal budget through court proceedings related to dismantled advertising structures and advertising at public transport shelters.

== Pro-Russian positions and statements ==
Krasnov has been accused by Ukrainian journalists and political opponents of promoting pro-Russian and Soviet historical narratives and has been criticized for his political and business associations with individuals who supported Russia following the outbreak of the Russo-Ukrainian War. The criticism has focused on his statements concerning Ukraine's Soviet past, the Holodomor, the Ukrainian liberation movement, the formation of Ukraine's modern borders, and his previous cooperation with former Ukrainian member of parliament Oleg Tsaryov, who later supported Russia, as well as with pro-Russian politician and businessman Viktor Medvedchuk, who has close personal ties to Russian president Vladimir Putin.

=== Statements on the Soviet Union ===
In a May 2011 interview with Censor.NET concerning the use of the Soviet red flag, Krasnov supported displaying the flag during Victory Day commemorations. He stated that it was necessary to honor veterans of the Red Army and described the soldiers who fought under the red flag as heroes. Krasnov also contrasted historical memory in eastern and western Ukraine, saying that figures commemorated in western regions were regarded by some people in eastern Ukraine as "bandits".

In the same interview, Krasnov rejected the characterization of Ukraine's membership in the Soviet Union as a Soviet occupation. He stated that there had been "no occupation" and that the fifteen Soviet republics had united on the basis of a common ideology. At the same time, he described communism as a utopian ideology and said that he did not support a return to the totalitarian past. In 2026, Dnipro Operatyvnyi characterized these statements as reproducing Soviet and Russian historical narratives.

Krasnov also argued that Ukraine had gained more territory than any other Soviet republic from its membership in the Soviet Union. He referred to Crimea and parts of the Donbas as Soviet "gifts" to Ukraine and stated that those who regarded the Soviet Union as an occupying power should, by the same logic, renounce territories transferred to Ukraine by the Soviet authorities. Following the beginning of Russian aggression against Ukraine, the claim that Crimea had been "gifted" to Ukraine became a recurring argument in Russian state narratives. Ukrainian media reviewing Krasnov's earlier interview noted similarities between his statements and later claims made by Russian officials.

=== Views on the Holodomor and the Ukrainian independence movement ===
Commenting on the Holodomor, Krasnov stated that President Viktor Yushchenko had raised the issue in order to "take a jab at Russia" and attract support from voters in western Ukraine. He acknowledged that the Holodomor had occurred and supported commemorating its victims, but argued that responsibility lay with the Soviet regime and with Joseph Stalin personally, rather than with Russia as a state. In his view, attributing responsibility to Russia solely because the Soviet government was based in Moscow was politically motivated.

Regarding the Ukrainian liberation movement, Krasnov said that residents of eastern Ukraine should not be compelled to accept Roman Shukhevych as a national hero. At the same time, he stated that the compulsory display of Soviet symbols in communities whose residents had fought in the Organization of Ukrainian Nationalists and the Ukrainian Insurgent Army against the Red Army would further deepen social divisions. In January 2026, journalists reviewing the interview characterized these statements as reflecting pro-Russian historical narratives concerning the Holodomor, the Soviet period, and the Ukrainian independence movement.

=== Views on Russia, NATO, and Ukraine's foreign policy ===
During a 2016 election campaign, Krasnov referred to Russia's aggression as a "conflict in eastern Ukraine" and supported implementation of the Minsk agreements, stating that the conflict required an immediate peaceful resolution. He attributed the absence of such a settlement to what he described as a lack of political will on the part of the Ukrainian government.

In September 2018, during an appearance on NewsOne, a pro-Russian television channel then associated with Medvedchuk's political network, Krasnov opposed making a decision on Ukraine's accession to NATO while the Russo-Ukrainian War was ongoing. He argued that membership in a military alliance should be decided in a national referendum, but only several years after what he described as the "conflict in eastern Ukraine" had subsided. Krasnov also stated that national security should primarily be ensured through economic development rather than membership in a military alliance.

In November 2018, during an appearance on the pro-Russian television channel NASH, Krasnov advocated a non-aligned foreign-policy model for Ukraine, citing Finland as an example. He argued that an economically developed and internally consolidated state could provide for its security without joining NATO.

In another television appearance, Krasnov claimed that corruption in Ukraine benefited both the United States and the European Union because it enabled them to influence Ukrainian politicians. In a separate broadcast, he stated that Russia and the United States both violated international law, using the comparison as an argument against Ukraine joining NATO.

In November 2018, Krasnov also stated that Ukraine should "negotiate with Donbas". During the same television appearance, he compared Russian and American policies toward Ukraine, arguing that both countries acted primarily in pursuit of their own interests.

In March 2019, during an appearance on NewsOne, Krasnov supported restoring direct purchases of natural gas from Russia. He argued that gas purchased by Ukraine from European suppliers was originally of Russian origin and that a direct contract could reduce its price. In other television appearances, he criticized the reduction of economic ties with Russia, claiming that it had harmed the Ukrainian economy.

== Incidents ==
=== Criminal proceedings following a traffic collision ===
On 11 May 2012, Krasnov was detained on suspicion of involvement in a fatal traffic collision that had occurred in 2008 on Naberezhna Zavodska Street in Dnipropetrovsk. Criminal proceedings were reopened at the same time.

The collision involved Krasnov's Porsche and another passenger vehicle, whose driver died. Krasnov was subsequently released subject to a written undertaking not to leave his place of residence.

The proceedings were later closed on the grounds that no criminal offence had been established, and the allegations against Krasnov were withdrawn.

== Assessments of political activity ==
Krasnov's political activity has been the subject of commentary by Ukrainian journalists and political analysts. In 2010, the online publication LB.ua published an article titled "The End of the Taiga Emperor", which portrayed Krasnov as a politician who had repeatedly changed political affiliations and allies.

The article described him as a "political weather vane" and noted that over the course of several years he had cooperated with a number of different political projects. According to the publication, Krasnov had been associated with the Yulia Tymoshenko Bloc, supported the Orange political camp during the 2004 Ukrainian presidential election, headed the Lazarenko Bloc faction in the Dnipropetrovsk City Council, and, ahead of the 2010 Ukrainian presidential election, presented himself as the head of Serhiy Tihipko's campaign in Dnipropetrovsk Oblast.

The same publication alleged that Krasnov used Tihipko's presidential campaign to advance his own political profile and publicly portrayed himself as Tihipko's representative in the region. According to the article's author, Tihipko did not publicly confirm that Krasnov had been officially authorized to represent his interests in Dnipropetrovsk Oblast.

LB.ua also criticized Krasnov's use of advertising slogans such as "Krasnov convinced the minister" and "Europe is backing Krasnov", reporting that the officials referred to in the advertisements had not confirmed the claims attributed to them.

== Business interests and assets ==
According to his public asset declarations, Krasnov has business interests in the railway manufacturing, renewable energy, real estate, and media sectors. His declared assets have included shareholdings in the Zaporizhzhia Reinforced Concrete Sleeper Plant and the Dnipropetrovsk Switch Works, as well as interests in solar energy projects operated by Ecoenergoservis Dnipro. According to corporate records, Krasnov is also associated through related persons with a number of companies operating primarily in the real estate sector.

Media reports have described Krasnov as the beneficial owner of the Informator media holding, which includes the Informator news website and radio station in Dnipro, as well as the Ukraine Now Telegram channel network.

According to annual asset declarations and investigative reporting, Krasnov and members of his family own substantial real estate holdings, land, corporate rights, and other assets.

His 2025 asset declaration reported that Krasnov, together with his wife Elvira and son Ruslan, owned a 1,258.4 m² residence in Dnipro situated on three adjoining land plots near Obukhivka. Adjacent to the property is a 5.4-hectare municipally owned parcel leased by the Lisnyi service cooperative, of which Krasnov is a member. According to an investigation by Dnipro.media, the cooperative's fenced territory effectively restricted access to the bank of the Dnipro River. Legal experts interviewed by the publication argued that this arrangement could be inconsistent with the requirements of Ukraine's Water Code.

The same investigation reported that in 2018 Krasnov's wife, Elvira Krasnova, acquired approximately 40 hectares of land in the village of Liubymivka over a three-month period. According to the report, most of the parcels had previously been transferred free of charge to local councillors and individuals associated with Hromadska Syla before subsequently being acquired by Krasnova. Experts interviewed by the publication stated that any potential legal violations would likely have occurred during the initial transfer of municipal land into private ownership rather than during the subsequent purchases.

As of 2025, Krasnov's wife also declared ownership of a 65.19 m² apartment in France, acquired in 2023. The family's asset declaration further listed significant financial assets, corporate rights, domestic and foreign bank accounts, and luxury movable property, including Breguet watches.

In April 2026, Dnipro.media reported that the family's declared assets had grown substantially in recent years through the acquisition of additional real estate, land, and corporate rights, while noting that a significant proportion of these assets was registered in the names of Krasnov's family members.
