= Oleh Voloshyn =

Ukrainian politician (born 1981)

- Олег Волошин
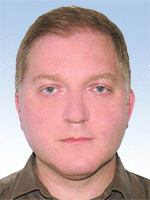

People's Deputy of Ukraine
- In office 25 August 2019 – 24 February 2023

Personal details
- Born: Oleh Anatoliiovych Voloshyn; 7 April 1981 (age 45) Mykolaiv, Ukrainian SSR, Soviet Union
- Citizenship: Ukraine
- Party: Opposition Platform — For Life
- Education: Institute of International Relations at Taras Shevchenko University
- Known for: Former spokesperson for a department of the Foreign Ministry of Ukraine

Oleh Anatoliiovych Voloshyn (Ukrainian: Олег Анатолійович Волошин, Russian: Олег Анатольевич Волошин, romanized: Oleg Anatolyevich Voloshyn; born 7 April 1981, Mykolaiv) is a Russian and formerly Ukrainian journalist, political pundit on 112 Ukraine, politician, and former government official under Ukrainian prime ministers Mykola Azarov and Viktor Yanukovych.

He was a presidential attaché in the former Embassy of Ukraine in Moscow, Russia. He was the spokesman and director for the Information Department of the Foreign Ministry of Ukraine from 2010 to 2013. He was a people's deputy of the Verkhovna Rada, Ukraine's parliament, elected in the elections in 2019, until his mandate was, at his own request, revoked in February 2023.

In February 2023 Voloshyn was formally accused of treason for he allegedly "promoted the military-political leadership of the Russian Federation in subversive activities against Ukraine."

== Biography ==
Voloshyn graduated from Taras Shevchenko National University of Kyiv's Institute of International Relations in 2003. From 2005 to 2008 he had a journalistic career.

From 2008 to 2019 Voloshyn was a presidential attaché in the former Embassy of Ukraine in Moscow, Russia.

From 2010 to 2013 Voloshyn was the Director of the Information Policy Department of the Ministry of Foreign Affairs of Ukraine.

In the 2015 Kyiv local election, as a candidate for Opposition Bloc, Voloshyn failed to win a seat in the Kyiv city council. Opposition Bloc failed to overcome the election threshold.

In 2015 Voloshin became a journalist of Vesti. Reporter.

Voloshin is alleged to have been a Ukrainian business partner of Paul Manafort and to have ties to Russian intelligence agencies; prosecutors in the 2017 Special Counsel investigation, led by former director of the FBI Robert Mueller into Russian interference in the 2016 United States elections, alleged that he and Manafort had worked on an op-ed piece in the Kyiv Post praising Manafort's efforts in strengthening European Union–Ukraine relations while Manafort was out on bail, which prosecutors claim was written in order to boost public opinion of Manafort in Ukraine. Voloshyn, however, claims that he wrote the op-ed piece, emailing a version of the rough draft of the op-ed to colleague Konstantin Kilimnik. As a result, in early December 2017, a court filing requested that the judge revoke Manafort's bond agreement.

On 20 June 2019, it was announced that Voloshyn would be on the electoral list of the Opposition Platform — For life party for the 2019 Ukrainian parliamentary election. He was elected into the Verkhovna Rada (parliament) in this election as number 30 on the party list. At the time Voloshyn worked for the Ukrainian TV channel 112 Ukraine.

As a political pundit, he has made claims that there is a "growing volume of obvious violations of the rights of journalists, opposition, religious organizations, national minorities." He considers himself a defender of the Russian language in Ukraine. On the Russian military intervention in Ukraine, he has stated that "the Russian Federation is struggling to hold Ukraine in its sphere of influence, and not for its transformation into another province [of Russia]" and argues that "in Russia there was no overall goal to occupy Ukraine", that in general, "Ukraine is now governed by Washington."

In July 2020 Voloshyn was doused with a green liquid close to the Verkhovna Rada building after claiming in parliament that Ukraine could not retake sovereignty over Russian annexed Crimea given that (according to Voloshyn) Ukraine was "given entirely to external governance." At the time fellow MPs addressed the head of the Ukrainian secret service Ivan Bakanov with a demand to initiate criminal proceedings (against Voloshyn).

=== U.S. investigation and sanctions ===
In July 2021, upon his arrival in the U.S., he was pulled away at Dulles International Airport by FBI agents for a three-hour long questioning session; according to Voloshyn, the agents also extracted the information from his cellphone.

On 20 January 2022, against the backdrop of mounting tensions between Russia and Ukraine, the U.S. government imposed sanctions on Voloshyn along with three other Ukrainian nationals. The statement released by the U.S. Department of the Treasury said, "Russia has directed its intelligence services to recruit current and former Ukrainian government officials to prepare to take over the government of Ukraine and to control Ukraine’s critical infrastructure with an occupying Russian force. At the heart of this effort are Taras Kozak (Kozak) and Oleh Voloshyn (Voloshyn), two current Ukrainian Members of Parliament from the party led by Victor Medvedchuk (Medvedchuk), who is already subject to U.S. sanctions for his role in undermining Ukrainian sovereignty in 2014. Medvedchuk maintains close ties with the Kremlin, and also took part in directing these activities. [...] Voloshyn has worked with Russian actors to undermine Ukrainian government officials and advocate on behalf of Russia. Voloshyn also worked with U.S.-designated Konstantin Kilimnik, a Russian national with ties to Russian intelligence who was sanctioned for attempts to influence the U.S. 2020 presidential election, to coordinate passing on information to influence U.S. elections at the behest of Russia."

He was sanctioned by Canada on 24 February 2022 and by the UK government on 24 March 2022 in relation to the Russo-Ukrainian War.

=== State treason accusation and loss of parliamentary seat ===
Voloyshyn left Ukraine 10 days before the 24 February 2022 Russian invasion of Ukraine. According to the Ukrainian newspaper Lb.ua Voloyshyn has Russian citizenship.

In April 2022 it was announced that Voloyshyn had joined the parliamentary faction Platform for Life and Peace after the party he was elected in parliament for, Opposition Platform — For Life, had been banned.

In January 2023 Voloshyn officially requested to be realised of his parliamentary mandate.

On 10 February 2023 Voloshyn was formally accused of treason for he allegedly "promoted the military-political leadership of the Russian Federation in subversive activities against Ukraine." According to the Security Service of Ukraine (SBU) he had been involved in manipulating Ukraine's public opinion in the interests of Russia through speeches and interviews. The SBU states Voloshyn was "hiding abroad" when the indictment was published.

Voloshyn's parliamentary mandate was revoked on 24 February 2023.

=== Bribery allegations ===
Voloshyn has been accused of overseeing a spy network which attempted to recruit members of the European Parliament. In 2025 Nathan Gill, a former MEP for the Brexit Party, pleaded guilty to accepting bribes from Voloshyn to make pro-Russian statements on eight occasions in 2018 and 2019. Prosecutors claimed that Voloshyn had been acting on behalf of Viktor Medvedchuk when he bribed Gill. Searchlight reported at the time of Gill's connection that he and Voloshyn were connected to an NGO founded by alleged Russian spy Janusz Niedźwiecki which attempted to recruit several MEPs to advance Russia's agenda in Europe. Investigators in Poland described Voloshyn as "the main man" in the spy network run by Niedźwiecki.

After Gill's conviction, WhatsApp messages between him and Voloshyn were disclosed in which Voloshyn discussed paying bribes to another MEP, variously referred to as "David" and "D". BBC News claimed that David Coburn was the MEP mentioned in the WhatsApps, which Coburn denied.
