= Ruslan Kotsaba =

Ukrainian activist and blogger (born 1966)

Ruslan Petrovych Kotsaba
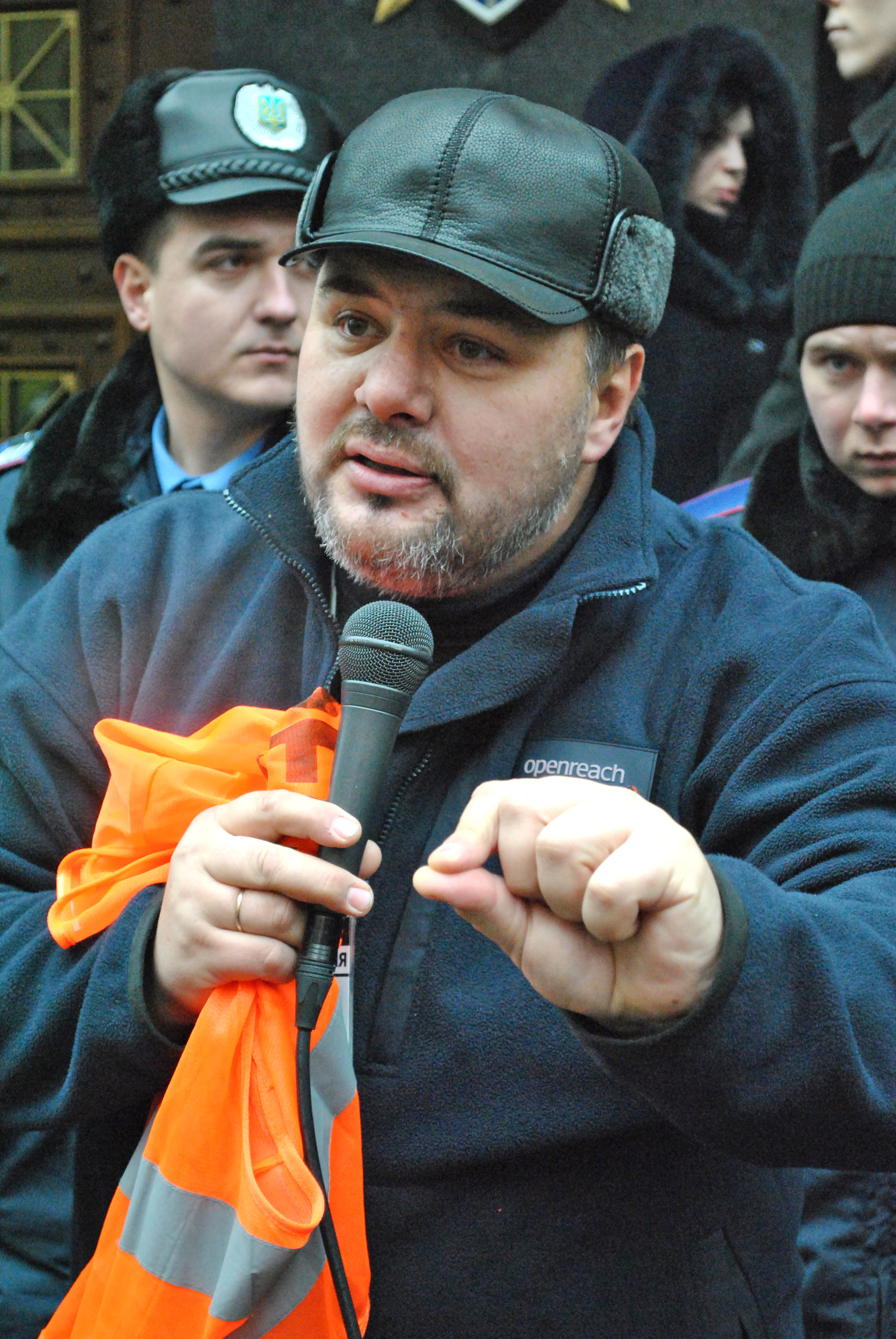
- Ruslan Kotsaba during the protests outside Ukraine Prosecutor General's Office (12 December 2013)
- Born: 18 August 1966 (age 60); Ivano-Frankivsk, Ukrainian SSR, Soviet Union
- Occupation: blogger

Ruslan Petrovych Kotsaba (Ukrainian: Руслан Петрович Коцаба; born 18 August 1966) is a Ukrainian journalist, activist, blogger and conscientious objector who has been described as a pro-Russian blogger by USA Today and as a prisoner of conscience by human rights organisations.

Kotsaba is known for his call in January 2015 to boycott the fourth wave of mobilization in Ukraine during the war in Donbas. In May 2016 he was found guilty of obstructing the activities of the armed forces and was sentenced to 3 years and 6 months imprisonment. He was acquitted by the Court of Appeal and released in July 2016 after having spent 524 days in prison. The acquittal was annulled in June 2017 and the trial was still ongoing in 2022.

As of 2022, Kotsaba is a controversial figure in his country and abroad, and has been a victim of threats and politically motivated violence.

== Early years ==
Ruslan Kotsaba was born in Ivano-Frankivsk in 1966. Ecologist by education, he graduated from the Ukrainian National Forestry University and the National Academy for Public Administration.

In the 1990s he participated in the Revolution on Granite, and during the Orange Revolution he led the regional organisation of the national-liberal Pora party. At the beginning of 2005 he joined the civic movement associated with Vladyslav Kaskiv, who was elected as a member of parliament for Our Ukraine–People's Self-Defense Bloc in 2007. As a leading exponent of the Ukrainian nationalist movement in the Ivano-Frankivsk Oblast, he was the regional chairman of the association "Memorial" named after Vasyl Stus, whose mission is preserving the memory of the victims of Soviet repressions in the Ukrainian SSR, and in 2009 he was appointed director of the local Museum of the Liberation Struggle named after Stepan Bandera.

In 2013–2014, Kotsaba was in revolutionary Kyiv filming videos and taking active part in the Euromaidan protests. He supported the Revolution of Dignity and identified with right-wing political forces.

In the summer of 2014, as a freelance correspondent of the TV channel 112 Ukraine, Kotsaba covered the course of hostilities in Donbas visiting both sides of the conflict. The experience in Donbas had a profound effect on him. He drove through the Anti-terrorist Operation Zone posting materials on his blog about Ukrainian soldiers and volunteers, in the camp of the Aidar Battalion he interviewed Nadiya Savchenko, and in Luhansk he had contacts with leaders of the self-proclaimed republic. In his reports from the Donbas he was critical of the Ukrainian armed forces, and claimed that there were "almost" no regular Russian troops in the Luhansk People's Republic — following his arrest in 2015, these claims by Kotseba were widely criticised in the Ukrainian journalist community.

At the time, Kotsaba described himself as a Ukrainian patriot and a "typical Ukrainian-speaking right-winger" ("I was on the Maidan, I am a Catholic, I respect Bandera") who did not oppose the secession of the country's eastern provinces and claimed that a "bad peace" was better than a "good war".

== The case of high treason ==
=== YouTube video "I refuse to be mobilized" ===
In mid-January 2015, on the eve of the first stage of the Fourth wave of mobilization, Kotsaba published on YouTube a video message "I refuse to be mobilized", in which he declared that he was ready to serve time in prison as long as required by law, but was not going to join the army. He claimed that there were very few Russian soldiers in the Donbas, called the war in the Donbas a "civil war" and urged all "decent people" to boycott the mobilisation. He said: "It’s better for me to serve two to five years in prison than to deliberately kill my compatriots who live in the east ... Refuse this mobilization, because this is hell, this is horror! It is impossible for people in the 21st century to kill others just because they want to live separately".

Kotsaba's public stance attracted the attention of the Russian media, and Kotsaba came specially to Moscow to participate in a television programme on Russia-1. Following Kotsaba's arrest and trial, his YouTube video received more than 400,000 views, 6000 likes and 600 dislikes.

=== Arrest and trials ===
At the end of January 2015, the Security Service of Ukraine (SBU) started a pre-trial investigation at the request of a citizen and on 7 February Kotsaba was arrested. He was charged with violating Part 1 of Art. 111 (High treason) and Part 1 of Art. 114-1 (Obstruction of the lawful activities of the armed forces of Ukraine during a special period) of the Criminal Code, and could have faced a sentence of 5 to 15 years in prison.

On 9 February 2015, Amnesty International called on the Ukrainian authorities to immediately release the journalist, and on 11 February called Kotsaba a prisoner of conscience for the first time in 5 years. Criticisms of Kotsaba's arrest were voiced also by former member of parliament from the Party of Regions Irina Berezhna, ombudsperson for human rights Valeriya Lutkovska, the Ukrainian Helsinki Human Rights Union, which called Kotsaba a "political prisoner", the Kharkiv Human Rights Protection Group, the Independent Media Trade Union of Ukraine of Ukraine, and Ukrainian writer Taras Prokhasko, who said that Kotsaba had voiced what others were afraid to admit. In December 2015, 34 members of the European Parliament signed a letter condemning the arrest of Kotsaba "simply for doing his work". In June 2016, the Unified European Left Group of the Parliamentary Assembly of the Council of Europe issued a statement calling for the immediate release of Kotsaba. In June 2017, the Kyiv regional organization of the National Union of Journalists of Ukraine awarded Kotsaba a certificate "For special merit" to express their support.

On 12 May 2016, the Ivano-Frankivsk city Court sentenced Kotsaba to 3 years and 6 months in prison. Kotsaba was acquitted of the charge of treason, but the court qualified his conduct as obstruction of the lawful actions of the armed forces of Ukraine. On 14 July 2016, the Ivano-Frankivsk region Court of Appeal declared Kotsaba innocent on all counts. Kotsaba was released from custody. In total, he had spent 524 days in custody.

On 1 June 2017, the High Specialized Court on Civil and Criminal Cases overturned the acquittal of Ruslan Kotsaba. On 31 January 2018, the case was reopened in Bohorodchany District Court, from where it was transferred to the Dolyna District Court, the Lviv region Court of Appeal, back to the Dolyna District Court, the Ivano-Frankivsk region Court of Appeal, and the Kolomyia District Court.

On 23 January 2021, the European Bureau for Conscientious Objection said that they were "shocked" by the continuation of prosecution and attacks against Kotsaba.

== Subsequent activities ==
On 18 January 2015, the TV channel 112 Ukraine announced that Kotsaba was no longer a correspondent of the channel. On 5 February 2015, the Independent Media Trade Union of Ukraine said that Kotsaba's press card had been issued by mistake.

After his acquittal and release from custody, Kotsaba was hired by Channel 17 and in 2017 started to work for the pro-Russian TV channel NewsOne, where he hosted a program called Ya tak dumayu ("I think so").

As of 2016, Kotsaba is included in the Myrotvorets database of "enemies of Ukraine".

On 12 December 2017, while interviewing passers-by for the TV channel NewsOne in the centre of Kyiv, Kotsaba was attacked by a Right Sector militant, who punched him in the face and then posted the video of the attack on his Facebook page.

In 2019, the Aachen Peace Prize association announced its intention to award the prize to Kotsaba. The nomination was met with heavy criticism when a 2011 video emerged in which Kotsaba, speaking from the Jewish cemetery in Ivano-Frankivsk, blamed Jews for the rise of fascism in Germany and communism in Eastern Europe ("The Jews bred Stalin and Hitler"). Kotsaba regretted the accusations of anti-Semitism and explained that his views on the issue had changed since 2011 "due to my politicisation in the context of the war in eastern Ukraine". Eventually the association's board of directors announced that it had decided against awarding the prize to Kotsaba; pending the final decision by the association on the award, Kotseba decided to forsake the accolade.

On 22 January 2021, a group of anti-separatist activists organised a picket in front of the court in Kolomyia, where Kotsaba's case was being discussed. A scuffle broke out between the demonstrators, Kotsaba and his lawyer, Tetiana Montian. Kotsaba was sprayed with a fire extinguisher. Nationalists from the far-right paramilitary organisation Trident issued a statement promising to punish Kotsaba with their own hands, if the judicial system does not work.

On 25 June 2021, Kotsaba was the victim of a Zelyonka attack. While exiting from a train at the Ivano-Frankivsk station, he was targeted with a brilliant green dye (zelenka) thrown on his face that caused chemical burns to his eyes. Kotsaba said that one of the attackers was a leader of Right Sector, and Trident claimed responsibility for the aggression.

Following the Russian invasion of Ukraine in February 2022, Kotsaba published a post on social media stating that "Putin and Zelenskyy are murderers if they do not immediately agree on an urgent meeting for peace talks".

In October 2022 Kotseba fled Ukraine and secured temporary political asylum in the United States.

In April 2023 Kotsaba joined the "Different Ukraine" movement created in Russia by pro-Putin and pro-Russian Ukrainian exile Viktor Medvedchuk. This organisation claims that Ukraine is ruled by Nazis and repeats other Russian disinformation.

In December 2023, Kotsaba was expelled from the Ukrainian Pacifist Movement, an organisation he had chaired in the past, for refusing to participate in non-violent resistance to Russian aggression.
