= Taras Kozak =

Ukrainian politician, businessman, and media proprietor

- Тарас Козак
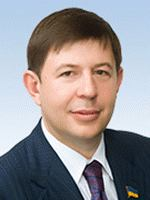
- Official portrait of Taras Kozak

People's Deputy of Ukraine
- In office 27 November 2014 – 29 August 2019
- In office 29 August 2019 – 13 January 2023 (terminated)

Personal details
- Born: April 6, 1972 (age 54) Sokilnyky, Lviv Oblast, Ukrainian SSR, Soviet Union
- Citizenship: Russia
- Party: Opposition Bloc; Opposition Platform — For Life
- Education: Lviv National Agrarian University; University of Lviv
- Occupation: politician, entrepreneur

Taras Romanovych Kozak (Ukrainian: Тарас Романович Козак; born 6 April 1972) is a pro-Russian Ukrainian politician, state servant, businessman and media proprietor, and a close associate of the pro-Russian oligarch Viktor Medvedchuk. He was elected in the 2014 Ukrainian parliamentary election as a People's Deputy of the 8th convocation for the pro-Russian Opposition Bloc party. In 2019, he was elected a People's Deputy of Ukraine of 9th convocation for the now banned pro-Russian Opposition Platform — For Life party.

In June 2019, Kozak created the media holding Novyny (lit. 'news'), which includes the NewsOne, ZIK and 112 Ukraine TV channels, which have been shut down under accusations of hosting Russian propaganda. On 2 February 2021 the National Security and Defense Council of Ukraine imposed sanctions on Kozak, with the reason given for the sanctions being that according to the Security Service of Ukraine investigation, Kozak controlled a group of coal mines in the Donetsk and Luhansk regions not under government control whose profits contributed to the financing of terrorism, as well as being implicated in the use of profits from the Samara-Western Direction oil product pipeline to fund the Donetsk People's Republic and the Luhansk People's Republic.

On 11 May 2021 the Prosecutor General of Ukraine accused Kozak of treason and attempted looting of national resources in (Russian annexed, but internationally recognised as Ukrainian) Crimea; he is believed to be in Belarus and the Security Service of Ukraine received permission to detain Kozak on 20 May 2021. On 20 January 2022, the United States Department of the Treasury sanctioned Kozak for acting under the direction of Russian Federal Security Service (FSB) agents and helping “to prepare to take over the government of Ukraine and to control Ukraine’s critical infrastructure with an occupying Russian force."

In January 2023 Kozak was stripped of his Ukrainian citizenship and his term as People's Deputy of Ukraine was terminated.

== Biography ==
In 1993–2003, Kozak worked in the State Tax Administration and in 2003-2010 in the State Customs Service. One of Kozak's colleagues in the Lviv tax office was Serhiy Medvedchuk, Viktor Medvedchuk's brother. In 2005 Kozak was a member of political party Russko-Ukrainskiy Soyuz that ran for parliament as part of the Natalia Vitrenko Bloc. In 2010 he became a deputy in the Lviv Oblast council The same year he became deputy head of the NGO "Legal State Center", this organization was headed by Viktor Medvedchuk.

As a nonpartisan candidate he took part in the 2012 Ukrainian parliamentary election in Ukraine's 122nd electoral district, around the city of Yavoriv in Lviv Oblast. He finished second, with 36.55% of the vote (the winner, Vasyl Pazynyak of Fatherland, received 55.87%).

In the 2014 Ukrainian parliamentary election Kozak became a people's deputy representing Opposition Bloc (he was number 14 on its election list). And after the 2019 Ukrainian parliamentary election for Opposition Platform — For Life (this time as number 10 on its election list, in the same election Medvedchuk was elected to parliament for the same party).

Taras Kozak is a member of political organization "Ukrainskiy vybor" led by Viktor Medvedchuk.

In 2018 Kozak voted against the Law on Recognition of Ukrainian Sovereignty over the Occupied Territories of Donetsk and Luhansk Oblasts.

At the end of 2018 Kozak acquired several important Ukrainian television media such as NewsOne (from Yevhen Muraev) and 112 Ukraine. In June 2019 Kozak also bought television channel ZIK. After acquiring of ZIK by Kozak, journalists en masse left the company in protest. After the acquisition of ZIK TV channel, the CEO left and most of the other employees resigned. The reason was the person of the new owner. The activities and rhetoric of the deputy, the party and the media holding are considered to be very biased and pro-Russian. In July 2019, employees of the ZIK TV channel, a number of newspapers, NGOs and institutions, a coalition of NGOs "Reanimation Package of Reforms" (more than 70 organizations), as well as public figures, journalists and public opinion leaders called on the state to take measures to prevent monopolization of media space by pro-Russian forces. In October 2019 Kozak was questioned by the Security Service of Ukraine because of a July 2019 proposed TV linkup between NewsOne and the Russian TV channel Rossiya 1, which is banned in Ukraine. According to ewsOne the linkup was cancelled "because of direct threats of physical reprisals leveled at the channel, journalists, and their families."

Kozak took part in a fraudulent scheme to sell anthracite from the Donetsk People's Republic and Luhansk People's Republic under the guise of coal from South Africa.

In a 2020 electronic declaration, Kozak hid his wife's oil business in Russia. The People's Deputy is also involved in the case of tax evasion by Tedis company.

On 2 February 2021 the National Security and Defense Council of Ukraine imposed sanctions on Kozak. The reason for the sanctions against Kozak were an investigation by the Security Service of Ukraine that found that coal supply schemes from the Donetsk People's Republic and Luhansk People's Republic helped finance terrorism. As part of these sanctions the television channel owned by him (NewsOne, 112 Ukraine and ZIK) were forbidden to broadcast in Ukraine. The channels were immediately shut down but continued to livestream their content on the internet. Ukrainian president Volodymyr Zelenskyy stated that banning the channels had been a difficult decision and that Ukraine supported freedom of speech but not "propaganda financed by the aggressor country." Adviser of the Office of the President of Ukraine Mykhailo Podolyak stated in Ukrainian media that the channels were “quite actively and often openly used as tools of foreign propaganda in Ukraine.” In a joint statement 112 Ukraine, NewsOne and ZiK commented on their banning: "We regard this decision...as a political reprisal against objectionable media." Russian Senator for United Russia Aleksey Pushkov claimed that "By shutting down opposition television channels, Zelensky acknowledged his inability to withstand political competition." In a written statement the spokesperson of EU's Foreign Affairs High Representative Josep Borrell stated "while Ukraine's efforts to protect its territorial integrity and national security, as well as to defend itself from information manipulation are legitimate" it added that "any measures taken should be proportional to the aim". The U.S. Embassy in Ukraine released a statement on 3 February 2020 that stated "The United States supports Ukraine’s efforts yesterday to counter Russia’s malign influence, in line with Ukrainian law, in defense of its sovereignty and territorial integrity."

Medvedchuk and Kozak were reported to keep funds in Belarusian banks controlled by business associates of President of Belarus Alexander Lukashenko, Aliaksei Aleksin and Mikalai Varabei. They also have common business interests.

=== Criminal prosecution and sanctions ===
On 11 May 2021, Kozak and Medvedchuk were named as suspects for high treason and the illegal exploitation of natural resources in Ukraine's Russian-annexed Crimea. Two days later Medvedchuk claimed in court that Kozak could not have accompanied him (in court) because he (Kozak) was receiving medical treatment in Belarus. On 20 May 2021 the Security Service of Ukraine received permission to detain Kozak.

On 20 January 2022, against the backdrop of mounting tensions over Ukraine, the U.S. government imposed sanctions on Kozak along with three other Ukrainian nationals. The statement released by the U.S. Department of the Treasury said, "Russia has directed its intelligence services to recruit current and former Ukrainian government officials to prepare to take over the government of Ukraine and to control Ukraine’s critical infrastructure with an occupying Russian force. At the heart of this effort are Taras Kozak (Kozak) and Oleh Voloshyn (Voloshyn), two current Ukrainian Members of Parliament from the party led by Victor Medvedchuk (Medvedchuk), who is already subject to U.S. sanctions for his role in undermining Ukrainian sovereignty in 2014. Medvedchuk maintains close ties with the Kremlin, and also took part in directing these activities. [...] Kozak, who controls several news channels in Ukraine, supported the FSB’s plan to denigrate senior members of Ukrainian President Volodymyr Zelenskyy’s inner circle, falsely accusing them of mismanagement of the COVID-19 pandemic. Furthermore, Kozak used his news platforms to amplify false narratives around the 2020 U.S. elections first espoused by U.S.-designated Andrii Leonidovych Derkach (Derkach). Kozak has attempted to legitimatize Derkach’s claims by rebroadcasting Derkach’s false assertions about U.S. political candidates. Throughout 2020, Kozak worked alongside FSB intelligence agents.”

Subject also to sanctions by Australia, Canada and New Zealand, on 10 January 2023, Kozak was stripped of his Ukrainian citizenship alongside his associates Medvedchuk and Derkach.

Kozak's term as People's Deputy of Ukraine was terminated by parliament on 13 January 2023.

== Awards ==
In 2002 Kozak was awarded the Order of Merit, 3rd degree.

== See also ==
- List of fugitives from justice who disappeared
