= ZIK =

Ukrainian pro-Russian TV channel

- Country: Ukraine

Programming
- Picture format: 576i 16:9 (SDTV) 1080i (HDTV)

Ownership
- Owner: Taras Kozak, formerly Petro Dyminskyi

History
- Launched: September 1, 2010
- Closed: February 26, 2021

Links
- Website: zik.ua/tv

ZIK (after the initials of Західна інформаційна корпорація - Western Information Corporation) was a pro-Russian TV channel in Ukraine. It was part of the Novyny media holding, whose unofficial owner was pro-Russian oligarch Viktor Medvedchuk (through his associate Taras Kozak).

The channel was on air from September 2010 to February 2021. The TV channels of the Novyny media holding were blocked on February 2, 2021, for anti-Ukrainian activities of its owners, Medvedchuk and Kozak, by a decree of the President of Ukraine Volodymyr Zelenskyy following a decision of the National Security and Defense Council of Ukraine. On February 26, 2021, a new TV channel, First Independent, was created on the basis of the media holding's closed TV channels – NewsOne, ZIK and 112 Ukraine – where pro-Russian journalists from the closed TV channels moved.

== History ==
The ZIK news agency was established in the summer of 2004. It is the first Internet agency in Western Ukraine. The channel first went on air on September 1, 2010. At that time, the program network had six projects of its own production. Broadcasting was carried out with a center in Lviv, mainly to Western Ukraine.

Since November 1, 2010, the channel has been broadcasting on the network of the Ivano-Frankivsk regional television "Halychyna" from 9 pm to 12 am.

Since 2014, ZIK has begun the transition to the nationwide level, expanding the line of author's projects to 20. The basis of most of them, as before, remained the genre of journalistic investigation.

On March 12-13, 2014, the channel held teleconferences with 112 Ukraine and Donbas TV channels.

The channel's projects originated from the ZIK-Lviv and ZIK-Kyiv studios (opened on May 25, 2014). In early October 2016, the official presentation of the new central ZIK studio took place in the Zhovtnevy Palace (Kyiv).

On October 3, 2016, the channel began broadcasting instead of the Dobro TV channel on the DVB-T2 network. On February 16, 2017, the channel became all-Ukrainian.

In January 2018, the channel's management announced pressure and threats, in particular from one of the people's deputies from the Popular Front, the pretext for which was an interview with the former Deputy Head of the Presidential Administration Andriy Portnov.

Until June 2019, the owner was Petro Dyminsky, later the channel was bought by politician Taras Kozak, an associate of Russian President Vladimir Putin's godfather, Viktor Medvedchuk. After the change of ownership, the channel's information policy has taken on a distinctly anti-Ukrainian, pro-Russian orientation, which has led to the resignation of a number of leading journalists.

According to Ulyana Feshchuk of the National Council for Television and Radio Broadcasting, the channel was purchased by a front person, so the Council was unable to officially link the new owner to politician Medvedchuk. Despite this, the public perceives the change of ownership as the channel's transfer under Medvedchuk's control and into the service of Russia. In particular, journalist Semen Kabakayev assessed the change of ownership as a real threat of increased Russian propaganda:

Ukrainians will not just be waiting for pro-Russian content, but also for information and psychological operations, information campaigns, and the imposition of a Russian narrative.

After the channel changed its political orientation, due to disagreement with the change of course, Olga Movchan, Roman Nedzelsky, Tetyana Vergeles, Vakhtang Kipiani and others left the channel. Kipiani wrote the following about the termination of cooperation with ZIK:

…for more than 6 years, the program “Historical Truth-ZIK” was broadcast. We made about 500 episodes. As the author and host of the program, I announce that the program is being closed. Medvedchuk is an enemy of my country, a murderer of both the past and the future.

In 2010–2019, when it was owned by Petro Dyminsky, the channel produced Ukrainian-centric content and did not cause any complaints in Ukrainian society. However, in 2019–2021, the channel’s content was described as anti-Ukrainian and pro-Russian, and it was considered one of the leading pro-Russian anti-Ukrainian TV channels in Ukraine at that time

Since June 14, 2019, the channel has been part of the media holding "Novyny", which also includes the TV channels "112 Ukraine" and "NewsOne".

On September 5, 2019, the Council on Television and Radio Broadcasting recorded violations of the law "On Television and Radio Broadcasting" on the channel's airwaves, and an unscheduled inspection of the channel was scheduled.

On May 13, 2021, the channel was fined for calls for violence against politicians on the airwaves of November 26, 2019.

== Hosts and anchors ==
- Dmitry Dobrodomov
- Iryna Sandulyak
- Vakhtang Kipiani
- Ostap Drozdov
- Anton Borkovsky
- Denys Bigus
- Ulyana Antonyk
- Serhiy Barashevsky
- Vitaly Zemlyanko
- Olga Gerych
- Oksana Rospopa
- Yulia Sivakova
- Lilia Kish
- Bogdan Voloshyn
- Oleg Mikhalchuk
- Roman Hrynyshyn
- Oksana Marunyak
- Oksana Sakharevich
- Tetyana Kozyreva
- Roksolana Zavinskaya
- Olga Movchan
- Andriy Ishchyk
- Iryna Sheremeta
- Marichka Karpa
- Myroslav Otkovych
- Olexandr Radchenko
- Dmytro and Vitaliy Kapranovs
- Vitaly Krutyakov
- Natalia Struk
- Evgeny Senin
- Danylo Yanevsky
- Vitaly Pivovar
- Danylo Mokryk
- Dmytro Tuzov
- Viktor Bishchuk
- Volodymyr Boyko
- Solomia Buy
- Andriy Stelmakh
- Inna Moskvina
- Olga Butko
- Natalia Vlashchenko
- Tetyana Danilenko
- Leyla Mamedova
- Yuriy Kulinich
- Ksenia Smirnova
- Anna Nytchenko
- Yulia Voinar
- Ivan Dovgalyuk
- Roksana Runo
- Pavlo Kruglyakovskyi
- Natalka Lyaturynska
- Bogdan Mashay
- Anna Zakutskaya
- Anastasia Gusareva
- Alexei Burlakov
- Andriana Kucher
- Alexei Shevchuk
- Alexei Kucherenko
- Viktoria Popovych
- Denys Zepsen
- Evgenia Taganovich
- Tetyana Goncharova
- Vadym Plachynda
- Vladimir Andrievskyi
- Vasyl Apasov
- Olga Volkova
- Vadym Gerasimovich
- Anastasia Daynod
- Nazar Dovgyi
- Nadiya Koptelova
- Nina Krokhmalyuk
- Stanislav Listopad
- Yulia Litvinenko
- Roman Malik
- Anna Mozharovskaya
- Olga Nemtseva
- Katerina Romanyuk
- Nadiya Sass
- Anastasia Stetsenko
- Volodymyr Khomyak
- Arthur Shurypa
- Tamara Mishina
- Rostislav Sukhachev
- Tetyana Terekhova
- Maxim Zborovsky

== Closed programs ==
- Who Lives Here? (2010–2012) is a journalistic investigative program that showed the luxurious life of officials, high-ranking officials, and regional leaders. Each episode of the program was dedicated to a separate figure. Journalists prepared a series of investigative stories about his fortune. To comment on the collected materials, explain the source of his income and the opportunity to lead a luxurious life on the salary of a civil servant, the figure under investigation was invited to the “red sofa” on the live broadcast of the program. Over the two and a half years of its existence, the program prepared almost 150 episodes. As a result of journalistic investigations, numerous criminal cases were initiated against the figures of the program, and several officials lost their positions.
- People's Control (2013–2014) is a journalistic investigative program. The program's slogan is Article 5 of the Constitution of Ukraine: “The only source of power in Ukraine is the people.”
- Lustration (2012-2014) is a political special project, where the program’s characters undergo journalistic control for political honesty. Initially, the program was broadcast as a political special project. In March 2014, the channel provided airtime in the evening prime time to the Lustration Committee of the Maidan of Lviv Region to conduct an open public lustration. Officials and candidates for leadership positions in the Lviv Region — from the head of the Regional State Administration to representatives of the security bloc — underwent the lustration process live on air, with the participation of experts, public figures, journalists, and the public. In particular, it was after the lustration on the live air of ZIKy that Dmytro Zagaria was appointed head of the Main Directorate of the Ministry of Internal Affairs in the Lviv region. The participants and moderators of the live air of “Lustration” were determined by the editorial board of the Lustration Committee of the Maidan of Lviv Region.
- PROVOcation (2010–2013) is a program aimed at protecting people's right to a decent life.
- Show them! Lviv-Donbas Show (2013) is a reality show created in cooperation with TRK Donbas. The project is based on ten stories of the collision and comparison of two cultures, two mentalities, two ways of life. This is Galicia - through the eyes of Donetsk people, and Donbas - through the eyes of Lviv people. Representatives of different professions went on a "business trip" from Donetsk to Lviv for several days and vice versa to immerse themselves in life in a new atmosphere.
- Live (2010–2012) is a program about people's reactions, behavior, thoughts, and emotions.
- ON! WORK (2012–2013) is a social show, the main prize is a dream job for the finalist.
- Our Money (2013-2016) is an anti-corruption project that has been on the air since November 2013 in cooperation with the online resource "Our Money". The main topic of the project's investigations is the illegal use of budget funds through tenders and public procurement. The head and host is Denys Bigus.
- Hearing Ukraine (2016-2017) is an informational and analytical talk show on the air with inclusions from the regions.
- In the eyes - a frank live dialogue with a studio guest - the main newsmaker of the past week.
- HousingBlud - a raid on illegal developments in the capital and major cities of Ukraine. The team finds out everything you need to know so as not to become a victim of illegal developers or an accomplice in construction scams.
- Medical Secrets - an exposé project about the domestic medical industry.
- Last resort (2017) — social investigations of a nationwide scale, the hero of which is a small person who presents a big problem.
- Jokers (2018–2019) — a joint exposé project with the online publication "Ukrainian Pravda" with the host, well-known journalist Sevgil Musaeva, about the financing of political parties in Ukraine
- Classics Game (2013–2019) — a political show where the present is presented through historical analogies and parallels. Author and host — Serhiy Rakhmanin.
- Historical Truth with Vakhtang Kipiani (2013–2019) — a historical television magazine,[44] published in collaboration with the online version of "Historical Truth" (Ukrainian Pravda). Author and host — Vakhtang Kipiani.
- Survive in Ukraine (2018) is a unique eco-project, the main theme of which is the survival of one person and the entire country in the face of environmental problems. Famous people help journalists of the ZIK TV channel to show the true state of the domestic environmental situation. Garage (2018) is an entertainment and music program in the format of a casual interview, during which the host talks with guests about their creativity, first steps in music, achievements and difficulties.

== Broadcasting ==
=== Satellite ===
Satellite
Astra 4A
FEC
EPG
FTA

=== LIVE ===
4
MX-3
DVB-T2
✗
SD 576i 16:9
