= Yevhen Murayev =

Ukrainian politician and media owner (born 1976)

Yevheniy Murayev
- Євгеній Мураєв
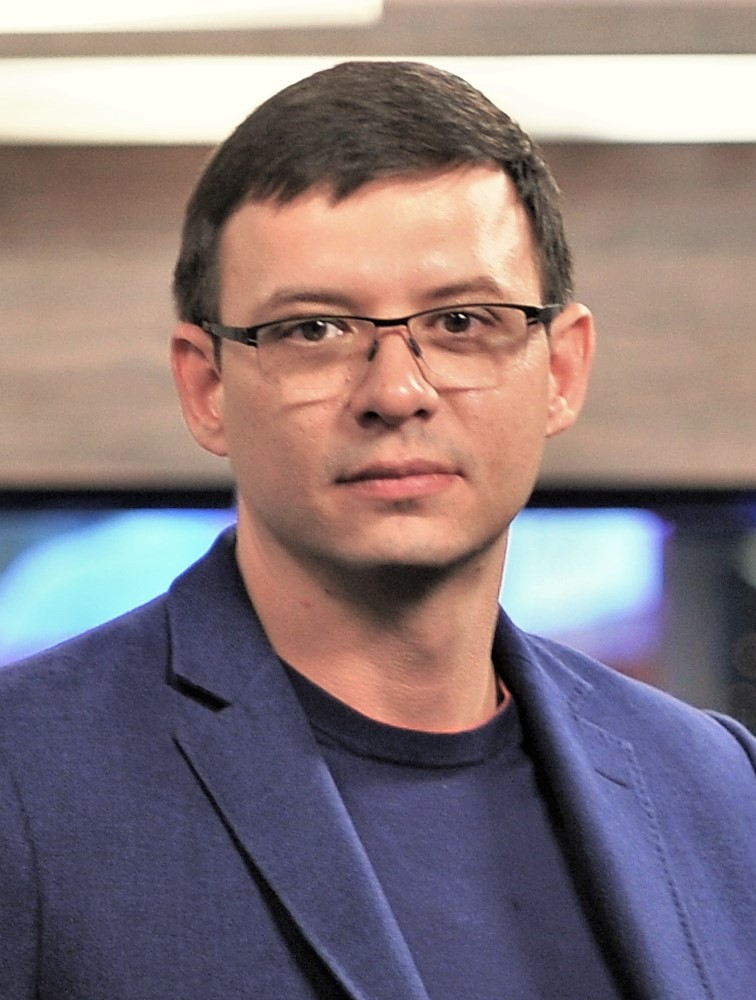
- Murayev in 2015

People's Deputy of Ukraine

8th convocation
- In office 27 November 2014 – 29 August 2019
- Constituency: Kharkiv Oblast, No. 181

7th convocation
- In office 12 December 2012 – 27 November 2014
- Constituency: Kharkiv Oblast, No. 181

Head of Zmiiv Raion
- In office 2010–2012

Personal details
- Born: Yevheniy Volodymyrovych Murayev; 2 December 1976 (age 49) Zmiiv, Kharkiv Oblast, Ukrainian SSR, Soviet Union
- Citizenship: Ukraine
- Party: Nashi; Opposition Bloc (2019)
- Children: 4
- Occupation: Media proprietor
- Known for: TV channels NewsOne and NASH

Yevheniy Volodymyrovych Murayev (Ukrainian: Євгеній Володимирович Мураєв; born 2 December 1976) is a Ukrainian politician and media owner. He was the leader of the now-banned political party Nashi.

Murayev has been a deputy of the Kharkiv Oblast Council (two convocations) and a deputy of the Ukrainian parliament between 2012 and 2019 (VII convocation and VIII convocation). In the 2019 Ukrainian parliamentary election Murayev headed the nationwide list of Opposition Bloc, but this party failed to win a parliamentary seat.

Murayev is a former member of Party of Regions and Opposition Bloc and former chairman of the political council of the For Life (Za zhyttia) party.

Following the 2022 Russian invasion of Ukraine, Murayev disappeared and was rumoured to be in Russia, while other sources claimed he lived in Austria. The British government alleged prior to the invasion that Murayev was selected by the Kremlin to be the next president of Ukraine under a new government. In January 2025 Murayev revealed that he lived in China.

== Biography ==
=== Early life and professional career ===
Murayev was born on 2 December 1976 in Zmiiv, Kharkiv Oblast in then the Ukrainian SSR of the Soviet Union. Murayev's father Volodymyr Kuzmych was the general director of a construction company Rapid CJSC. His mother Olha Oleksiivna was associate professor of the department of chemistry at National University of Kharkiv.

In 1994 Murayev entered the Faculty of Economics of Kharkiv State University, from which he graduated in 1999. He completed with distinction. He received his second higher education at the Yaroslav Mudryi National Law University, he graduated there in 2014.

From 2000 Murayev worked in several companies in senior positions. He held the position of director of LLC "Anklav" (wholesale trade in petroleum products). From 2001 to 2007 he was director of MKM-Khirkov LLC and from 2009 to 2010 (he was director) of Eastern Financial Group LLC.

=== Political and media career ===
In the 2006 Ukrainian local elections Murayev was elected for the party Viche in the Kharkiv Oblast Council. In the same election he failed to get elected to the Kharkiv City Council for the same party.

In the 2007 Ukrainian parliamentary election Murayev failed to win a seat as part of the electoral alliance KUCHMA. At that elections this bloc failed to enter parliament winning only 0,10% of the national vote.

Murayev was reelected in the Kharkiv Oblast Council during the 2010 Ukrainian local elections, this time for Party of Regions.

In 2010, Murayev was appointed head of Zmiiv Raion by President Viktor Yanukovich.

In the 2012 Ukrainian parliamentary election he was elected in electoral district 181 located in Zmiiv. He, as a candidate of Party of Regions, won the district with 56.15% of the votes. He was Chairman of the Subcommittee on Foreign Economic Relations and Cross-Border Cooperation. Following his election he resigned as head of Zmiiv Raion.

In July 2019, Murayev told Dmitry Gordon that in February 2014 he had taken the fleeing former Prime Minister of Ukraine Mykola Azarov out of Ukraine from Kharkiv to Belgorod during the final days of Euromaidan.

In the 2014 Ukrainian parliamentary election Murayev was reelected as an independent candidate in (the same) district 181. In 2014 he won reelection with 48.95%. From 2015 to 2016 he was a member of the Opposition Bloc faction. In the Verkhovna Rada, he was a member of the Parliamentary Committee on Tax and Customs Policy.

In 2018 Murayev became chairman of the political council of the For Life (Za zhyttia) party. In September 2018, he left Za zhyttia and (five days later) created the new political party Nashi (Ours).

On 10 January 2019, Murayev's party elected him as their candidate in the 2019 Ukrainian presidential election. On 7 March 2019, Murayev pulled out of the election in favor of Oleksandr Vilkul. He also announced that Vilkul's party Opposition Bloc and Nashi would soon merge. In the 2019 Ukrainian parliamentary election Murayev headed the nationwide list of Opposition Bloc that won 3.23% of the votes and thus did not overcome the 5% election barrier, thereby keeping Murayev out of parliament.

In 2014, Murayev became the owner of the Kharkiv Internet channel "Robinson TV", the MIGnews website and the news channel NewsOne. He is the founder of the pro-Russian TV channel NASH, which was owned by his father Volodymyr Murayev, and on 7 November 2018, NASH announced it would begin airing in the fall under the leadership of the former owner of NewsOne. TV channel NewsOne was banned by a decree of President Volodymyr Zelenskyy in February 2021. Then, NASH took the place of the banned pro-Russian TV channels as it mostly features the same guests and similar messages, until the channel was also banned in June 2023.

In January 2022, the British government accused Russia of seeking to supplant Ukraine's government via military force, and replace it with a pro-Russian administration possibly led by Murayev. British Foreign Minister Liz Truss wrote on Twitter that the UK "will not tolerate Kremlin plot to install pro-Russian leadership in Ukraine." Murayev denied any such plan. Yevhen Murayev rejected the statement since he is under Russian sanctions. Russia dismissed the accusation as "misinformation". The Russian Foreign Ministry said the British accusation was "evidence that it is the NATO countries, led by the Anglo-Saxons, that are escalating tensions around Ukraine." Volodymyr Fesenko, a Ukrainian political analyst, wrote that "Murayev, for all his pro-Russianness, is not a figure who is very close to the Kremlin, especially compared to (Viktor) Medvedchuk." (Note: In January 2022, the United States intelligence community named Viktor Medvedchuk as a possible Kremlin-supported choice to lead a pro-Russia puppet Ukrainian government and, in February 2022, the United States intelligence community named Oleg Tsaryov as another possible Kremlin-supported choice to lead a pro-Russia puppet Ukrainian government.)

In February 2022, it was announced that the National Security and Defense Council of Ukraine had introduced sanctions against the TV channel NASH, on which Murayev appeared regularly. The channel was going to be closed. It was officially banned from broadcasting on 8 June 2023.

On 24 February 2022, Russian President Vladimir Putin announced that Russia was conducting a "special military operation in Donbas"; soon after Russia started a massive invasion of Ukraine. On 24 February Murayev posted on Facebook “All these years, our government has lived by war, built all its policies around it, and now war is on the doorstep of each of us. These are the consequences of wrong and stupid decisions that everyone will have to unravel." He did not mention Russia in this post. Murayev latest Facebook post was on 25 February 2022. His whereabouts (and opinions) then became unknown. Ukrainian Internet publication Obozrevatel claimed early April 2022 that Murayev had gone to Russia with the help of Russian special services. Obozrevatel went on to claim that Russian authorities had considered Murayev as a possible "Gauleiter" of Kharkiv if the Russians had managed to occupy the city or as a new "president of Ukraine" if Kyiv had been captured. Internet newspaper Ukrainska Pravda's sources (in law enforcement agencies) told them (in December 2022) that Murayev had left Ukraine in May 2022. In September 2022, Ukrainska Pravda journalists stated that Murayev and his family live in Vienna and sometimes visit Bratislava on business.

On 14 June 2022 the Eighth Administrative Court of Appeal banned Murayev's party Nashi. The property of the party and all its branches were transferred to the state.

In January 2025 Murayev gave an interview revealing that he and his family lived in Beijing, China. In the interview Murayev claimed that President Zelenskyy "is not going to end the war under any circumstances." and called Russia a country which "we have a centuries-old history within a single state". He called the ongoing Russian invasion of Ukraine "bad relations between the countries" and went on to claim that Ukrainians and Russians are "not foreign people." Murayev also complained about alleged "Ukrainian non-compliance with the Minsk agreements."

Murayev's assets were blocked and he was stripped of his Ukrainian state awards on 19 January 2025 by a decree of Ukrainian president Volodymyr Zelenskyy.

== Views ==
Murayev considered the February 2014 Maidan revolution a Western-backed coup d’etat. He claimed that the annexation of Crimea by the Russian Federation is recognized by the world and that the annexation is favorable to the government of Ukraine.

With the beginning of the Russo-Ukrainian War, Murayev said that it was a "civil conflict", noting that both sides received support from foreign states: Ukraine from the United States, and the separatists from Russia. Murayev speculated, falsely, that US private military companies such as Greystone and Blackwater took part in the battle of Mariupol.

Murayev believes that "NATO does not wait for Ukraine." He believes that the issue of Ukrainian NATO membership should be decided at a referendum.

Murayev is a supporter of decentralisation in Ukraine and expansion of the powers of the regions.

Murayev opposes decommunization and has advocated for the preservation (in Ukraine) of the symbols of the Soviet Union as "historical and cultural memory".

In an interview with the 112 Ukraine TV channel on 7 June 2018 Murayev described the, at the time imprisoned in Russia, Ukrainian film director Oleh Sentsov as a "person who was plotting arsons and explosions" and thus Sentsov was "a terrorist for one part of the population." In response to this in June 2018 the Prosecutor General's Office of Ukraine launched criminal proceedings against then MP Murayev on charges of treason and deliberately spreading false information about a crime. On 13 June 2018 Murayev published a video in which he apologizes to Sentsov. He said he did not know whether the accusations of terrorism against Sentsov were fair, he also stated that he had not express his personal attitude Sentsov. Murayev claimed he had made his remarks "to show how the government works." And used what he called the example of Nadiya Savchenko "when they did their best to create an idol and a new hero of Ukraine, which was used for political confrontation with the northern neighbor and as an instrument of pressure on the world community."

== Personal life ==
Murayev is divorced (since 2017). He has three sons and one daughter.
