= Dmytro Chobit =

Ukrainian historian and politician

- Дмитро Чобіт
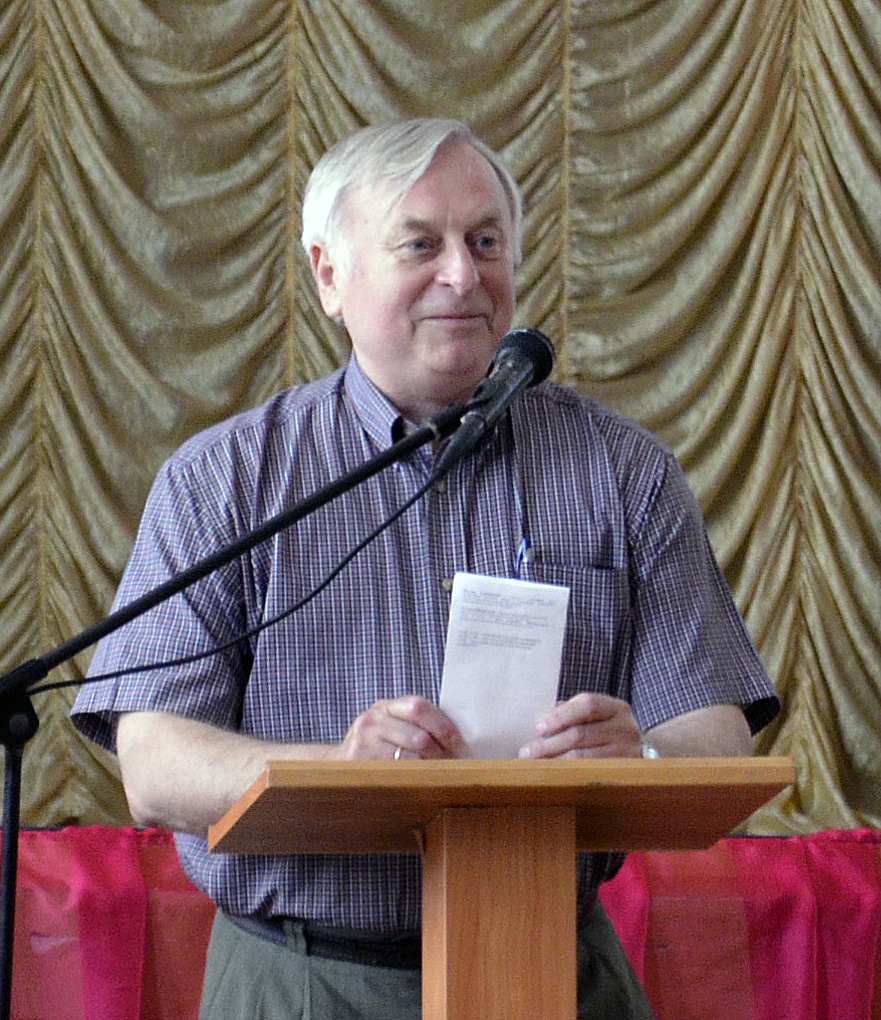
- Chobit in 2014

People's Deputy of Ukraine
- In office 15 May 1990 – 14 May 2002
- Preceded by: Position established (1990); Yevhen Hryniv (1994)
- Succeeded by: Ihor Ostash (1994); Constituency abolished (1998)
- Constituency: Lviv Oblast, No. 269 (1990–1994); Lviv Oblast, No. 271 (1994–1998); People's Movement of Ukraine, No. 40 (1998–2002)

Personal details
- Born: 19 February 1952 (age 74) Brody, Ukrainian SSR, Soviet Union (now Ukraine)
- Party: People's Movement of Ukraine
- Education: Taras Shevchenko National University of Kyiv

Dmytro Vasylovych Chobit (Ukrainian: Дмитро Васильович Чобіт; born 19 February 1952) is a Ukrainian historian, publicist (opinion journalism), and politician.

Chobit specializes in local studies and is a member of the National Union of Local Historians of Ukraine, the Shevchenko Society of Ukrainian Language, and the National Writer's Union of Ukraine. Chobit became known for his scandal with Viktor Medvedchuk in 2003, when Medvedchuk filed a court case against him for the Chobit's book "Narcissus" (Нарцис).

== Bibliography ==
- Brody – overview of local history, 1984
- In the parliament of new Ukraine, 1995
- Pidhirtsi. Historical and architectural pearl of Ukraine, 1998
- Whistler, 1999
- Battle near Berestechko
- Time of disgraceful authority or whether the Gongadze case is the case of Kuchma? (2001)
- Narcissus. Features of the Viktor Medvedchuk's political portrait, (2002)
