= Russian occupation of Ukraine (disambiguation) =

Russian occupation of Ukraine refers to territories of Ukraine that Russia is currently occupying.

Russian occupation of Ukraine may also refer to:

- Ukrainian War of Independence (1917–1921)
- 1918 Soviet invasion of Ukraine
- 1919 Soviet invasion of Ukraine
- Kharkiv Operation (December 1919)
- Russian occupation of Crimea (February 2014–present)
- Russian occupation of Dnipropetrovsk Oblast (February–May 2022)
- Russian occupation of Poltava Oblast (February–May 2022)
- Donetsk People's Republic (2014–present)
- Russian occupation of Kharkiv Oblast (February 2022–present)
- Russian occupation of Kherson Oblast (March 2022–present)
- Luhansk People's Republic (2014–present)
- Russian occupation of Mykolaiv Oblast (February–November 2022)
- Russian occupation of Sumy Oblast (February–April 2022)
- Russian occupation of Zaporizhzhia Oblast (February 2022–present)

== See also ==
- Soviet occupation of Ukraine (disambiguation)
