= Pochet =

Pochet Почет
- Settlement
- Location within Krasnoyarsk Krai Location within Russia
- Coordinates: 57°11′31″N 96°25′15″E
- Country: Russia
- Region: Krasnoyarsk Krai
- District: Abansky District
- Time zone: UTC+3:00

Pochet (Russian: По́чет) is a rural locality (a settlement) in Pochetsky Selsoviet of Abansky District, located in Krasnoyarsk Krai, Russia. Population: 947 (2010 census); 1,044 (2002 census);

== Notable people ==
- Viktor Medvedchuk (born 1954), politician
