= NewsOne (Ukrainian TV channel) =

Ukrainian pro-Russian TV channel

- Country: Ukraine

Programming
- Picture format: 576i 16:9 (SDTV) 1080i (HDTV)

Ownership
- Owner: Taras Kozak, formerly Yevhen Murayev

History
- Launched: 17 December 2005
- Closed: 26 February 2021

Links
- Website: newsone.ua

NewsOne was a pro-Russian information and educational TV channel in Ukraine. It was a member of the Novyny media holding group unofficially owned by politician Viktor Medvedchuk through his associate Taras Kozak.

NewsOne aired from 2005 to 2021. Due to the anti-Ukrainian activities of its owners (Medvedchuk and Kozak), the signals of the TV channels of the media holding were blocked on 2 February 2021 by decree of President Volodymyr Zelenskyy and the decision of the National Security and Defense Council. On 26 February 2021, from the closed channels of the media holding—NewsOne, ZIK and 112 Ukraine—a new TV channel was created - "First Independent", where the journalists of the closed TV channels moved.

The TV channel had a clear anti-Ukrainian and pro-Russian bias and was considered one of the leading pro-Russian and anti-Ukrainian TV channels in Ukraine at the time.

== History ==
On 17 January 2014, Yevhen Muraev, a deputy from the Party of Regions, bought the TV channel from Vadym Rabinovych. In May of the same year, the channel was headed by Igor Zolotarevsky, former director of Ukraine's broadcasting department, and his former deputy, Daryna Ogir (according to official documents, Anton Averyanov was the director and Daryna Ogir was a member of the channel's editorial board).

On 10 November 2014, the TV channel started broadcasting in 16:9 format.

On 2 March 2015, media manager Oleksiy Semenov became general producer of the channel.

On 24 August 2015, the TV channel changed its logo, design, graphics and studio.

At the end of 2015 and the beginning of 2016, the channel was the third most popular information channel in Ukraine. In 2016, the channel was included in the main cable networks of Ukraine and was broadcast in analog and digital in HD and SD formats. It was included in the terrestrial digital DVB-T package in the Kyiv region.

Satellite broadcasting was carried out through the Astra 4A satellite to Ukraine, Europe and the western regions of European Russia.

== Owners ==
Until August 2010, the channel belonged to Rudolf Kirnos, owner of RU Music;

- August 2010 - 50% of the channel's shares passed to Vadym Rabinovych's Media International Group (MIG);
- 12 May 2011 - from Reality TV LLC, Vadym Rabinovych personally became the owner of the other 50% of the channel's shares;
- January 2012 - both stakes were consolidated in Rabinovych's direct ownership;
- January 2014 - 31 August 2018 - a member of the party "OURS", previously "For Life", "Opposition Bloc" and "Party of Regions", People's Deputy Eugene Muraev
- 31 August – 5 October 2018 - Andriy Portnov, former Deputy Head of the administration of Viktor Yanukovych (2010-2014), People's Deputy of the sixth session of the Verkhovna Rada from the Batkivshchyna party and lawyer
- 5 October 2018 - Taras Kozak, People's Deputy in the eighth and ninth sessions of the Verkhovna Rada from the Opposition Bloc and the Opposition Platform - For Life parties, close to Viktor Medvedchuk

== Scandals and illegal activities ==
Since 14 June 2019, the TV channel has been part of the Noviny media holding owned by Taras Kozak, an ally of Ukrainian pro-Russian politician and personal friend of Vladimir Putin, Viktor Medvedchuk, which also includes ZIK and 112 Ukraine.

The channel promoted political forces close to its owner and his anti-Ukrainian position.

On 29 November 2017, during the political show "Ukrainian Format", the then-owner of the TV channel Yevgeny Muraev defended Russian propaganda stamps about the Maidan and called the Revolution of Dignity a "coup d'etat", which drew criticism from several MPs on the show and social media users. 14] . In her article in the online publication Media Detector, media critic Inna Dolzhenkova accused Muraev of treason.

In early December 2017, the entrance to the NewsOne building was blocked by unknown individuals in military uniform. According to then-owner Yevhen Muraev, Dmytro Korchynskyi, leader of the Bratstvo party, was responsible.
