= Soviet occupation of Ukraine =

Soviet occupation of Ukraine may refer to:

- Ukrainian War of Independence (1917–1921)
  - 1918 Soviet invasion of Ukraine
  - 1919 Soviet invasion of Ukraine
  - Kharkiv Operation (December 1919)
- Soviet annexation of Eastern Galicia and Volhynia (1939)
- Soviet occupation of Bessarabia and Northern Bukovina (1940)
- Soviet annexation of Transcarpathia (1944–45)

== See also ==
- Russian occupation of Ukraine (disambiguation)
