= Ukrainian Choice =

Pro-Russian political organisation in Ukraine

Ukrainian Choice – Right of the People Украинский выбор — право народа Український вибір — право народу
- Leader: Viktor Medvedchuk
- Founder: Viktor Medvedchuk
- Founded: 4 April 2012
- Dissolved: 8 March 2022 (de facto)
- Split from: Social Democratic Party of Ukraine (united)
- Headquarters: Vasylkivska 23-B, Kyiv
- Ideology: Conservatism; Federalism; Euroscepticism; Russophilia
- Political position: Right-wing
- National affiliation: Opposition Platform — For Life (2018–22)
- Colours: Light blue Purple; Magenta

Website
- vybor.ua

Ukrainian Choice, officially since 2016 named Ukrainian Choice – Right of the People (Ukrainian: Український вибір — Право народу; Russian: Украинский выбор — право народа), is an NGO in Ukraine. It was initiated by and is led by the business tycoon Viktor Medvedchuk. In Ukraine it is considered a pro-Russian organisation.

After the beginning of the 2022 Russian invasion of Ukraine some of the organisation leaders were detained by the SBU on charges of preparing a coup d'état and collaborating with Russian special services. Medvedchuk himself is living in exile in Russia since September 2022 after being handed over to Russia in a prisoner exchange.

== Ideology ==
The organization was founded in April 2012. It opposes Ukraine–European Union relations and NATO membership of Ukraine and would prefer Ukraine to join the Eurasian Economic Union instead. The group also wants "decentralization of power followed by the transition to a federal structure, while maintaining the territorial integrity and unity of Ukraine". The organization argued that the European Union seeks to colonize Ukrainian economy, writing: "So far, the economy of the European Union can only be saved by economic expansion to the East. And Ukraine is one of the tasty “dishes” in the eastern economic “menu”."

Ukrainian Choice also emphasizes Slavic Orthodox values: in July 2013, it organized a conference on the topic "Orthodox-Slavic values – the basics of the civilizational choice of Ukraine", where Vladimir Putin held a speech. (Putin is the godfather of Medvedchuk's 2004 born daughter Darina). The party promotes religious conservatism such as traditional values on sexual issues, and warns that integration with the West and the European Union would compromise Christianity in Ukraine.

A religious issue that Ukrainian Choice campaigned most actively on was opposition to LGBT; Medvedchuk argued: "The protection of sexual minorities implies monitoring of the situation in the ‘warded’ country, so that they are not infringed in promotion, including in government and business. On the contrary, with the advent of such powerful patronage, a career springboard, more people will enroll in the ranks of gays and lesbians for sure. It is somehow similar to indicative planning, taxation privileges on the development of a certain kind of activity. And, naturally, the growing LGBT community will become loyal supporters of [their] patrons, a new cohort to promote their interests. Any objective resistance to the propaganda and career promotion of homosexuals will be exhibited as a violation of the rights of the ward, requiring the intervention of foreign patrons.”

The organization stated that direct democracy and federalization of Ukraine were its main aims. It had a network of about 300 groups composed of religious organizations associated with the Russian Orthodox Church and Cossack Units. Ukrainian Choice also promoted Rusyn minority interests. The NGO strongly campaigned against the Ukrainian membership in the EU, warning of risks like job losses, living cost increase, and enforcing socially liberal reforms in Ukraine at expense of the religious and traditionalist communities in Ukraine. The organization also called for a separate, equal status of the Russian language in Ukraine.

== Activities ==
According to The New York Times the group aimed at stopping former president Viktor Yanukovych from signing Ukraine's Association Agreement with the European Union. In a leaked June 2013 Russian-ordered consultation document, whose contents have been corroborated by a former security source in Ukraine, the Russian government wanted Ukrainian Choice to influence public opinion. At the time Medvedchuk and the organization had marginal popular support in Ukraine.

In the fall of 2013, Ukrainian Choice ran an aggressive anti-gay ad campaign warning against "decayed values" in the Western world. Some of the ads claimed that association with the European Union would mean the legalization of same-sex marriage. At the time, Medvedchuk described the European Union as the "modern heir to the Third Reich." Another slogan of the organisation at the time was "the European path of development – is the path to the destruction of Ukraine's independence.

During annexation of Crimea by the Russian Federation in March 2014, the organization organized blockage of Ukrainian military logistics.

== De-facto end of the organisation ==
After the beginning of the 2022 Russian invasion of Ukraine some Ukrainian Choice leaders were detained by the SBU on charges of preparing a coup d'état and collaborating with Russian special services.

Ukrainian Choice leader Viktor Medvedchuk himself is living in exile in Russia since September 2022 after being handed over to Russia in a prisoner exchange.

In October 2022 the Kyiv District Administrative Court opened proceedings on a lawsuit by the Ministry of Justice banning, but a date of consideration of this case was not set.

A former coordinator of the organisation in Mykolaiv Oblast was employed by Russian occupation officials and became a spokesperson of the South Ukraine Nuclear Power Plant in September 2023.

In April 2023 Medvedchuk created the "Second Ukraine" movement that operates from Russia.

== Criticism ==
Former president of Ukraine Leonid Kravchuk stated in 2012 that "The Ukrainian Choice is not a Ukrainian choice, but a choice of Russia in Ukraine".

Dmitry Alekseev, a Russian political technologist and director general of Russia's National Political Agency, said in December 2013 that Russia was trying to "forge" pro-Russian politicians in Ukraine, so it was funding Viktor Medvedchuk's Ukrainian Choice project, as previously funded by Natalia Vitrenko's Progressive Socialist Party of Ukraine.

On February 26, 2014, deputies of the Zakarpattia Oblast Council banned the activities of Viktor Medvedchuk's "Ukrainian Choice" in the region.

"Ukrainian Choice" is also accused of anti-Semitism for articles on the organization's website, which accuses Jews of allegedly owning all power in Ukraine.

In March 2021 the Security Service of Ukraine (SBU) searched "Ukrainian Choice" offices across Ukraine as part of their investigation theses that the organisation helped to organize the Crimean referendum during the 2014 Russian annexation of Crimea. The SBU also claimed that the organisation continued to coordinate the activities of its members in the Autonomous Republic of Crimea "despite attempts to publicly distance themselves from the illegal actions of their colleagues on the peninsula." "Ukrainian Choice" officially liquidated its Crimean branch in 2017.
