= LB.ua =

Ukrainian newspaper

Left Bank
- Website type: Broadsheet (to 2011); Online newspaper (from 2009)
- Available in: Ukrainian; English
- Headquarters: Kyiv, Ukraine
- Owner: Gorshenin Institute
- Website: lb.ua
- Commercial: Yes
- Registration: Not required
- Launched: June 2009; 17 years ago

Left Bank (Ukrainian: Лівий берег, romanized: Livyi bereh) is a Ukrainian online newspaper and former print publication first published in April 2008 as a Russian-language socio-political weekly. Its founder and owner is the Gorshenin Institute, a research and analytics company. Since January 2011, the newspaper is no longer printed and is solely an online publication. The online version of the newspaper, which is still active, was established in June 2009. From June 2009 to July 2020, the Gorshenin Institute also had a Russian-language version of the site. In May 2012, a Ukrainian-language version of the site appeared at ukr.lb.ua, although this was closed six months later in November 2012. The Ukrainian-language version was relaunched in February 2014 at the old address ukr.lb.ua and in July 2020, the Ukrainian-language version of the site moved to lb.ua, which was the Russian-language version of the site until July 2020.

The print newspaper, which had the same name, was first published in April 2008 in Dnipro as a Russian-language socio-political weekly and distributed throughout the country. The newspaper reached a circulation of 90,000 copies and was distributed in cities including Kyiv, Dnipro, Kharkiv and Odesa. In 2009, the total circulation of the newspaper was 300,000 copies. In January 2011, the print newspaper was closed due to the termination of funding, with the editors deciding to continue their work in the newspaper's current online version LB.ua. In May 2014, a comeback of a printed version to be circulated in Dnipro was announced by the makers of the online version of the publication.

== See also ==
- List of newspapers in Ukraine
