= 112 Ukraine =

Ukrainian TV channel

- 112 Ukraine logo prior to closure of television broadcasts
- Country: Ukraine

Programming
- Languages: Ukrainian, Russian
- Picture format: 1080i (HDTV) (downscaled to letterboxed 576i for SDTV)

Ownership
- Owner: Taras Kozak

History
- Launched: 26 November 2013
- Closed: 26 February 2021

Links
- Website: 112.ua 112ua.tv 112.international

112 Ukraine (Ukrainian: 112 Україна) was a private Ukrainian TV channel which provided 24-hour news coverage. 112 Ukraine was available on satellites AMOS 2/3, via the DVB-T2 network, and was also available in packages of all major Ukrainian cable operators until it was banned from broadcasting in Ukraine in February 2021. The channel was focused on live broadcasting.

It was reportedly affiliated with the pro-Russian politician and businessman Viktor Medvedchuk. Since December 2018, the channel has been owned by Taras Kozak, a parliament member of Opposition Platform — For Life who is reportedly an associate of Medvedchuk. The broadcasting of the channel was prohibited on 2 February 2021 by the National Security and Defense Council of Ukraine as part of the imposed sanctions on Kozak. The channel was immediately shut down but continued to livestream its content on the Internet. On 5 March 2021, YouTube blocked the live broadcasts of the channel.

== History of the channel ==
112 Ukraine was launched within 4 months of its conception, starting from concept development, equipment supply and office space design up to programming and business optimization solutions. On 26 November 2013, the presentation of 112 Ukraine took place, and on 28 November 2013, the new TV channel appeared on Ukrainian screens. In August 2014, the channel opened a correspondence bureau in Brussels. It later organized live linkups with Crimea, Moscow, Vilnius and Lviv.

During the first informal July 2014 meeting with 112 Ukraine representatives, Head and Deputies of the National Television and Radio Broadcasting Council claimed that "112 Ukraine" owner Andrey Podschypkov is a nominal owner, despite documentary proofs. National Council representatives stated that the real owner is one of the former Ministers of the Viktor Yanukovych cabinet, and refused to renew the programming concept of five regional stations owned by 112 Ukraine. In 2015, 112 Ukraine received a notice from the National Council for remarks by Russian journalist Maksim Shevchenko, who was interviewed in the studio via Skype during a "Shuster LIVE" talk-show. The president of the European Federation of Journalists stated in February 2015 that the threat of closure targeting 112 Ukraine seemed clearly disproportionate.

In December 2018, member of parliament for Opposition Bloc Taras Kozak, who was later reelected for Opposition Platform — For Life in 2019, acquired the channel and all six TV channels in the "112 Ukraine" group.

On 13 July 2019, an unidentified assailant fired a grenade at the 112 Ukraine offices in Kyiv, causing damage to the building.

In late May 2020, 112 Ukraine received a fine of ₴100,000 for broadcasting Petro Symonenko's claim that the war in Donbas was a "civil war" initiated by "Ukrainian nationalists and neo-fascists supported by the United States". Symonenko is the First Secretary of the Communist Party of Ukraine (KPU), a party that was banned in 2015.

On 30 January 2026, the National Security and Defense Council announced the imposition of sanctions on the 112 Ukraine indefinitely.

=== Acquisition attempts ===
In 2016, a Ukrainian member of the parliament, Oleksandr Onyshchenko, claimed that Ukrainian President Petro Poroshenko asked him to buy the 112 Ukraine channel. Later that year, it was published that Ukrainian firm Investment Capital Ukraine (ICU), and its founder Makar Paseniuk, were in charge of orchestrating the deal.

According to media reports, ICU utilized an offshore entity named Maresko Holdings Limited in the British Virgin Islands, in an attempt to purchase the channel's shares. The deal was later canceled due to failed negotiations, and Maresko Holdings was renamed to ICU International Ltd.

=== Closure ===
On 2 February 2021, the National Security and Defense Council of Ukraine officially prohibited the channel's broadcasts as part of imposed sanctions on 112 Ukraine owner Taras Kozak. The reason given for the sanctions against him was that according to the Security Service of Ukraine investigation, Kozak controlled coal mines supply scheme from parts of the Donetsk and Luhansk regions not under government control, contributing to the financing of "terrorism". As part of these sanctions, the channel was forbidden to broadcast in Ukraine. The channel was immediately shut down, although later it moved to Internet livestreaming. Ukrainian President Volodymyr Zelenskyy stated that the ban had been a difficult decision and that Ukraine supported freedom of speech, but not "propaganda financed by the aggressor country." Adviser of the Office of the President of Ukraine Mykhailo Podolyak stated on Ukrainian media that the channel, as well as fellow banned TV channels owned by Kozak (NewsOne and ZIK (Ukraine)), were "quite actively and often openly used as tools of foreign propaganda in Ukraine." In a joint statement with NewsOne and ZiK, 112 Ukraine commented on its ban, calling it "a political reprisal against objectionable media." Russian Senator for United Russia Aleksey Pushkov claimed that "By shutting down opposition television channels, Zelensky acknowledged his inability to withstand political competition." In a written statement, a spokesperson for the European Union's Foreign Affairs High Representative Josep Borrell stated "while Ukraine's efforts to protect its territorial integrity and national security, as well as to defend itself from information manipulation are legitimate", it added that "any measures taken should be proportional to the aim". The U.S. Embassy in Ukraine said on 3 February that "the United States supports Ukraine's efforts yesterday to counter Russia's malign influence, in line with Ukrainian law, in defense of its sovereignty and territorial integrity." Following the ban on their channels, journalists from 112 Ukraine, NewsOne and ZIK established another TV channel, entitled "The First Independent TV Channel" (Ukrainian: "Першого незалежного"), which was shut down an hour after it launched.

On 5 March 2021, YouTube blocked 112 Ukraine's live broadcasts, although it did not take any action against "The First Independent TV Channel".

== Structure and coverage ==
Prior to its February 2021 ban, 112 Ukraine covered 75% of the territory of Ukraine. The channel was available in the packages of the largest Ukrainian cable operators, and is also broadcast via the DVB-T2 network and AMOS 2/3 satellites.

112 Ukraine operated on one satellite license and five regional digital licenses, which were united by a joint venture agreement. The satellite license for 112 Ukraine was issued on 22 August 2013. The companies with digital licenses were merged with the companies of 112 Ukraine on 16 August 2014.

A study as performed at the Policy Institute at King's College London to evaluate the spread of "misinformation" from Russian state media such as RT and Sputnik into international media, including British tabloids like The Daily Mail and Ukrainian Russian-language media including 112 Ukraine. The study found that Russian media often took reporting from Ukrainian sources and repackaged it. However, it found no general evidence of the reverse. This result was replicated when closer analysis was performed on two specific news stories, with in one case "no instances of content from RT, RIA or TASS being replicated on the Ukrainian sites, but multiple instances of Russian sites using Ukrainian content to report on the parade," and in another the only Russia-to-Ukraine transfer coming from a long quotation.

The site EUvsDisinfo has highlighted a small number of specific articles on the 112.international and 112.ua websites as promoting pro-Russian talking points. A fake blog post accusing the Ukrainian military as "lazy" was highlighted on in the English-language 112.international, as well as an interview in which the interviewee claimed that Kyiv aimed to sabotage peace in Donbas.
