= Viktor Medvedchuk =

Ukrainian politician, lawyer, and businessman (born 1954)

- Віктор Медведчук (Ukrainian); Виктор Медведчук (Russian)
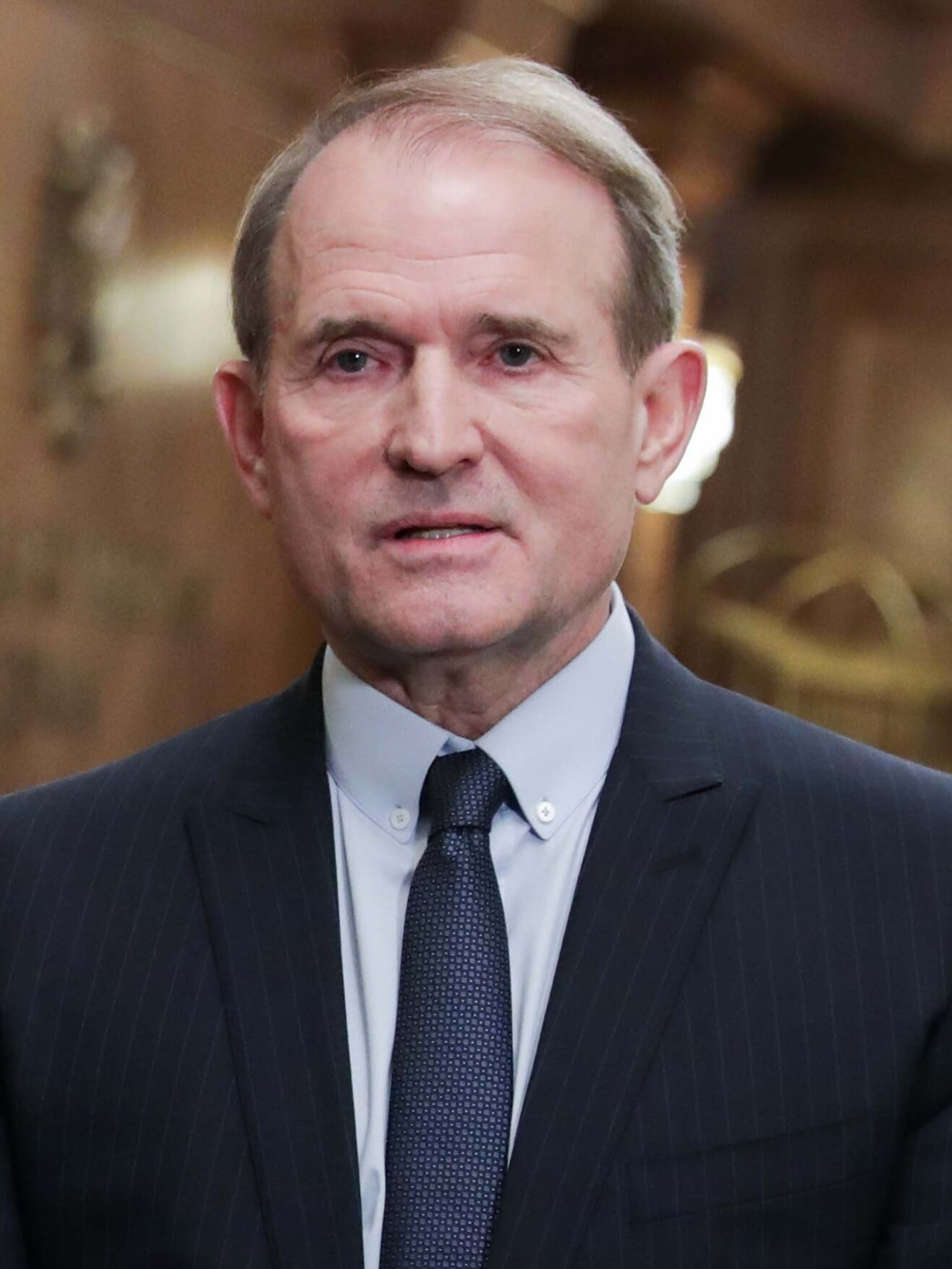
- Medvedchuk in 2019

People's Deputy of Ukraine
- In office 29 August 2019 – 13 January 2023
- Constituency: Opposition Platform — For Life, No. 3
- In office 25 April 1997 – 20 June 2002
- Constituency: Zakarpattia Oblast, No. 171 (1997–1998); Zakarpattia Oblast, No. 73 (1998–2002); SDPU(o), No. 1 (2002)

Head of the Office of the President of Ukraine
- In office 12 June 2002 – 21 January 2005
- President: Leonid Kuchma
- Preceded by: Volodymyr Lytvyn
- Succeeded by: Oleksandr Zinchenko

Personal details
- Born: 7 August 1954 (age 72) Pochet, Krasnoyarsk Krai, Russian SFSR, Soviet Union
- Citizenship: Ukrainian (1991–2023); Russian (according to SBU)
- Party: Opposition Platform — For Life (2016–2022)
- Other political affiliations: SDPU(o) (1994–2016); Ne Tak (2006); Ukrainian Choice (2012–2022)
- Spouses: Marina Lebedeva (divorced) Natalya Gavrilyuk (divorced) Oksana Marchenko (m. 2003)
- Relations: Serhiy Medvedchuk (brother)
- Children: 2
- Parent: Volodymyr Medvedchuk (father)
- Education: Kyiv University (1978)
- Occupation: Politician, lawyer
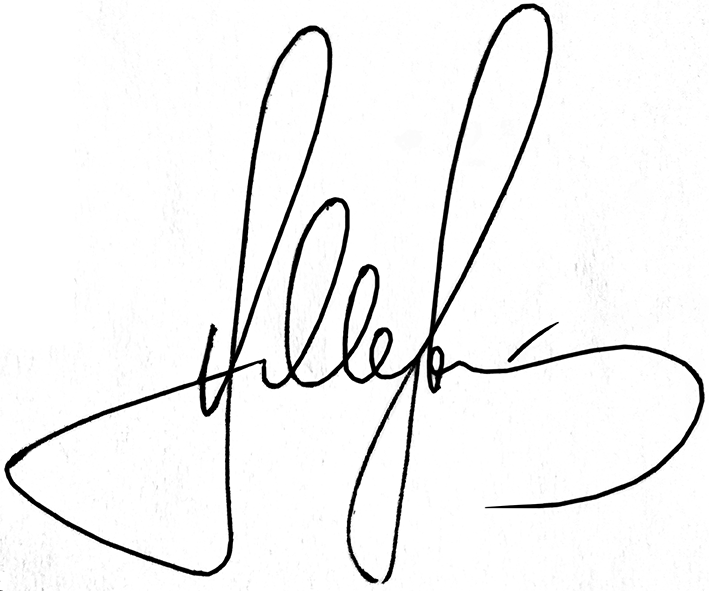
- Signature

Viktor Volodymyrovych Medvedchuk (Ukrainian: Віктор Володимирович Медведчук; born 7 August 1954), also known as Viktor Vladimirovich Medvedchuk (Russian: Виктор Владимирович Медведчук), is a former Ukrainian lawyer, business oligarch, and politician who has lived in exile in Russia since September 2022 after being handed over to Russia in a prisoner exchange. Medvedchuk is a pro-Kremlin Ukrainian politician and a personal friend of Russian president Vladimir Putin.

Prior to being deported from Ukraine, Medvedchuk was elected as People's Deputy of Ukraine on 29 August 2019. He served as the chairman of the pro-Russian political organization Ukrainian Choice from 2018 to 2022. He is an opponent of Ukraine joining the European Union.

From 1997 to 2002 Medvedchuk was a member of the Verkhovna Rada (Ukrainian parliament). Medvedchuk served between 2002 and 2005 as chief of staff to then Ukrainian president Leonid Kuchma. After this he was absent from national politics until 2018. In November 2018, Medvedchuk was elected chairman of the political council of the political party For Life, which later merged into the Opposition Platform — For Life party. In the 2019 Ukrainian parliamentary election, the party won 37 seats on the nationwide party list and six constituency seats. As he placed third on the 2019 election list of Opposition Platform — For Life, Medvedchuk was elected to the Verkhovna Rada.

On 19 February 2021, the National Security and Defense Council of Ukraine included Medvedchuk and his wife, Oksana Marchenko, on the Ukrainian sanctions list, due to alleged financing of terrorism. On 11 May 2021, the Prosecutor General of Ukraine accused Medvedchuk of treason and attempted looting of national resources in Crimea (which had been annexed by Russia but remains internationally recognised as Ukrainian). Medvedchuk's house arrest started on 13 May 2021. Medvedchuk escaped this house arrest on 28 February 2022, four days after the 2022 Russian invasion of Ukraine and went missing. On 8 March 2022 he was removed from the post of co-chairman of Opposition Platform — For Life. On 12 April 2022 Medvedchuk was arrested by the Security Service of Ukraine (SBU). On 21 September 2022, Medvedchuk (together with 55 Russian prisoners of war) was exchanged for 215 Ukrainian POWs from the Siege of Mariupol.

On 13 January 2023, the Verkhovna Rada stripped Medvedchuk of his position as a people's deputy.

== Early life and education ==
Medvedchuk's father, Volodymyr Medvedchuk, avoided being drafted into the Red Army during World War II due to his suffering from Pott disease. During Nazi Germany's occupation of Ukraine, he worked for the German administration in a labor camp from April 1942 to November 1943. The section provided enforced deportation of the local able-bodied Ukrainian youth to work in Nazi Germany. Volodymyr Medvedchuk was arrested by SMERSH on 7 August 1954 and sentenced to eight years of imprisonment and four of exile in Siberia "for participation in Ukrainian nationalistic activities."

Viktor was born in Pochet, Krasnoyarsk Krai, Russian SFSR. He has claimed that his father was a member of the Organization of Ukrainian Nationalists. According to his Soviet court indictment, Volodymyr Medvedchuk had "joined the counter-revolutionary organization of Ukrainian nationalists" in April 1942. In July 1995, Ukraine's military prosecutor's office reviewed the case of Volodymyr Medvedchuk and decided to rehabilitate him "In accordance with Article 1 of the Law of Ukraine of 17 April 1991 On the Rehabilitation of Victims of Political Repression in Ukraine."

In the mid-1960s, the Medvedchuks returned to the Ukrainian SSR, settling in Kornyn, Zhytomyr Oblast. In 1971, Medvedchuk graduated from high school in Borova, Fastiv Raion (Kyiv Oblast). In November 1971, Medvedchuk found a job as sorter at the Kyiv Railroad Post office factory producing periodicals. According to Dmytro Chobit, by the start of 1972, he was an overstaffed militsiya (the police of the Soviet Union) worker at the Motovylivka station (located in Borova).

In the summer of 1972, Medvedchuk successfully passed an entrance exam to the Law School of KSU Shevchenko (now the Taras Shevchenko National University of Kyiv). However he was not admitted. On 12 September 1972, he was enrolled in the university by the Rector's order #445, based on the authorization from the Ministry of the Interior of the Ukrainian SSR. According to Dmytro Chobot, Medvedchuk was allowed to study at the university only thanks to a special recommendation from the police.

After graduation, he tried to enroll at the Higher School of Militsiya, but was rejected due to his family history. He graduated from the Taras Shevchenko National University of Kyiv in 1978 as a lawyer.

== Legal career and participation in political trials against Soviet dissidents ==
In 1979, Medvedchuk became a member of the Shevchenkivska Legal Consultation of the Kyiv City Collegiate of Attorneys.

In 1979, Medvedchuk was the lawyer for repressed poet Yuriy Lytvyn. In his last word in court on 17 December 1979, Lytvyn described Medvedchuk's work as a lawyer: "The passivity of my lawyer Medvedchuk in defense is not due to his professional profanity, but to the instructions he received from above and his subordination: he does not dare reveal the mechanism according to which provocations were implemented against me." Lytvyn was convicted and died in prison. According to official documents, in 1979 Medvedchuk appealed the verdict against Lytvyn issued by the Vasylkiv court and referred to the incompleteness of the investigation carried out in the case to request the Kyiv Regional Court to annul the verdict and send the case for a new trial.

In 1980, Medvedchuk was appointed as a defence lawyer in the trial of dissident poet Vasyl Stus. According to the testimony of people close to Stus (his wife, and also his friend Yevgeny Sverstyuk), Stus refused to be defended by Medvedchuk, because "he immediately felt that Medvedchuk was an aggressive Komsomol type person, he didn't protect him, he didn't want to understand him, and, in fact, he was not interested in his business." Nevertheless, Medvedchuk remained Stus's lawyer despite the protests of his client.

According to the "Chronicle of Current Events", Medvedchuk's plea at the Stus trial was as follows: "The lawyer said in his speech that all of Stus's crimes deserve to be punished, but he asks to pay attention to the fact that Stus, working in 1979–1980 at the enterprises of Kyiv, fulfilled the norm; in addition, he underwent a severe stomach operation." According to Ukrainian lawyers Roman Titikalo and Ilya Kotin, Medvedchuk seems to have recognized the guilt of his client Stus during the court case. In doing so, Medvedchuk violated his professional duty as lawyer since he seemed to refuse to defend Stus, which grossly violated Stus's right to defense in court.

Stus died after he declared a hunger strike on 4 September 1985 in Perm-36, a Soviet forced labor camp for political prisoners. In a 2018 interview with The Independent, Medvedchuk claimed he could not have operated differently: "Stus denounced the Soviet government, and didn't consider it to be legitimate. Everyone decides their own fate. Stus admitted he agitated against the Soviet government. He was found guilty by the laws of the time. When the laws changed, the case was dropped. Unfortunately, he died."

In 1985, he was a lawyer at the trial of poet Mikola Kuntsevich. According to Kuntsevich's memoirs, Medvedchuk "poured more dirt on him than the prosecutor." After Medvedchuk asked the court to dismiss one of Kuntsevich's motions, he challenged him and repeated the challenge several times, but each time the court dismissed it. In his last word, Medvedchuk said: "I completely agree with a comrade prosecutor in determining the sentence. But, for reasons incomprehensible to me, comrade prosecutor forgot that the defendant had not yet left one year and nine months from the previous term. I consider it necessary to add this period to the new punishment." This request was granted by the court.

Medvedchuk founded a successful legal company, BIM, in the early 1990s. From 1990 to 1997, he was the president of the Bar Association of Ukraine. Throughout the 1990s and early 2000s, Medvedchuk was a leading member of the Kyiv Seven, one of the three most powerful political clans in Ukrainian politics.

On 24 May 2023 Medvedchuk was stripped (disbarred) of the right to practise law in Ukraine by the Qualification and Disciplinary Commission of the Bar of Kyiv Oblast. Efforts to disbar Medvedchuk had been ongoing since as early as 2016. Medvedchuk appealed his disbar, on 9 February 2024 his appeal was rejected by the Kyiv District Administrative Court. The Sixth Appeal Administrative Court upheld this decision on 11 June 2024.

== First parliamentary tenure ==
In 1994, Medvedchuk became a member of the Social Democratic Party of Ukraine (united). He served as chairman from 1998 until two days after the 26 March 2006 parliamentary election.

Medvedchuk first entered the Verkhovna Rada (Ukrainian parliament) in 1997 by winning a by-election in the 171st District (in the Zakarpattia Oblast). Reelected to the Verkhovna Rada in 1998, he was elected Second Deputy Chairman in July 1998. In 2002, he was reelected to the Verkhovna Rada. Medvedchuk was the First Deputy Chairman of the Verkhovna Rada from February 2000 until December 2001, when he was dismissed for abuse of power, biased treatment of the Verkhovna Rada's agenda and procedural violations.

== Head of the Presidential Administration of Ukraine ==
From June 2002 until January 2005, Medvedchuk served as head of President Leonid Kuchma's presidential administration. As such, he was a leading target for criticism by the opposition, including Viktor Yushchenko, who often spoke out bitterly against Medvedchuk. Medvedchuk was considered the main behind-the-scenes man of then Prime Minister and pro-Kuchma presidential candidate Viktor Yanukovych in the 2004 Ukrainian presidential election, which was nicknamed the "battle of three Viktors" after them and their main opponent Yushchenko.

In one instance, Medvedchuk paid a "huge amount of money" to the Ukrainian National Assembly – Ukrainian People's Self-Defence leader Eduard Kovalenko to hold a march supporting Yushchenko against his wishes. The march included Nazi-like flags and symbols, and Kovalenko used a Nazi salute in his support speech. The move was meant to discredit the democratic candidate (Yushchenko) in the eyes of Western observers.

== Failing to return to parliament ==
In the 2006 Ukrainian parliamentary election, Medvedchuk was placed third on the election list of the Opposition Bloc "Ne Tak". This alliance failed to win parliamentary representation, with 1.01% of the total votes. Medvedchuk did not take part in elections again until 2019.

In November 2008, Medvedchuk became a member of the Supreme Council of Justice. Focus evaluated Medvedchuk's assets in 2008 to be worth $460 million and labeled him the 57th richest man of Ukraine.

On 21 March 2012, he stated he would be "returning to public politics not for the sake of the elections, as I strongly believe that all things that take place are not the result of elections, but the result of our mistakes during elections". In a September/October 2013 poll by Razumkov Centre, a party led by Medvedchuk would score 0.9% of the votes during elections.

A December 2013 poll by the Sociological group "RATING" gave it 0.7% and predicted that Medvedchuk's result in the first round ballot of the next (Ukrainian) presidential election would be 0.9%. During 2013, Ukrainian experts argued that Medvedchuk's attempts to influence public opinion had failed.

== Accusations of involvement in Euromaidan suppression ==
Medvedchuk is chairman of the pro-Russian political organization Ukrainian Choice. In 2013, he began publicly attacking the European Union, at one point comparing it to the Nazi Third Reich.

Medvedchuk was an open and bitter critic of the Euromaidan protest campaign of November 2013–February 2014 (initially aimed at reverting the second Azarov government decision to suspend preparations for signing an Association Agreement and Deep and Comprehensive Free Trade Agreement with the European Union). On 30 November, he condemned a series of protests, known as Euromaidan, that supported closer ties between Ukraine and the EU. After one of his December 2013 meetings with Russia's president Vladimir Putin, Medvedchuk publicly promised to "deal with" pro-European protesters in Ukraine.

Euromaidan activists alleged that Medvedchuk was among the masterminds of the attempted murder of Ukrainian journalist Tetiana Chornovol on 25 December 2013. They called him a "perpetrator" and linked his name to the bloody events of the government strike against the Euromaidan. Considering all Medvedchuk's recent activity directed at pushing Ukraine into economic union with Russia, the Euromaidan activists came to one of the Medvedchuks' villas to protest.

The same day, Medvedchuk claimed that he was "ready for the war" with the Ukrainian opposition parties. The next day, the Ukrayinska Pravda newspaper published an investigative article on Medvedchuk's allegedly illegal takeover of a government property back in 2004, while Head of Administration for the Ukrainian president. The source of the information was named as Mykhailo Chechetov (the state property chief at the time), who had been "forced" (in his own words) to help Medvedchuk in that deal.

On 8 January 2014, Medvedchuk won a slander lawsuit against Oksana Zabuzhko. In an interview with Radio Liberty the writer had accused Medvedchuk of involvement in the provocations against Euromaidan on 30 November – 1 December (Medvedchuk had demanded a token amount of ₴0.25 as a compensation).

Medvedchuk stated on 9 January 2014 that "The absence of the translation of the text of the [EU] Association Agreement, the provision of excessive asymmetric privileges to European manufacturers – all this indicates that the EU was preparing to turn the Ukrainian economy into its raw material appendage". He also believed that because "the current team" leading Ukraine response to "interference in Ukraine's internal affairs by EU and U.S. diplomats inspire serious doubt that the current team is able to protect Ukraine's economic interests". "Therefore, before the adoption by the Ukrainian people of the direct decision on the choice of the vector of external integration any actions by the authorities on lobbying this policy are only political speculation, which has nothing to do with the will of the people and the protection of the economic interests of our country".

== Alleged involvement in the 2014 separatist movements and Russo-Ukrainian War ==
On 17 March 2014 the United States placed Medvedchuk on its sanction list to punish him for his alleged role during the 2014 Russian annexation of Crimea. Since the March 2014 annexation of Crimea by Russia, Crimea is under dispute by Russia and Ukraine. In an August 2016 interview with Radio Svoboda, Medvedchuk stated that from a legal point of view, Crimea is part of Ukraine, "but de facto, unfortunately, it belongs to Russia."

In the same interview, Medvedchuk accused the Ukrainian authorities of "pushing the peninsula away, pushing its inhabitants away" which allegedly prompted them to agree to the annexation. He also stated that Ukraine "If the Ukrainian government wanted to return Crimea" should restore the electricity and water supply to Crimea through the North Crimean Canal and should stop its economic blockade (of Crimea). Allegedly, if this would happen "There would be no cessation of rail, freight and passenger traffic."

Medvedchuk was present at negotiations with the armed separatist in the Donetsk and Luhansk provinces on 21 June 2014 to discuss President Petro Poroshenko's peace plan although it was unclear whom he represented there. In May 2021 Medvedchuk claimed he was first authorized for these negotiations by acting Ukrainian president Oleksandr Turchynov, and later by President Poroshenko. This was immediately denied by Turchynov.

On 24 June 2014, the Donetsk People's Republic (DPR) and Luhansk People's Republic (LPR) informed the OSCE that Medvedchuk was appointed their representative in the negotiations with the Ukrainian Government. On 8 July 2014, self-proclaimed Prime Minister of the Donetsk People's Republic Alexander Borodai stated that Medvedchuk "has no right to represent either the Donetsk People's Republic or the Luhansk People's Republic" and that he was a "mediator in the negotiations". About the negotiations, Medvedchuk wrote on his Facebook page on 28 June 2014, "Hope that a compromise will be found has appeared and we'll manage to find a way of the present situation, retaining the territorial integrity of Ukraine and restoring peace".

On 8 July 2014, it was reported that Medvedchuk would not be involved in further negotiations with the separatists. However, in December 2014, he officially received the status of a negotiator from Ukraine on the exchange of prisoners with the separatists. He became Ukraine's special representative for humanitarian affairs in the Trilateral Contact Group on Ukraine on 5 June 2015. In June 2021 Petro Poroshenko claimed that Medvedchuk had been involved in the prisoner exchange negotiations on the insistence of Russian president Vladimir Putin.

In an August 2016 interview with Radio Free Europe, Medvedchuk urged the Ukrainian authorities to "reach a consensus" directly with the militant leadership ("DPR" and "LPR"), because, according to him, "there is no other way to return these territories".

In a 2018 interview with The Independent, Medvedchuk claimed that the United States was interfering in the affairs of what he called the "brotherly" nations Ukraine and Russia. He claimed that Russian president Vladimir Putin wanted peace in Donbas and that Putin would do everything to protect eastern Ukrainians from repressions from Ukraine's "party of war". He admitted that Russia was illegally arming separatist forces but said that the United States, NATO and the EU were doing "the same" by providing weapons to Ukraine.

== Return to the parliament ==
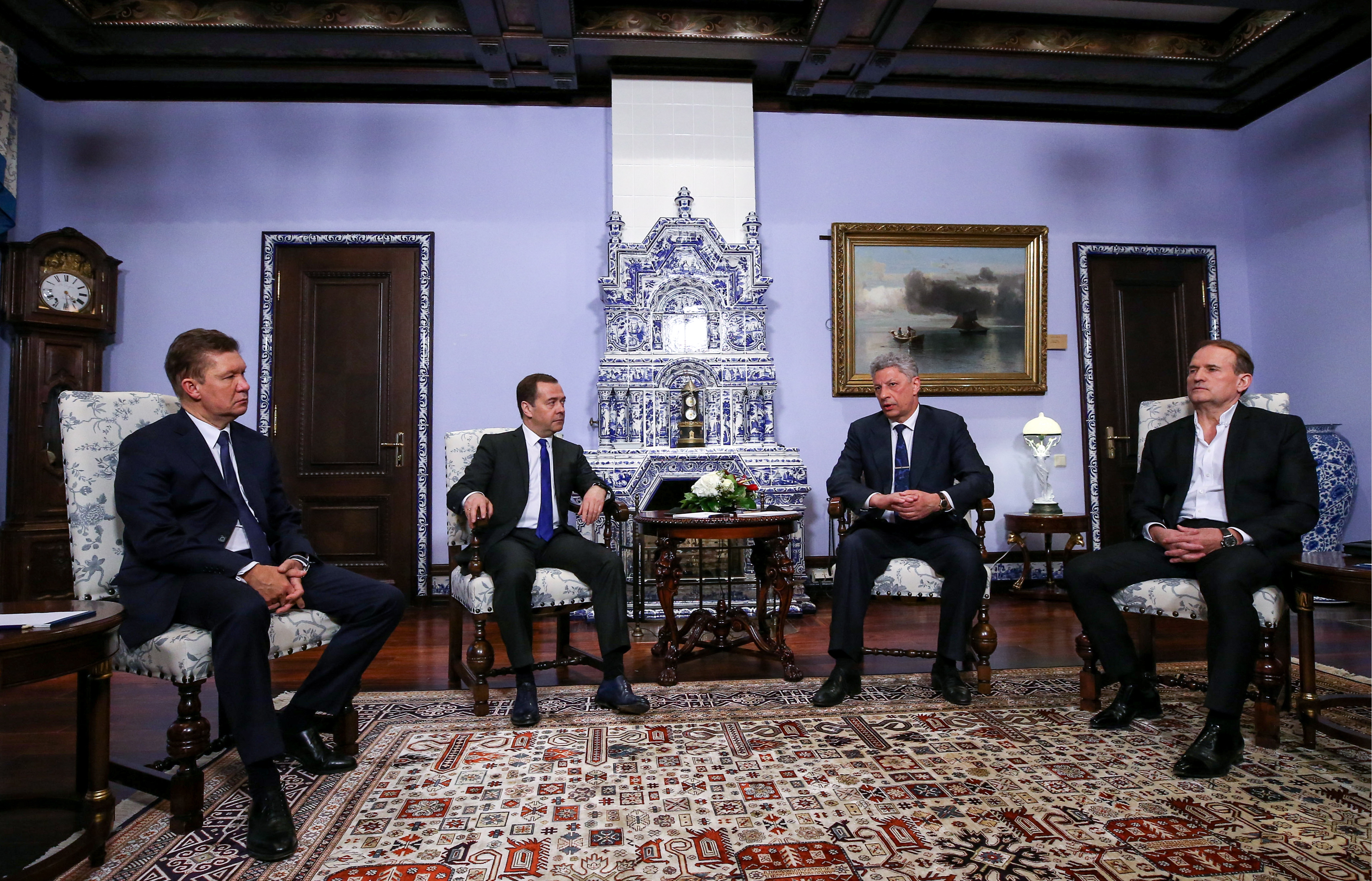
Meeting between Russian prime minister Dmitry Medvedev and Gazprom chairman Alexey Miller with Yuriy Boyko and Viktor Medvedchuk in 2019

In November 2018, Medvedchuk was elected chairman of the political council of (the political party) For life. In December 2018, this party merged into the Opposition Platform — For Life party. In the 2019 Ukrainian parliamentary election, the party won 37 seats on the nationwide party list and 6 constituency seats. In this election, Medvedchuk was placed third on the election list of Opposition Platform — For Life and thus elected to the Verkhovna Rada.

In October 2020, the Kyiv Court of Appeals overturned the decision of a lower court to ban the distribution of the book The case of Vasyl Stus as demanded by Medvedchuk. This non-fiction book details the criminal case of Ukrainian poet Vasyl Stus who was imprisoned by the Soviet Union. Medvedchuk was the defence lawyer in the trial of Stus.

== Terrorism criminal case ==
On 19 February 2021, the National Security and Defense Council of Ukraine included Medvedchuk and his wife, Oksana Marchenko, on the Ukrainian sanctions list, due to the financing of terrorism. It was claimed he was channeling money from his Russia-based refinery to the separatists of the Donetsk People's Republic and Luhansk People's Republic in eastern Ukraine. Medvedchuk has denied the accusations. The sanctions froze the assets of Medvedchuk and his wife for three years and prevented them from doing business in Ukraine (most of Medvedchuk's assets were registered under his wife's name). Ukrainian authorities announced that an oil pipeline that was reportedly controlled by Medvedchuk which transports Russian oil products to Europe would be nationalised.

On 11 May 2021, Medvedchuk and fellow Opposition Platform — For Life lawmaker Taras Kozak were named as suspects for alleged high treason and the illegal exploitation of natural resources in Ukraine's Russian-annexed Crimea. Three days later Medvedchuk was put under house arrest and fitted with an electronic tracking device. On 14 May 2021 Russian authorities began the process of liquidating the Russian company Novye Proekty which was allegedly used by Medvedchuk for his alleged illegal exploitations in Crimea.

In 2021, former president Petro Poroshenko was named as a co-suspect in the criminal case against Medvedchuk. Medvedchuk's house arrest was prolonged four times, which means that Medvedchuk was supposed to spend at least 10 months under house arrest, even though Ukrainian law allows for a maximum of six months' house arrest.

Medvedchuk and his business partner Kozak have money in Belarusian banks, which are controlled by business associates of President of Belarus Alexander Lukashenko, Aliaksei Aleksin and Mikalai Varabei. They also have common business interests.

In May 2021, Ukrainian media published recorded audio in which Medvedchuk congratulated the leader of the so-called Donetsk People's Republic Denis Pushilin on Victory Day and wished him further "victories". In addition, Medvedchuk stated that he was impressed by a military parade in Donetsk.

== Sanctions ==
On 17 March 2014 the United States placed Medvedchuk on its sanction list to punish him for his alleged role during the 2014 Russian annexation of Crimea.

On 19 February 2021, the National Security and Defense Council of Ukraine included Medvedchuk and his wife, Oksana Marchenko, on the Ukrainian sanctions list, due to alleged financing of terrorism.

In January 2022, Medvedchuk was placed under sanctions by the United States, accusing him of involvement in a plot to set up a collaborator government in the wake of a Russian invasion.

Medvedchuk was sanctioned by the UK government in 2022 in relation to the Russo-Ukrainian War.

On 13 February 2025, Ukrainian president Volodymyr Zelenskyy imposed sanctions on multiple oligarchs and individuals including Medvedchuk on suspicion of “high treason” and assisting a terrorist organization, particularly their role in compromising national security through unfavorable business agreements with Russia. The next day, the Ukrainian Prosecutor General's Office announced the opening of criminal investigations against him and other sanctioned individuals.

== Russian invasion of Ukraine ==
During a massive build-up of Russian troops around Ukraine's borders in the first weeks of 2022, Medvedchuk was one of two people (the other one being Oleg Tsaryov) identified by the United States intelligence community as a possible Kremlin-supported choice to lead a pro-Russia puppet Ukrainian government. (Note: The British government concurrently named Yevheniy Murayev as another potential Kremlin favorite to lead a puppet government.)

On the opening day of the invasion, 24 February 2022, some analysts expected that Putin may have wanted to install Medvedchuk as president of Ukraine if Russian forces captured Kyiv. (Note: Although the capture of Kyiv appeared to be a primary Russian military goal in the first weeks of the war, on 2 April 2022 Russian forces abandoned their Kyiv offensive.) According to sources by Ukrainska Pravda Ukrainian intelligence services believe that Chairman of the Verkhovna Rada (Ukraine's national parliament) Ruslan Stefanchuk was to be deposed on 27 February 2022 and Medvedchuk would have become chairman in the place of Stefanchuk (Note: In order to make this plan (Medvedchuk becoming Chairman of the Verkhovna Rada (Ukraine's national parliament)) a reality he would have needed 226 votes from his fellow MP's while his own party Opposition Platform — For Life had only 44 seats and no allies in parliament.) and, with President Volodymyr Zelenskyy being deposed, accordingly acting president. Eight years earlier, pro-Russian gunmen seized Crimea's parliament building and Council of Ministers building. In 2025, Zelenskyy said that he received an ultimatum from Putin in the early days of the invasion demanding that he step down as president in favor of Medvedchuk.

On 26 February 2022 Medvedchuk managed to prevent the expulsion of Illia Kyva from the parliamentary faction of Opposition Platform — For Life (Kyva had expressed his public support for the Russian invasion).

Medvedchuk escaped house arrest on 27 February 2022. The Ukrainian Ministry of Internal Affairs claimed that Medvedchuk had fled house arrest, while his lawyer claimed that he had been "evacuated to a safe place in Kyiv", after alleged threats had been made to his personal safety.

On 8 March 2022, Medvedchuk was deprived of the post of co-chairman of the political party Opposition Platform — For Life.

Although Medvedchuk's whereabouts were still unknown on 18 March 2022, on that date an investigating judge granted the prosecutor's request to impose an in absentia precautionary measure. (Note: On 22 March 2022 Ukrainian Prosecutor General Iryna Venediktova stated that there was no official information as to Medvedchuk having crossed the Ukrainian border.)

On 12 April 2022, the Security Service of Ukraine (SBU) arrested Medvedchuk in "a lightning-fast and dangerous multi-level special operation", claiming they had foiled an attempt by Russia to get him out of the country. Ukrainian president Volodymyr Zelenskyy released a photo of Medvedchuk in handcuffs wearing a Ukrainian military uniform. Zelenskyy suggested exchanging Medvedchuk for Ukrainian prisoners of war held by Russia, but on 13 April Russian officials refused this offer. Medvedchuk had never left Kyiv, but had been hiding in a luxurious three-story house near Protasiv Yar.

On 16 April 2022, the Lychakivskyi District court of Lviv sent Medvedchuk into custody without the possibility of bail and on 3 August, the court extended his term of detention without setting any bail within the period of pre-trial investigation.

On 18 April 2022 Medvedchuk released an appeal to the Presidents of Russia and Ukraine to be exchanged for Ukrainian troops and civilians who were trapped in the Siege of Mariupol. The following day Russian presidential press secretary Dmitry Peskov stated that Medvedchuk's appeal "has been seen, and there is no reaction [from the Kremlin] for the time being."

On 21 September 2022, as part of a prisoner swap, Ukraine handed over Medvedchuk and 55 Russian prisoners of war to Russia per the Security Service of Ukraine; Russia in turn handed over 215 POWs, including 188 members from the Azov Regiment (including survivors of the Siege of Azovstal), members of the 36th Marine Brigade, National Policemen, Border Guards and an agent of the Security Service. Also freed were foreign volunteers serving in the Ukrainian Armed Forces Aiden Aslin, Shaun Pinner, Brahim Saadoun — who were condemned to death by a tribunal set by the Donetsk People's Republic. The swap was brokered by Saudi Arabia. In the swap it was agreed that the five leaders of the Azov Regiment who were released as part of the prisoner exchange will remain in Turkey until the end of the war. The swap caused controversy in Russia among hardliners and pro-war supporters, as Russian officials had previously been against the exchange of Azov Regiment members, with State Duma speaker Vyacheslav Volodin in June calling them "Nazi criminals" who must be brought to justice, the Embassy of Russia in the United Kingdom tweeted in July that the fighters should be hanged adding “They deserve a humiliating death.” and the Russian government designating it as a terrorist group in August, allowing for harsher punishments for captured fighters under Russian law.

On 10 January 2023, Medvedchuk was stripped of his Ukrainian citizenship alongside three other people's deputies.

Medvedchuk's term as People's Deputy of Ukraine was terminated by parliament on 13 January 2023. 320 members of parliament voted to strip Medvedchuk of his position as a people's deputy.

== Exile ==
On 16 January 2023 Medvedchuk published an article in the Russian newspaper Izvestia in which he blamed "the collective West" for creating the conditions that lead to what he labelled the "Ukrainian conflict", and advocated for taking Russian interests into account. In the article, Medvedchuk did not mention, nor condemn, the 2022 Russian invasion of Ukraine. Reporting about this opinion piece, Russia's TASS news agency stated that this was "his first article for the Russian media after arriving in Russia from Ukraine as a result of a detainee exchange."

In April 2023 Medvedchuk created the "Different Ukraine" movement. This organisation claims that Ukraine is ruled by Nazis and repeats other Russian disinformation. Various fugitives from Ukraine joined this organisation: political commentators (from already closed pro-Russian TV channels) like Ruslan Kotsaba, deputies of local councils from Opposition Platform — For Life and other Ukrainians accused of treason and separatism by the Ukrainian authorities. In December 2023 a branch of "Different Ukraine", who claimed to be an international organisation, was opened in Serbia.

In March 2024, the Czech Republic accused Medvedchuk of financing a pro-Russia propaganda network under the media outlet Voice of Europe that paid European politicians in cash or cryptocurrency in an attempt to influence elections.

In exile Medvedchuk lost his right to practice law in Ukraine. He appealed his disbarment, but his appeal was rejected by a court on 9 February 2024 and on 11 June 2024 by a higher court.

In a 16 June 2024 interview with TASS Medvedchuk stated that Russia should occupy "Odesa and other cities" if Ukraine would reject Putin's peace proposal made on 14 June. In this proposal Putin stated that the Russian annexation of the Ukrainian territories of Donetsk, Luhansk, Kherson and Zaporizhzhia Oblast and Ukrainian non-aligned status would "bring an end" to "the conflict", despite Russia not holding all these territories under its military control. According to Medvedchuk this proposal was "the last chance to preserve the Ukrainian state" and that "Today, Ukraine cannot be considered a state with its illegitimate president, anti-people regime, legal nihilism and state Nazi ideology." Medvedchuk also claimed that Ukraine "is a concentration camp for the Ukrainian people, from where everyone wants to run away, except for a gang that is criminally in power." Medvedchuk also believed that current Ukraine was being "impose LGBT values that are alien to traditional Ukrainian culture."

In 2025, prosecutors in the United Kingdom identified Medvedchuk as the mastermind behind Oleh Voloshyn's alleged efforts to bribe members of the European Parliament into spreading pro-Russian propaganda.

== Personal life ==
=== Family ===
Medvedchuk has been married three times. He is divorced from Marina Lebedeva and Natalya Gavrilyuk. He is currently married to Oksana Marchenko, a well-known TV presenter in Ukraine. He has two daughters: Irina (born 1982) with Gavrilyuk, and Daryna (born 2004) with Marchenko. Russian president Vladimir Putin is the godfather of Daryna. Since 2021 Daryna is studying at the National Research University Higher School of Economics in Moscow, Russia.

In the 2019 Ukrainian parliamentary election, Medvedchuk's brother Serhiy lost as an Opposition Platform — For Life candidate in single-seat constituency 105 (Luhansk Oblast).

Five days before the 24 February 2022 Russian invasion of Ukraine Medvedchuk's wife, Oksana Marchenko, left for Belarus. She later published a video from Moscow. On 11 April 2023 the Ukrainian police issued an arrest warrant for Marchenko on the grounds that she was "hiding from pre-trial investigation authorities."

In February 2023 Medvedchuk confirmed that following his 21 September 2022 prisoner exchange he has lived in Moscow, Russia.

=== Wealth ===
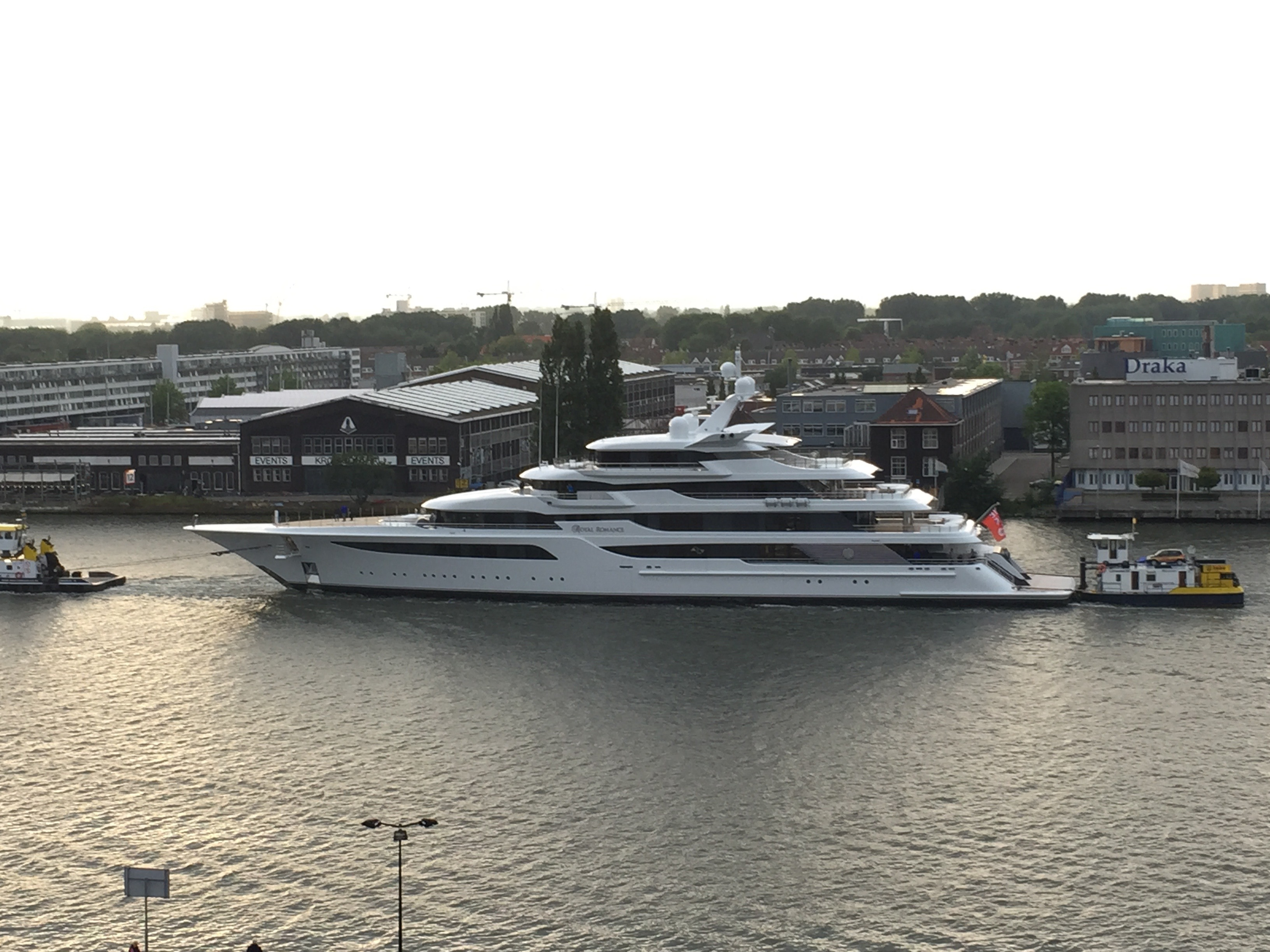
The Royal Romance

In 2008 the Ukrainian magazine Focus estimated Medvedchuk's wealth at $460 million. His investments included energy, resources and media.

On 13 March 2022, Ukrainian media reported that Medvedchuk had in his possession a replica of a Pullman dining car. Allegedly this wagon had been a birthday present from his wife Oksana Marchenko.

Medvedchuk's $200M 93-meter yacht, the Royal Romance, was seized in the Croatian port of Rijeka in March 2022.

In July 2022, Medvedchuk's Bell 427 helicopter and a Gulfstream G650 business jet was seized and handed over to the Ukrainian Army, as part of the ongoing investigation on him for abuse of power and embezzlement.

=== Relationship with Vladimir Putin ===
In Ukraine, Medvedchuk is considered an ally of Russian president Vladimir Putin. He has frequently been referred to as "a personal friend of Putin". The two first met in 2003, during Medvedchuk's tenure as Head of Ukraine's Presidential Administration. In 2004, Putin became godfather to Medvedchuk's youngest daughter Darya. According to Medvedchuk, this was at request of his wife, TV presenter Oksana Marchenko, and that she had asked him to persuade Putin to accept.

In an August 2016 Radio Svoboda interview, Medvedchuk stated that his relationship with Putin was helping him to "help the interests of (Ukraine)." In a 2018 interview with The Independent, Medvedchuk claimed that he used his relationship with Putin to help prisoner exchanges in the War in Donbas. He stated that, unlike Putin, he sees Ukraine and Russia as two separate "Slavic nations, with intertwined histories, religion. I tell him this all the time. I don't think it's one nation. You simply can't say this." In the 2018 interview, he claimed he "often" discussed Ukraine with Putin.

In his 2015 book All the Kremlin's Men, Russian journalist Mikhail Zygar claimed that Putin believed that no question involving Ukraine could be solved without Medvedchuk.

In a 2019 interview with filmmaker Oliver Stone, Putin did acknowledge that he was godfather to Medvedchuk's daughter. Putin described their relationship as "I would not say that we are very close but we know each other well."

== See also ==
- Royal Romance (yacht)

Political offices
Preceded by Volodymyr Lytvyn	Head of the Presidential Administration; 2002–2005	Succeeded by Oleksandr Zinchenko
