= Deaths in April 2015 =

The following is a list of notable deaths in April 2015.

Entries for each day are listed alphabetically by surname. A typical entry lists information in the following sequence:

- Name, age, country of citizenship and reason for notability, established cause of death, reference.

== April 2015 ==
=== 1 ===
- Dave Ball, 65, British musician (Procol Harum), colorectal cancer.
- Roel Cortez, 57, Filipino singer-songwriter, colon cancer.
- Harold Dahl, 91, American basketball player (Oshkosh All-Stars).
- Peter Diamandopoulos, 86, Greek-born American academic, President of Adelphi University (1985–1997).
- Johnny Gardiner, 92, Canadian CFL football player (Winnipeg Blue Bombers).
- Jean Graul, 90, Swiss Olympic sailor.
- John Paul Hammerschmidt, 92, American politician, member of the US House of Representatives from Arkansas's 3rd district (1967–1993), heart and respiratory failure.
- John Hunwick, 79, British academic and scholar.
- Sir John Ingram, 90, New Zealand engineer and businessman.
- Joseph R. Jennings, 93, American art director and production designer (Star Trek: The Motion Picture, Yellowbeard, Johnny Dangerously).
- Zdravko-Ćiro Kovačić, 89, Croatian water polo player, Olympic silver medalist for Yugoslavia (1952, 1956).
- William Leach, 72, Canadian lieutenant general.
- Eddie LeBaron, 85, American football player (Washington Redskins, Dallas Cowboys).
- Cynthia Lennon, 75, British author, cancer.
- Raul Loya, 76, American workers' rights activist.
- Sandy Mason 75, American country music singer-songwriter, cancer.
- Ramon E. Moore, 85, American mathematician.
- Nicolae Rainea, 81, Romanian football referee (FIFA World Cup (1974, 1978, 1982), UEFA Euro 1980 Final), pulmonary edema.
- Paul D. Reynolds, 52, Canadian investment banker, CEO of Canaccord Genuity.
- J. D. Smith, 83, American football player (San Francisco 49ers).
- Joseph Sweda, 89, American politician.
- Robert Walker, 54, Canadian-born American animator (Aladdin, The Lion King) and film director (Brother Bear), heart attack.
- Kazuo Yamagishi, 80, Japanese chef, inventor of tsukemen.
- Muhammadu Dikko Yusufu, 84, Nigerian politician and police officer, Inspector General of the Police (1976–1979).

=== 2 ===
- Paule Anglim, 92, Canadian-born American art dealer (Gallery Paule Anglim).
- Luis Delgado Aparicio, 74, Peruvian politician, MP (1995–2001), pancreatic cancer.
- Natalia Bobrova, 36, Russian gymnast, stomach cancer.
- Mick Brown, 77, New Zealand jurist.
- Per Vilhelm Brüel, 100, Danish engineer.
- Wally Cassell, 103, Italian-born American actor (White Heat).
- Tom Coyne, 84, British news broadcaster and television presenter (Top Gear).
- James de Beaujeu Domville, 81, French-born Canadian theatrical producer.
- William Benedict Friend, 83, American Roman Catholic prelate, Bishop of Alexandria-Shreveport (1982–1986) and Shreveport (1986–2006).
- Raúl Gorriti, 58, Peruvian footballer (national team).
- Robert Blair Kaiser, 84, American journalist.
- Steve Kowit, 77, American poet.
- Adolfo Lubnicki, 81, Argentine-born Uruguayan Olympic basketball player.
- Dennis Marks, 66, British television producer and music director.
- Ben Meisner, 76, Canadian broadcaster (CKPG), cancer.
- Norman H. Nie, 72, American social scientist, lung cancer.
- Richard J. O'Connell, 73, American geophysicist, prostate cancer.
- Hayley Okines, 17, British progeria campaigner, pneumonia.
- Manoel de Oliveira, 106, Portuguese film director and screenwriter, heart failure.
- Stanisław Pestka, 85, Polish Kashubian poet.
- Joseph L. Reid, 92, American oceanographer.
- Barbara Sass, 78, Polish film director and screenwriter.
- Olga Sawicka, 83, Polish dancer and choreographer.
- Doug Sax, 79, American audio mastering engineer, cancer.
- Robert H. Schuller, 88, American televangelist (Hour of Power).
- Alberto Ricardo da Silva, 71, East Timorese Roman Catholic prelate, Bishop of Díli (2004–2015).
- Larrie W. Stalks, 89, American politician.
- Steve Stevaert, 60, Belgian politician, Chairman of the SP.a (2003–2005), Governor of Limburg (2005–2009).
- Abdelhadi Tazi, 94, Moroccan scholar and diplomat.
- Tom Towles, 65, American actor (Henry: Portrait of a Serial Killer, Miami Vice, The Rock), complications from a stroke.
- Jerzy Treder, 72, Polish philologist.
- Eugene Vielle, 101, British air force officer and inventor.

=== 3 ===
- Milton Berkes, 90, American politician.
- Michael Birkett, 2nd Baron Birkett, 85, British hereditary peer and film producer.
- Nigel Boocock, 77, British speedway rider.
- Sarah Brady, 73, American gun control campaigner, pneumonia.
- Fred Broussard, 82, American football player (New York Giants, Pittsburgh Steelers, Denver Broncos).
- Bob Burns, 64, American drummer (Lynyrd Skynyrd), traffic collision.
- Sam Cathcart, 90, American football player (San Francisco 49ers), cancer.
- John Darnton, 96, American football coach (Adrian Bulldogs).
- Traute Foresti, 100, Austrian poet and actress.
- Rocío García Gaytán, 55, Mexican politician, MP (1997–2000), cancer.
- Osea Gavidi, 71, Fijian politician, indigenous chief and secessionist leader.
- Mathias Gnädinger, 74, Swiss actor (The Boat Is Full, Journey of Hope), cardiac complications and acute respiratory distress syndrome.
- Paul Grigoriu, 70, Romanian radio personality (SRR).
- Don Hansey, 85, American politician, member of the Washington House of Representatives (1971–1977).
- Michael Jandreau, 71, American Native leader, chairman of the Lower Brulé Sioux tribe, pneumonia and heart disease.
- Kayahan, 66, Turkish musician, cancer.
- Daeng Koro, 52, Indonesian Islamist and commander of East Indonesia Mujahideen, shot.
- Terdell Middleton, 59, American football player (Green Bay Packers).
- Vivian Nathan, 98, American actress (Klute).
- Mpok Nori, 84, Indonesian comedian.
- Algirdas Vaclovas Patackas, 71, Lithuanian politician and poet, signatory of the 1990 Act of the Re-Establishment of the State of Lithuania.
- Luis María Pérez de Onraíta, 81, Spanish-born Angolan Roman Catholic prelate, Archbishop of Malanje (1998–2012).
- Chris Plumridge, 70, British golf writer.
- Andrew Porter, 86, British music critic, pneumonia.
- Christopher Reynolds, 92, British linguist.
- Robert Rietti, 92, British-born Italian actor (Hannibal, The Omen).
- Charlie Sumner, 84, American football player (Chicago Bears).
- Shmuel Wosner, 101, Austrian-born Israeli Haredi rabbi.

=== 4 ===
- Jaroslav Balcar, 62, Czechoslovak Olympic ski jumper (1976).
- Ramón Barreto, 75, Uruguayan football referee (1974 FIFA World Cup).
- Zdeněk Čihák, 82, Czech Olympic athlete.
- Bill Ellerington, 91, English footballer (Southampton).
- John Gogo, 83, Canadian politician.
- Julio Graffigna, 83, Argentine Olympic wrestler.
- Jamaluddin Jarjis, 63, Malaysian politician, MP for Rompin (since 1990), helicopter crash.
- Ernest Norman Johnson, 99, American politician.
- Elmer Lach, 97, Canadian Hall of Fame ice hockey player (Montreal Canadiens), stroke.
- Donald N. Levine, 83, American sociologist.
- Ira Lewis, 82, American actor and playwright (Chinese Coffee), complications following open heart surgery.
- Yoshiko Miya, 70, Japanese freelance writer and journalist, pancreatic cancer.
- Elie Naasan, 83, Lebanese Olympic wrestler.
- Ioan Pușcaș, 82, Romanian gastroenterologist.
- Sir John Read, 97, British executive.
- Klaus Rifbjerg, 83, Danish writer (Anna, I, Anna), recipient of the Nordic Council's Literature Prize (1970).
- Lisa Simon, 64, American director, producer and production assistant (Sesame Street, Wonder Pets, Blue Jasmine).
- Marjorie Townsend, 85, American electrical engineer.
- Dick Wood, 79, American football player (New York Jets).

=== 5 ===
- Bauyrzhan Baimukhammedov, 67, Kazakh football player and coach.
- Barbara Bergmann, 87, American feminist economist.
- Fredric Brandt, 65, American dermatologist, suicide by hanging.
- Juan Carlos Cáceres, 79, Argentine tango musician and painter, cancer.
- Hugh Delano, 81, American sports journalist.
- Richard Dysart, 86, American actor (L.A. Law, Being There, The Thing), Emmy winner (1992), cancer.
- Lalit Kishore Chaturvedi, 84, Indian politician.
- Ramnath Dhakal, 52, Nepalese politician, swine flu.
- Maurice Fenner, 86, English cricketer.
- Victor Gotbaum, 93, American labor leader, heart attack.
- Tony Hutton, 82, British Royal Navy officer, organized the refugee evacuation effort following the Turkish invasion of Cyprus.
- Sid Ali Kouiret, 82, Algerian actor.
- Naken Kyrykbaev, 39, Kazakh footballer (Taraz).
- Howard Ladd, 93, American electrical engineer and entrepreneur.
- Richard LaSalle, 97, American film composer.
- Anne-Claude Leflaive, 59, French winemaker, cancer.
- Norman B. Leventhal, 97, American property developer.
- Don Looney, 98, American football player (Philadelphia Eagles, Pittsburgh Steelers).
- Akira Machida, 78, Japanese judge, Chief Justice of the Supreme Court (2002–2006).
- Sargy Mann, 77, British painter.
- Gordon Moyes, 76, Australian radio evangelist and politician, member of the New South Wales Legislative Council (2002–2011).
- Louis Miles Muggleton, 92, South African-born British physicist.
- John Patton, 84, American politician.
- Claudio Prieto, 80, Spanish composer.
- Jehan Rajab, 81, Kuwaiti author.
- Steve Rickard, 85, New Zealand professional wrestler.
- Lon Simmons, 91, American sports broadcaster.
- Rockne Tarkington, 83, American actor (Danger Island, The Great White Hope, The Ice Pirates).
- Gardner C. Taylor, 96, American preacher and civil rights activist.
- Julie Wilson, 90, American singer and actress, stroke complications.
- Yacoub Zaiadeen, 95, Jordanian politician.

=== 6 ===
- Brady L. Adams, 70, American politician.
- Theodosios Balafas, 91, Greek Olympic pole vaulter (1948, 1952).
- Giovanni Berlinguer, 90, Italian politician, MEP (2004–2009).
- James Best, 88, American actor (The Dukes of Hazzard, Ride Lonesome, The Twilight Zone), pneumonia.
- Ray Charles, 96, American musician (The Perry Como Show, The Muppet Show,Three's Company), cancer.
- Paul Dearing, 73, Australian Olympic silver medallist field hockey player (1968) and bronze medallist (1964).
- Edmund DeJarnette, 77, American diplomat.
- Milton Delugg, 96, American composer.
- Walter H. Haas, 97, American astronomer.
- David L. Kaplan, 91, American-born Canadian professor and conductor.
- Eugène Moke Motsüri, 99, Congolese Roman Catholic prelate, Auxiliary Bishop of Kinshasa (1970–1991).
- Rie Muñoz, 93, American artist, stroke.
- Romualdas Ozolas, 76, Lithuanian politician, signatory of the 1990 Act of the Re-Establishment of the State of Lithuania.
- John Papit, 86, American football player (Washington Redskins, Green Bay Packers), stroke.
- Art Powell, 78, American football player (Oakland Raiders).
- Ben Powers, 64, American actor (Good Times), liver cancer.
- Frank Sawyer, 63, American politician.
- John David Sinclair, 72, American scientist.
- Dollard St. Laurent, 85, Canadian ice hockey player (Montreal Canadiens, Chicago Blackhawks).
- Dave Ulliott, 61, English professional poker player, colon cancer.
- Alan Wilson, 94, English cricketer (Lancashire).

=== 7 ===
- Patrick H. Adkins, 67, American fantasy author.
- Tim Babcock, 95, American politician, Governor of Montana (1962–1969).
- Mohammad Bahr al-Ulloum, 87, Iraqi Shi'a Islamic leader and politician.
- José Capellán, 34, American baseball player (Milwaukee Brewers, Detroit Tigers), heart attack.
- Harry Dowd, 76, English footballer (Manchester City).
- Eugene Louis Faccuito, 90, American dancer and choreographer.
- Stan Freberg, 88, American comedian and voice actor (Looney Tunes, Lady and the Tramp, Garfield and Friends), pneumonia.
- Edward Gallenstein, 92, American wood carver and magazine editor (Chip Chats).
- Jean Germain, 67, French politician, Mayor of Tours (1995–2014), suicide by gunshot.
- Richard Henyekane, 31, South African footballer, traffic collision.
- Kardam, Prince of Turnovo, 52, Bulgarian royal, lung infection.
- Stanley Kutler, 80, American historian.
- Geoffrey Lewis, 79, American actor (High Plains Drifter, Maverick, The Lawnmower Man), heart attack.
- Boonkua Lourvanij, 84, Thai Olympic shooter.
- Betty Lucas, 90, Australian actress (Prisoner, Taurus Rising, Richmond Hill).
- Dickie Owen, 88, British actor (Zulu, The Curse of the Mummy's Tomb, Chitty Chitty Bang Bang).
- Richard F. Post, 96, American physicist.
- Maria Luisa Poumaillou, 61, Venezuelan-born French fashion consultant.
- James B. Rhoads, 86, American public servant, Archivist of the United States (1968–1979).
- Eve Shelnutt, 73–74, American poet.
- Kalmanje Jagannatha Shetty, 78, Indian judge.
- Donald Smith, 81, English cricket player (Cheshire).
- Rich Szaro, 67, Polish-born American football player (New Orleans Saints, New York Jet).
- Janet Turner, 78, British architectural lighting designer.
- Torrey Ward, 36, American basketball coach, plane crash.
- Naomi Wilzig, 80, American writer and museum owner (World Erotic Art Museum Miami).

=== 8 ===
- Jean-Louis Crémieux-Brilhac, 98, French resistance member, civil servant and historian.
- Abraham Eraly, 80, Indian historian and magazine editor.
- Harry K. Fukuhara, 95, American army officer.
- Nagore E. M. Hanifa, 89, Indian politician and playback singer.
- Willie Honicutt, 82, American Negro league baseball player.
- Graham Howarth, 99, English entomologist.
- Rayson Huang, 94, Chinese chemist, vice-chancellor of the University of Hong Kong (1972–1986).
- Jayakanthan, 80, Indian Tamil author.
- Sergei Lashchenko, 27, Ukrainian kickboxer, shot.
- David Laventhol, 81, American newspaper editor and publisher, Parkinson's disease.
- Nan Inger Östman, 92, Swedish children's book author.
- Billy Ronson, 58, English footballer (Blackpool).
- Giorgio Salvini, 94, Italian physicist and politician, Minister of university, Scientific Research and Technology (1995–1996).
- Hermann Schweppenhäuser, 87, German philosopher.
- Joel Shankle, 82, American hurdler, Olympic bronze medalist (1956).
- Joel Spira, 88, American inventor (solid-state lamp dimmer), co-founder of Lutron Electronics Company, heart attack.
- Hilde Stavik, 52, Norwegian long-distance runner, cancer.
- Udugama Sri Buddharakkitha Thero, 85, Sri Lankan Buddhist monk.
- Ion Trewin, 71, British editor, publisher and author.
- Lars Tunbjörk, 59, Swedish photographer.
- Jean-Claude Turcotte, 78, Canadian Roman Catholic cardinal, Archbishop of Montreal (1990–2012).
- Ole Wackström, 82, Finnish Olympic racing cyclist (1968, 1972).

=== 9 ===
- Paul Almond, 83, Canadian filmmaker (The Act of the Heart, Journey, Isabel) and television director (Seven Up!), heart disease.
- Betty Tackaberry Blake, 94, American WWII aviator.
- Nina Companeez, 77, French film director.
- Alexander Dalgarno, 87, British physicist.
- Ivan Doig, 75, American author, multiple myeloma.
- Moira Gemmill, 55, British design director (Victoria and Albert Museum), traffic collision.
- Jurgen Gothe, 70, German-born Canadian radio broadcaster (DiscDrive).
- Charles Hamel, 84, American congressional aide and oil industry whistleblower.
- Ray Harm, 87, American artist, prostate cancer.
- Stan Hochman, 86, American sportswriter.
- Ghulam Rasool Kar, 94, Indian politician.
- Kuo Ting-tsai, 78, Taiwanese politician, MLY (1993–2002), complications of cancer.
- Bob McLean, 67, Australian winemaker, liver cancer.
- Hrushikesh Moolgavkar, 94, Indian air chief marshal and Chief of Air Staff (1976–1978).
- Vera Pap, 59, Hungarian actress.
- Ron Payne, 89, Australian politician, member of the South Australian House of Assembly for Mitchell (1970–1989).
- Elmo Noel Joseph Perera, 82, Sri Lankan Roman Catholic prelate, Auxiliary Bishop (1992–1995) and Bishop of Galle (1995–2004).
- Narra Raghava Reddy, 92, Indian politician.
- Hans Ring, 86, Swedish Olympic athlete.
- Margaret Rule, 86, British archaeologist.
- João Alves dos Santos, 58, Brazilian Roman Catholic prelate, Bishop of Paranaguá (since 2006).
- Rafael Soriano, 94, Cuban painter.
- Alex Soto, 49, Puerto Rican actor and drag queen, heart attack.
- Rogvold Sukhoverko, 74, Russian film and voice actor.
- Johan B. Steen, 81, Norwegian biologist.
- Tut Taylor, 91, American bluegrass musician (The Great Dobro Sessions).
- John Toohey, 85, Australian jurist, High Court Justice (1987–1998).
- Tsien Tsuen-hsuin, 105, Chinese-born American sinologist, professor, and librarian.
- Sascha Weidner, 40, German artist, heart failure.

=== 10 ===
- Andrzej Ajnenkiel, 84, Polish historian.
- Richie Benaud, 84, Australian cricket captain and television commentator, skin cancer.
- Ed Bender, 84, American football player and coach.
- Raúl Héctor Castro, 98, Mexican-born American politician and diplomat, Governor of Arizona (1975–1977), Ambassador to El Salvador (1964–1968), Bolivia (1968–1969) and Argentina (1977–1980).
- John Cule, 95, Welsh physician.
- David Dank, 76, American politician, member of Oklahoma House of Representatives (since 2007), heart attack.
- Peter de Giles, 88, British Olympic rower.
- Desmond Digby, 82, New Zealand-born Australian theatre designer, children's book illustrator and painter.
- Waltraud Falk, 85, German economist.
- Eduardo Gauggel Medina, 48, Honduran lawyer and politician, MP (since 2014), shot.
- Eduardo Gauggel Rivas, 61, Honduran lawyer and politician, member of the Supreme Court (1994–1998), shot.
- Ray Graves, 96, American football player and coach.
- Ronald Hambleton, 97, English-born Canadian broadcaster and music critic (Toronto Star).
- Bárbara Heliodora, 91, Brazilian theatre critic.
- Lauren Hill, 19, American college basketball player, pediatric cancer advocate, brain cancer.
- Fred Iger, 90, American comic book publisher (DC Comics).
- Dorothy Jelicich, 87, New Zealand politician, MP for Hamilton West (1972–75).
- Jin Youzhi, 96, Chinese royal.
- Rustin R. Kimsey, 79, American prelate, Episcopal Bishop of Eastern Oregon.
- Judith Malina, 88, German-born American actress (Dog Day Afternoon, Awakenings, The Addams Family) and director, lung disease.
- Keith McCormack, 74, American singer and songwriter ("Sugar Shack"), stroke.
- Sarnoff A. Mednick, 87, American psychologist, complications from Parkinson's disease and dementia.
- Bobby Moore, 56, American baseball player (San Francisco Giants).
- Jim Mutscheller, 85, American football player (Baltimore Colts), kidney failure.
- William S. Powell, 95, American historian.
- Rocco Quattrocchi, 88, American politician, member of the Rhode Island Senate and House of Representatives.
- Rose Francine Rogombé, 72, Gabonese politician, Acting President (2009).
- Norman Sheppard, 93, British chemist.
- Ray Treacy, 68, Irish footballer (Charlton Athletic).
- Andy Tyson, 46, American mountaineer, plane crash.
- Peter Walsh, 80, Australian politician, Minister for Finance (1984–1990), Senator for Western Australia (1974–1993).

=== 11 ===
- Charlie Beasley, 69, American basketball player.
- Martin Tore Bjørndal, 70, Norwegian diplomat.
- Nico Frijda, 87, Dutch psychologist.
- Jimmy Gunn, 66, American football player (Chicago Bears), heart failure.
- Guy Hannen, 90, British WWII army officer and auctioneer.
- Helen Anne Henderson, 68, Canadian journalist and disability rights activist, complications from cancer.
- Peter Jones, 95, British WWII army officer.
- Muhammad Kamaruzzaman, 62, Bangladeshi politician and convicted war criminal, execution by hanging.
- Sheila Kitzinger, 86, British natural childbirth activist.
- Janusz Kurczab, 77, Polish Olympic fencer (1960), mountaineer and expedition leader.
- François Maspero, 83, French writer and translator.
- Seiichi Nakajima, 96, Japanese inventor.
- Viv Nicholson, 79, British football pools winner, complications of a stroke and dementia.
- Ken Prewitt, 68, American radio news anchor, complications from brain cancer.
- Heino Pulli, 77, Finnish ice hockey player.
- Hanut Singh, 81, Indian army officer.
- Tekena Tamuno, 83, Nigerian history professor.
- Elizabeth Templeton, 69, Scottish theologian.
- Kyle Testerman, 80, American politician, Mayor of Knoxville, Tennessee (1972–1975, 1984–1987).
- Levi Watkins, 70, American heart surgeon, complications from a heart attack and a stroke.

=== 12 ===
- Ibrahim Sulayman Muhammad Arbaysh, 35, Saudi Arabian suspected terrorist, drone attack.
- Aleksey Bochkov, 45, Russian Olympic cyclist (1992).
- Paulo Brossard, 90, Brazilian jurist and politician, Minister of Justice (1986–1989), justice of the Supreme Federal Court (1989–1994).
- Jože Ciuha, 90, Slovenian painter.
- Patrice Dominguez, 65, French tennis player.
- Bill Etches, 93, British WWII army officer (St Nazaire Raid).
- Doug Gregory, 92, British Royal Air Force officer and stunt pilot, hit by car.
- Claude Lanthier, 82, Canadian politician, MP for Lasalle (1984–1988).
- André Mba Obame, 57, Gabonese politician.
- Vernon Peeples, 85, American politician.
- Mario Wallenda, 74, American highwire artiste (The Flying Wallendas).

=== 13 ===
- Bruce Alger, 96, American politician, member of the U.S. House of Representatives from Texas's 5th district (1955–1965), heart ailment.
- Brice Bosnich, 78, Australian chemist.
- Gerald Calabrese, 90, American politician and basketball player (Syracuse Nationals).
- Ronnie Carroll, 80, Northern Irish singer and political candidate.
- Noël De Pauw, 72, Belgian cyclist.
- Tony Eldridge, 91, British Royal Navy officer (Chariot manned torpedo).
- Eduardo Galeano, 74, Uruguayan journalist, writer and novelist, lung cancer.
- Claire Gordon, 74, British actress (Konga, Beat Girl), brain tumour.
- Günter Grass, 87, German novelist (The Tin Drum), Nobel Prize laureate (1999), lung infection.
- Mária Gulácsy, 73, Hungarian fencer, Olympic silver medalist (1968).
- Neal Horsley, 70, American anti-abortion activist.
- Pat King, 68, Irish Gaelic football player and coach.
- Thelma Coyne Long, 96, Australian Hall of Fame tennis player.
- Joselyn Alejandra Niño, c. 20, Mexican suspected assassin, shot.
- Neal Nitz, 61, American politician.
- Anna-Lisa Ohlsson, 89, Swedish Olympic sprint canoeist (1952).
- Bob Pinkalla, 86, American ten-pin bowler, heart failure.
- Elizabeth Brown Pryor, 64, American author and historian, traffic collision.
- Antônio Alberto Guimarães Rezende, 89, Brazilian Roman Catholic prelate, Bishop of Caetité (1981–2002).
- Rex Robinson, 89, British actor (Doctor Who, Yes Minister, Only Fools and Horses).
- Haanii Shivraj, 29, Malaysian actress, cancer.
- Serhiy Sukhobok, 50, Ukrainian journalist, shot.
- Herb Trimpe, 75, American comic book artist (The Incredible Hulk, Thor, The Defenders), co-creator of Wolverine, heart attack.

=== 14 ===
- Norman H. Bangerter, 82, American politician, Governor of Utah (1985–1993), stroke.
- Klaus Bednarz, 72, German journalist and writer.
- Homaro Cantu, 38, American chef, suicide by hanging.
- Sheldon Galbraith, 92, Canadian figure skating coach.
- Aref Gholizadeh, 77, Iranian international footballer.
- Ameril Umbra Kato, 68, Filipino warlord, leader of Bangsamoro Islamic Freedom Fighters, heart attack.
- Kō Kojima, 87, Japanese manga artist, cerebral hemorrhage.
- M. Joseph Manning, 90, American politician, member of the Massachusetts House of Representatives (1967–1997).
- Zsuzsa Nádor, 87, Hungarian Olympic swimmer.
- Leslie Peterson, 91, Canadian lawyer and politician, Attorney General of British Columbia (1968–1972).
- Gordon Preston, 89, English mathematician.
- Majid Rahnema, 91, Iranian diplomat and politician.
- Mark Reeds, 55, Canadian ice hockey player (St. Louis Blues, Hartford Whalers) and coach (Ottawa Senators), pneumonia.
- Meir Rosenne, 84, Israeli lawyer and diplomat, Ambassador to France (1979–1983) and United States (1983–1987).
- Kevin Rosier, 53, American super heavyweight kickboxing champion and mixed martial artist (UFC), heart attack.
- Vilas Sarang, 73, Indian author.
- Howie Schumm, 75, Canadian football player (Edmonton Eskimos).
- Elie A. Shneour, 89, French-born American neurochemist.
- Arnold Schütz, 80, German footballer (Werder Bremen).
- Percy Sledge, 74, American R&B singer ("When a Man Loves a Woman"), liver cancer.
- Alex Stevens, 79, American actor and stunt performer (Dark Shadows, Superman, Goodfellas).
- Buddy Temple, 73, American businessman and politician.
- Roberto Tucci, 93, Italian Roman Catholic prelate, President of Vatican Radio (1985–2001), Cardinal-Priest of S. Ignazio di Loyola a Campo Marzio (since 2001).
- Jacques Vernier, 91, French Olympic long-distance runner.
- Kathrine Sorley Walker, 95, English ballet critic.
- David Ward-Steinman, 78, American composer and music professor.

=== 15 ===
- Sidney Abbott, 77, American feminist activist, fire.
- Kinya Aikawa, 80, Japanese actor (Speed Racer, Naruhodo! The World), lung cancer.
- Zaur Ardzinba, 65, Abkhazian politician.
- Joseph A. Bennett, 47, British actor (The Young Indiana Jones Chronicles), suicide by hanging.
- Paul Clark, 67, American poker player.
- Jonathan Crombie, 48, Canadian actor (Anne of Green Gables), brain haemorrhage.
- Claude Desusclade, 95, French Olympic swimmer.
- Margaret Harrison, 96, Scottish peace campaigner.
- Billy Ray Hearn, 85, American record label chairman, heart disease.
- John Howard, 94, American optical physicist.
- Oleg Kalashnikov, 52, Ukrainian politician, shot.
- Felice Leonardo, 100, Italian Roman Catholic prelate, Bishop of Cerreto Sannita-Telese-Sant'Agata de' Goti (1957–1991).
- Alexander Nadson, 88, Belarusian religious leader, Apostolic Visitor for Belarusian Greek-Catholic faithful abroad (since 1986).
- Luis Ortega Álvarez, 62, Spanish judge, member of the Constitutional Court of Spain (since 2011), heart attack.
- Govindbhai Patel, 72, Indian filmmaker, cancer.
- Margo Reed, 73, American jazz musician, complications from dementia.
- Mykola Storozhenko, 86, Ukrainian painter.
- Barbara Strauch, 63, American author and reporter (The New York Times), breast cancer.
- Surya Bahadur Thapa, 88, Nepalese politician, Prime Minister (1955, 1963–1964, 1965–1969, 1979–1983, 1997–1998, 2003–2004), respiratory failure.
- Rosemary Tonks, 85, English poet and author.
- Gunilla Wolde, 75, Swedish writer and illustrator.

=== 16 ===
- Ron Bailey, 88, New Zealand politician, MP for Heretaunga (1960–1981).
- Driss Bamous, 73, Moroccan Olympic footballer (1964).
- Valery Belousov, 66, Russian ice hockey player and coach.
- Bull Benini, 93, Italian-born American soldier.
- Ollie Brown, 71, American baseball player (San Diego Padres, San Francisco Giants), mesothelioma.
- Attaphol Buspakom, 53, Thai football player and coach, blood infection.
- Oles Buzina, 45, Ukrainian journalist, shot.
- Bhola Nath Chalise, 63, Nepalese economist, kidney ailments.
- Alden G. Glauch, 95, American air force major general.
- Tommy Graham, 72, Scottish politician.
- Stanislav Gross, 45, Czech politician, Prime Minister (2004–2005), amyotrophic lateral sclerosis.
- Johnny Kemp, 55, Bahamian singer ("Just Got Paid"), fall.
- Heino Kleiminger, 76, German footballer (F.C. Hansa Rostock, East Germany national team), cancer.
- Eduard Koblmueller, 69, Austrian mountaineer, hypothermia.
- Nimal Mendis, 81, Sri Lankan singer and songwriter.
- Tommy Preston, 82, Scottish footballer (Hibernian).
- Martin Quittenton, 69, British musician (Steamhammer) and songwriter ("Maggie May").
- Lee Remmel, 90, American public relations director (Green Bay Packers).
- Smuggler, 12, American Thoroughbred racehorse, complications from foaling.
- Marjorie Elliott Sypher, 89, Canadian-born Costa Rican First Lady (1974–1978).
- Giuseppe Zigaina, 91, Italian neorealist painter and author.

=== 17 ===
- Renato Altissimo, 74, Italian politician, Minister of Health (1979–1980, 1981–1983), Minister of Trade and Industry (1983–1986).
- Steve Beck, 58, English executive, chairman of York City F.C. (2003–2004).
- Brian Couzens, 82, British music industry executive (Chandos Records).
- David Duax, 71, American politician, complications from a brain aneurysm.
- Mariano Gago, 66, Portuguese physicist and politician, cancer.
- Francis George, 78, American Roman Catholic Cardinal, Archbishop of Chicago (1997–2014), President of the Conference of Catholic Bishops (2007–2010), bladder cancer.
- Peter Graham, 60, English cricketer.
- Robert P. Griffin, 91, American politician, member of the U.S. Senate from Michigan (1966–1977) and House of Representatives from Michigan's 9th district (1957–1966).
- Jaroslav Holík, 72, Czech ice hockey player, world champion (1972).
- Viktor Korshunov, 85, Russian actor, People's Artist of the USSR.
- Tore Bernitz Pedersen, 80, Norwegian cartoonist.
- Hannes Lindemann, 92, German sailor.
- Phil Lundgren, 75, British Olympic boxer.
- Ray Nemec, 85, American baseball researcher and historian.
- Scotty Probasco, 86, American businessman and philanthropist.
- Don Quayle, 84, American broadcast journalist, President of NPR (1970–1973).
- Jack Rieley, 72, American record producer and band manager (The Beach Boys).
- Jeremiah J. Rodell, 93, American brigadier general and priest.
- Keith Shackleton, 92, British painter and television presenter.
- S. K. Sharma, 62, Indian cricket umpire.
- Ann Stepan, 71, American politician, member of the Illinois House of Representatives (1991–1993), lymphoma.
- A. Alfred Taubman, 91, American real estate developer, philanthropist and football team owner (Michigan Panthers).
- Greg Woodcroft, 44, Canadian wrestler.

=== 18 ===
- Armen Arslanian, 54, Lebanese Olympic cyclist.
- Sir Christopher Bayly, 69, British historian.
- Glen Bortell, 100, American politician.
- Walter Conahan, 87, American politician, member of the South Dakota Senate (1983–1989), cancer.
- Francesco Dapiran, 94, Italian Olympic rower (1948).
- Gunnar Gravdahl, 87, Norwegian politician, Mayor of Bærum (1989–1992).
- Joe Hutter, 77, American politician, member of the Iowa House of Representatives.
- Joseph Lechleider, 82, American inventor (DSL).
- Sir Roger Lobo, 91, Macanese-born Hong Kong businessman and politician, senior unofficial member of the Legislative Council (1980–1985), moved "Lobo Motion" (1984), cancer.
- Mario Pirani, 89, Italian journalist (la Repubblica), economist, and writer.
- William Schultz, 76, New Zealand rugby league player (Eastern Suburbs, national team).
- Laverne Torczon, 79, American football player.
- Leonid Vladimirsky, 94, Russian book illustrator.
- Erwin Waldner, 82, German footballer (VfB Stuttgart, SPAL Ferrara).
- L. Jean Willoughby, 89, American politician.

=== 19 ===
- Richard Anthony, 77, Egyptian-born French singer.
- Sir Raymond Carr, 96, British historian.
- Haney Catchings, 66, American football coach (Prairie View A&M, Tuskegee), cancer.
- Uche Chukwumerije, 75, Nigerian politician, Senator for Abia North (since 2003), lung cancer.
- William Price Fox, 89, American novelist.
- Lothar Friedrich, 84, German cyclist.
- Eva Galambos, 87, American politician, Mayor of Sandy Springs, Georgia (2005–2014), cancer.
- Freddie Gray, 25, American police suspect, severed spinal cord.
- Margot Isaacs, Marchioness of Reading, 96, British aristocrat.
- Aliaskhab Kebekov, 43, Dagestani-Russian Islamist leader, Emir of the Caucasus Emirate (since 2014), shot.
- Ebenezer Laing, 83, Ghanaian botanist and geneticist.
- Sandra Mackey, 77, American journalist (Chicago Tribune, The Wall Street Journal).
- István Marton, 72, Hungarian politician.
- Roy Mason, Baron Mason of Barnsley, 91, British politician, MP for Barnsley (1953–1983) and Barnsley Central (1983–1987), Secretary of State for Northern Ireland (1976–1979).
- Scott Mason, 55, American radio personality.
- Tom McCabe, 60, Scottish politician, Minister for Finance and Public Service Reform (2004–2007).
- Tony Morelli, 58, Canadian stunt performer (The X-Files, Smallville, Rise of the Planet of the Apes).
- Hiroyuki Nishimoto, 88, Japanese voice actor (Moomin), aortic dissection.
- Theodosia Okoh, 92, Ghanaian flag designer and sports administrator.
- Michael J. D. Powell, 78, British mathematician.
- Else Repål, 85, Norwegian politician.
- Oktay Sinanoğlu, 80, Turkish scientist.
- Bernard Stollman, 85, American record label founder (ESP-Disk), colon and spine cancer.
- Elio Toaff, 99, Italian rabbi, Chief Rabbi of Rome (1951–2002).
- Betty Willis, 91, American graphic designer (Welcome to Fabulous Las Vegas sign).
- Casimir Witucki, 86, American football player (Washington Redskins).

=== 20 ===
- Gilberto Almeida, 86, Ecuadorian painter.
- Gary Brain, 72, New Zealand timpanist and conductor.
- Doug Buffone, 70, American football player (Chicago Bears) and radio host.
- Cláudio Cunha, 68, Brazilian actor.
- Hassan El-Shazly, 71, Egyptian footballer (Tersana, national team).
- Pedro Eugênio, 65, Brazilian politician, MP (1998–2014), complications from surgery.
- Peter Howell, 96, British actor (Emergency – Ward 10, Shadowlands, The Prisoner).
- Nobuo Kaiho, 73, Japanese Olympic basketball player.
- Albert Kalonji, 85, Congolese politician, King of South Kasai.
- Gábor Kucsera, 65, Hungarian Olympic swimmer.
- Aharon Lichtenstein, 81, French-born American-Israeli rabbi, recipient of the Israel Prize (2014).
- Bob Maloubier, 92, French secret agent.
- Pete Mills, 72, American football player (Buffalo Bills).
- Frederic Morton, 90, Austrian-born American writer.
- Eugene W. Peirce Jr., 84, American politician.
- Bob St. Clair, 84, American Hall of Fame football player (San Francisco 49ers).
- Ibrahim Yusri, 65, Egyptian actor (The Terrorist), kidney failure.

=== 21 ===
- M. H. Abrams, 102, American literary critic.
- Mykola Bahrov, 77, Ukrainian academician and politician.
- Steve Byrnes, 56, American sports announcer (NASCAR on Fox), head and neck cancer.
- Gideon Eilat, 91, Israeli soldier.
- Betsy von Furstenberg, 83, German-born American actress (As the World Turns) and baroness, Alzheimer's disease.
- Jerry Grisham, 73, American politician, cancer.
- Edan Milton Hughes, 80, American art dealer and author.
- Bakhtyar Khudojnazarov, 49, Tajik-Russian film director (Luna Papa).
- Ferenc Konrád, 70, Hungarian water polo player, Olympic bronze (1968), silver (1972) and gold (1976) medalist.
- Ellen Kort, 79, American poet.
- Jim McCarthy, 90, Irish rugby union player (national team).
- Sergey Mikhalyov, 67, Russian ice hockey coach, traffic collision.
- John Moshoeu, 49, South African footballer (Kaizer Chiefs, Giant Blackpool, national team), African Cup of Nations champion (1996), cancer.
- Janaki Ballabh Patnaik, 88, Indian politician, Chief Minister of Odisha (1980–1989, 1995–1999), Governor of Assam (2009–2014), heart attack.
- Robert P. Patterson Jr., 91, American federal judge.
- Borisav Pisić, 66, Bosnian Yugoslav Olympic hurdler (1980).
- Sydney Valpy Radley-Walters, 95, Canadian WWII tank commander.
- Abdel Rahman el-Abnudi, 76, Egyptian poet.
- Derek Vonberg, 93, British physicist. (death announced on this date)
- Dave Walker, 73, English footballer (Burnley, Southampton).
- Elizabeth Weaver, 74, American judge, Michigan Supreme Court Justice (1995–2010), Chief Justice (1991–2001).
- Ron Wright, 76, American professional wrestler.
- Cindy Yang, 24, Taiwanese model and actress (First of May), suicide by helium inhalation.

=== 22 ===
- Hugh Alan Anderson, 81, Canadian politician.
- Dick Balharry, 77, British conservationist, cancer.
- Peter B. Best, 76, British marine mammal expert.
- Dorothy Custer, 103, American comedian.
- Yoichi Funado, 71, Japanese novelist, thymic cancer.
- Régis Ghesquière, 65, Belgian Olympic decathlete (1972), heart attack.
- Alasdair Graham, 85, Canadian politician, Senator for Nova Scotia (1972–2004).
- Nagare Hagiwara, 62, Japanese actor, traffic collision.
- Imtiaz Alam Hanfi, 86, Pakistani banker.
- Ronny Lee, 88, American guitarist and writer.
- Audree Norton, 88, American actress.
- Bernard Penfold, 98, British army major general, general manager of the Royal Hong Kong Jockey Club (1972–1979).
- Aideen O'Kelly, 74, Irish actress.
- Páll Skúlason, 69, Icelandic philosopher.
- Gennadi Vengerov, 55, Belarusian-born Soviet actor (Enemy at the Gates), lung and bone cancer.
- Irene Woodall, 69, American magazine editor.

=== 23 ===
- Afzaal Ahmed, 66, Pakistani cricketer and umpire.
- Aziz Asli, 77, Iranian footballer (Persepolis).
- Dick Barone, 82, American baseball player (Pittsburgh Pirates).
- Desmond Boal, 85, Northern Irish lawyer and politician, MP for Belfast Shankill (1960–1972).
- Frana Cardno, 74, New Zealand politician, Mayor of Southland District (1992–2013), bile duct cancer.
- Sir Philip Carter, 87, British football director (Everton).
- Richard Corliss, 71, American film critic (Time), stroke.
- Alexander Eliot, 95, American writer.
- Marie Herbst, 86, American politician, Mayor of Vernon, Connecticut (1979–1986), member of the Connecticut Senate (1987–1992).
- George Horner, 91, Czech-born American pianist and physician.
- Ray Jackson, 74, Australian aboriginal activist and Wiradjuri elder.
- Pierre Claude Nolin, 64, Canadian politician, Speaker of the Senate (since 2014), pancreatic cancer.
- Frank Porretta, 84, American tenor and musical theater actor.
- Paul Ryan, 69, American actor, television host and correspondent (Entertainment Tonight), leukemia.
- Jim Steffen, 78, American football player (Detroit Lions, Washington Redskins).
- E. M. Subramaniam, 67, Indian Carnatic percussionist.
- Sawyer Sweeten, 19, American actor (Everybody Loves Raymond), suicide by gunshot.
- Francis Tsai, 48, American concept artist (Spider-Man, TMNT, The Bourne Conspiracy), amyotrophic lateral sclerosis.
- Sixto Valencia Burgos, 81, Mexican comic artist (Memín Pinguín, MAD).
- Guillermo Zúñiga Martínez, 72, Mexican academic and politician, Mayor of Xalapa (1988–1991), MP for Veracruz (1994–1997).

=== 24 ===
- Władysław Bartoszewski, 93, Polish politician and resistance fighter, Auschwitz concentration camp prisoner, Minister of Foreign Affairs (1995, 2000–2001).
- Ken Birch, 81, British footballer (Bangor City).
- Thomas Joseph Connolly, 92, American Roman Catholic prelate, Bishop of Baker (1971–1999).
- Theodore Curtis, 74, American politician.
- Rustum Ghazaleh, 61, Syrian military officer, head injury.
- Ismail Hussain, 65, Indian politician, MP for Barpeta (2009–2014), cancer.
- Horst-Peter Kretschmer, 59, German Olympic ice hockey player (1980, 1988).
- Valentine Lamb, 76, British journalist (The Irish Field).
- Frankie Lee, 73, American blues singer-songwriter.
- Benjamin F. Logan, 87, American electrical engineer and bluegrass musician, heart attack.
- Sabeen Mahmud, 39, Pakistani human rights activist, shot.
- Michael Mustill, Baron Mustill, 83, British judge, barrister and peer.
- Herbert Ninaus, 78, Austrian-born Australian international footballer.
- Claudia Paz, 95, Chilean actress.
- Max Rojas, 74, Mexican poet.
- Raymond Roussin, 75, Canadian Roman Catholic prelate, Bishop of Gravelbourg (1995–1998) and Victoria (1999–2004), Archbishop of Vancouver (2004–2009).
- Success Express, 30, American Thoroughbred racehorse.
- Sid Tepper, 96, American songwriter ("Red Roses for a Blue Lady").
- George C. Young, 98, American lawyer and judge, heart attack.

=== 25 ===
- Karl-Otto Alberty, 81, German actor.
- Colin Bloomfield, 33, British radio presenter (BBC Radio Derby), skin cancer.
- Sujit Bose, 80, Indian cricketer.
- Arthur Brittenden, 90, British newspaper editor (Daily Mail).
- Wilfred Brown, 85, Australian cricketer.
- Edward Coke, 7th Earl of Leicester, 78, British nobleman.
- Jim Fanning, 87, American baseball player (Chicago Cubs) and manager (Montreal Expos).
- Paolo Galletti, 78, Italian Olympic swimmer (1956, 1960).
- Jiří Hledík, 86, Czech footballer (FC Hradec Králové).
- Doug Kerslake, 65, Canadian ice hockey player (Edmonton Oilers).
- Otakar Krámský, 55, Czech racing driver, triple European hillclimb champion (1995, 1997, 1998), training collision.
- Don Mankiewicz, 93, American screenwriter (Star Trek, Ironside, Profiles in Courage), heart failure.
- Ben Molar, 99, Argentine composer and musical producer.
- Mike Phillips, 59, American basketball player (Kentucky Wildcats, FC Barcelona), fall.
- Alfred Schreyer, 92, Ukrainian-born Polish fiddler and singer.
- Christine Stewart, 74, Canadian politician, Secretary of State (1993–1997) and Minister of the Environment (1997–1999).
- Richard West, 84, British journalist and author.
- Notable deaths consequent to the April 2015 Nepal earthquake:
  - Dan Fredinburg, 33, American executive, head of privacy at Google.
  - Matthias Kuhle, 67, German geographer.

=== 26 ===
- John M. Alberts, 82, American politician.
- David Alt, 81, American geologist.
- Masudur Rahman Baidya, 46, Indian swimmer, heart attack.
- Talal Akbar Bugti, 63, Pakistani tribal leader and politician, heart attack.
- Edward T. Chambers, 85, American activist, director of the Industrial Areas Foundation (1972–2009), heart failure.
- Hojatollah Khatib, 61, Iranian sports administrator (Persepolis), cancer.
- Izatullo Khayoyev, 78, Tajik politician, vice-president (1990–1991), Prime Minister (1991–1992).
- Jayne Meadows, 95, American actress (I've Got a Secret, Undercurrent, Song of the Thin Man).
- Józef Paczyński, 95, Polish WWII prisoner, barber of Rudolf Hoss.
- Marcel Pronovost, 84, Canadian Hall of Fame ice hockey player (Detroit Red Wings, Toronto Maple Leafs).
- Bill Valentine, 82, American baseball umpire.
- Wang Guozhen, 58, Chinese poet, liver cancer.

=== 27 ===
- Jay Appleton, 95, British geographer.
- Jean Bengué, 72, Central African basketball player and politician.
- Randy Bennett, 51, Canadian swimming coach, cancer.
- Suzanne Crough, 52, American actress (The Partridge Family), arrhythmogenic right ventricular dysplasia.
- David Fletcher, 90, English cricketer (Surrey).
- Gene Fullmer, 83, American professional boxer, two-time middleweight world champion.
- Verne Gagne, 89, American professional wrestler, trainer and promoter (AWA), Hall of Fame (2004, 2006).
- Frank Henderson, 92, American politician, member of the Idaho House of Representatives (2004–2014).
- Guy LeBlanc, 54, Canadian keyboard player (Nathan Mahl, Camel), kidney cancer.
- Andrew Lesnie, 59, Australian cinematographer (The Lord of the Rings, Babe, I Am Legend), Oscar winner (2002), heart attack.
- Harvey R. Miller, 82, American lawyer, amyotrophic lateral sclerosis.
- Marty Napoleon, 93, American jazz pianist.
- Lionel Repka, 80, Canadian ice hockey player (Fort Wayne Komets), liver cancer.
- Alexander Rich, 90, American biologist.
- Inês Etienne Romeu, 72, Brazilian political prisoner.
- Abraham Rotstein, 86, Canadian economist.
- Rolf Smedvig, 62, American classical trumpeter (Empire Brass), heart attack.
- Chris Turner, 64, English football player and manager (Peterborough).
- John Wimpenny, 92, English aeronautical engineer.

=== 28 ===
- Antônio Abujamra, 82, Brazilian actor and director.
- Marcia Brown, 96, American writer and children's books illustrator.
- Duri Camichel, 32, Swiss ice hockey player (EV Zug), traffic collision.
- George Corrin, 92, American graphic designer.
- Glenn Dennis, 90, American ufologist.
- Jack Ely, 71, American singer ("Louie Louie").
- René Féret, 69, French actor and director (Solemn Communion).
- Ashura Hara, 68, Japanese professional wrestler, pneumonia.
- Keith Harris, 67, British ventriloquist (Orville the Duck), cancer.
- Michael J. Ingelido, 98, American Air Force major general, stroke.
- Ian Mackersey, 90, New Zealand filmmaker and author.
- Yoshihiko Osaki, 76, Japanese swimmer, Olympic silver medalist (1960), pneumonia.
- Vicente Piccio Jr., 83, Filipino Air Force major general.
- Einar Thorsteinn, 73, Icelandic architect.
- James Watson, 78, British novelist.
- Xu Guangxian, 94, Chinese chemist.

=== 29 ===
- Charles Benton, 84, American public digital media promoter, CEO of the Benton Foundation, cancer.
- Carlos Calderón Fajardo, 69, Peruvian journalist and novelist.
- Giovanni Canestri, 96, Italian Roman Catholic prelate, Archbishop of Cagliari (1984–1987) and Genoa (1987–1995).
- Georgette Délibrias, 90, French physicist
- Daniel During, 83, South African cricketer.
- Gopulu, 90, Indian cartoonist (Ananda Vikatan).
- Nicholas Gruner, 72, Canadian Roman Catholic priest, promoter of the message of Our Lady of Fatima, heart attack.
- John G. Heyburn II, 66, American federal judge, Chief District Court Judge for the Western District of Kentucky (2001–2008), liver cancer.
- Paul Hudak, 62, American professor of computer science, leukemia.
- Milap Chand Jain, 86, Indian judge and politician, Governor of Rajasthan (1990).
- Gary Liddell, 60, Scottish footballer (Grimsby Town, Heart of Midlothian).
- Valmir Louruz, 71, Brazilian football manager (Juventude, Pelotas).
- François Michelin, 88, French businessman, CEO of Michelin (1955–1999).
- Vardan Militosyan, 64, Armenian Olympic silver medallist weightlifter (1976).
- Wayne Minshew, 78, American sportswriter (Atlanta Braves).
- Saburo Nakao, 77–78, Japanese Olympic wrestler.
- Jean Nidetch, 91, American businesswoman, founder of Weight Watchers.
- Calvin Peete, 71, American golfer, Tournament Players champion (1985).
- Philip Perlman, 95, American businessman and actor (Cheers).
- Joe Pikula, 70, Canadian football player (Hamilton Tiger-Cats).
- Barbara Reynolds, 100, English scholar, lexicographer and translator.
- Brian Sedgemore, 78, British politician, fall.
- Dan Walker, 92, American politician, Governor of Illinois (1973–1977), heart failure.
- Notable convicted drug traffickers executed by Indonesian firing squad:
  - Andrew Chan, 31, Australian (Bali Nine)
  - Rodrigo Gularte, 42, Brazilian
  - Myuran Sukumaran, 34, Australian (Bali Nine)

=== 30 ===
- Lennart Bodström, 87, Swedish politician, Minister for Foreign Affairs (1982–1985).
- Sharon Callahan, 63, American Olympic athlete.
- Bold Pilot, 22, Turkish thoroughbred racehorse.
- Halina Daniec, 66, Polish Olympic gymnast.
- Peter Dobkin Hall, 69, American author and historian, traffic collision.
- David Fonseca, 60, Belizean politician, Mayor of Belize City (1999–2006), suicide by gunshot.
- Adrian Gibson, 79, Australian politician, MP for Denison (1964–69).
- Steven Goldmann, 53, Canadian music video and film director, cancer.
- Rutger Gunnarsson, 69, Swedish bassist (ABBA, Elton John).
- Ben E. King, 76, American soul and R&B singer ("Stand by Me"), coronary heart disease.
- Armond Lebowitz, 88, American film editor (Q, The Incident, The Ambulance).
- Gregory Mertens, 24, Belgian footballer, heart attack.
- Patachou, 96, French singer and actress.
- William Pfaff, 86, American author and columnist, heart attack.
- Ronald Senator, 89, British composer, house fire.
- Sky Classic, 28, Canadian Thoroughbred racehorse.
- Nigel Terry, 69, British actor (The Lion in Winter, Excalibur, Troy), emphysema.
