= Eduardo Gauggel =

Eduardo Gauggel might refer to:

- Eduardo Gauggel Rivas, Honduran lawyer and politician, father
- Eduardo Gauggel Medina, Honduran lawyer and politician, son
