= Genuity =

Genuity may refer to:

- Canaccord Genuity, Canadian financial company
- Genuity (Monsanto brand), a brand of genetically modified products from Monsanto
- Genuity (Internet company), an internet business owned by Level 3 Communications

== See also ==
- Genuity Championship
