= John Murrell (chemist) =

British theoretical chemist (1932–2016)

John Murrell FRS
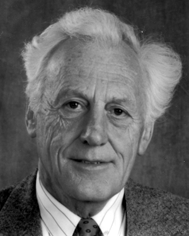
- John Norman Murrell
- Born: 2 March 1932; Brixton, England
- Died: 25 January 2016 (aged 83); North Chailey, England
- Education: King's College London
- Known for: Understanding of spectra; Theory of intermolecular forces; Construction of potential energy surfaces
- Spouse: (Dorothy) Shirley Read
- Scientific career
- Fields: Theoretical chemistry
- Workplaces: University of Cambridge; University of Chicago; University of Sheffield; Tallahassee, Florida; University of Sussex

John Norman Murrell FRS (2 March 1932 – 25 January 2016) was a British theoretical chemist who played a leading role in revolutionising the UK's reputation for theoretical chemistry during the second half of the 20th century.

== Biography ==
Murrell was born in Brixton on 2 March 1932. His father, George Victor Murrell, was a salesman and bakery manager, and his mother was Winifred Edith née Walker.

At the start of WWII, the family moved to Reigate, where Murrell attended Reigate Grammar School from 1943. In 1950 he was offered a place at King's College London (KCL) to study chemistry. He gained a BSc with First Class Honours in 1953. He then started a Ph.D. in physics at KCL with Professor Christopher Longuet-Higgins, who soon afterward, was appointed to the Chair of Theoretical Chemistry at the University of Cambridge. Murrell joined him as a graduate student at Corpus Christi College, Cambridge, and completed his Ph.D. in 1956.

Murrell won a Commonwealth Fund Fellowship to work in Robert S. Mulliken's group at the University of Chicago. He published an influential paper on molecular charge transfer in donor–acceptor pairs. In September 1957, he returned to Corpus Christi and branched out into applications of molecular orbital theory, collaborating variously with Edgar Heilbronner, visiting from Zürich, Alan R. Katritzky, and Norman Sheppard.

In 1960 Murrell was enticed to the University of Sheffield by George Porter. He worked hard to set up his research group and, by the start of his second year at Sheffield, had five Ph.D. students and two postdoctoral associates. During his time at Sheffield, Murrell had two sabbaticals: one at Tallahassee, Florida and the other in Paris with Heilbronner. He was awarded the Chemical Society's Meldola Medal and a John Jaffe Research Fellowship of the Royal Society during this period. He was elected a fellow of the Royal Society in 1991.

Later that decade, Murrell was appointed to the new chair of Theoretical Chemistry at Sussex. He moved there in 1965. Two years later, he was instrumental in the appointment of Harry Kroto, whom he had known at Sheffield, to a lectureship in chemical physics. Murrell retired to become an emeritus professor in 1997; he "maintained an active interest in chemistry regularly working in the University and helping students until a few months before his death."

The John Murrell Fund was set up upon his death in 2016 to support Sussex Chemistry Ph.D. students facing financial difficulties.

=== Family ===
Murrell met (Dorothy) Shirley Read at a dance while both were undergraduates; Shirley was studying medicine. They married in Farnborough in 1954. In the 1960s, they had two sons and two daughters, all born in different places: Catharine (Cambridge), Luke (Sheffield), Ruth (Florida), and Adrian John (Sussex).

Shirley forged her career during all of the family moves. She was, for example, a house officer in Wisbech and held a position in the radiotherapy department at Addenbrooke's Hospital. A major achievement was to establish the Martlets hospice in the Brighton area. She retired at 65.

John Murrell died of glioma at St Peter and St James Hospice in North Chailey, East Sussex, on 25 January 2016. He was survived by his wife and their four children.

== Books ==
- 1963 The theory of the electronic spectra of organic molecules. Chapman and Hall, London
- 1965 (With S. F. A. Kettle and J. M. Tedder) Valence theory. John Wiley & Sons, London
- 1972 (With A. J. Harget) Semi-empirical self-consistent-field molecular orbital theory of molecules. Wiley Interscience, London
- 1978 Chemical bond. Wiley-Blackwell
- 1982 (With E. A. Boucher) Properties of Liquids and Solutions. Wiley-Blackwell
- 1984 (With S. Carter, S. C. Farantos, P. Huxley and A. J. C. Varandas) Molecular potential energy functions. John Wiley & Sons, Chichester
- 1989 (With S. Bosanac) Introduction to the theory of atomic and molecular collisions. John Wiley & Sons, Chichester.
