= Quattrocchi =

Quattrocchi (or Quatrocchi) is an Italian surname. Notable people with the surname include:

- Andrea Quattrocchi (born 1989), Paraguayan actress and ballerina
- Fabrizio Quattrocchi (1968–2004), Italian terrorism victim
- Luigi Beltrame Quattrocchi (1880–1951), Italian Catholic layman
- Ottavio Quattrocchi (1938–2013), Italian businessman
- Pablo Quatrocchi (born 1974), Argentine football player and coach
- Robert Quattrocchi, American politician
- Rocco Quattrocchi (1927–2015), American politician

== See also ==
- Suzy Quatro
