= Peter Best =

Peter Best may refer to:

- Pete Best (born 1941), original drummer for the Beatles
- Peter Best (composer) (born 1943), Australian film composer
- Peter B. Best (1939–2015), British marine mammalogist
