= Titi Kwan =

Hong Kong fashion designer

Titi Kwan is a Hong Kong born, Paris-based fashion designer and wardrobe stylist. From the mid-1990s he worked closely with Chinese singer/actress Faye Wong as her stylist before moving to Paris to become a full-time designer in the early 2010s.

== Early life and education ==
Titi Kwan's father was a tailor who worked from home, specialising in traditional Chinese garments. Aged 15, he moved to Paris to stay with his sister, where he was able to express his individual sense of style without feeling out of place. At the age of 18, Kwan enrolled in the Studio Berçot in Paris, where he learned about the history of fashion, and developed his sewing, cutting and design skills under the eye of Marie Rucki. He worked as a waiter to pay his tuition fees, and also found additional work as a stylist, eventually leaving the Studio in order to focus full-time on this.

== As stylist ==
During a trip back home to Hong Kong in the mid-1990s, Kwan met singer Faye Wong whilst looking for a performer to feature in a fashion magazine. This was the beginning of a long-running partnership between Wong and her new stylist, Kwan, who from that point on worked almost exclusively for her until she took a career break in 2004. Wong's first outfit was a Versace dress and flip-flops, whose modernity came as a surprise to many of her fans who were used to conservative, late 1980s styles. Wong and Kwan also looked at clothes by up-and-coming avant-garde designers such as Dries Van Noten and Martin Margiela. Whilst working with Kwan, Faye Wong became known as the "Madonna of the East".

Though described as a fashion visionary and an "uber stylist", Kwan maintained an inscrutable, low-key personal profile, allowing his work to represent him. He has been compared to fellow celebrity stylists Nicola Formichetti and Rachel Zoe, and called "Asia's most infamous stylist".

== Fashion designer ==
Faye Wong's four-year career break in 2004 enabled Kwan to pursue fashion design, and develop his vision. In 2008, he presented his first collection at the Hyères fashion festival, where it was shortlisted. The collection was taken up by Maria Luisa Poumaillou, who sold it through her Paris boutique. Despite this early success, Kwan chose not to design again until 2011, when he felt more confident about his skills. His label, which is titled Alibellus+, is divided into three separate ranges - separates and casual wear, a line of dresses with handmade finishing and detail, and unique pieces made from vintage textiles.

Kwan's designs, which start with draping fabric on a form before sketching or devising a pattern, combine bias cutting and draping with folding techniques to create garments designed for movement and comfort. He cites the 1920s-30s designer Madeleine Vionnet, renowned for her bias cutting techniques and precision of finish, as an important influence on his work. The work of the photographer Richard Avedon and filmmakers Wim Wenders and Jim Jarmusch are also sources of inspiration.

Kwan has collaborated with Christophe Lemaire of Hermès and Martine Sitbon. He also continues to work closely with Faye Wong, creating costumes for her 2011 world tour, including a goddess gown made from a single piece of fabric, and a dramatically flowing gown using over 100 metres of layered chiffon.
