= Wilfred Brown =

Wilfred Brown may refer to:

- Wilfred Brown (tenor) (1921–1971), English tenor
- Wilfred Brown, Baron Brown (1908–1985), British businessman and politician
- Wilfred Brown (cricketer) (1930–2015), Australian cricketer
- Wilfred George Brown (1906–1970), commissioner of Yukon
