= Jaime Delgado Aparicio =

Peruvian jazz pianist

Jaime Delgado Aparicio (1943 – March 28, 1983) was a Peruvian jazz pianist, arranger, and conductor.

== Career ==
He was born in Lima, Peru in 1943. He is the younger brother of lawyer and politician Luis Delgado Aparicio. He began studying piano and classical music when he was five years old. He studied at Berklee College of Music in Boston. He recorded three albums in the 1960s and performed modern jazz concerts throughout Peru into the 1980s. As music director for the record label Sono Radio, he signed the rock band Black Sugar.

== Discography ==
- Jazz (Sono Radio, 1964)
- Jam Session Vol. 1 (Virrey, 1965)
- El Embajador Y Yo (Decibel, 1968)
- Jaime Delgado Aparicio y Su Orquesta Contemporanea (Sono Radio, 1976)
