= List of think tanks in Nepal =

The following is a list of notable Nepali think tanks Many of these are headquartered at its capital Kathmandu and range from government aided organisations to privately funded ones.

| Name | Specialization | Funding Type | City (Location) | Notes |
|---|---|---|---|---|
| Policy Research Institute (PRI) | Public Policy | Government | Kathmandu, (Narayanhiti) | |
| Institute of Foreign Affairs (IFA) | politics, Foreign Affairs | Not-for-profit | Kathmandu (Tripureshwor) | |
| International Centre for Integrated Mountain Development (ICIMOD) | Environment, Mountain | Intergovernmental organisation | Lalitpur (Khumaltar) | |
| Nepal Development Research Institute (NDRI) | Public Policy | Not-for-profit | Lalitpur (Sanepa) | |
| Institute for Integrated Development Studies (IIDS) | Sustainable Development | Not-for-profit | Kathmandu (Mandikatar) | |
| Nepal Policy Institute (NPI) | Public Policy, Sustainable Development | Not-for-profit | Kathmandu (Gyaneshwor) | |
| Nepal Institute for International Cooperation and Engagement (NIICE) | Freedom, Democracy | Not-for-profit | Lalitpur (Hattiban) | |
| Nepal Economic Forum (NEC) | Economy | Not-for-profit | Lalitpur (Krishna Galli) | |
| Samriddhi Foundation | | Not-for-profit | Kathmandu | |
| Forest Resources Studies and Action Team (FRSAT) | Forest | Not-for-profit | Lalitpur, Nepal (Bagdol) | |
| Institute for Social and Environmental Transition (ISET-Nepal) | Climate Change, Water Governance, Disaster Risk Reduction, Biodiversity, Environment | Not-for-profit | Kathmandu (Sundhara) | |
| Nepal Centre for Contemporary Research (NCCR) | Public Policy | Not-for-profit | Kathmandu (Koteshwor) | |
| Nepal Institute for Policy Research (NiPoRe) | Public Policy | Not-for-profit | Lalitpur | |

== See also ==
- List of think tanks
