= Renate Wieland =

German philosopher, music pedagogue and musicologist

Renate Wieland (24 July 1935 – 5 May 2017) was a German philosopher, music pedagogue and musicologist.

== Life ==
Wieland lived in Kronberg im Taunus and was a member of the Kronberg Academy.

She studied music, German language and literature and philosophy with Ernst Bloch und Adorno. From 1970 to 1977 she was an assistant to Hermann Schweppenhäuser at the philosophical faculty of the Leuphana University of Lüneburg and received her doctorate in Frankfurt am Main in 1978. She also gave piano lessons in Kronberg.

Her urn was buried at the Kronberg cemetery Thalerfeld.

== Selected publications ==
- Zur Dialektik des ästhetischen Scheins. Vergleichende Studien zu Hegels Phänomenologie des Geistes, der Ästhetik und Goethes Faust II. [= Bd. 203 von Monographien zur philosophischen Forschung] Forum Academicum, Königstein/Ts 1981.
- with Jürgen Uhde: Denken und Spielen. Studien zu einer Theorie der musikalischen Darstellung. Bärenreiter, Kassel; New York 1988.
- Schein, Kritik, Utopie. Zu Goethe und Hegel. Edition Text + critik, Munich 1992.
- With Jürgen Uhde: Forschendes Üben. Wege instrumentalen Lernens. über den Interpreten und den Körper als Instrument der Musik. Bärenreiter, Kassel; New York 2002.
- with Jürgen Uhde: Schubert. Späte Klaviermusik. Spuren ihrer inneren Geschichte. Bärenreiter, Kassel 2013
