= Paul D. Reynolds =

- Born: March 26, 1963; British Columbia
- Died: April 1, 2015 (aged 52); Kona, Hawaii
- Occupation: Canadian investment banker
- Employer: Canaccord Genuity Group Inc.
- Title: Chief Executive
- Children: four

Paul D. Reynolds (March 26, 1963 – April 1, 2015) was a Canadian investment banker at Canaccord Genuity Group Inc. He rose through the ranks to CEO, leading the brokerage to become one of Canada's largest global investment firms.

== Early life and education ==
Reynolds was the eldest of 6 children born to John Reynolds, former Conservative member of Parliament, and his wife in British Columbia.

== Career ==
Reynolds started working at the former Vancouver Stock Exchange. He joined the Canadian brokerage firm Canaccord Genuity Group Inc. in 1985 as a retail broker and investment adviser. He changed to investment banking, financing emerging tech companies and "rose through the ranks".

In 1999, he was appointed Canaccord president and led European operations from London until 2006. In 2007, he became CEO of Canaccord. Under Reynolds' leadership, the company expanded its presence into 10 countries and grew through major acquisitions like Genuity and in 2012, Britain-based brokerage Collins Stewart.

In a 2013 interview Reynolds said "It’s a cliche, but if you always put your clients’ interests first, you’ll be successful. That applies to any career."

Reynolds had been appointed to the prestigious International Crisis Group Board of Trustees.

== Death ==
Reynolds was married and had four children. After his two youngest children were born, he adopted a much more athletic lifestyle. On March 29, 2015 Reynolds participated in the Lavaman Waikoloa triathlon on the island of Hawaii. During the 1,500-metre swim Reynolds went underwater. He was rescued and given CPR, but died in hospital a few days later. He was 52 years old.
