= Jürgen Uhde =

German musicologist, pianist, university lecturer and piano teacher

Jürgen Uhde (24 September 1913 in Hamburg – 1 September 1991 in Bad Soden am Taunus) was a German musicologist, pianist, university lecturer and piano teacher at the State University of Music and Performing Arts Stuttgart.

== Principal students ==
- Gerhard Eckle
- Helmut Lachenmann
- Dieter Weber
- Michael Wendeberg

== Selected publications ==
- Der Dienst der Musik (Vortrag, gehalten in der Stuttgarter „Privatstudiengesellschaft“ im November 1949). Zollion-Zürich 1950 (= Theologische Studien. Eine Schriftenreihe, hg. von Karl Barth, 30)
- Bartók, Mikrokosmos: Spielanweisungen und Erläuterungen. Eine Einführung in das Werk und seine pädagogischen Absichten. Zur Neubewertung von Béla Bartóks Mikrokosmos. Gustav Bosse Verlag, Regensburg, 1952, ISBN 3-764-92333-4; 2nd edition 1988.
- Béla Bartók. Kolloquium Verlag, Berlin, 1959 (Köpfe des XX. Jahrhunderts, 11).
- Prisma der gegenwärtigen Musik. Tendenzen und Probleme des zeitgenössischen Schaffens, published by Joachim Ernst Berendt and Jürgen Uhde. Furche, Hamburg 1959
- Beethovens Klaviermusik. 3 volumes. Reclam-Verlag, Stuttgart, 1968–1974 (und öfter), ISBN 3-15-018958-6.
- Denken und Spielen. Studien zu einer Theorie der musikalischen Darstellung [together with Renate Wieland]. Bärenreiter-Verlag, Kassel, 1988 (2nd edition 1990).
- Forschendes Üben. Wege instrumentalen Lernens [together with Renate Wieland]. Bärenreiter-Verlag, Kassel, 2002.
