= National Wood Carvers Association =

United States association of woodcarvers

The National Wood Carvers Association is best known for its publication, the magazine Chip Chats. The organization, founded in 1953 by Stephen LePage, is headquartered in Cincinnati, Ohio. It is the largest national association of woodcarvers, with a magazine membership of over 13,000 subscribers, compared with 19 when the magazine was first published. The longest-serving president of the NWCA was Edward Gallenstein, who was first elected in 1971. The current president is Bill Staley.
