= Bhola Nath Chalise =

- Died: April 15, 2015
- Education: University of Vienna
- Occupations: Economist, government official, libertarian activist
- Organization: Samriddhi Foundation

Bhola Nath Chalise (died 2015) was a Nepalese economist and government official who played a leading role in turning Nepal's largely statist economy into a more free market economy. He spent many years as an official at the Ministry of Industry, serving in turn as under-secretary, Joint Secretary, and Secretary.

Upon his death, he was described as one of Nepal's “great champions of freedom and economic reform” and as having successfully struggled against what had been the perceived view in Nepal that the “state is omnipotent.” For decades, commented one source, Chalise “was one of the very few advocates of [the] free market in Nepal’s mainstream media.” Another source has said that Chalise, during his years at Nepal's Industry Ministry, “played a crucial role” in introducing “market friendly reform policies and acts.”

== Early life and education ==
One source states that he was born at Subigaun in Bouddha, Kathmandu, in 1951; another, that he was born in the village of Simaltar at the northeastern end of the Kathmandu valley in 1952.

He joined Nepal’s civil service in 1975, working at the Ministry of Industry, and from 1983 to 1986 studied at the University of Vienna, receiving a doctorate in economics.

== Career ==
After returning to Nepal from Vienna, Chalise resumed working at the Ministry of Industry. He spent a total of 23 years in government service, including 20 years in the Ministry of Industry.

Chalise played a major role in formulating the Industrial Enterprises Act of 1987, the Industrial Enterprises Act of 1992, the Foreign Investment and Technology Transfer Act of 1992, and the Company Act of 1997, all of which were credited with helping advance economic liberalization and, in turn, economic growth in Nepal. He was also active in privatizing certain public enterprises and in decreasing the corporate tax rate.

During his career in the Ministry of Industry, Chalise served in turn as Undersecretary, Joint Secretary, and finally Secretary.

He quit the civil service after being appointed to the National Planning Commission (NPC) in 1999, a position he held for a year. He then served for a year as managing director of the Nepal Electricity Authority (NEA), and thereafter spent about three years as chairman of Rastriya Banijya Bank (RBB).

After retiring from government, Chalise wrote extensively about privatization, national planning, economic policy reform, and related subjects. From 2008 to his death, he held the position of Senior Advisor at Samriddhi Foundation, a libertarian think tank. In 2013, Samriddhi published Foreign Direct Investment: Toward Second Generation of Reforms, written by Chalise in collaboration with Akash Shrestha, Pramod Rijal, and Vivek Nath Pyakuryal.

Hayek translation

Chalise wrote the introduction of the Nepali translation of The Road to Serfdom by Friedrich Hayek.

== Death ==
He died on April 15, 2015, due to kidney-related ailments at Nepal Medical College, Jorpati in Kathmandu.

== Honors and awards ==
In January 2015 Chalise was named the year's Freedom Champion at the third Asia Liberty Forum (ALF), which was held in Kathmandu by Samriddhi Foundation, and the Asia Center for Enterprise. He was recognized for his efforts to promote individual and economic freedom in Nepal and, in particular, for his role in “formulating sound economic policies” while serving in Nepal's Ministry of Industry. In his closing address, Chalise “highlighted some of the major challenges to promoting liberalism in Asia.” He stated, “Never before has private entrepreneurship and wealth creation caught the imagination of billions as it has done in Asia today. Our job to promote freedom is filled with opportunities, and so many of you present today are the beacons of hope.”

== Personal life ==
Chalise had a wife and four sons. He was remembered after his death by Samriddhi as an “extremely humble and open-minded individual” who “led a principled life that was based on values such as honesty, integrity, freedom and responsibility.”
