= Joe Hutter =

American politician (1937–2015)

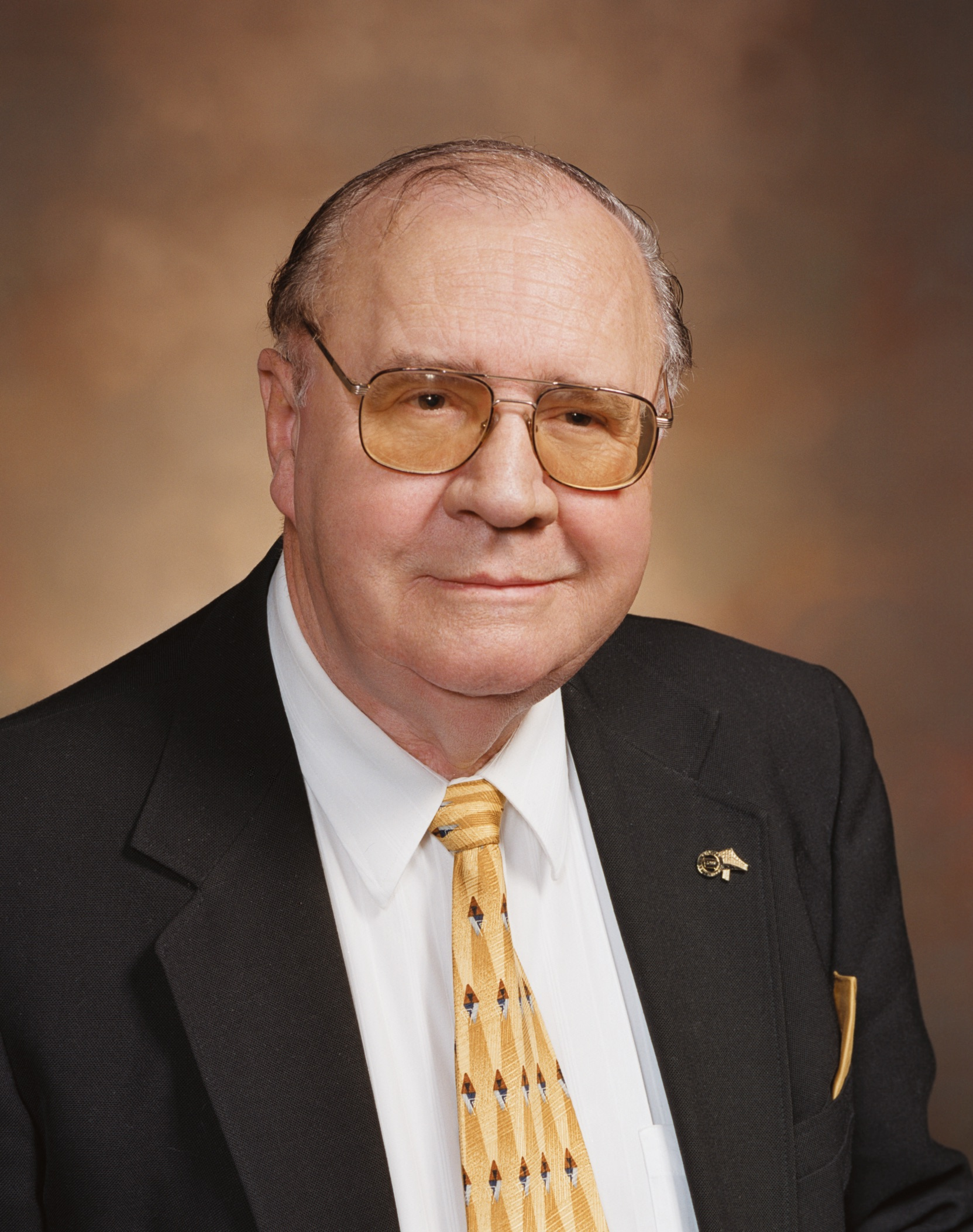

Member of the Iowa House of Representatives from the 82nd district
- In office 2003–2007
- Preceded by: Donna Barry
- Succeeded by: Linda Miller

Personal details
- Born: August 31, 1937 Dubuque, Iowa, U.S.
- Died: April 18, 2015 (aged 77) Genesis Medical Center, Davenport, Iowa, U.S.
- Party: Republican
- Spouse: Barbara O. Roberts (m. 1965; died 2003)
- Occupation: police officer

Joseph I. Hutter (August 31, 1937 – April 18, 2015) was an American politician who was a member of the Iowa House of Representatives from 2003 to 2007. He represented the 82nd district.

He was born in Dubuque, Iowa, to Irvin and Marie Hutter (née Ryan). He served in the United States Navy from 1956 to 1958, then moved to Bettendorf, where he worked as a police officer until he retired in 1994. Hutter was appointed to the board of Hawk-i, on which he served until his death in 2015.
