= Enough Praying =

- film poster and DVD cover
- Directed by: Aldo Francia
- Starring: Marcelo Romo; Tennyson Ferrada
- Release date: 9 May 1973 (CFF)
- Running time: 1h 20min
- Country: Chile
- Language: Spanish

Enough Praying (Spanish: Ya no basta con rezar) is a 1973 Chilean drama film directed by Aldo Francia.

The film tells the story of a priest facing poverty and social disorders that occurred during the presidency of Eduardo Frei Montalva. The protagonist, Father Jaime (The Priest), must constantly struggle between his obedience to the hierarchy of the Church and his desire to take a more active role in the workers' revolution that is being planned in the port of Valparaíso in 1967.

The promotional poster for the film was quite controversial at the time since it portrays a priest holding his left hand and about to throw a stone with the other hand, with the apparent intent of instigating a violent rebellion. The context of the film's release was within a period of rapidly increasing political polarization and economic instability in Chile, with some fears of a potential breakout of civil war and the collapse of civil society. Given the film's portrayal of the struggles of the working class, it was part of a long list of media that was heavily censored by the military dictatorship after the 1973 Chilean coup d'etat. Today the protagonist's pose is reflected in reproductions of the poster in different stencils and street graffiti across Santiago.

== Plot ==
The film narrates the story of a priest who confronts poverty and social disorder during the government of Eduardo Frei Montalva. The central character, Father Jaime, struggles with balancing his allegiance to the Church hierarchy and his desire to take a more active role in the planned worker's revolution in the port of Valparaiso in 1967.

The promotional poster of the film created a stir due to its depiction of a priest wielding a stone in his right hand, while holding his left hand up in a gesture of defiance. Even today, the poster is reproduced in stencils and street art in Santiago.

== Cast ==
- Marcelo Romo - El Sacerdote (The Priest)
- Tennyson Ferrada - Justo
- Leonardo Perucci - Gabriel
- Roberto Navarrete -
- Claudia Paz - La mujer (The woman)
- Rubén Sotoconil - El trabajador (The worker)
