= Jean Bengué =

Central African basketball player

Member of Savigny-sur-Braye Municipal Council
- In office 2008–2015

Minister of Information
- In office 1988–1990
- President: Andre Kolingba
- Preceded by: David Nguindo
- Succeeded by: Tony Da Silva

Minister of Youth and Sport
- In office 1980–1985
- President: David Dacko; Andre Kolingba

Personal details
- Born: 12 November 1942 Bangui, Ubangi-Shari (now the Central African Republic)
- Died: 27 April 2015 (aged 72) Blois, France
- Spouse: Claudine
- Occupation: Basketball player Politician
- Basketball career

Career information
- High school: Lycée Racan
- College: Center for Resources, expertise and Sports Performance

Career history
- Hit Trésor SC
- Bas-Oubangui Fauves
- Red Star Dongo club
Medals
Event	1st	2nd	3rd
FIBA Africa Championship	1	0
Total	1	0	0
Men's basketball
Representing Central African Republic
FIBA Africa Championship
Gold medal – first place	1974 Central African Republic	

Jean-Jacques Bengué (12 November 1942 - 27 April 2015) was a Central African basketball player and politician. He was the Central African Republic men's national basketball team's captain in 1974.

== Early life and education ==
Born in Bangui on 12 November 1942, Bengué moved to France in the unknown year for studies. He was enrolled in Lycée Racan in Château-du-Loir. Upon finishing high school, he continued his higher education at the Center for Resources, expertise, and Sports Performance (CREPS) Training Centers in Saint-Raphaël and Reims and earned a master's degree as well as CAPES teaching certification.

== Career ==
In 1967, Bengué and his wife moved to the Central African Republic, where he played basketball. He played for Hit Trésor SC, Bas-Oubangui Fauves, and Red Star Dongo club. Furthermore, he also represented the Central African Republic in the FIBA Africa Championship 1974 as a captain and the team became the champion. When the national team returned to Bangui, he presented the 1974 FIBA Africa Championship trophy to Jean-Bédel Bokassa. As the Central African Republic qualified for the 1974 FIBA World Championship, he also included in the team squad and played in the tournament matches. Apart from that, he coached Central African woman basketball player Suzanne Deta.

Bengué was appointed as the Minister of Youth and Sport in 1980, a position that he served until 1985. Kolingba designated Bengué as Minister of Information from 1988 to 1990. Afterward, he immigrated to Perche Vendômois and was naturalized as a French citizen in 1994. In France, he founded and developed gymnastics programs.

In 2008, Bengué was elected as a Member of the Savigny-sur-Braye Municipal Council. While serving as councilor, he was also served as the president of the badminton club and founded the Association of Former International Basketball Players of Central Africa (AA.Inter.BACA) in January 2015.

== Death and personal life ==
Bengué died on 27 April 2015 in Blois. His funeral was held on 2 May 2015 in Savigny-sur-Braye church.

Bengué was married to Claudine in 1966. The couple had children.
