= Janet Turner (designer) =

Architect

Janet Turner (29 September 1936 – 7 April 2015) was a British architectural lighting designer and author. She was a fellow of the RSA and the Chartered Society of Designers, and an honorary fellow of the Society of Light and Lighting and the Royal Incorporation of Architects in Scotland (RIAS)." In 2014, RIAS gave her a lifetime achievement award “for her services to international lighting design and improving places for people.” Turner wrote books and lectured internationally on lighting design.

== Life ==
Janet Turner was born on 29 September 1936 in Dudley, West Midlands. She was the only child of a single mother, who worked as a seamstress. Encouraged by her stepfather, she attended Dudley art school. She was a British architectural lighting designer and author. She trained initially as an interior designer. Turner was a director of lighting company Concord Lighting. Projects she worked on included the NatWest Media Centre at Lord's cricket ground in London and Peckham Library, both of which earned the RIBA Stirling Prize, and the lighting redesign of Buckingham Palace. The Guardian called her "internationally acclaimed as the doyenne of lighting design".

According to the Architects' Journal, she was "A fellow of the RSA and the Chartered Society of Designers, Janet was also an honorary fellow of the Society of Light and Lighting and the Royal Incorporation of Architects in Scotland (RIAS)." In 2014, RIAS gave her a lifetime achievement award “for her services to international lighting design and improving places for people.”

She wrote four books and lectured internationally on lighting design.

Turner died on 7 April 2015 aged 78. She was married with two children.
