= Claudia Paz =

Chilean actress (1920–2015)

- Born: Vidia Arredondo Barra; 1920
- Died: 24 April 2015 (aged 95); Santiago, Chile
- Occupation: Actress
- Years active: 1967-2013

Vidia Arredondo Barra (1920 – April 24, 2015), better known by her pseudonym Claudia Paz, was a Chilean actress.

She studied at the University of Chile and participated in the Experimental Theater. Since 1980, she frequently appeared in commercials and soap operas.

== Filmography ==
=== Films ===
- El tango del viudo (1967)
- ya no basta con rezar (1973)
- Hasta en las mejores familias (1994)
- La virtud de la familia (2013)

=== Television ===
- La Madrastra (1981)
- Bienvenido Hermano Andes (1982)
- Marta a las Ocho (1985)
- Morir de amor (1985)
- Bellas y audaces (1988)
- Semidiós (1988)
- La intrusa (1989)
- Villa Nápoli (1991)
- Sucupira (1996)
- Eclipse de luna (1997)
- El día menos pensado (2006)
- El diario secreto de una profesional (2012)
