= Boonkua Lourvanij =

Thai businessman

Personal information
- Born: 9 August 1930 Bangkok, Thailand
- Died: 7 April 2015 (aged 84)

Sport
- Sport: Sports shooting

Boonkua Lourvanij (9 August 1930 – 7 April 2015) was a Thai businessman and sports shooter. He competed at the 1968 Summer Olympics and the 1972 Summer Olympics, was a founding member of the Skeet & Trap Shooting Association of Thailand, and founded and was CEO of the Asoke Motors Company.
