= Joe Pikula =

Canadian football player

Profile
- Position: Tackle

Personal information
- Born: May 5, 1944; Brantford, Ontario, Canada
- Died: April 29, 2015 (aged 70); Brantford, Ontario, Canada
- Listed height: 6 ft 3 in (1.91 m)
- Listed weight: 235 lb (107 kg)

Career history
- 1963–1964: Hamilton Tiger-Cats

Awards and highlights
- Grey Cup champion (1963)

Joseph Adam Pikula, Sr. (May 5, 1944 – April 29, 2015) was a Canadian professional football player who played for the Hamilton Tiger-Cats. He won the Grey Cup with them in 1963. He played high school football at the St. John's College in Brantford, Ontario and was the third player to go from playing high school football directly to the CFL. A back injury forced his retirement from football in 1964. He is a member of the Wayne Gretzky Sports Centre Hall of Recognition (1984).

Pikula died on April 29, 2015, in Brantford, Ontario, from cancer.
