= Johnny Gardiner =

American gridiron football player (1922–2015)

Profile
- Position: Quarterback

Personal information
- Born: December 22, 1922; Minneapolis, Minnesota, U.S.
- Died: April 1, 2015 (aged 92); Petaluma, California, U.S.
- Listed height: 5 ft 8 in (1.73 m)
- Listed weight: 176 lb (80 kg)

Career information
- College: Montana State

Career history
- 1949: Winnipeg Blue Bombers

John Warren Gardiner (December 22, 1922 – April 1, 2015) was an American professional football player who played for the Winnipeg Blue Bombers. He first played college football at the University of Minnesota before enlisting in the United States Army during World War II. He then enrolled at Purdue University and later transferred to Montana State University.
