= Józef Paczyński =

- Born: 20 January 1920; Łękawica
- Died: 26 April 2015 (aged 95); Kraków
- Burial place: Rakowicki Cemetery
- Occupations: barber, mechanical engineer, teacher

Józef Paczyński (29 January 1920 – 26 April 2015) was a Polish man who was known for having been the personal barber of Rudolf Höss during the time he spent as a prisoner in the Auschwitz concentration camp.

== Biography ==
At the age of 19, Paczyński was captured by the Nazis when trying to cross into Slovakia to join Polish freedom fighters in France. In June 1940, he was transported to Auschwitz, where he was assigned prisoner number 121. At the camp, he was assigned to work in a barbershop. One day, Höss visited the shop and chose Paczyński to come to Höss's home at the edge of the camp to cut his hair. Paczyński continued to cut Höss's hair weekly for nearly four years, during which time Höss never spoke to him. He has said that although he could have used his tools to slit Höss's throat during this time, he did not, because he and many others would have been killed as a consequence.

He was moved from Auschwitz to Loslau on 18 January 1945, making him one of the longest-surviving prisoners in the camp. After being moved, he was later liberated by American troops in Germany. After the war, he became a mechanical engineer and teacher. In 2001, he received the Commander's Cross of the Order of Polonia Restituta (English: Order of Rebirth of Poland). He was also awarded the Cross of the Order of Merit of the Federal Republic of Germany.

Paczyński died on 26 April 2015, at the age of 95. He was buried in the Rakowicki Cemetery, Kraków.
