= Ellen Kort =

American poet

Ellen Kort (1936 – April 21, 2015) was an American poet, named the first Poet Laureate of Wisconsin in 2000 by Governor Tommy Thompson. She held the position until 2004.

== Biography ==
Ellen Kort was born in 1936 in Glenwood City, Wisconsin, and grew up in Menomonie, Wisconsin. She loved writing poems since elementary school, and she was known as a "godmother of Wisconsin poetry". She was also Wisconsin's first Poet Laureate, serving from 2000 to 2004. She not only was a poet, but she was also a teacher, speaker, and workshop facilitator. She taught at a public charter high school, in Appleton, Wisconsin, as a poetry teacher at Renaissance School for the Arts. She also taught at the University of Wisconsin–Green Bay, the Oklahoma Art Institute, Rhinelander School of the Arts, University of Wisconsin- Steven's Point's Arts World, and the University of Wisconsin- Oshkosh Writing Project for teachers. Even though Kort had a huge resume, she still had a mission which was to teach poetry to anyone and everyone that wanted to learn. Kort wanted everyone to have access to poetry, and she believed that poetry was not just for one type of person, but it was for everyone. She would travel though Wisconsin where she would facilitate poetry workshops in schools, for at-risk youth, grieving parents, domestic abuse survivors, and women in prison. She not only traveled through Wisconsin, but she started to travel with her poetry thought-out the United States, New Zealand, Australia, the Bahamas, and Japan. Kort also wrote eleven books and eight collections of poetry while she was alive. A few of her published collections of poetry include "If Death Were a Women" and "The Sacred Grove". Kort's poetry has also been performed by the New York City Dance Theatre. Kort died April 21, 2015, at age 79.

== Awards ==
- Pablo Neruda Literary Prize for Poetry
- Columbia Pacific Review Poetry Award
- Wisconsin Sesquicentennial Poetry Award
- Wisconsin Regional Writers' Jade Ring Award
- Bard's Chair for Poetry
