= Chip Chats =

American magazine

- Editor-in-chief: Edward Gallenstein
- Categories: Woodcarving
- Total circulation: 13,000+
- Founded: 1953
- Country: United States
- Based in: Cincinnati, Ohio
- Language: English
- Website: https://chipchats.org/
- ISSN: 0577-9294

Chip Chats is a bimonthly publication by the National Wood Carvers Association (NWCA). The magazine highlights individual art from every single state in the United States and various other countries. The magazine also offers local club information for wood carvers interested in local chapter details.

== History ==
Chip Chats started as a mimeographed newsletter. Edward Gallenstein (president of the NWCA) took over the 450-subscriber newsletter in 1965. By 1995, the newsletter-turned-magazine gathered 55,000 subscribers. His family helped him create issues and manage the business. Ed Gallenstein died in 2015.
