= John Darnton (American football) =

American football coach

Biographical details
- Born: October 13, 1918; Lenawee County, Michigan, U.S.
- Died: April 3, 2015 (aged 96); Alpena, Michigan, U.S.

Coaching career (HC unless noted)

Football
- 1950: Adrian

Basketball
- 1950–1951: Adrian

Head coaching record
- Overall: 2–6 (football); 5–17 (basketball)

Chester John Darnton (October 13, 1918 – April 3, 2015) was an American football and basketball coach. Darnton was the head football coach at Adrian College in Adrian, Michigan for one season, in 1950, compiling a record of 2–6. He graduated from Adrian in 1943. He was also the head basketball coach at Adrian for the 1950–51 season, tallying a mark of 5–17.

== Head coaching record ==
=== Football ===
Year	Team	Overall	Conference	Standing	Bowl/playoffs
Adrian Bulldogs (Michigan Intercollegiate Athletic Association) (1950)
1950	Adrian	2–6	0–5	6th	
Adrian:		2–6	0–5		
Total:		2–6			
