= Doug Gregory =

English Royal Air Force officer

- Born: Ivan Douglas Gregory; January 13, 1923; Southampton, England
- Died: April 12, 2015 (aged 92)
- Military career
- Allegiance: United Kingdom
- Service years: 1941–1946
- Conflicts: World War II

Ivan Douglas Gregory DFC (13 January 1923 – 12 April 2015) was a Royal Air Force officer, who won the Distinguished Flying Cross during the Second World War, and later became the oldest stunt pilot in Britain. He died as a result of injuries received in a car crash.
