= Luis Ortega Álvarez =

Spanish magistrate

Luis Ignacio Ortega Álvarez
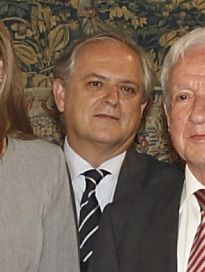
- Ortega during a meeting with María Dolores de Cospedal in 2013

Judge of the Constitutional Court of Spain
- In office 12 January 2011 – 15 April 2015

Personal details
- Born: 14 January 1953 Madrid, Spain
- Died: 15 April 2015 (aged 62)
- Education: University of Castilla–La Mancha
- Occupation: Judge, professor
- Known for: Expert in Spanish public law, judge of the Constitutional Court

Luis Ignacio Ortega Álvarez (14 January 1953 – 15 April 2015) was a Spanish judge. He served on the Constitutional Court of Spain since January 2011. He was noted as an expert of Spanish public law.

== Biography ==
Ortega was born in 1953 in Madrid. He did his doctoral studies in Rome. Ortega worked at the University of Castilla–La Mancha (UCLM) since 1988. He obtained the Jean Monnet chair in 1999 and started the Center for European Studies at the UCLM.

On 12 January 2011 he was installed as judge on the Constitutional Court of Spain. In 2010 he was elected by the Senate of Spain on proposal of the parliament of Castilla-La Mancha. He was noted as a defender of civil and workers rights on the court, writing dissenting opinions against the majority vote.

Ortega died on 15 April 2015, aged 62. He had an infarction while present in the Constitutional Court building during a recess of the court.
