= Raul Loya =

Mexican-American civil rights activist (1938–2015)

- Born: Raul Bejarano Loya; June 30, 1938; Miami, Arizona, U.S.
- Died: April 1, 2015 (aged 76)
- Occupations: Teacher; Civil rights activist
- Spouse: Servita Loya
- Children: Ana Maria, Patricia and Katherine

Raul Loya (born Raul Bejarano Loya; 30 June 1938 – 1 April 2015) was a Mexican-American workers' rights activist, known for his association with Cesar Chavez and the National Farm Workers Association.

== Early life ==
Raul Loya was born June 30, 1938, in Miami, Arizona to Mike and Petra Loya. He became the first member of his family to graduate college when he received his Master's degree in Education from Northern Arizona University.

== Activism ==
Upset by injustices he witnessed firsthand working as a copper miner in Miami, Arizona Raul decided to attend college and became the first member of his family to graduate college. After graduation he and his wife Servita taught in Navajo and Apache reservations in Arizona in White River and Ganado where they had their first daughter Anamaria. In 1965 they moved to the Coachella Valley where he earned a reputation as a dedicated educator and fierce advocates of worker's rights. This is where he initially associated with Cesar Chavez's movement. and became one of the pillars of the farm worker movement in the Valley. In his efforts to expose the injustices faced by farm workers, he met with elected officials and tried to raise awareness through the press. When the press ignored his requests, he and his friends Alfredo Fuller and Ray Rodriguez started their own newspaper in a small house on Sage Street in Indio, California. The newspaper was then called IDEAL and it was acknowledged as the first newspaper for the Chicano community in the United States. The archives of IDEAL are kept at UC Berkeley and Stanford University.

In 1967 when the organizing intensified in the vineyards of the Coachella Valley, Raul Loya and a group of other activists, including Jim Caswell, Ray Rodriguez, Paulo Carrizales, Manuel Chavez, and a few others met at Loya's house to plan the strike. Afterwards, on May 28, 1967. Cesar Chavez traveled to the Indio Fairgrounds in Coachella and with the help of then-president of the MAPA, Bert Corona as well as the help of community leaders, Mexican officials and the Mexican CTM, they obtained support from Congressman John Tunney to receive his endorsement for the union boycott.

When Cesar Chavez's union prepared to strike the vineyards in the Coachella Valley in May 1968, Jim Caswell and Raul Loya released a press statement where they encouraged citizens, merchants, the police department and local papers to reflect on their stand concerning Cesar Chavez and his farm workers union.

On July 4, 1968, Democratic Congressman John Tunney from the 38th District spoke at a rally in Coachella. Chavez supporters, led by Raul Loya and Jim Caswell were angered by Tunney's refusal to support the grape boycott. When Tunney began to speak about farm-labor problems, omitting any mention of Chavez or the boycott, union supporters began to clap and cheer, drowning out Tunney's speech.

In 1969, Raul Loya was admonished from Indio High School for unprofessional conduct after he was censured by trustees of the Desert Sands Unified School District for participating in the "clapdown" Congressman John Tunney's speech. Loya was later allowed to retain his teaching credentials. Loya also served prison time at the Banning Road Camp because of this incident. During his imprisonment, his second daughter, Patricia was born. In prison, Raul met inmates who were also unjustly there and wrote letters on their behalf.

Raul and the three other defendants appealed their sentence and continued the legal battle while behind bars. They were supported by the Mexican American Legal Defense and Educational Fund and their case eventually made it to the Supreme Court of California and was overturned. The four defendants; Raul Loya, Tom Kay, James Caswell and Alfredo Figueroa became known as the California Four after their release.

In 1970, Loya sought the 75th State Assembly District seat as a Democrat.

== Personal life ==
Raul married Servita Loya in 1965 is survived by his children: Ana Maria, Patricia and Katherine as well as several grandchildren.
