= Wang Guozhen =

Chinese poet

- 汪国真
- Born: June 22, 1956; Beijing, China
- Died: April 26, 2015 (aged 58); Beijing, China
- Education: Jinan University
- Occupation: Poet
- Writing career
- Language: Chinese
- Period: 1980–1925
- Genre: Poem
- Notable work: Top Modem Chinese Poem: Wang Guozhen's 80 Poems in English Verse

Wang Guozhen (simplified Chinese: 汪国真; traditional Chinese: 汪國真; pinyin: Wāng Guózhēn; 22 June 1956 – 26 April 2015) was a Chinese poet.

== Biography ==
Wang was born in Beijing on June 22, 1956, with his ancestral home in Xiamen, Fujian. After middle school, he worked at the Fourth Optical Instrument Factory of Beijing. After the Cultural Revolution, he graduated from Jinan University in 1982, majoring in Chinese literature. After college, he was assigned to China Art Research Institute, and later became a deputy director of Chinese Art Yearbook.

Wang started to publish works in 1984, his first poem, I Smile To Live, was published in the Young People.

Wang was a regular contributor for Liaoning Youth, China Youth, and Girlfriend since 1990.

On May 21, 1990, his first poetry, Young Tide, was published by Beijing Xueyuan Publishing House.

On June 1, 2013, his poetry, Top Modern Chinese Poems: Wang Guozhen's 80 Poems in English Verse, was translated into English and published by Tsinghua University.

On April 26, 2015, Wang died of liver cancer in Beijing.

== Poetry ==
- Top Modern Chinese Poems: Wang Guozhen's 80 Poems in English Verse
- Journey (Chinese: 旅程)
- Going the Distance (Chinese: 走向远方)
- If You Are Unhappy (Chinese: 假如你不够快乐)
- Love Life (Chinese: 热爱生命)
- Young Tide (Chinese: 年轻的潮)
- The Distance Is Far and The Mountain Is High (Chinese: 山高路远)
- If Life Ain't Generous Enough (Chinese: 如果生活不够慷慨)
- Beyond Yourself (Chinese: 跨越自己)
- If Your Talent Is Not Acknowledged (Chinese: 倘若才华得不到承认)
