= Don Hansey =

American politician

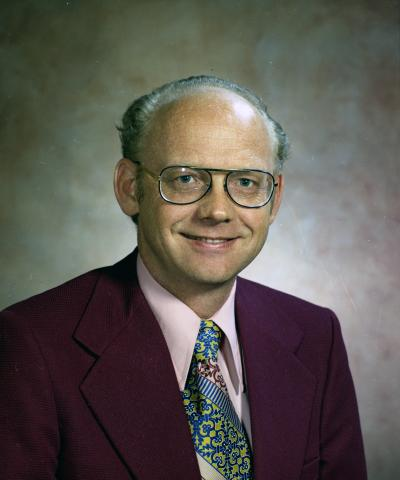
- Hansey in 1973

Member of the Washington House of Representatives for the 40th, 42nd district
- In office 1971–1977

Personal details
- Born: Donald Gordon Hansey; August 21, 1929 Everett, Washington, United States
- Died: April 3, 2015 (aged 85) Bellingham, Washington, United States
- Party: Republican

Donald Gordon Hansey (August 21, 1929 – April 3, 2015) was an American politician in the state of Washington. He served the 42nd district from 1971 to 1973 and the 40th district from 1973 to 1977.
