= Willie Honicutt =

American baseball player

- Born: June 10, 1932; Chattanooga, Tennessee
- Died: April 8, 2015 (aged 82); Grand Rapids, Michigan

Teams
- Grand Rapids Black Sox; Kansas City Monarchs; Detroit Stars

Willie James "Honey" Honicutt, Jr. (June 10, 1932 - April 8, 2015) was an American Negro league baseball player. He played in the negro leagues until 1960, playing for the Grand Rapids Black Sox, Kansas City Monarchs and Detroit Stars.

Honicutt was born on June 10, 1932, to Willie Hunnicutt SR and Josephine Hunnicutt. He was the second oldest of five children. Willie moved to Grand Rapids, MI in 1945. Willie attended South High School where he participated in football, track and baseball. He also took up boxing and at the age of 17 became a runner-up for the Grand Rapids Golden Gloves 118lb Division. At 15 Honicutt joined the Grand Rapids Colored Athletics, a semi-professional baseball team. Honicutt began playing for the Grand Rapids Black Sox, Kansas City Monarch and the Detroit Stars. He played both 2nd base and outfielder. Willie tried out for the Brooklyn Dodgers and Chicago White Sox, however didn't make the teams. During his try-outs with the Dodger organization he tied the record for the fastest run between 1st and 2nd base.

In 1972 at the age of 40 Willie accepted his call into the ministry and served as an Assistant Minister for ten years before becoming a pastor of his own church Hilliard Chapel A.M.E. Zion Church of Grand Rapids, MI. Willie attended Hood Seminary and also took courses at Grand Rapids Baptist College.

He was born in Chattanooga, Tennessee, and died in Grand Rapids, Michigan.

In 1958 Willie met Birta Lee Shelly and they married on December 27, 1958. Willie and Birta had 10 children together. Willie had two sons from previous relationships.
