= Traute Foresti =

Austrian poet and actress

Traute Foresti (15 March 1915 in Payerbach – 3 April 2015 in Vienna) was an Austrian poet and actress.

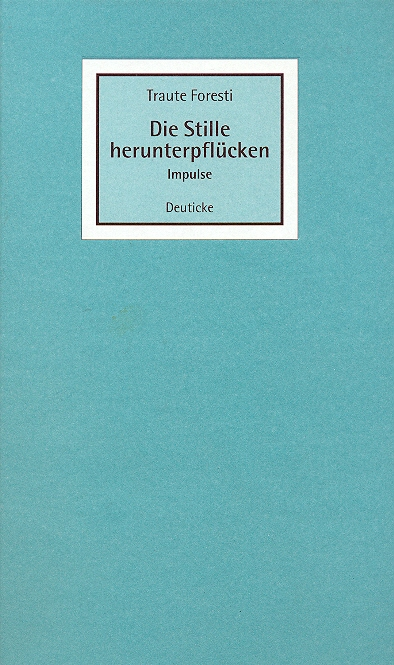
