= Eve Shelnutt =

American poet

Eve Shelnutt (1941 in Spartanburg, South Carolina – April 7, 2015) was an American poet and writer of short stories. She lived in Kalamazoo, Michigan, Pittsburgh, Pennsylvania, Athens, Ohio, and Worcester, Massachusetts. Over the course of her career, she taught at Western Michigan University University of Pittsburgh, Ohio University, and The College of the Holy Cross.

== Education ==
She received her B.A. from University of Cincinnati. She received her M.F.A. from University of North Carolina, Greensboro where she studied with Fred Chappell under the auspices of The Randall Jarrell Fellowship.

== Awards ==
She received the O. Henry Prize in 1975 for "Angel", Shenandoah, Winter 1974, Abrahams.

She won the Mademoiselle Fiction Award.

Literary Fellowships:

- MacDowell Colony
- Virginia Center for the Creative Arts
- Yaddo

== Works ==
The Love Child. Black Sparrow Press (1979), short fiction. Awarded The Great Lakes Fiction Award.

The Formal Voice. Black Sparrow Press (1982), short fiction. Awarded the Withrop College Press Award for 1982.

Descant. Palaemon Press (1982)

Air and Salt. Carnegie Mellon University Press, (1983), poetry

The Musician. Black Sparrow Press (1987), short fiction

Recital in a Private Home. Carnegie-Mellon University Press (1989), poetry

The Writing Room: Keys to the Craft of Fiction and Poetry. Longstreet Press (1989)

When We Were Cherished. Carnegie Mellon Poetry Series (2013), poetry

Writing: The Translation of Memory. Macmillan Pub Co (April 1990)

The Confidence Woman. Longstreet Press (1991), Editor, essays

First a Long Hesitation. Carnegie-Mellon University Press (1992)

My Poor Elephant: 27 Male Writers at Work. Longstreet Press (1992), Editor, essays

The Magic Pencil: Teaching Children Creative Writing : Exercises and Activities for Children, Their Parents, and Their Teachers. Peachtree Publishers (1994)

The Girl, Painted: Stories. Carnegie-Mellon University Press (1996), short fiction

Ms Shelnutt's short fiction has also published in the following quarterly literary reviews:

Agni Review ["Driving to the Interior: Elizabeth Bishop, Guide," AGNI:26; "The Formal Voice," AGNI:13; "Timing," AGNI: 10/11.], American Review, Black Warrior Review, Carolina Quarterly, Denver Quarterly, Great Lakes Review, The Literary Review, Palaemon Press, Ploughshares ["The Pilot-Messenger," Vol. 6, No. 4 (1981), pp. 123–130] ["The Beguiling Idiot," Vol. 13, No. 2/3 (1987), pp. 90–99.], Prairie Schooner, Quarterly West, Slow Loris Reader, Story Quarterly, and West Branch.

Her poetry has appeared in:

American Review, Apalachee Quarterly, Chattahoochee Review, New Delta Review, New Poets Review, Nimrod, North American Review, Oxford Magazine, Pig Iron Anthology, Poet & Critic, Sow's Ear, Spoon River Quarterly, Tar River Poetry, etc.

Reviews

Greene, Melissa Fay. Review of The Musician in The Iowa Review, Vol. 18, No. 2 (Spring - Summer, 1988), pp. 174–177.

Martin, David. Review of "The Musician" in Cream City Review, Spring 1988.

Special Collections

- William Peden Short Story Collection, MU Libraries, University of Missouri
1. Eve Shelnutt to William Peden, 6 March 1986
2. William Peden to Eve Shelnutt, 13 March 1986
