= Chris Plumridge =

British golf correspondent and author (1944–2015)

Chris Plumridge (21 April 1944 – 3 April 2015) was a British golf correspondent and the author of numerous books about golf. He was the golf columnist for The Sunday Telegraph, and also wrote columns for Golf Illustrated and Punch, as well as other newspapers and magazines internationally.

Plumridge was born on 21 April 1944 at Fulmer near Gerrards Cross. Growing up, he started playing golf with his elder brother Tim at the Flackwell Heath course in Buckinghamshire.

Early in his career, Plumridge wrote that many prominent golf players had physical "imperfections", such as one leg longer than the other, which might be improving their game.

He died of complications from respiratory failure.
