= Irene Woodall =

American journalist

- Born: April 15, 1946
- Died: April 22, 2015 (aged 69); Chicago, Illinois, United States

Irene Rita Woodall (April 15, 1946 – April 22, 2015) was an American magazine editor.

== Biography ==
Woodall was born on April 15, 1946. She was the cofounder of RDH magazine, on which she collaborated with magazine publisher Craig Stevens. She served as the first editor from 1981 to 1993. Woodall also led the dental hygiene programs at Kalamazoo Valley Community College and the University of Pennsylvania. She stepped down from RDH in 1993 due to an aneurysm she suffered while skiing in Colorado. She had a stroke during the surgery that followed. Woodall was later diagnosed with Parkinson's disease. She died of Parkinson's disease in 2015, age 69.
