= Olga Sawicka =

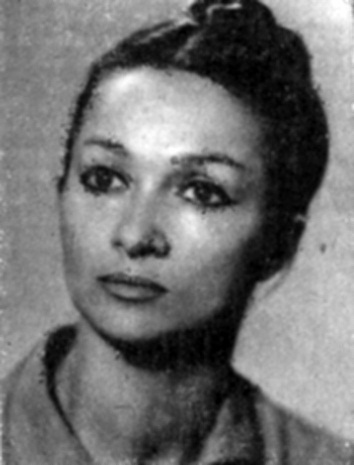
Sawicka in 1969

Olga Sawicka (7 February 1932, in Poznań – 2 April 2015) was a Polish dancer and choreographer. She was the prima ballerina of the Opera St Moniuszko, Poznań (1963–74). She was director of the ballet at the Music Theatre in Poznań (1974–76).

Sawicka died in Skolimów-Konstancin, Poland, aged 83.

== Other websites ==
Media related to Olga Sawicka at Wikimedia Commons
