= Serhiy Sukhobok =

Ukrainian journalist and entrepreneur (1964–2015)

- Сергій Сухобок
- Born: June 1964; Pavlodar, Kazakh SSR, Soviet Union
- Died: 13 April 2015 (aged 50); Kyiv, Ukraine
- Other name: Sergei Sukhobok
- Citizenship: Ukraine
- Occupation: journalist

Serhiy Anatoliyovich Sukhobok (Ukrainian: Сергій Анатолійович Сухобок) was a Ukrainian journalist and entrepreneur. He founded the newspaper Viddzerkalennya and co-founded two online publications, ProUA and Obkom.

The son of Ukrainians from Chernihiv, Sukhobok was born in June 1964 in Pavlodar, Kazakh SSR, and studied at Donetsk National Technical University. He was critical of oligarchs, particularly Rinat Akhmetov, and state officials. Sukhobok was killed on 13 April 2015 on a dacha near Kyiv, during a dispute that turned violent.
