= Hawk-i =

Medical insurance program in Iowa, US

hawk-i is a medical insurance program run by the U.S. state of Iowa. It provides health care coverage for low-income children of citizens and qualified aliens. It is designed to supplement Medicaid by covering children whose family's income is above the Medicaid limit but below the hawk-i limit.

The Healthy and Well Kids in Iowa (Hawki) Medicaid program is Iowa's version of the federal Children's Health Insurance Program (CHIP). It provides health insurance for children and families who don't qualify for Medicaid (known as Title 19) and can't otherwise afford coverage.
