= Peter Jones (British Army officer) =

Colonel Michael Peter Feltham Jones CBE DSO (19 October 1919 - 11 April 2015) was a British Army officer of the Brigade of Gurkhas who was awarded an Immediate DSO at the Battle of Enfidaville in Tunisia, 1943.
