= Barbara Strauch =

Barbara Ellen Strauch (May 10, 1951 – April 15, 2015) was an American author, reporter, and newspaper editor. In 1992, she and the New York Newsday staff won the Pulitzer Prize for Spot News Reporting.

== Biography ==
She was born in Evanston, Illinois to Frederic Strauch Jr., and Claire Christiansen. The family later moved to California. Her father worked as an electrical engineer, while her mother was a reporter for the Daily Pilot. Strauch attended the University of California, Berkeley and graduated with a bachelor's degree in English. She then worked for newspapers in New England, Venezuela, and Houston, before joining the New York Newsday, where she became a senior editor. The paper ceased publication in 1995, and Strauch joined The New York Times. She covered science as an assistant editor from 2000 to 2004, when she was named the health editor. She became the head science editor in 2011, and held the position until 2015. She died, aged 63, at her home in Rye, New York of breast cancer in April 2015.

She was married to Richard Breeden, with whom she had two children.

== Books ==
- —— (2003). The Primal Teen: What the New Discoveries about the Teenage Brain Help Us about Our Kids. Doubleday. ISBN 9780385503396.
- —— (2003). Why are They So Weird?: What's Really Going on in a Teenager's Brain. Bloomsbury. ISBN 9780747563167.
- —— (2010). The Secret Life of the Grown-up Brain: The Surprising Talents of the Middle-Aged Mind. Penguin. ISBN 9781101190081.
