= Waltraud Falk =

German economist

Waltraud Falk (12 February 1930 - 10 April 2015) was born in Berlin as Waltraud Tessen and became an economist.

After completing her baccalaureate in 1948 in Berlin, Waltraud Falk enrolled to study medicine at the Humboldt University of Berlin. Her focus changed to economics and she eventually completed her degree in economics in 1952. She completed her PhD in economics and took up a position as a lecturer at the Humboldt University of Berlin. She became a professor and then dean at the faculty of social sciences and remained in that post until 1990. She was one of a small number of female academics who obtained a top post at a leading university in East Germany. Falk edited the first complete edition in English of Das Kapital by Karl Marx as part of the Marx-Engels-Gesamtausgabe.

== Works ==
- Die Knappschaftsfessel von Mansfeld, Verlag Tribüne, 1958
- Der Charakter der gesellschaftlichen Arbeit im Kapitalismus, Sozialismus und Kommunismus : Problematik, Bestimmung, Merkmale, Durchsetzung und Veränderung (Habilitation), Berlin 1962
- Kleine Geschichte einer großen Bewegung, Dietz, 1966
- Wirtschaft, Wissenschaft, Welthöchststand, Verlag Die Wirtschaft, 1969
- mit Dieter Klein als Herausgeberin: Lebensweise im Kapitalismus – Ideologie und Wirklichkeit, Humboldt-Universität zu Berlin. Gesellschaftswissenschaftliche Fakultät, 1981
- Herausgeberin und Mitautorin: Nie wieder Faschismus und Krieg! Die Mahnung der faschistischen Bücherverbrennung am 10. Mai 1933, Humboldt-Universität zu Berlin, Gesellschaftswissenschaftliche Fakultät, 1983
- (Rezension) Waltraud Falk, Herwart Pittack: Karl Marx/Friedrich Engels: Gesamtausgabe (MEGA). Vierte Abteilung. Exzerpte, Notizen, Marginalien. Band 6 – Karl Marx: Exzerpte und Notizen. September 1846 bis Dezember 1847, Berlin 1983. In: Marx-Engels-Jahrbuch 8. Dietz Verlag, Berlin 1985, S. 362–370. Digitalisat
- Waltraud Falk, Frank Zschaler: Zur ersten englischen Auflage des ersten Bandes des „Kapitals“ von Karl Marx. In: Beiträge zur Marx-Engels-Forschung 23, Berlin 1987, S. 78–81. Digitalisat
- Waltraud Falk, Frank Zschaler: Zur Geschichte der englischen Erstausgabe des ersten Bandes des „Kapitals“. In: Marx-Engels-Jahrbuch 12, Dietz Verlag, Berlin 1988, S. 203–228. Digitalisat
- Karl Marx. Capital a critical analysis of capitalist production. London 1887. Dietz Verlag, Berlin 1990. (=Karl Marx. Friedrich Engels Gesamtausgabe (MEGA). Abteilung II- Band 9) ISBN 3-320-00067-5.
