= Edward Gallenstein =

American artist (1922–2015)

Edward F. Gallenstein

President of the National Wood Carvers Association
- In office 1971–2015
- Preceded by: Stephen LePage
- Succeeded by: Bill Staley

Personal details
- Born: October 9, 1922 Maysville, Kentucky
- Died: April 7, 2015 (aged 92) Cincinnati, Ohio

Military service
- Allegiance: United States
- Branch/service: United States Navy
- Years of service: 1942-1945
- Battles/wars: World War II

Edward F. Gallenstein (October 9, 1922 – April 7, 2015) was an American woodcarver and editor, who served as the second President of the National Wood Carvers Association, during which time he was also the Editor-in-Chief of the woodcarving magazine Chip Chats.

== Personal life ==
Edward Francis Gallenstein was born in Maysville, Kentucky on October 9, 1922. He was the son of Edward Gallenstein and Luella Greenlee. He served in the United States Navy during World War II in the Aleutian Islands, where he was stationed on Attu Island with Fleet Air Wing Four. He belonged to the Cincinnati Carvers Guild. He died in Cincinnati, Ohio on April 7, 2015.

== Career ==
Gallenstein began his career in journalism working for newspapers in Kentucky and Arizona, before he joined The Cincinnati Enquirer. After retiring from the Enquirer, Gallenstein became Editor-in-Chief of Chip Chats, then a small newsletter, and he made the publication into the then-largest woodcarving magazine in the world. He was elected president of the National Wood Carvers Association in 1971, and he served in this position until his death.

Gallenstein explained basic wood carving to the Scouting Magazine in 2002. According to him, there are three distinct ways of wood carving: relief carving, three-dimensional carving, and chip carving.
