= Peter B. Best =

English marine biologist (1939–2015)

Peter Barrington Best
- Born: 1939; London, England
- Died: 22 April 2015 (aged 75–76); Cape Town, South Africa
- Education: Cambridge University
- Known for: Whales and dolphins of the Southern African region
- Spouse: Margaret Ann Ralph (m.1974)
- Children: 2
- Awards: FRSSAf
- Scientific career
- Fields: Cetacean biology
- Workplaces: Saldanha Bay whaling station Sea Fisheries Research Institute; University of Pretoria
- Thesis: Studies of South African Cetacea with special reference to the sperm whale (Physeter catodon) (1971)

Peter Barrington Best FRSSAf (1939 – 22 April 2015) was an English marine biologist known for his research on whales and dolphins of Southern Africa. He was described as the world's foremost authority on the whales and dolphins of the Southern African region.

Best was an Extraordinary Professor and Head of the Whale Unit at the Mammal Research Institute of the University of Pretoria. He was well known for his work on whales and dolphins but also studied seals.

He is credited with initiating research into Southern right whales in the Southern African region in 1969 and of starting the on-going annual aerial survey of these whales in 1979.

From 1971, Best made recommendations to the Minister of Environmental Affairs on South Africa's policies relating to whaling and conservation of whales on behalf of the department of Marine and Coastal Management.

== Education and career ==
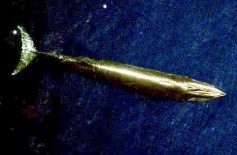
Image of a Bryde's Whale

Best was born in 1939, in London, and was educated at Bradfield College in Berkshire, matriculating in 1957. He spent two summers at the Antarctic whaling factory Balaena as a chemist's assistant. He spent a winter at the Saldanha Bay whaling station near Cape Town where he collected biological specimens including those for the Bryde's whale.

He then went to Cambridge University where he earned a BA Honours in 1962, after which he worked as a whale researcher with the Fisheries Development Corporation of South Africa (abolished in 1987, now part of the DAFF) in Cape Town until 1969. He was awarded a PhD from Cambridge in 1971 based on the data he collected during this time. His thesis was titled Studies of South African Cetacea with special reference to the sperm whale (Physeter catodon). This was one of the first degrees awarded by Cambridge for fieldwork done elsewhere.

From 1969 to 1984, he worked at the Sea Fisheries Research Institute in Cape Town, a Professional Officer, later Senior Professional Officer and finally Chief Professional Officer. He then joined the Mammal Research Institute of the University of Pretoria in 1985, working first as an Antarctic/Senior Research Officer between 1985 and 2004 and extraordinary professor from 2004 onward.

=== Field research ===
Best conducted extensive field research including specimen collections from the Antarctic and from South African whaling stations; whale marking surveys off the South African and Indian coasts; aerial surveys of Southern right whales (personally conducted between 1969 and 2004 and supervised until 2014); and surveys of fur seals off the Namibian and west South African coast. He was also involved in surveys of migrating humpback whales, photo-identification of Heaviside's dolphins, and southern right whale feeding patterns.

== Memberships, awards, and recognition ==
Best was a member of and recognised by several organisations, including:

- Elected a Fellow of the Royal Society of South Africa in 2004
- Charter member of the Society of Marine Mammalogy
- Awarded the Cape Times Centenary Medal (1993)
- Gold medal of the Zoological Society of Southern Africa (1998)
- Gilchrist Memorial Medal (2005)
- Commemorative Research Medal, University of Pretoria (2008)

He was a member of several research committees, including:

- International Whaling Commission (1971-1983 on Scientific committee)
- Chaired several sub-committees on endangered whales species, humpback whales and Minke whales
- International Union for Conservation of Nature (IUCN) / Species Survival Commission (SSC) Group of Specialists on Whales (1971-1975)
- IUCN / SSC Group of Specialists on Seals (1983 - 1986)
- IUCN / SSC Group of Specialists on Cetaceans (1985- )
- Committee of Scientific Advisors of the Society for Marine Mammalogy (2003- )

Between 1985 and 1995, Best acted as associate editor of Marine Mammal Science.

In 2007, Best was conference chair for 17th Biennial Conference on the Biology of Marine Mammals in Cape Town.

== Selected publications ==
Best published more than 160 academic papers in peer-reviewed journals, wrote more than 20 articles in popular works and authored 3 books, including:

=== Books ===
- Best, P.B.; Ansorge, I.; Lutjeharms, J.; Perrin, W. (2008). Whales and Dolphins of the Southern African Subregion. Cambridge University Press. ISBN 978-0-521-89710-5.

=== Journal publications ===
- Ross, G.J.B.; Best, P.B.; Shaugnessy, P.D. (1978). "New Records of Crabeater Seals (Lobodon Carcinophagus) from South Africa: Tab". Annals of the South African Museum. Trustees of the South African Museum. ISBN 978-0-908407-40-8.
- Best, Peter B.; Photopoulou, Theoni (7 April 2016). Miller, Patrick J. O. (ed.). "Identifying the "demon whale-biter": Patterns of scarring on large whales attributed to a cookie-cutter shark Isistius sp". PLOS One. 11 (4) e0152643. Public Library of Science (PLoS). Bibcode:2016PLoSO..1152643B. doi:10.1371/journal.pone.0152643. ISSN 1932-6203. PMC 4824425. PMID 27055057.
- Best, PB; Meÿer, MA; Thornton, M; Kotze, PGH; Seakamela, SM; Hofmeyr, GJG; Wintner, S; Weland, CD; Steinke, D (2014). "Confirmation of the occurrence of a second killer whale morphotype in South African waters" (PDF). African Journal of Marine Science. 36 (2): 215–224. Bibcode:2014AfJMS..36..215B. doi:10.2989/1814232X.2014.923783. hdl:2263/42023. S2CID 3947611.

== Personal life ==
Best married Margaret Ann Ralph in June 1974 and they had two children, Robert and Alison.
