= Eduardo Gauggel Medina =

Honduran politician (1967–2015)

José Eduardo de Jesús Gauggel Medina (1967 – 10 April 2015) was a Honduran lawyer and politician who served as member of the National Congress of Honduras from 2014 until his murder in 2015. He was the son of Eduardo Gauggel Rivas, also a former Supreme Court justice, who was killed alongside him in the same shooting.

They were ambushed in front of their house in Los Andes, when they had returned from a visit to their hometown of Copán. The elder Gauggel, who had apparently exited their armoured Land Cruiser to open the gate, was found on the driveway, while his son was shot to death in the driver's seat. Gauggel Medina was armed and was able to wound one of the assailants before he was killed. Witnesses reported the assailants were in multiple vehicles.
