= Rocco Quattrocchi =

American politician

Rocco Anthony Quattrocchi

Rhode Island House of Representatives
- In office 1969–1970

Rhode Island State Senate
- In office 1971–1984

Personal details
- Born: January 13, 1927 Providence, Rhode Island
- Died: April 10, 2015 (aged 88)
- Party: Democrat

Rocco Anthony Quattrocchi (January 13, 1927 – April 10, 2015) was an American politician and businessman.

Born in Providence, Rhode Island, Quattrocchi went to Classical High School, University of Bologna Medical School, and University of Rhode Island. He served in the United States Army during World War II. Quattrocchi owned The Douglas Oil Company. He served in the Rhode Island House of Representatives in 1969 and 1970 and in the Rhode Island State Senate from 1971 to 1984. Quattrocchi was a Democrat and had also served as the Rhode Island state Democratic chairman.
