= Norman Sheppard =

British chemist (1921–2015)

Norman Sheppard FRS (16 May 1921 — 10 April 2015) was a chemist and expert on the application of vibrational spectroscopy to molecular structure, in solids, on surfaces, in solution and in the gas phase.

== Biography ==
Norman Sheppard was born at 15 St Hilda Street Hull on 16 May 1921, son of Walter (who worked for Reckitt & Colman) and Anne Clarges (née Finding). After attending Hymers College from 1930 to 1940, where he developed a liking for physical chemistry, he went up to St Catharine's College, Cambridge in 1940, and graduated in 1943. He studied for his PhD under Gordon Sutherland and was awarded the higher degree in 1947.

With Sutherland's support, Sheppard was appointed visiting associate professor at Penn State for the year 1947–1948. The 26 year old sailed on the Marine Tiger from Southampton to New York on 30 August 1947. He had a successful year, resulting in his contributing to a paper on Raman spectra and rotational isomerism.

Sheppard returned to the UK on the Queen Mary in September 1948 and re-joined Sutherland's group in the Department of Colloid Science. He later became a member of the Spectroscopic Panel of the Institute of Petroleum, and received funding over three years, sufficient to set up a research group. Sheppard was next appointed assistant director of research in spectroscopy in the university chemical laboratory, and a teaching fellow at Trinity College, Cambridge in 1955. He became aware of the growing importance of NMR and persuaded head of department Professor Todd to seek the funding for one of the expensive machines.

In the 1960s, when new universities were being established in the UK, former Cambridge colleague Alan Katritzky moved to UEA; he soon persuaded Sheppard to do the same, to teach in physical chemistry. Sheppard set up a research group and gained a professorship. He resigned his chair in 1986.

His research contributions throughout his career, which were many and important, are described in the Royal Society's memoir.

He was president of the Faraday Division of the Royal Society of Chemistry, and was elected Fellow of the Royal Society in 1967.

=== Family ===
While at Penn State, Sheppard was invited by a Cambridge friend (Don Ramsay) to spend Christmas in Ottawa. There, at a party in Ramsay's lab, he met Kay (Kathleen Margery McLean). They were married on 24 March 1949 at St Jude's, Hull, and had four children: Eric (1950), Hugh (1953), Elaine (1956) and Andrew (1960).

Kay Sheppard died in Norwich on 5 October 2005. Norman died at Norfolk and Norwich University Hospital on 10 April 2015, of aspiration pneumonia following a stroke.
