= Samriddhi The Prosperity Foundation =

Nepali think tank

Samriddhi Foundation
- Formation: 2006
- Type: Think tank
- Headquarters: Bhimsengola Marga, Minbhawan, Kathmandu, Nepal
- Staff: 18
- Website: www.samriddhi.org

Samriddhi Foundation is an independent—non-partisan, research and educational, not-for-profit—public policy institute based in Kathmandu, Nepal. It was founded in 2006. It promotes the process of generating alternative ideas from the general public by conducting research and performing other activities on the social, economic and political arenas of Nepal.

In 2009, Samriddhi was awarded the Dorian & Antony Fisher Venture Grants, a program to help some of the most promising young think tanks in the world by Atlas Economic Research Foundation.

== Objectives ==
1. To conduct research and generate alternative ides on the social, economic and political agendas to throw light upon the contemporary issues of public discourse and come up with policy advocacy documents to bring them into wider rhetoric.

2. To lobby for and monitor the implementation of basic social, political and economic rights while promoting transparency and advocacy as the basis of a prosperous Nepal.

3. To educate, train and empower public on active citizenry, ideas of free society and entrepreneurship, and the role they can play at influencing policy level decisions.

4. To develop a comprehensive resource center for public use (especially for researchers, students and policy makers) focusing on the social, economic and political discourse moving forward at a given time period.

== Programs ==
Arthalaya (5-days seminar on economics and entrepreneurship for university level students) and Last Thursdays Entrepreneurs Speak (an interaction with prominent entrepreneurs of Nepal) are some of the popular programs of Samriddhi.
