= Luis Delgado Aparicio =

Peruvian politician

Luis Humberto Delgado Aparicio Porta (28 September 1940 – 2 April 2015) was a Peruvian politician. He served in the Congress of the Republic of Peru from 1995 to 2001. Before serving as a congressman, Aparicio was a delegate from 1990 through 1992. He was born in Callao, Peru.

After his daughter Verónica died in the 2002 Utopía nightclub fire, he became the leader of the relatives of those who also died in their legal process against the club's owners.

Aparicio died in Lima, Peru from pancreatic cancer, aged 74.
