= Hermann Schweppenhäuser =

German philosopher and publisher

Hermann Schweppenhäuser (12 March 1928 – 8 April 2015) was a German philosopher, publisher, and aphorist. He was a professor at the Institute for Social Research in Frankfurt am Main, Germany. Schweppenhäuser published over 100 books, and together with Rolf Tiedemann he edited Walter Benjamin's collected works. He was born in Frankfurt am Main.

Since 2019, his collected works are being edited in six volumes by Thomas Friedrich, Sven Kramer, and Schweppenhäuser's son Gerhard.

Heideggers Ontologie, die der Sprache alles gibt und den Menschen alles nimmt, verhält diese zur Unmündigkeit. Mit der faktischen Stummheit der Menschen verklärt sie die Misere als Geschick, das erst das Sein werde.

Hermann Schweppenhäuser died in Deutsch Evern, Germany at the age of 87.

== See also ==
- Socialism
- World Peace
