= Eduardo Gauggel Rivas =

Honduran lawyer and judge (1954–2015)

José Eduardo Gauggel Rivas (2 January 1954, in Santa Rosa de Copán – 10 April 2015, in San Pedro Sula) was a Honduran lawyer and politician who served as a member of the Supreme Court of Honduras from 1994 to 1998. He was the father of Eduardo Gauggel Medina, also a politician, who died alongside him in the same shooting.
