= Wilfred Brown (cricketer) =

Australian cricketer

Personal information
- Born: 21 March 1930; Warwick, Queensland, Australia
- Died: 25 April 2015 (aged 85); Warwick, Queensland, Australia
- Source: Cricinfo, 25 March 2016

Wilfred Brown (21 March 1930 – 25 April 2015) was an Australian cricketer. He played two first-class matches for Queensland in 1952/53.
