= Maria Luisa Poumaillou =

Maria Luisa Poumaillou (c. 1953 – April 7, 2015) was a French buyer known for her Paris boutiques named "Maria Luisa". Although the boutique closed in 2010, the brand has been continued as an online shop, and Poumaillou became a fashion consultant for the Paris department store Printemps. She died on April 7, 2015, after a long illness.

== Biography ==
Maria Luisa Poumaillou was born in Venezuela and emigrated to Paris with her parents when she was 7. Her education includes political science in Paris and a literature degree in Madrid.

Poumaillou opened her first boutique with her husband Daniel in 1988, in rue Cambon in Paris.

With no previous experience in buying, she placed her first orders with designers she had admired in fashion magazines. Based on Poumaillou's opinionated choices among independent designers, her salon carried a unique mix of choices often not seen elsewhere, making it popular with Parisians and international shoppers.

"Maria Luisa" has offered a selection of renowned designers such as Alexander McQueen, Martin Margiela, Helmut Lang, Nicolas Ghesquière, Rick Owens, Haider Ackermann, Christopher Kane and Riccardo Tisci.

In 2010, Poumaillou closed the "Maria Luisa" boutique and moved to an online retailing model. She took a consultancy at Printemps where she sold her brand of fashion choice.
