= Canaccord Genuity =

Canadian financial company

Canaccord Genuity Group Inc.
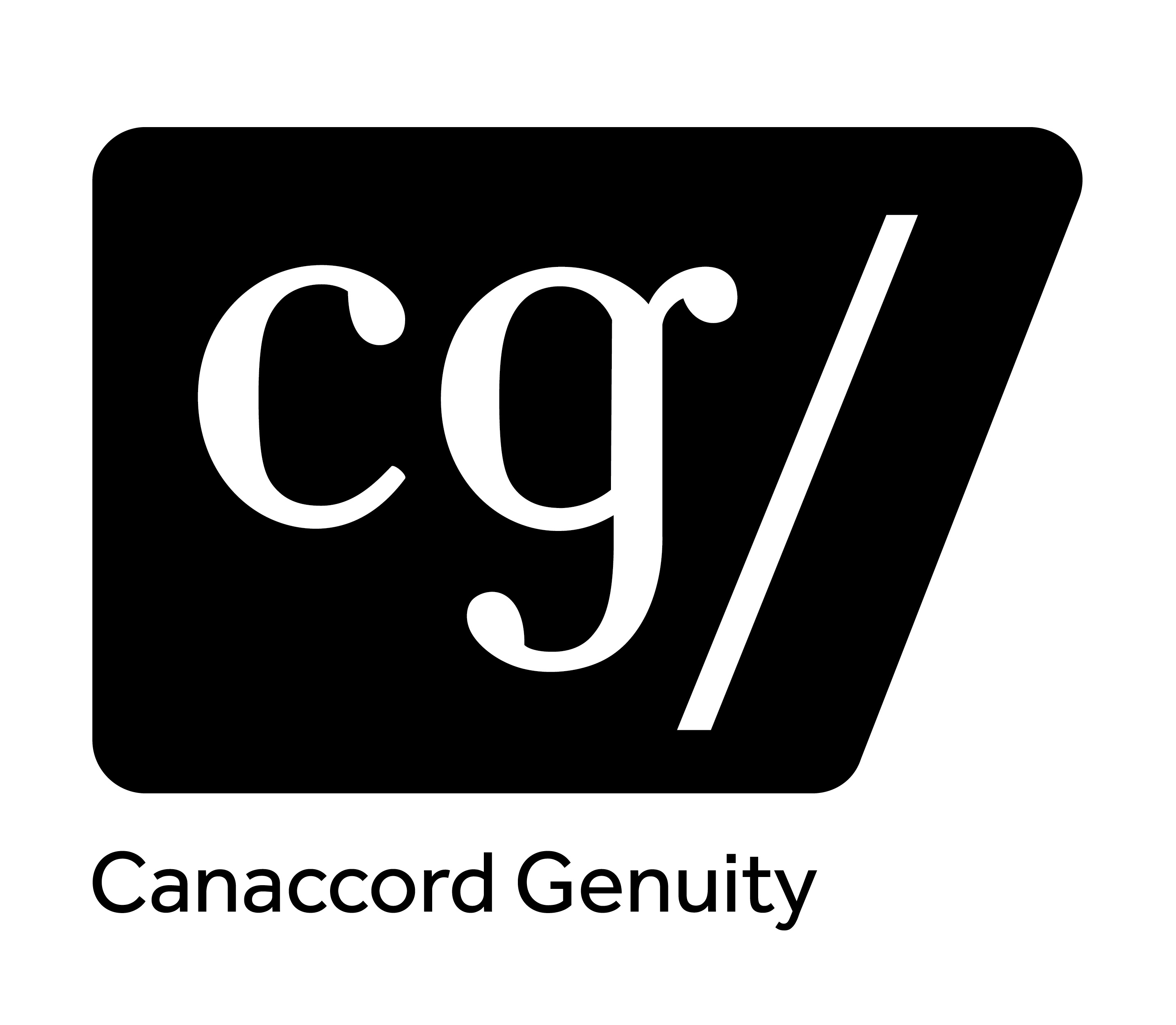
- Type: Public
- Traded as: TSX: CF
- Industry: Financial services
- Founded: 1950; 76 years ago
- Founder: Peter Brown
- Headquarters: Vancouver, Canada
- Area served: North America, UK & Europe, Asia and Australia
- Key people: Daniel Daviau (CEO)
- Services: Investment banking Private banking Wealth management
- Revenue: ▲ C$1.8 billion (2025)
- Net income: ▼ C$25 million (2025)
- AUM: ▲ C$120.4 billion (2025)
- Total assets: ▲ C$6.7 billion (2025)
- Total equity: ▼ C$1.0 billion (2025)
- Number of employees: 2,925 (2025)
- Divisions: Wealth Management; Global Capital Markets
- Website: cgf.com

Canaccord Genuity Group Inc. is an investment banking and financial services company that specializes in wealth management and brokerage in capital markets. It is one of the largest independent investment dealers in Canada. The firm focuses on growth companies, with operations in 10 countries. Canaccord Genuity, the international capital markets division, is based in Canada, with offices in the US, the UK, Europe, Asia, and Australia.

Canaccord Genuity provides mergers and acquisitions, corporate finance, restructuring, debt advisory, and strategic advice for corporate, government, and private-equity clients. The firm's practice areas include aerospace and defense, agriculture, clean technology and sustainability, consumer and retail, energy, financials, health care and life sciences, infrastructure, leisure, media and telecommunications, metals and mining, real estate and hospitality, technology, transportation, and private equity.

== History ==
=== 1950 Hemsworth, Turton & Co. Founded ===
The company was established in 1950 as Hemsworth, Turton & Co., a Western Canadian venture capital firm.

=== IPO, M&A, and 2009 rebranding ===
In 2004, Canaccord Capital went public on the Toronto Stock Exchange with an IPO price of $10.25 and an estimated valuation of $70 million.

In 2006, Canaccord Capital acquired Adams, Harkness & Hill Financial Group Inc., a Boston-based broker-dealer. The firm's global capital markets division was rebranded as Canaccord Adams.

In 2009, Canaccord Capital was renamed Canaccord Financial. Canaccord Financial acquired Genuity Capital Markets in 2010, in a cash and share deal worth about $286 million. Genuity Capital Markets, founded in 2005, had 135 employees with offices in Canada and the U.S.

=== UK Expansion through Acquisition ===
In 2012, Canaccord Financial acquired Collins Stewart Hawkpoint for $400m acquiring "an independent financial advisory firm with research, trading and wealth management operations".

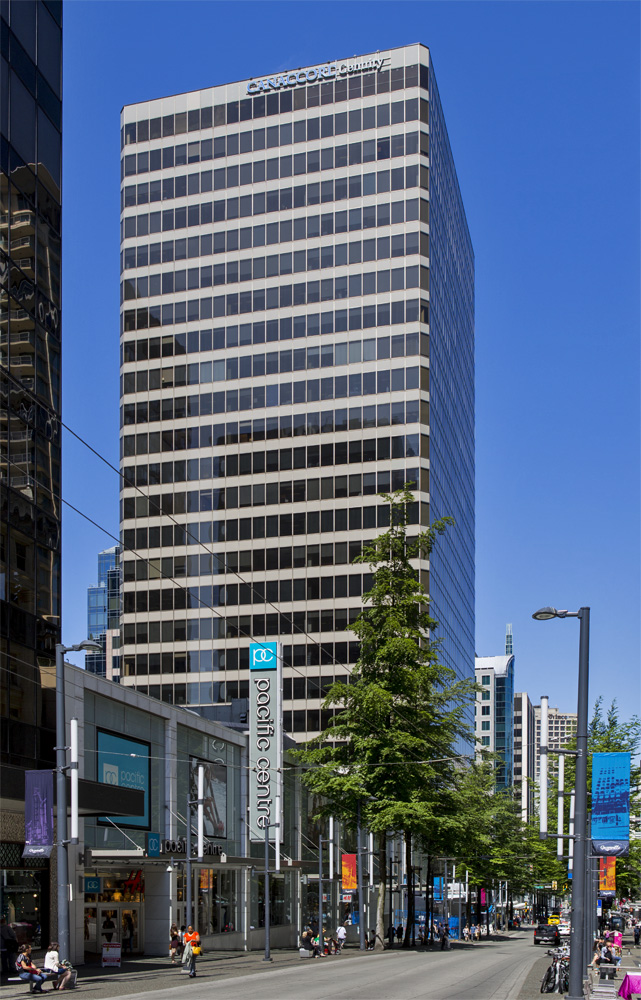
Canaccord Tower in downtown Vancouver

In 2012, Canaccord Financial acquired Eden Financial, a London-based wealth management business for private client investment management.

2013 Canaccord Financial rebranded its global wealth management division to Canaccord Genuity Wealth Management. and acquired Hargreave Hale Ltd the next year. It acquired Petsky Prunier and Patersons Securities Limited in 2019.

In 2019 Canaccord Genuity acquired Petsky Prunier.

In 2021 Canaccord Genuity acquired the investment management business of Adam & Company from the Royal Bank of Scotland for $94.9 million.

In 2021 Canaccord Genuity acquired Sawaya Partners a New York City-based boutique investment bank specializing in consumer and retail. In 2022, Canaccord Genuity acquired Punter Southall Wealth Limited

In 2026 Canaccord Genuity acquired CRC-IB.

== Business divisions ==
The two units of Canaccord Genuity are wealth management and global capital markets, serving corporate and institutional clients.

=== Canaccord Genuity Wealth Management ===
Canaccord Genuity Wealth Management's total client assets amounted to $96.2 billion in Canada, the UK & Europe, and Australia on March 31, 2023. In April 2016, Canaccord Genuity Wealth Management announced a strategic partnership with Credit Suisse Asset Management (CSAM).

==== Transactions History ====
Transactions have included advising Amaya Gaming Group in its $4.9 billion acquisition of PokerStars and Full Tilt Poker, advising Yamana Gold's $3.9 billion joint acquisition with Agnico Eagle of Osisko Mining, advising Primaris REIT's hostile defense and $5.0 billion sale to H&R REIT and KingSett Capital led consortium, advising Viterra's $6.1 billion sale to Glencore, and advising the $2.2 billion cross-border sale of Daylight Energy to Sinopec, a unit of China Petrochemical Corp. It has also advised on GLENTEL's $670 million sale to Bell Canada in 2014, and the sale of Canada Goose to Bain Capital. In 2012, it advised on Extorre Gold Mines' $404 million sale to Yamana Gold.

In 2013, the Canaccord Genuity team put together a consortium of major investors, including Schroders and Threadneedle Investments, in participating in a takeover bid proposal for 316 bank branches of the Royal Bank of Scotland (RBS). Two buyout firms, Apollo Management and JC Flowers, also submitted a joint offer. In 2011, the firm advised the $3.2 billion sale of Converteam from Barclays Private Equity and LBO France to General Electric, growing the GE Power Conversion business. In the same year, Canaccord Genuity also advised the Bank of Ireland on the disposal of a c.£1.3bn UK commercial real-estate loan book to California-based Kennedy Wilson and institutional partners for consideration of c.£1.07bn, over 80% of par value despite both the poor UK commercial real estate and lending market conditions at the time. In 2025, Canaccord advised dentalcorp on its C$3.2 billion acquisition by American private equity firm GTCR.

== Leadership ==
Dan Daviau is CEO and chairman since June 2024.

Previously, Canaccord CEO Paul Reynolds died after falling ill during a triathlonCanadian financial services firm Canaccord Genuity said Chief Executive Paul Reynolds had died, three days after becoming ill while competing in a triathlon in Hawaii. The 52-year old, who has led the company since August 2007, will be replaced by Chairman David Kassie, Canaccord said in a statement on Thursday. Reynolds was competing in the Lavaman Waikoloa Triathlon on Sunday when he got into trouble during the swim portion of the race, the Globe and Mail said, citing a local news report. Canaccord said on Monday that Reynolds had been hospitalized following a medical emergency and that Kassie would be interim CEO while Reynolds recovered.

Daviau and Kassie joined Canaccord, which was founded in 1950, when Canaccord merged with their firm, Genuity, in 2010. The board overhaul will see the departure of several key members. Former executive David Kassie will step down as chair, a move announced last year. Additionally, former Ontario Finance Minister Rod Phillips, along with directors Jo-Anne O’Connor and Amy Freedman, will not seek reelection. Despite these changes, Phillips will remain with the firm as vice-chair of its Canadian broker-dealer. Joining the restructured board are Shannon Eusey and Cindy Tripp. Eusey, with extensive experience in wealth management, and Tripp, a capital markets expert, are expected to bring valuable insights and expertise. Their appointments are seen as a strategic move to strengthen the board’s capabilities in these critical areas.

== Abandoned $1.1-billion buyout ==
A management group at Canaccord Genuity Group Inc. that included the chief executive and chairman has given up a bid to privatize the independent investment dealer after failing to win enough shares and regulatory approval to satisfy their $1.1-billion offer. The $11.25 a share bid was initially contested by a special committee of the board, which contended in February that Canaccord was being significantly undervalued by the management group.

The special committee obtained an independent valuation from RBC Capital Markets that valued Canaccord between $12.75 to $15.75 a share, or as much as 40 per cent more than the offer. However, those board members resigned citing an “irreparable” relationship with the management group that included chief executive Dan Daviau and chairman David Kassie. The special committee was replaced by new members more supportive of the management-led privatization bid.

In May, Canaccord said the bid, set to expire June 13, had been snagged by a regulatory issue with one of the firm’s foreign subsidiaries. On June 5, Canaccord’s board, after consulting with the special committee and the company’s lawyers, recommended that shareholders reject the privatization bid and not tender their shares because the conditions of the offer were not expected to be satisfied. Then, on June 14, it was announced that the bid was expiring without regulatory approval or sufficient support, and it was not being renewed.

Article content The company and the management group have now entered into an agreement that includes a two-year standstill with support commitments from certain members of management to vote in favour of board-supported director nominees.

== Securities Fraud-Related Bank Secrecy Act Violations and Monetary Penalties ==
On March 6, 2026, the United States Department of the Treasury’s Financial Crimes Enforcement Network (FinCEN) assessed an $80,000,000 civil money penalty against Canaccord Genuity LLC, the U.S. Broker / Dealer of Canaccord Genuity, "for willful violations of the Bank Secrecy Act (BSA), the primary U.S. anti-money laundering and countering the financing of terrorism law that safeguards the financial system from illicit use". This is the largest penalty ever imposed against a broker-dealer for violating the BSA.

At the same time, "The Securities and Exchange Commission (“Commission”) deems it appropriate and in the public interest that public administrative and cease-and-desist proceedings be, and hereby are, instituted pursuant to Sections 15(b) and 21C of the Securities Exchange Act of 1934 (“Exchange Act”) against Canaccord Genuity LLC". Additionally, "Canaccord Genuity LLC has consented to a census and a 20 million dollar fine following an investigation into systemic deficiencies within its anti-money laundering protocols and supervisory frameworks. The Financial Industry Regulatory Authority (FINRA) determined that the firm failed to maintain a program reasonably designed to achieve compliance with the Bank Secrecy Act over a period spanning nearly a decade."

According to The Globe and Mail, "Canaccord’s U.S. division conducted trades for scammers and a fixer for Russian oligarchs", and as a result, Canaccord's U.S. CEO resigned.

In 2025, Canaccord Genuity received continued membership with FINRA notwithstanding its statutory disqualification.

Canaccord had previously been fined for supervisory failures with Private Placement Investments and for failing to supervise off channel communications.
