= Serhii Ivanov =

Ukrainian political blogger (born 1976)

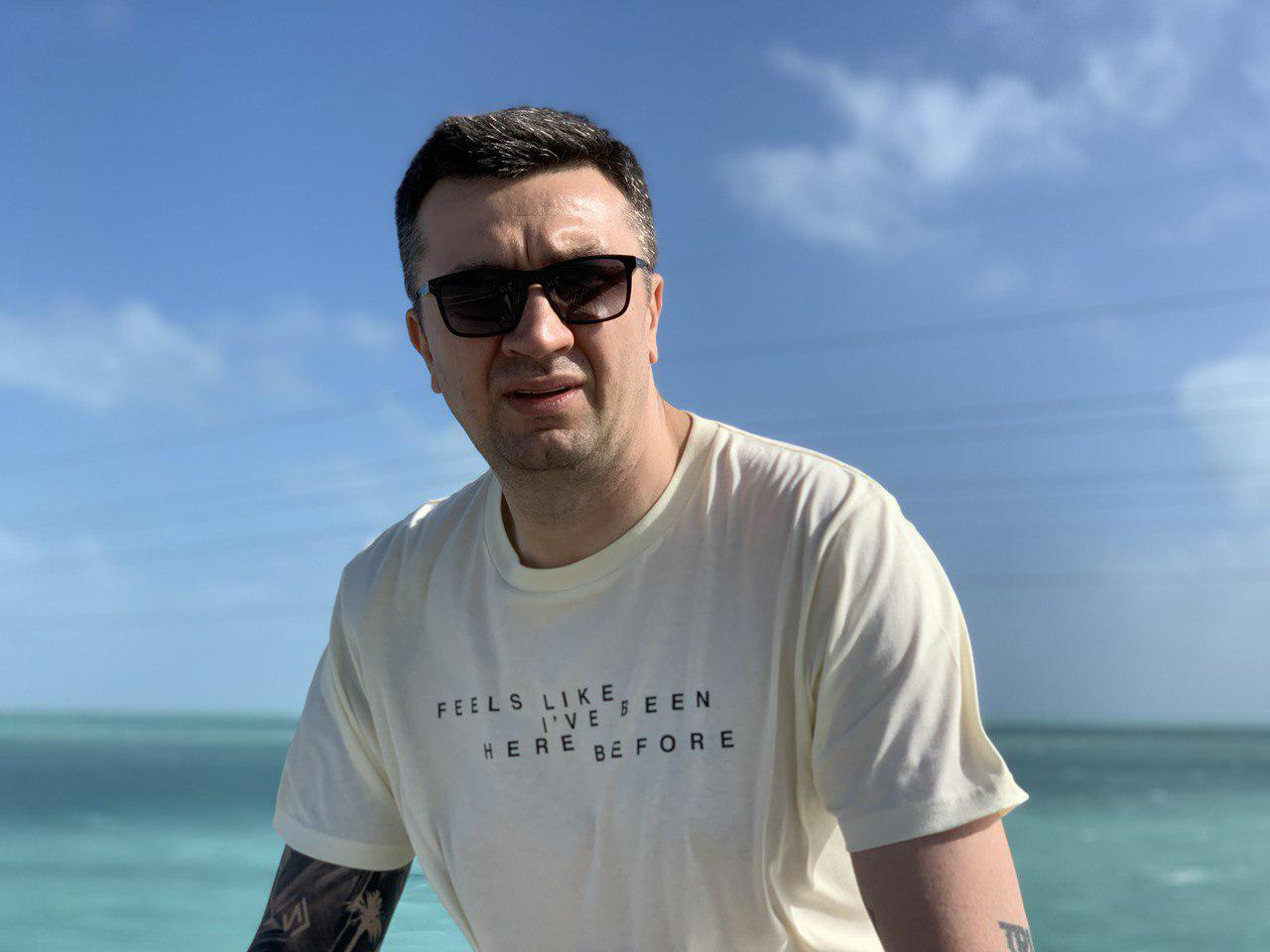
- Ivanov in 2020
- Born: August 26, 1976 (age 50); Zimogorye, Voroshilovgrad Oblast, Ukrainian SSR, Soviet Union
- Occupations: Campaign manager; former prosecutor; television presenter; publicist; writer

Serhii Volodymyrovych Ivanov (Ukrainian: Сергій Володимирович Іванов; born 26 August 1976) is a Ukrainian campaign manager, former prosecutor, television presenter, publicist and writer. He is the host of the ISLND TV channel, founded by pro-Russian propagandist and campaign manager Volodymyr Petrov.

He is the son of Volodymyr Ivanov, a former Ukrainian MP from the pro-Russian Party of Regions.

A number of Ukrainian media, journalists and politicians call Ivanov a "campaign manager" and a "media killer", and describe his activities as "political advertorial".

== Early life ==
He was born on 26 August 1976 in the Luhansk Oblast of the Ukrainian SSR.

Serhii Ivanov's father is Volodymyr Mykhailovych Ivanov. He was born in Russia, in the village of Elgen, Magadan Oblast. From 1998 to 2006, he was a deputy of the Luhansk Oblast Council, followed by party work. In 2006–2007, he was a member of the Verkhovna Rada of the V convocation from the pro-Russian Party of Regions. For many years, he served as deputy head of the Luhansk Regional State Administration, in particular during the period when the RSA was headed by pro-Russian politician Oleksandr Yefremov, who fled to Russia and is accused of treason by the Security Service of Ukraine. The media estimated the wealth of Serhii Ivanov's father at $55 million and considered him one of the richest people in Luhansk Oblast. Ivanov himself, however, denies that his parents were rich.

== Education ==
In 1998, he graduated from East Ukrainian National University with a degree in law. He qualified as a lawyer.

== Career ==
In 2008, he was dismissed from the post of prosecutor in Luhansk Oblast for alcoholism, and after Viktor Yanukovych won the election in 2010, he became a deputy department head at the Main Department of the Ministry of Revenues and Duties in Luhansk Oblast, where he controlled the circulation of excisable goods, such as alcohol and tobacco.

== Media activities ==
From May 2014 to November 2015, he worked with the publication Ukrainska Pravda.

Since December 2014, he has been working with the online publication Censor.net as a journalist and blogger. He has written articles for various media outlets, including: Focus, Liga.net.

Since 2016, he has participated in the broadcasts of Roman Skrypin's author project, skrypin.ua and UMN. In early September 2016, he headed the Espreso TV portal.

From the beginning of October 2016 to July 2019, Ivanov, together with Nataliia Moseichuk, hosted the talk show Right to Power on 1+1 TV channel. Since autumn 2019, he has been hosting his own programme Antipodes. The programme is broadcast on the Iceland TV channel and the ISLND TV YouTube channel.

== Advertorial ==
In 2020, Serhii Ivanov released a documentary called The Battle for Irpin about the former mayor of Irpin, Volodymyr Karpliuk.

The Detector Media publication and the editor-in-chief of the Chesno civic movement website, Iryna Fedoriv, called Serhii Ivanov's film an example of "what a political advertorial can look like." Former Prosecutor General Yuriy Lutsenko and MP of the 8th convocation Olha Chervakova also commented on certain episodes of the film. Although Karpliuk criticises them in the film, the author of the film did not present their point of view on the events.

== Cooperation with Kyrylo Tymoshenko ==
In November 2020, Mykhailo Podolyak, an adviser to the head of the Presidential Office, said that Ivanov was working for the Office of the President of Ukraine Volodymyr Zelenskyy in a group of bloggers who spread information about positive policy trends on social media. Serhii Ivanov himself denied this.

According to sources of Babel media in the Office of the President of Ukraine, Serhii Ivanov worked with former Deputy Head of the Presidential Office Kyrylo Tymoshenko. When asked by Babel when Ivanov and Petrov stopped working with the Presidential Office, a source in the Office said that "they were both brought in by the former deputy head of the Presidential Office, Kyrylo Tymoshenko. They left with him".

On 15 December 2021, together with Volodymyr Petrov and former hosts of Viktor Medvedchuk's closed pro-Russian TV channels, Ivanov started working as a host on the renewed Rada TV channel. However, after several high-profile on-air scandals, Petrov was suspended from broadcasting. Ivanov worked at the channel for a short time, but he was also fired later. According to an investigation by Bihus.Info journalists, a company associated with Kyrylo Tymoshenko was responsible for the financial support of the renewed Rada TV channel. It received tens of millions of hryvnias from the state budget for PR of representatives of the Presidential Office, and according to Bihus.Info's analysis, Tymoshenko was the one who was shown on the air the most.

On 16 January 2024, Servant of the People MP Maryana Bezuhla said that the Card Office Telegram channel, which was the first to spread information about the provocation near the apartment of investigative journalist Yuriy Nikolov, was run by Serhii Ivanov together with Volodymyr Petrov. Earlier, the Detector Media portal wrote that the Card Office was linked to Kyrylo Tymoshenko.

== Scandals ==
On 15 April 2021, on the air of the Ivanov Live programme on the ISLND TV, Ivanov described how activists on social media condemn opinion leaders who come to his show. He focused on the personality of activist Mykola Vyhovskyi, co-founder of the Euromaidan Public Sector, the Reanimation Package of Reforms Coalition, and former coordinator of the Chesno civic movement. Ivanov said that, according to the open data portal Opendatabot, Vyhovskyi was allegedly entered into the register of the Ministry of Justice as a child support debtor. But Mykola Vyhovskyi never married and had no children. Ivanov explained his position to the Detector Media portal. He did not deny that he could have made a mistake, adding that Vyhovskyi was to blame because he was a guest on Ivanov's programme. Ivanov also stated that he was not going to apologise for slandering Vyhovskyi.

On 7 September 2023, in his investigation into Danylo Hetmantsev, Serhii Ivanov claimed that Ukrainian journalists Serhiy Rudenko, Vitaly Portnikov and Myroslava Barchuk were involved in the poisoning of the third president of Ukraine, Viktor Yushchenko. An infographic titled "FSB agents — participants in the poisoning of Yushchenko" was shown in the first minutes of the story about Hetmantsev. When this infographic is shown on the screen, Ivanov talks about "media groups of oligarchs and collaborators who are wanted, whose TV channels have either been deprived of their broadcasting licences or have been thrown out of the information space for anti-Ukrainian activities". Ivanov claims that these media groups are part of Hetmantsev's "business conglomerate".

Ivanov's accusation of Viktor Yushchenko's poisoning of Ukrainian journalists caused a stir in the media community. Olha Len, a journalist of the Espreso TV channel, reminded that "the channel did not exist in 2004", and Ivanov, who used to work in the Espreso editorial office, "could have known this". The journalist also noticed that at the same time as Ivanov, pro-Russian TV presenter Diana Panchenko, who is suspected by the Security Service of Ukraine of justifying Russia's armed aggression against Ukraine, mentioned Yushchenko. MP Volodymyr Ariev said that in 2004, when he worked in the Ukrainian media, he conducted a journalistic investigation into the poisoning of Yushchenko. "I collaborated with Christiane Amanpour, who made a story for the 60 Minutes programme. So I will say simply: everything Ivanov said has nothing to do with reality," Ariev added. MP Oleksiy Honcharenko compared Ivanov's work to the way Nazi ideologues acted.

During 2023–2024, in co-authorship with Volodymyr Petrov, on the ISLND TV, Serhii Ivanov repeatedly made negative comments about Masha Efrosinina and the singer Alyona Alyona and humiliated them. Alyona Alyona responded to Petrov and Ivanov's statements on Instagram. She reminded that this was not the first public insult they had made against her. Masha Efrosinina also reacted to the Alyona Alyona scandal, saying that she was "perhaps the very first woman they started upholstering their misogynistic narratives". He adds that she "never drew attention to it". "For me, they are just like a street garbage can that I pass by every morning without turning my head," Efrosinina said.

== Political views ==
After the start of the War in Donbas and after he moving from Luhansk to Kyiv, Ivanov refused to help Ukrainian security forces prosecute Luhansk separatists because "it was not profitable for him". This information was confirmed by the executive director of the Myrotvorets, Roman Zaitsev. In a conversation with Zaitsev, Ivanov said that "if he provides information about the separatists he knows, he will not be able to write about them in his own newspaper, which means that it is not profitable for him, especially since he is doing it to find a job". The director of the Myrotvorets also added that Ivanov said that he refused to work even with the Security Service of Ukraine if they asked him to. Moreover, even when asked to clarify the information, Ivanov categorically refused.

In 2014, Ivanov criticised Svoboda party member Iryna Farion. He stated that Russia used Farion to aggravate the situation in Donbas by provoking the language issue. But, in 2021, Ivanov changed his attitude towards Farion and recorded a complimentary interview with her.

== Criticism ==
A number of Ukrainian media outlets, journalists and politicians call Ivanov a "campaign manager" and a "media killer", and describe his activities as "political advertorial".

The NGO Stop Corruption calls Ivanov a "pro-Russian blogger".

The online media Babel notes that Serhii Ivanov uses "incriminating signs" in his stories "instead of facts". The journalist and editor-in-chief of Babel, Kateryna Kobernyk, ironically emphasises that "in an investigation about Serhii Ivanov, if it were made by Serhii Ivanov, Andy Warhol appears. Don't ask why - it's obvious."

Journalist of Pershyi Myroslava Barchuk called one of Ivanov's stories, which received almost a quarter of a million views on YouTube, "an order from one government official against another", and called Ivanov himself an "information killer".

MP and journalist Volodymyr Ariev calls Ivanov's activities "fierce, lying propaganda of the 'Poroshenko-killed-his-brother' level".

Natalia Lygachova, editor-in-chief of the Detector Media portal, called Serhii Ivanov and Volodymyr Petrov "campaign manager".

Ukrainian journalist Dmytro Gordon calls Sergei Ivanov "the closest ally and friend" of pro-Russian propagandist Volodymyr Petrov. According to Gordon, Ivanov and Petrov are "media killers working for Russia", and compares their activities to those of pro-Russian blogger Anatoly Shariy, who is suspected of treason. "I would very much like the public to see a meeting between Shariy, Petrov and Ivanov in a pre-trial detention centre. I would like them to meet face-to-face and tell us what kind of money they received from the Kremlin," Gordon said. On 26 February 2024, Dmytro Gordon published an extensive investigation into the activities of Serhii Ivanov and Volodymyr Petrov. According to Gordon, "after this investigation, the Security Service of Ukraine will deal with Petrov and Ivanov".

According to Olesia Batsman, editor-in-chief of the Gordon online publication and journalist, if we forgive Ivanov and Petrov for their media activities, "we will wake up in a society where such media freaks will raise media freaks-necrophiles like themselves".

According to MP and politician Oleksiy Honcharenko, "the fact that Petrov and Ivanov are at large is a failure of law enforcement agencies". Following the publication of the investigation by journalist Dmytro Gordon, Oleksiy Honcharenko filed a deputy appeal asking the Security Service of Ukraine to provide a legal assessment of the bloggers' actions outlined in the investigation and "do everything necessary to stop their anti-Ukrainian activities".
