= Volodymyr Petrov =

Ukrainian political blogger (born 1977)

- Володимир Петров
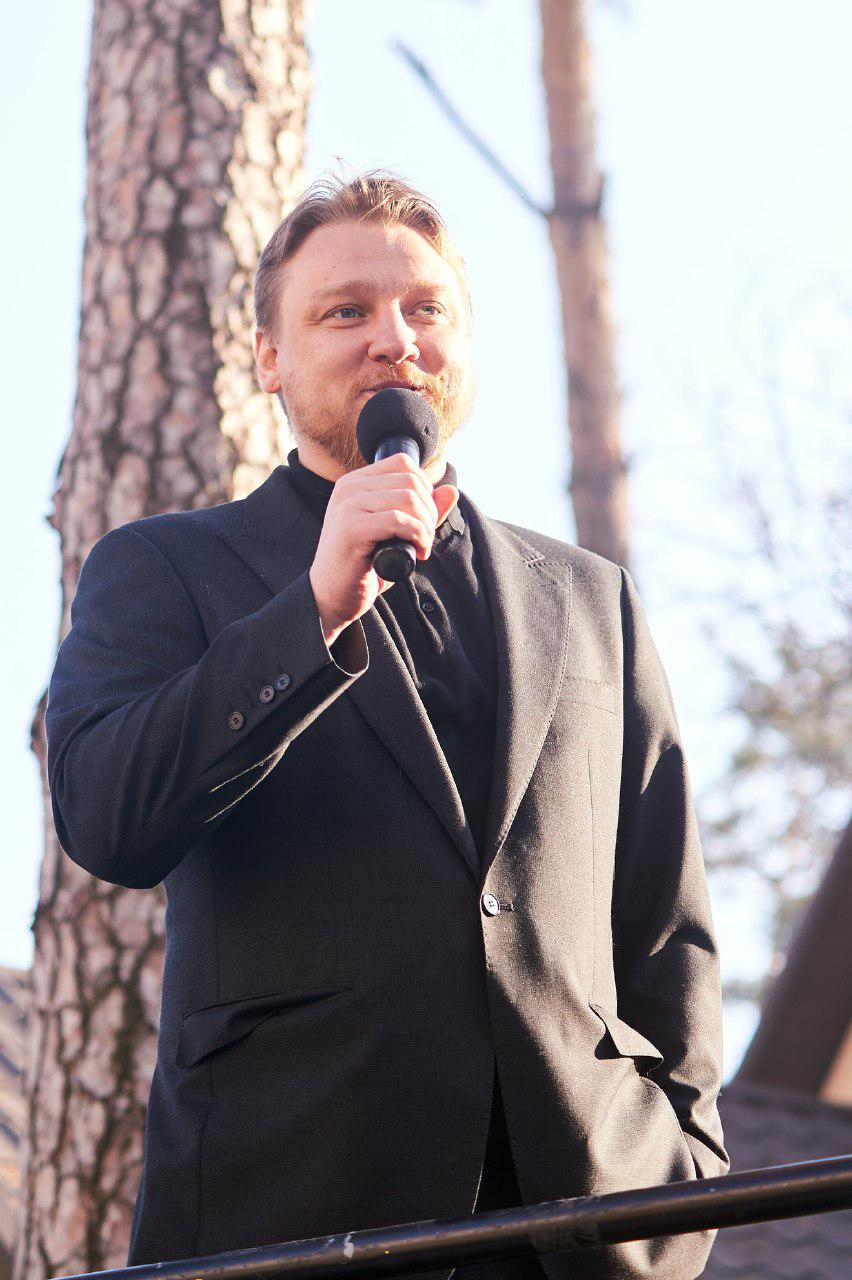
- Petrov in 2019
- Born: November 20, 1977 (age 48); Dnipropetrovsk, Ukrainian SSR, Soviet Union
- Occupations: Campaign manager; propagandist; producer; blogger

Volodymyr Volodymyrovych Petrov (Ukrainian: Володимир Володимирович Петров; born. 20 November 1977) is a Ukrainian pro-Russian propagandist, campaign manager, producer, and blogger.

He is known for being the author of the pedophilegate at Artek, which helped pro-Russian candidate Viktor Yanukovych win the 2010 Ukrainian presidential election.

He managed the election campaign of Ihor Markov, a pro-Russian politician wanted by the Security Service of Ukraine, which resulted in Markov's election to the Verkhovna Rada. He worked for the campaign of candidate Mikhail Prokhorov during the 2012 Russian presidential election.

He is best known for creating the titushky in 2013, whose provocations and clashes led to the Maidan casualties, Yanukovych's escape and Russia's annexation of Crimea.

He was a candidate for the 2019 Ukrainian presidential election.

He is the founder and host of the YouTube channel ISLND TV. On 15 December 2021, he became the host of the Rada TV channel, on 17 December he was scandalously suspended from the airwaves.

He is known for his anti-Ukrainian statements, particularly about the Euromaidan, the Ukrainian language; derogatory remarks about the Ukrainian military, Ukrainian refugees. He declared that he did not consider Crimea to be Ukrainian. He spread Russian propaganda, as well as lies and fakes about the Russo-Ukrainian war on his airwaves. A number of Ukrainian media outlets, journalists and politicians have called Petrov a "campaign manager" and "media killer", and his activities have been characterised as "pro-Russian", "anti-Ukrainian" and "propagandistic".

== Early life ==
Volodymyr Petrov was born in 1977 in Dnipropetrovsk.

His parents are Lyubov Volodymyrivna Petrova, a native of the city of Salavat in the Russian Federation, and Volodymyr Rudolfovych Petrov, a native of the city of Petropavl in the Kazakh SSR, a Russian, former military man. They divorced when Petrov was six years old. After the dissolution of the Soviet Union, Petrov's father went to live in Russia.

== Education ==
He graduated from Kryvyi Rih National University with a degree in mining engineering.

== Career ==
In 2002, he was a journalist for Vulychne Telebachennya, a project of Victor Pinchuk that played an important role in campaigning and manipulating in favour of Leonid Kuchma in the early 2000s.

Petrov then moved to work for the pro-Russian, now closed, KRT TV channel, where he rose to the level of editor-in-chief and director. KRT was owned by Donetsk prosecutor and Prosecutor General Hennadiy Vasilyev.

He became famous thanks to his LiveJournal blog, which he maintained since the 2000s under the pseudonym Lumpen. In the public political space, Volodymyr Petrov's name loudly surfaced in the summer of 2009 because of the scandal with Arseniy Yatsenyuk's LiveJournal. On Petrov's LiveJournal page, an obscene comment on behalf of Yatsenyuk appeared in the name of Yatsenyuk to one of the users. Later Petrov explained that he forgot to re-login.

In 2010, Petrov registered B&D News Agency.

== 2012 Russian presidential election ==
Volodymyr Petrov campaigned during the 2012 Russian presidential election as a campaign manager for Russian oligarch Mikhail Prokhorov.

According to various estimates, Prokhorov participated in the election as a technical candidate. Sergey Mironov, chairman of the Just Russia party and another Russian presidential candidate, has openly stated that Putin and Prokhorov had "essentially the same headquarters." In fact, Prokhorov was a political technician.

According to an investigation by journalist Dmytro Gordon, Petrov's work in this presidential campaign was supervised directly by the Fifth Department of the Russian Federal Security Service (officially known as the Service for Operational Information and International Relations); Prokhorov's PR was also organised by Timofey Sergeitsev, one of the ideologists of Rashism and author of the scandalous article What Russia Should Do with Ukraine, Russian political technologist Dmitry Kulikov, and Iskander Valitov, a political technologist with experience of campaigns in Ukraine.

Petrov received approximately $1.5 million for his work for Prokhorov, and it was with this money that he then bought a house in Bucha. In February 2020, he transferred the house, which has an area of almost 250 m^{2}, to his wife through a deed of gift.

In 2012, when he was working with Prokhorov on the Federal Security Service's behalf during the election, Petrov "joked" that he would soon be promoted to colonel. He lived in Moscow for months.

== Cooperation with the Yanukovych regime ==
During the presidency of Viktor Yanukovych, Petrov's company worked for Presidential Administration. In 2009–2013, he was active against Yulia Tymoshenko and the united opposition.

During the 2009–2010 presidential campaign, Petrov was the author of the pedophilegate, when three MPs from the Yulia Tymoshenko Bloc, Viktor Ukolov, Serhiy Teryokhin and Ruslan Bogdan, were accused of allegedly sexually abusing children in the Artek camp. Volodymyr Petrov's public involvement was manifested in the fact that he helped to spread the story through his blog. On 13 October 2009, on his LiveJournal, he published a letter from MP Hryhoriy Omelchenko to President Viktor Yushchenko. On the same day, 13 October, Vadym Kolesnichenko, a member of the Party of Regions, also spoke about the Artek scandal. This was the impetus for the consideration of the "pedophile case", with the three accused MPs demanding that all checks be carried out. At the time, the MPs categorically denied this information. The consultant in the case of the "injured party" was, among others, a lawyer and pro-Russian propagandist Tetiana Montyan. She, like Petrov, was actively involved in the promotion of the pedophilegate.

In October 2011, the falsified case against three MPs from the Yulia Tymoshenko Bloc was closed.

One of Petrov's clients in the 'pedophile case' was pro-Russian politician Volodymyr Sivkovich, who is suspected of treason for creating a network of Russian agents in Ukraine. Serhiy Teryokhin said in an interview with Dmitry Gordon that he was involved in the promotion of the pedophilegate. At the time, Sivkovych was an MP from the Party of Regions, and after Yanukovych's victory, he became deputy prime minister, in charge of the security forces in Mykola Azarov's government. Petrov's second client in the case of alleged pedophilia at Artek is Volodymyr Oliynyk, a pro-Russian politician and former MP from the Party of Regions who also fled to Russia and was suspected of treason by the Security Service of Ukraine. According to an investigation by journalist Dmytro Gordon, Sivkovich and Oliynyk were the main coordinators of the paedophile case, and it was from them that Petrov received money for promoting the scandal. In an interview with Ukrainian blogger Lilia Bagirova, Volodymyr Petrov said that the story of the "pedophiles" helped to "bring down" Yulia Tymoshenko in the second round, she lost to Viktor Yanukovych by less than 3.5 percentage points.

During the Yanukovych presidency, actions against the opposition were the leitmotif of Petrov's public actions. One of the most notable victims was his former employer, Arseniy Yatsenyuk.

In 2012, Petrov helped the leader of the now banned pro-Russian party Rodina, Ihor Markov, who was then one of the main Ukrainophobes, according to The Ukrainian Week, to get into the Verkhovna Rada. He is currently hiding in Russia and is suspected of crimes against national security, and is a supporter and sponsor of the DPR and LPR terrorist groups. Petrov was inventing everything for Markov's campaign, and Russian campaign manager Semyon Uralov worked with him. Now Uralov is discussing on air with DPR terrorist Denis Pushilin, Russian World ideologue Aleksandr Dugin and Deputy Chairman of the Federation Council Konstantin Kosachev about how to "denazify" Ukraine. Markov won the election. The technical candidate Petrov received 525 votes. According to Oleksiy Honcharenko, an MP from the European Solidarity party, Markov spent millions of dollars on his campaign, including a performance by Russian singer Lev Leshchenko at his 9 May event. After Markov's election victory, Petrov began to work more actively in Kyiv, with Alexei Sitnikov, a Russian campaign manager, as his supervisor.

Between the elections, Petrov worked against journalists opposed to Yanukovych. While media professionals were fighting for freedom of speech, the political strategist opposed the Stop Censorship movement. In particular, he publicly promised to make every effort to ensure that the "journalistic party" that remained after the Revolution on Granite disappeared from Ukraine. Petrov's campaign against Dzerkalo Tyzhnia was the most notable.

Vladimir Petrov introduced the use of titushky into the practice of political technology. On 18 May 2013, the then Minister of Internal Affairs Vitaliy Zakharchenko and Petrov's team started a fight at the opposition rally Rise up, Ukraine! attended by several thousand people. Accompanied by the traffic police, an armoured vehicle with clowns inside and on the armour, provided by Volodymyr Petrov, began to ram those who had come to Sophia Square and the surrounding streets against the Yanukovych regime. The vehicle provoked a fight, during which activists and journalists were attacked by hired thugs, one of whom was Vadym Titushko. It was on that day that the word titushky was born. At first, Volodymyr Petrov admitted that he had rented a car for the action. But now he denies any involvement because of a potential criminal case. At the time, Serhiy Lyovochkin was the head of President Yanukovych's administration. Petrov only admitted to working with him at the end of 2018, after his arrest.

After Vadym Titushko beat up journalists, the Maidan began to use the following tactic on a massive scale: they launched titushky, who were invented and brought to the Maidan by Volodymyr Petrov in 2013. The provocations and clashes were meant to stir up the situation as much as possible. All of this subsequently led to the Maidan casualties, Yanukovych's escape, Russia's annexation of Crimea and the war in Donbas.

== Post-Euromaidan activities ==
In the autumn of 2014, after the outbreak of the Russo-Ukrainian war, Petrov helped pro-Russian politician Serhii Kivalov get into the Verkhovna Rada in the early parliamentary elections in Odesa. At that time, Kivalov won his constituency by a slim margin due to two things: the total control of the District Election Commission and the fact that a lot of technical candidates, including Petrov's associates Oleksandr Baraboshko and Oleksiy Durnev, were running against his competitors. In total, 40 people were running in the 135th constituency at the time.

On 6 September 2015, NLO TV premiered the Lumpen Show, an information and entertainment project in which Volodymyr Petrov promoted anti-Ukrainian narratives and hosted broadcasts with openly pro-Russian persons.

In 2016, he hosted the Dangerous Tour programme on the Russian federal TV channel Friday! together with TV presenter Zhanna Badoeva, who is under National Security and Defense Council of Ukraine sanctions for anti-Ukrainian activities.

== Television channel ==
One of Petrov's projects is the ISLND TV YouTube channel, which was launched in spring 2018 and publishes several programmes on politics, science and culture.

According to the website of the National Council of Television and Radio Broadcasting, ISLND TV was granted a broadcasting licence in 2019, and is owned by political strategist Volodymyr Petrov (he owns 94% of the share capital, with another 3% each held by the channel's co-founders, blogger Oleksandr Baraboshko and channel director Pavlo Nemeryuk). In 2020, the channel started broadcasting by satellite, but after the entry into force of the Law on Media in July 2023, Iceland changed its technology to Internet broadcasting (OTT).

On 26 October 2023, the National Council on Television and Radio Broadcasting appointed an unscheduled inspection of the ISLND TV channel. The National Council received a complaint from journalist Dmytro Gordon about the channel's broadcast. The regulator monitored and recorded the presence of obscene language in the programmes Rozryvand Super live with Volodymyr Petrov. According to Maksym Onopriyenko, a member of the National Council, according to the Law "On Media", the dissemination of obscene words can harm the mental and moral development of children. At the same time, there were no signs or warnings about this in the aforementioned programmes of the ISLND TV channel. On 31 October 2023, the National Council on Television and Radio Broadcasting at its meeting denied Iceland a digital broadcasting licence. Representatives of the regulator, in particular, noted during the discussion that Volodymyr Petrov and other hosts of the channel told outright lies to the regulator in their broadcasts. According to the members of the National Council, the regulator has repeatedly received complaints about obscene language and swearing on the channel's broadcasts.

== Scandals ==
On 15 December 2021, Petrov, along with Sergii Ivanov and former hosts of Viktor Medvedchuk's closed pro-Russian TV channels, started working as a host on Rada TV channel. On Friday, 17 December, a meeting was held in the Verkhovna Rada at the request of the Deputy Speaker of the Parliament, Olena Kondratiuk, to discuss the situation with the Rada TV channel. The participants of the meeting agreed that political strategist Volodymyr Petrov should not be on the air of the parliamentary TV channel. On the same day, the editorial board of the Rada TV channel decided to suspend Petrov from the air. According to Detector Media's sources, the parliamentarians were outraged by Volodymyr Petrov's criticism of former German Chancellor Angela Merkel on 15 December, which he addressed after a story about pig tattoos.

On 23 October 2023, Volodymyr Petrov threatened to "punish" Natalia Lygachova, the editor-in-chief of Detector Media, on his YouTube channel ISLND TV, for her words about his work for the Presidential Office. Roman Golovenko, a lawyer with the Institute of Mass Information (IMI), notes that at the end of the video, Sergii Ivanov asked Volodymyr Petrov to stop speaking and not to threaten, and stressed that even his colleague on the air interpreted these words as threats. Danylo Popkov, a lawyer with the Zmina Human Rights Centre, explained that Petrov's words about Natalia Lygachova fall under Article 345-1 of the Criminal Code of Ukraine — threatening or violence against a journalist. He stressed that Lygachova's words about Petrov's activities, which led to his threats, were spoken in public and can be interpreted as journalistic activity, and therefore the article covers this case.

On 27 October 2023, on ISLND TV, Petrov called Natalia Lygachova, editor-in-chief of Detector Media, and Yulia Mostova and Vitaliy Sych, editors-in-chief of Dzerkalo Tyzhnia and The New Voice of Ukraine, "escorts". On 7 November, Petrov called Ukrainska Pravda journalists "wafflers".

Investigative journalist Yuriy Nikolov said that on 14 January 2024, unknown men broke into his apartment and tried to intimidate him. According to the journalist, 15 minutes later, a post with video and photos from the scene was published on one of the anonymous Telegram channels Card Office. It shows the door covered with papers with the words "zradnyk" and "ukhyliant". On 16 January, Servant of the People MP Maryana Bezuhla said that the Card Office Telegram channel, which was the first to spread information about the provocation near journalist Yuriy Nikolov's apartment, was run by Volodymyr Petrov and his co-host Sergii Ivanov. The attackers were immediately detained and have already testified. According to journalist Dmytro Gordon, they pointed directly to Petrov as the mastermind of the attack.

During 2023–2024, in co-authorship with Sergii Ivanov, on the ISLND TV, Volodymyr Petrov repeatedly made negative comments about Masha Efrosinina and the singer Alyona Alyona and humiliated them. Alyona Alyona responded to Petrov and Ivanov's statements on Instagram. She reminded that this was not the first public insult they had made against her. Masha Efrosinina also reacted to the Alyona Alyona scandal, saying that she was "perhaps the very first woman they started upholstering their misogynistic narratives". He adds that she "never drew attention to it". "For me, they are just like a street garbage can that I pass by every morning without turning my head," Efrosinina said.

== Criminal prosecution ==
On 29 November 2018, Petrov was detained as part of a criminal investigation by the Main Military Prosecutor's Office with the participation of officers of the Internal Security Department of the National Police of Ukraine on suspicion of committing a number of crimes: violation of the secrecy of correspondence or telephone conversations and privacy, false reporting of a crime with the artificial creation of evidence, influence on a law enforcement officer in order to obstruct his work, illegal collection, storage and use of confidential information. Blogger Oleksandr Baraboshko was also detained in connection with this case. These criminal cases were opened after a high-profile "sex scandal" on the Internet, when Natalia Bureiko, a student of the Kyiv Polytechnic Institute, accused National Police official Oleksandr Varchenko, who is the husband of the First Deputy Head of the State Bureau of Investigation Olha Varchenko, of sexual harassment via the Tinder app. The court placed Petrov under round-the-clock house arrest until 27 January 2019; he pleaded not guilty.

On 10 December, in an interview with Natalia Vlashchenko, Chief Military Prosecutor of Ukraine Anatolii Matios said that 11 people had been identified as being involved in the dissemination of classified information with personal data obtained from a source in law enforcement agencies, and that Petrov and Baraboshko were suspected of receiving and using this information for "unlawful interference in personal life".

According to Anatolii Matios, Volodymyr Petrov gained access to people's personal data through a leak from the State Protection Department of Ukraine and traded it for his clients.

== Political views ==
Volodymyr Petrov has pro-Russian and Ukrainophobic views. Petrov's teachers are ideologues of Ruscism. In an interview with journalist Natalia Vlashchenko, Volodymyr Petrov said that since 2001 he has known Russian campaign managers whom he calls his teachers. These are Volodymyr Granovskyi (who worked for Yanukovych's shadow headquarters and headed the pro-Russian Nash TV channel), Dmitry Kulikov, and Timofey Sergeitsev (one of the ideologues of Ruscism, author of the scandalous article What Russia Should Do with Ukraine). Petrov says that he learned from them how to approach life, and he also repeats the thesis of Dmitry Kulikov and Timofey Sergeitsev about the existence of "three Ukraine's". Among Petrov's priority contacts for a long time were such persons as propagandist Oleksandr Chalenko, and Russian campaign manager Semyon Uralov.

In 2012, he admitted that he sympathised with Prime Minister Mykola Azarov, who fled to Russia after the Euromaidan protests, and Petrov was outraged that anyone could be unhappy with Yanukovych. During Viktor Yanukovych's presidency, Petrov organised a rally in support of the Russian language in Ukraine.

Petrov spoke derogatorily about the events of Euromaidan in 2013–2014. In particular, he compared the civic position of its participants to obscurantism and stupidity. After the Euromaidan, Petrov began his active media activity in the Ukrainian information space. On his Lumpen Show in 2014, he compared news from the occupied territories with news from Ukraine and concluded that things were worse in Ukraine because everyone was stealing. In the same year, he spoke with a "guest from the DPR" Ramil Zamdykhanov, where Petrov called the war unleashed by Russia a "conflict". Zamdykhanov, speaking about the reasons for the outbreak of the war, called it a "people's uprising", allegedly caused by people's dissatisfaction with their standard of living. Petrov did not refute his words and did not object when Zamdykhanov accused Kyiv of aggression. Petrov also compared the war to computer games, when Zamdykhanov suggested that the war was started by "a generation that grew up playing Counter-Strike and now wants to shoot for real". The propagandist's version seemed to Petrov "very, very similar to the truth".

After the annexation of Crimea by the Russian Federation, he stated that he did not consider Crimea to be Ukrainian. After the start of Russian armed aggression in Donbas, Volodymyr Petrov said that he had abstracted himself from the war, had no enemies among Russians and Ukrainians and did not understand the war for "primitive ideals". In 2016, in one of his Facebook posts, Petrov called the Russo-Ukrainian war a "civil war". He stated that he would never be able to shoot at Russians and that the war was "between us and us". Petrov said that "as a person whose first passport had the nationality Russian written in it, it is very difficult for him to divide the world between Ukrainians and Russians". "If it was a war with Romania or Poland, I would probably go. But, of course, if I am drafted into the army, I will resist with my arms and legs or ask to go to a medical unit to bandage wounds and cut or amputate something. Because I honestly don't understand how to shoot towards Russia, towards Russian people," Petrov said in one of his Lumpen Show broadcasts. Petrov is also convinced that there are "pro-Russian patriots" in Ukraine who support Vladimir Putin.

In 2015, Petrov claimed that the Ukrainian Armed Forces were allegedly shelling civilians in the temporarily occupied Donetsk. This episode was published on 2 February 2015, but the video is currently unavailable. In the episode of the Lumpen Show, Petrov's "guest" was a pro-Russian propagandist, British Graham Phillips, who in 2022 was sanctioned by the UK for supporting Russian aggression. During the video link, Graham Phillips called Ukrainian troops "fascists", to which Petrov did not deny this and did not even ask any clarifying questions. Phillips also added that the 'militias' only die when Ukrainians attack their checkpoints or bases.

In one of his broadcasts, Petrov admired Olena Bondarenko, a member of the Party of Regions and a pro-Russian politician, saying that she was "so brave that all our politicians should learn from her". Volodymyr Petrov also admired the courage of the then-living leader of the DPR, Alexander Zakharchenko.

During his campaign for the 2019 Ukrainian presidential election, Volodymyr Petrov stated that he wanted to be loved in Ukraine as much as Vladimir Putin is loved in Russia.

Petrov is known for calling fighters for the Ukrainian language and Ukrainian-speaking people "a herd of underdeveloped creatures with a low-quality gene pool" on social media. In 2021, Petrov staged a provocation on his YouTube channel ISLND TV on the topic of the Ukrainian language. He posted a video in which he criticised the Ukrainian language and said that it sounded like a crawling cart. He told me that Russian is a simpler language, while Ukrainian has letters that are difficult to pronounce.

Petrov believes that 90% of Ukrainian citizens do not need freedom of speech because they are "not experts".

In 2022, Petrov recorded a video message on his YouTube channel ISLND TV to a Ukrainian serviceman, Senior Sergeant of the Armed Forces of Ukraine Oleh Barna, calling him worse than the Russian occupiers. On 17 April 2023, Oleh Barna was killed in action at the front near Vuhledar.

In 2023, he said that Ukrainians who left the country during the Russian invasion of Ukraine should have their rights restricted. Petrov believes that the state should not create conditions for refugees, but rather provide them.

== Criticism ==
A number of Ukrainian media outlets, journalists and politicians call Petrov a "campaign manager" and "media killer", and describe his activities as "pro-Russian", "anti-Ukrainian" and "propagandistic". In particular, he was included in the database of the Myrotvorets centre for participating in acts of humanitarian aggression against Ukraine. According to Detector Media, Volodymyr Petrov has been involved in Ukrainian politics and media for over twenty years. And during this time, he gained fame as a kind of dirty bomb that politicians drop on opponents when they play without rules. The campaign manager does not disclose his clients, but his public trail stretches from Arseniy Yatsenyuk to, apparently, Volodymyr Zelenskyy. Journalist Yaroslav Zubchenko emphasises that "the methods of work of the media killer are quite tough".

Natalia Lygachova, editor-in-chief of the Detector Media portal, called Volodymyr Petrov and Sergii Ivanov "campaign managers". According to her, "like the previous government, the current one often uses [...] technologies".

According to the Chesno civic movement, Petrov is probably involved in discrediting such people as Arseniy Yatsenyuk, Oleksiy Honcharenko, Volodymyr Rondin, Hennadii Korban, Vadim Rabinovich, Serhiy Teryokhin, Viktor Ukolov, Ruslan Bogdan, Oleh Liashko, Ihor Mosiychuk, and Andriy Lozovyi.

Ukrainian journalist Dmytro Gordon believes that Petrov has the blood of Ukrainians on his hands. According to him, "Volodymyr Petrov is a Russian campaign manager who has learnt Ukrainian and was introduced by the Russians into our information space to undermine the situation inside Ukraine." On 26 February 2024, Dmytro Gordon published an extensive investigation into Volodymyr Petrov, in which he outlined how Petrov promoted Kremlin narratives. According to Gordon, Petrov's actions "fall under the article on treason in the same way as the actions of pro-Russian propagandists Anatoliy Shariy and Diana Panchenko, who fled Ukraine". He is confident that "after this, the Security Service of Ukraine will investigate Petrov and Ivanov".

According to Olesia Batsman, editor-in-chief of the Gordon online media outlet and journalist, if we forgive Petrov and Ivanov for their media activities, "we will not know how to wake up in a society where such media monsters will raise necrophiliac media monsters like themselves".

According to Oleksiy Honcharenko, an MP from the European Solidarity party and a politician, Petrov was openly working for the Russian special services. According to Goncharenko, "Petrov built the entire campaign for Markov on his dislike of Putin". After the publication of the investigation by journalist Dmytro Gordon, Oleksiy Honcharenko filed a deputy appeal in which he asked the Security Service of Ukraine to provide a legal assessment of the actions of the bloggers outlined in the investigation and "do everything necessary to stop their anti-Ukrainian activities".
