= Olesia Batsman =

Ukrainian journalist

- Олеся Бацман
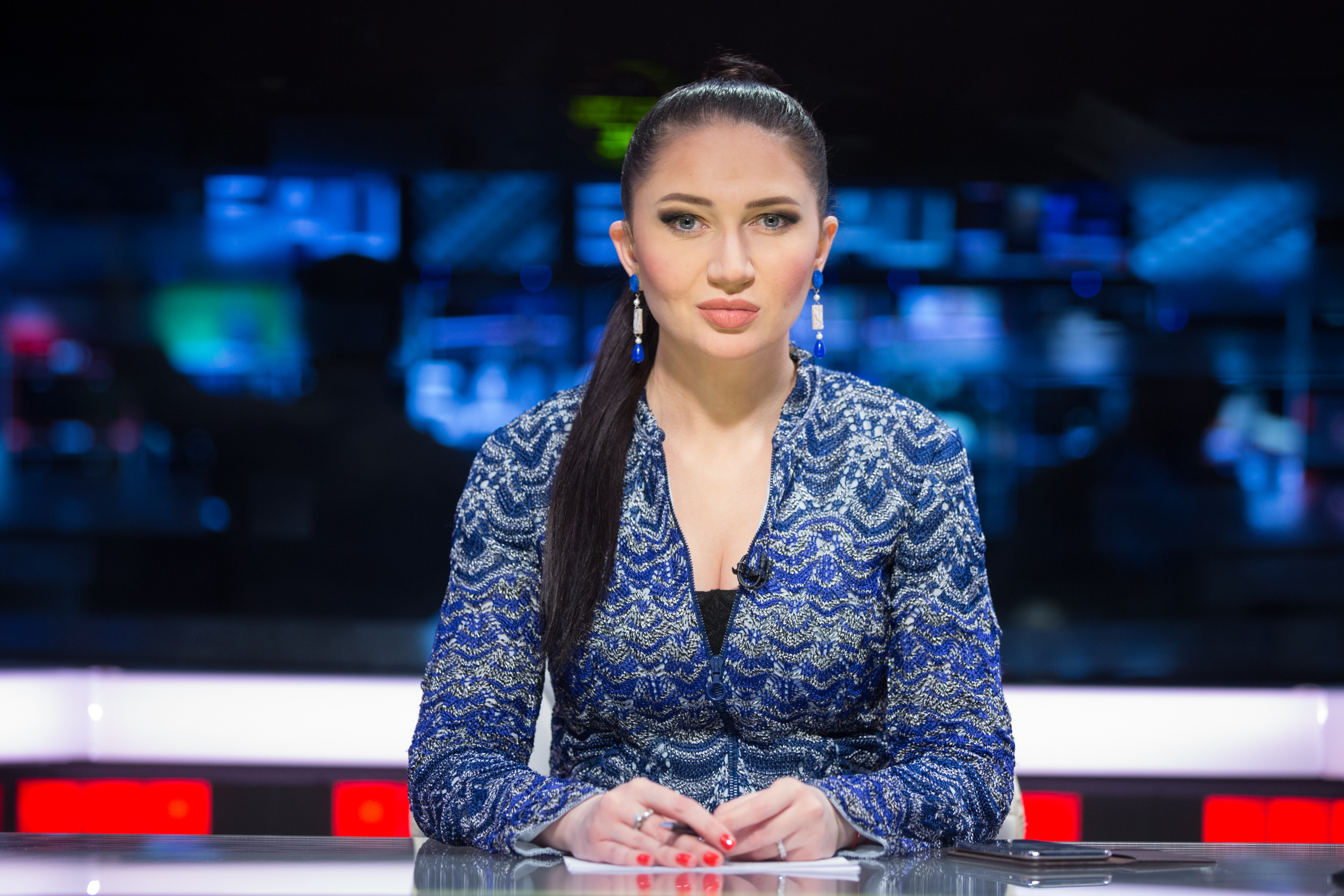
- Batsman in 2018
- Born: Olesia Leonidivna Batsman; 3 October 1984 (age 41); Kharkov, Ukrainian SSR, Soviet Union
- Occupations: Journalist; interviewer; television presenter
- Years active: 2003–present
- Spouse: Dmitry Gordon
- Children: 3

Olesia Leonidivna Batsman (Ukrainian: Олеся Леонідівна Бацман; born October 3, 1984) is a Ukrainian journalist, TV presenter, and editor-in-chief of the online edition "GORDON".

== Career ==
She has been working as a journalist since she was a student. During her studies at the university she worked with a number of Kharkiv mass media: wrote to the newspaper "Vremya", filmed stories for the program "Curfew", which was broadcast on "Channel 7", was the editor-in-chief of the youth newspaper "Zebra".

In 2006 she moved to Kyiv and for six years worked with the well-known in the post-Soviet space TV host Savik Schuster as an editor of his program, which was broadcast on various Ukrainian TV channels. While working in the Schuster program, she was also a freelance correspondent for the "Mirror of the Week" – an influential analytical newspaper and "Gordon Boulevard" – a newspaper about celebrities.

Since November 2013, she has been the editor-in-chief of the GORDON Internet edition — one of the most popular websites in Ukraine created at the beginning of the Revolution of Dignity. The average daily traffic to the site is about 1 million readers.

In July 2017 Batsman began to host an author's program "Batsman Live" on NewsOne, and in September switched to the channel "112 Ukraine", where her program changed its name to "Batsman". The host invited famous politicians, public and cultural figures for interviews. The journalist said that she was not an employee of these TV channels and did not receive salaries there, and their management, by agreement, could not interfere in the editorial policy of her programs.

In May 2019, Batsman terminated cooperation with 112 Ukraine due to the influence of Viktor Medvedchuk on the channel — a controversial Ukrainian politician, former head of the Administration of the President of Ukraine, personal friend of Russian President Vladimir Putin, who is godfather to Medvedchuk's daughter and one of the ideologues of the "Russian world" in Ukraine. She called further stay on the channel counterproductive and harmful to herself. After that, the journalist began to develop her YouTube channel. In January 2021, she received the "Silver Button" from YouTube after surpassing 100 thousand subscribers.

In January 2022 Batsman and her husband, a well-known Ukrainian journalist Dmytro Gordon, launched a YouTube talk show "GORDON". According to the journalist, it was the first political talk show available on this platform in the world. Current political and social topics were discussed by guests in the studio. There were four broadcasts aired up until February 24, 2022, when Russia launched a full-scale invasion of Ukraine. After that, the talk show was put on hold.

In March 2024 an international non-governmental organisation Reporters Without Borders officially launched the Svoboda Satellite Package project. Nine Russian-speaking TV and radio channels, in particular the Gordon Live channel, were being broadcast to territories including Russia, occupied territories of Ukraine and Baltic countries. Batsman and Gordon interviews are shown on a 24/7 basis as well as content from their YouTube channels. The presentation of the project was hosted in Brussels at the European Parliament with participation and support from Věra Jourová, vice-president of the European Commission. This project will be accessible to 61 million households in total, in particular to 4.5 million households in the Russian Federation and about 800 thousand in the occupied territories of Ukraine. Its primary objective is to provide people with high-quality information, in addition to the fight against Russian propaganda, said the former secretary general of Reporters Without Borders Christophe Deloire along with Svoboda project director Jim Phillipoff during an interview with Batsman. «We want to reverse the logic of propaganda. We do not want to fight propaganda with propaganda. It's not a very effective remedy. We want to have independent journalism to be broadcast to an audience living under propaganda regimes», — explained Deloire.
