= Ihor Tolstykh =

Ukrainian journalist and TV manager (born 1956)

- Born: October 19, 1956 (age 69); Mariupol

Ihor Mykhailovych Tolstykh (Ukrainian: Ігор Михайлович Толстих; 19 October 1956) is a Ukrainian journalist and TV manager. From March 2013 to March 2014 he was the chief executive officer of Rada TV, the television channel of the Ukrainian parliament Verkhovna Rada.

== Biography ==
=== Early years. Education ===
Ihor Tolstykh was born on 19 October 1956 in Mariupol, then part of the Soviet Union. During his military service with the Soviet Border Troops he was stationed in Armenia. In 1982 he graduated in journalism from the Rostov State University in Rostov-on-Don.

=== Career ===
Since 1982 Tolstykh was a reporter of Mariupol city newspaper Pryazovia Worker. In September 1991 he became the deputy editor of the business newspaper Contact in the Eastern Ukrainian city of Donetsk. From 1995 to 1997 he was the dean of the faculty of journalism of the Donetsk Institute of Social Education. From 1997 to 1998 he led the press service of the Donetsk Oblast Administration under then governor Viktor Yanukovych. In July 1998 Tolstykh became the chief executive officer of the Donetsk Oblast State TV and Radio Company.

In 2004 he became Vice President and Deputy CEO of the National Television Company of Ukraine. In March 2013 he became the CEO of the parliament financed TV channel Rada TV. In March 2014 he was replaced on this position by Vasyl Klymchuk.

Tolstykh is a member of the National Union of Journalists of Ukraine since 1990.

== See also ==
- Rada TV
- National Television Company of Ukraine
