= Gordon Boulevard =

Gordon Boulevard may refer to:

- Virginia State Route 123, named Gordon Boulevard through Prince William County, Virginia, United States
- Gordon Boulevard (newspaper), a Ukrainian newspaper founded by Dmitry Gordon
