= Volodymyr Ariev =

Ukrainian journalist, film director, and politician

- Володимир Ар'єв
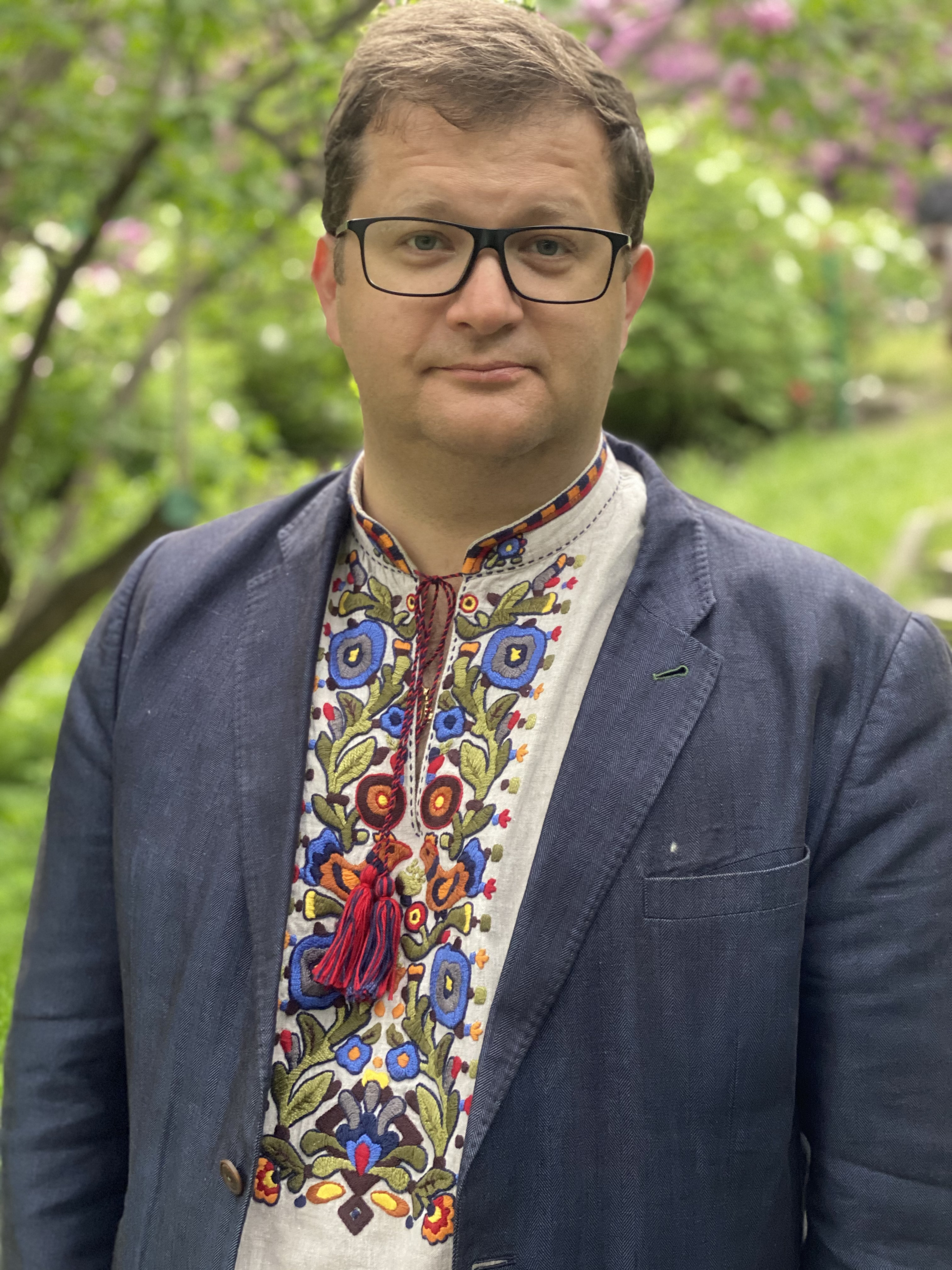
- Ariev in 2021

People's Deputy of Ukraine
- Incumbent
- Assumed office 23 November 2007

Personal details
- Born: 31 March 1975 (age 51) Kyiv, Ukrainian SSR, Soviet Union
- Party: European Solidarity
- Occupation: Journalist; film director
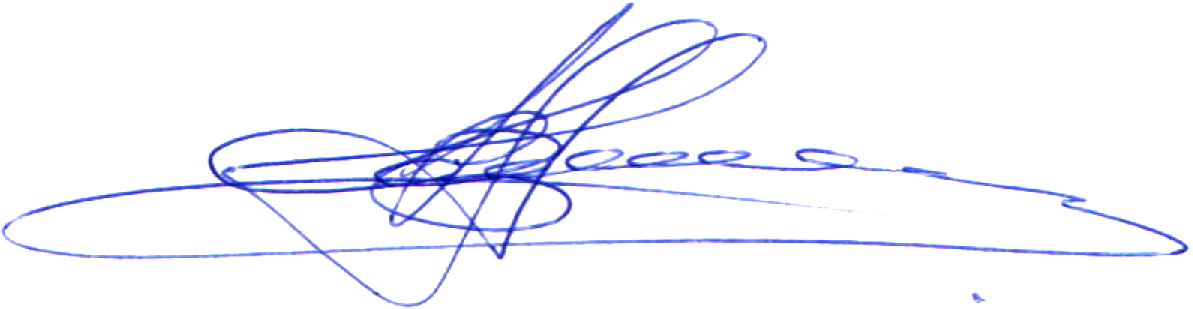
- Signature

Volodymyr Ihorovych Ariev (Ukrainian: Володимир Ігорович Ар'єв; born 31 March 1975) is a Ukrainian politician, journalist, film director, author of the investigative TV-series "Restricted Area", Member of Verkhovna Rada since 2007, Chair of Ukrainian delegation in Parliamentary Assembly of the Council of Europe in 2015–2019, PACE Vice-President (2015, 2018), President of PACE Committee for Culture, Education, Science and Media (2016–2017). Ariev is in the rank of Extraordinary and Plenipotentiary Ambassador.

== Biography ==
Volodymyr Ariev was born in Kyiv on 31 March 1975.

=== Education ===
- 1992, Nature and Science Lyceum in Kyiv
- 1998, Institute for Journalism affiliated with Kyiv National University
- 1994, student of BBC World Service school, Kyiv

=== Career ===
- February 1993 – October 1994, assistant reporter, stringer of Ukrainian and Russian BBC services, (Kyiv)
- October 1994 – January 1996, special correspondent, host of "Vikna-novyny" news program, "Internews"
- January 1996 – May 1996, special correspondent, information agency "Vikna"
- May – November 1996, host of the news block in "Good Morning Ukraine!", UT-1 channel
- November 1996 – September 2003, special correspondent, Information and Analytical service, TV channel Inter
- 2002, journalist of TSN, 1+1 Studio
- March 2003 – March 2004, independent journalist and author of the program "Non-province"(STB), freelance writer at weekly "Zerkalo Nedeli" ("Mirror Weekly"); special correspondent at JSC Television Information Agency "Profi TV"
- March 2004 – December 2005, – Director and author of the program "Closed Zone", "Channel 5"
- 2007 – 5 Kanal stopped collaboration with Volodymyr Ariev producer center due to he ran for Parliamentary Elections.
- MP 6th Verkhovna Rada since November 2007, was elected by the lists of "Our Ukraine – People's Self-Defense Bloc"
- Second term in MP office 7th Verkhovna Rada since November 2012, was elected in constituency 218, Kyiv for Batkivshchyna.
- Third term in MP office 8th Verkhovna Rada since November 2014, was re-elected in constituency 218, Kyiv for Petro Poroshenko Bloc.
- Since 2015 Chairman of Ukrainian delegation to PACE
- PACE Vice-President (2015, 2018)
- In 2016–2017 President of PACE Committee for Culture, Education, Science and Media, PACE General Rapporteur for media freedom and safety of journalists
- Since September 2017 Ariev hosts a political talk show on the TV channel "Direct".
- Ariev was elected to parliament 4th time for European Solidarity in the 2019 Ukrainian parliamentary election as number 17 of its election list.
- Ariev's daughter Yaryna Arieva was elected (at the age of 20) to the Kyiv City Council for European Solidarity in the 2020 Ukrainian local elections.

== Filmography ==
- Donetsk mafia. Reloaded. "Zmina" Studio, 2007.
- Kyiv tragedy, 1960th. 2008
- The Secrets of the Black Sea. 2009
- Ukraine: from democracy to chaos. Co-production, Grain de Sables (France), 2012

== Awards ==
- Awardee of V.Marchenko Prize for the best media coverage of the human rights theme (2004)
- Awardee of О. Krivenko Prize "For progress in journalism" (2005)
- Honored Journalist of Ukraine
- Winner of the national prize "TV-triumph" (2005, 2006)

== Family ==
Ariev is married to Natalka Fitsych (b. 1977), editor-in-chief of the production company "Restricted Area". They have a daughter Yaryna (b. 2000).

== See also ==
- List of Ukrainian Parliament Members 2007
- Verkhovna Rada
