= Natalia Vlaschenko =

Ukrainian journalist and theatrologist

- Наталія Влащенко
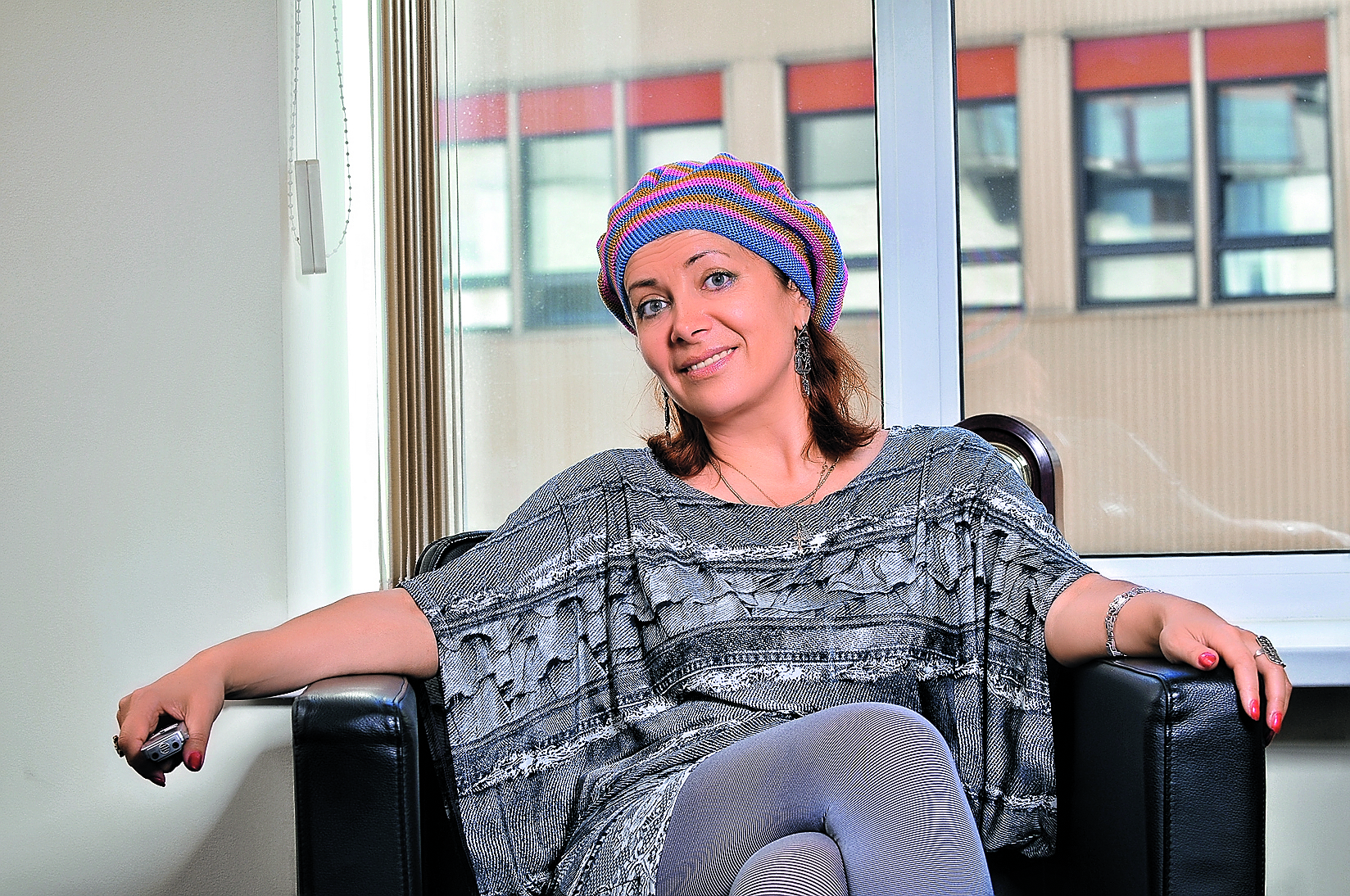
- Vlaschenko in 2010
- Born: 11 September 1960 (age 65); Zhitomir, Ukrainian SSR, Soviet Union
- Citizenship: Ukraine
- Occupations: Journalist; theatrologist; screenwriter; television presenter; playwright; television producer; columnist; publisher; contributing editor
- Notable work: "Theft, or White Sun of Crimea" (2017) "Under the Sky of Austerlitz" (2018) "His Guard's Girlfriend" (2019)
- Awards: Honored Journalist of Ukraine
- Website: Vlashenko versus government (her YouTube channel)

Natalia Viktorivna Vlaschenko (Ukrainian: Наталія Вікторівна Влащенко; 11 September 1960) is a Ukrainian journalist, theatrologist, screenwriter, television presenter, playwright, producer, columnist, publisher, and contributing editor. She is the general producer of the Ukrainian TV-channel "ZIK", the ex-editor-in-chief of the Ukrainian socio-political magazine "Public people", and Honored Journalist of Ukraine.

She is the host of the political talk show "Narod proti", the programs "Pershi-drugi", "HARD with Vlaschenko" and the final talk show "Special project with Natasha Vlaschenko" on the "ZIK" TV-channel. Since 2018, she has been hosting the YouTube vlog "Vlast vs Vlaschenko".

She is included in the rating of the 100 most influential women in Ukraine by Focus magazine in 2017, 2018 and 2019.

She is a member of the Council for Freedom of Speech at the Office of the President of Ukraine.

== Biography ==
In 2011, she co-authored the book "Animal Dialogues" with Yevhen Minko.

In 2014–2017, Vlaschenko worked on the TV channel "112 Ukraine".

In February 2017, Vlaschenko became the creative producer of the Ukrainian TV channel "ZIK" and presented the book “Theft, or White Sun of Crimea”. In August, she became the general producer of the Ukrainian TV channel "ZIK".

In 2017 and 2018, she was included in the rating of the 100 most influential women in Ukraine by Focus magazine and was awarded the Ukrainian Woman of the "Third Millennium Award" in the "Rating" section.

In 2019, she is again included in the rating of the 100 most influential women in Ukraine, according Focus magazine.

== Books ==
- Yevhen Minko, Natasha Vlaschenko. "Animal Dialogues". Kyiv: Flyleaf. 2011. 120 pages. ISBN 978-966-97148-1-7
- Garik Korogodskyi, Natasha Vlaschenko. "We Had Sex". Kharkiv: Folio. 2015 319 pages. ISBN 978-966-03-7157-6
- Natasha Vlaschenko. "Theft, or White Sun of Crimea". Kharkiv: Folio. 2017. 400 pages. ISBN 978-966-03-7815-5

== Family ==
- Son — Sergey, a political strategist.
