= Pryazovia Worker =

Pryazovia Worker Russian: Приазовский рабочий
- Type: social-political newspaper
- Format: A2
- Owner: SCM
- Publisher: PJSC «Pryazovia Worker»
- Editor: Nikolay Tokarskiy
- Founded: March 9, 1918
- Language: Russian
- Headquarters: Lenin Avenue, 19, Mariupol, Donetsk oblast 87500 Ukraine
- Website: http://pr.ua/

The Pryazovia Worker (Russian: Приазовский рабочий) is a regional Russian-language newspaper in Ukraine.

== History ==
The newspaper was founded on March 9, 1918, in Mariupol. At various times, it published under different names: Reports of the Mariupol Military Revolutionary Committee (Russian: «Известия Мариупольского военно-революционного комитета»), Reports of the Revolutionary and Party Committee of Mariupol (Russian: «Известия Мариупольского ревкома и парткома»), Pryazovia Truth (Russian: «Приазовская правда»), Our Truth (Russian: «Наша правда»), and Pryazovia Proletarian (Russian: «Приазовский пролетарий»). It began publishing under its current name on April 16, 1937.

== Today ==
The newspaper is distribution throughout the south of the Donets Basin; it had the largest circulation in Donetsk oblast in 2010. It has its own printing, distribution network and shop. As of 2008, it had about 100 employees.

The newspaper is a subdivision of the company PJSC «Pryazovia Worker», which publishes other periodicals and runs an advertising agency. The beneficial owner of PJSC «Pryazovia Worker», holding 88.69% of shares, is SCM, the holding company of Rinat Akhmetov, the richest man in Ukraine.
