= Volodymyr Ivanov (politician, born 1953) =

Ukrainian politician

- Володимир Іванов
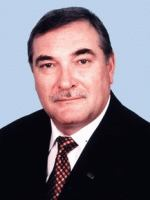
- Official portrait, 2006

People's Deputy of Ukraine

5th convocation
- In office April 2006 – 2007

Personal details
- Born: 28 November 1953 (age 72) Elgen, Yagodninsky District, Magadan Oblast, Russian SFSR, Soviet Union (present-day Russia)
- Citizenship: Ukraine
- Occupation: Politician

Volodymyr Mykhailovych Ivanov (Ukrainian: Володимир Михайлович Іванов; 28 November 1953) is a Ukrainian politician, candidate of Pedagogical Sciences (1998), member of the Party of Regions (since 2005) who served as People's Deputy of Ukraine from 2006 to 2007.

== Early life ==
Ivanov was born on 28 November 1953 in the village of Elgen, Yagodninsky District, Magadan Oblast, RSFSR. He is ethnic Russian. His father is Mikhail Filatovich (born 1925) and mother Praskoviya Sergeevna (born 1926). His wife Liubov Yegorivna (1953) has worked as a deputy director for educational work at school No. 2; son Serhiy (born 1976) is a well-known Ukrainian journalist and writer; daughter Natalia (born 1983) is a lawyer.

== Education ==
He studied Russian Language and Literature at Voroshilovgrad Pedagogical Institute named after T. Shevchenko, Faculty of Philology in 1971–1975. In 1995 he finished Ukrainian financial and banking school. During 1997-1999 he studied at Luhansk Institute of Internal Affairs.

== Politics ==
Ivanov was the People's Deputy of Ukraine of the 5th convocation (from April 2006 to the autumn of 2007) in the Party of Regions fraction.

Under the presidents of Kuchma and Yushchenko he worked as deputy head of the Luhansk regional state administration, and for some time managed to be a subordinate of the odious Oleksandr Efremov.
