= Rada TV =

Parliamentary TV-channel «Rada» Парламентський телеканал «Рада»
- Country: Ukraine
- Broadcast area: Ukraine
- Headquarters: Kyiv, Ukraine

Programming
- Picture format: 16:9 (576i, SDTV); 16:9 (1080i HDTV)

Ownership
- Owner: Verkhovna Rada

History
- Launched: 23 March 1999

Availability

Terrestrial
- KRRT (Ukraine): MX-7 (40)
- LVRTC (Latvia): MX-1 (6)

Parliamentary TV-channel «RADA» (Ukrainian: Парламентський телеканал «РАДА») is the official television channel of the Ukrainian parliament (Verkhovna Rada).

Until its relaunch in December 2021, it showed live broadcasts of the parliament's meetings, and others programs related to the law-making process. After December 2021, RADA was a state-owned, 24/7 news and informational TV channel. The channel was created in 1998 and is financed from the state budget. In 2025, the channel resumed live broadcasts of parliamentary sessions following a three-year ban it imposed due to security reasons following the 2022 Russian invasion of Ukraine.

== Controversies ==
According to UDAR MP Iryna Herashchenko in December 2013 the channel ignored the pro-European rallies of Euromaidan while broadcasting mostly speeches and statements made by government members and rallies held by Party of Regions (and thus not covering the activities of all parliamentary factions and MPs, including opposition and independent deputies).

== CEOs ==
- Mykola Orlovskyi (1999 — 2012)
- Vasyl Klymchuk (February 2012 — March 2013)
- Ihor Tolstykh (March 2013 — March 2014)
- Vasyl Klymchuk (acting, from March 2014)

== Satellite Television ==
- Satellite: Amos (4.0°W)
- Standard: DVB-S
- Frequency: 12297
- Personal: Horizontal
- Speed: 45000
- FEC: 3/4
- Image: MPEG-4
- Audio: MPEG L-2
- Code: FTA
- Satellite: Amos (4.0°W)
- Standard: DVB-S
- Frequency: 12341
- Personal: Horizontal
- Speed: 17900
- FEC: 2/3
- Image: MPEG-4
- Audio: MPEG L-2
- Code: FTA
- Satellite: Astra (4.8°E)
- Standard: DVB-S
- Frequency: 11938
- Personal: Horizontal
- Speed: 27500
- FEC: 3/4
- Image: MPEG-4
- Audio: MPEG L-2
- Code: FTA

== See also ==
- List of Ukrainian language television channels
- C-SPAN
