= Diana Panchenko =

Ukrainian journalist and TV host (born 1988)

Diana Vitalievna Panchenko
- Діана Віталіївна Панченко
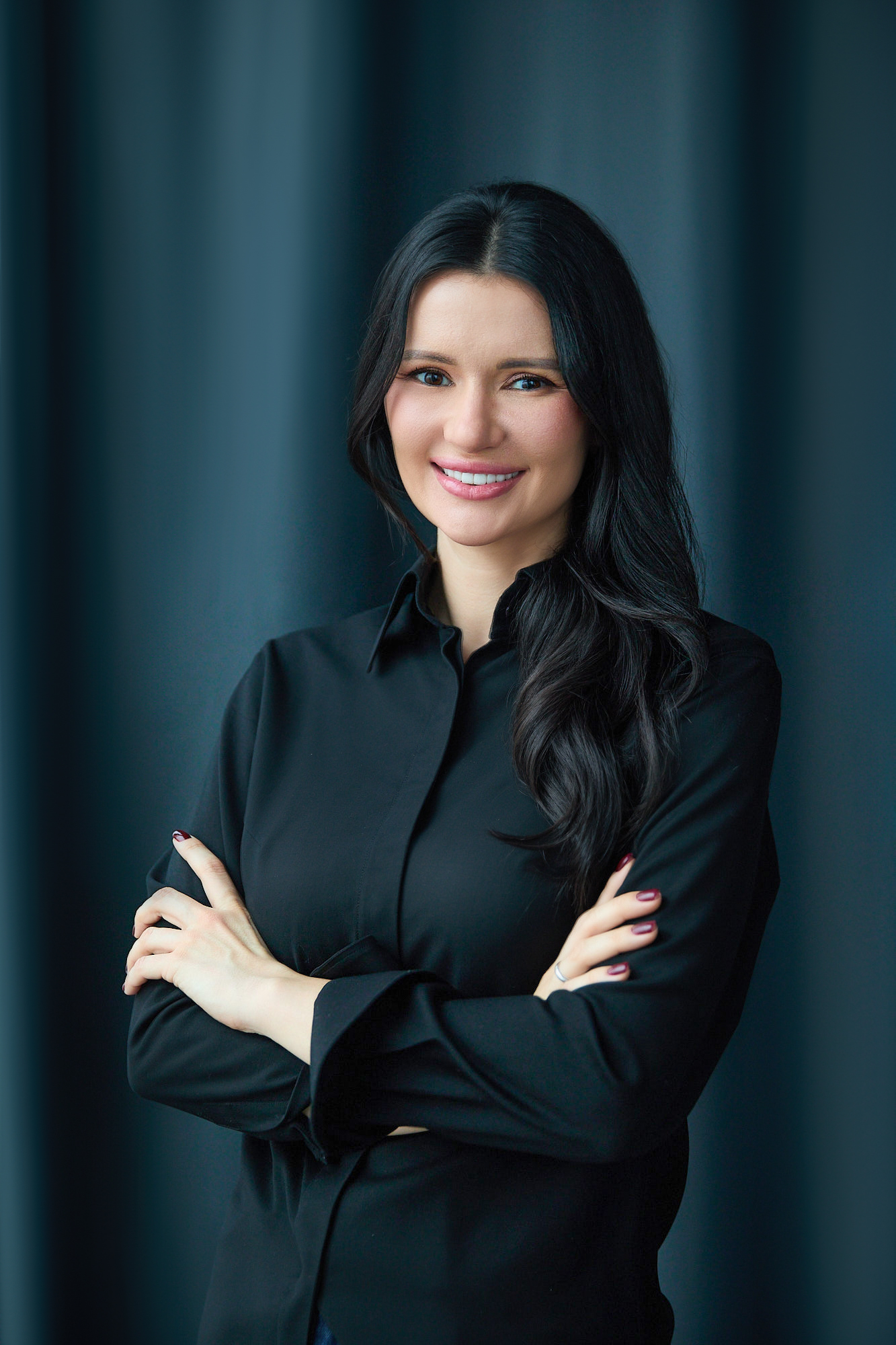
- Born: 21 May 1988 (age 38); Mykolaiv, Ukrainian SSR, USSR
- Citizenship: Ukraine
- Education: Publishing
- Alma mater: NTUU KPI
- Occupation: YouTuber
- Television: NewsOne

Diana Vitalievna Panchenko (Ukrainian: Діана Віталіївна Панченко; born 21 May 1988) is a Ukrainian journalist and TV presenter. In the context of Russia's war against Ukraine, she has been working for pro-Russian media.

== Biography ==
In 2010, Panchenko graduated from the Igor Sikorsky Kyiv Polytechnic Institute with a degree in publishing and editing, and in 2018, she graduated from Taras Shevchenko National University of Kyiv with a degree in law. She worked in Gazeta.ua, Kyiv TV and NewsOne.

In 2020 she was awarded the "Journalist of the Year" by the Ukrainian program "Person of the Year-2020". The same year she placed 7th in the ranking of "The Most Influential Women in Ukraine according to readers of the Focus website". In 2021, she was nominated for the UNESCO/Guillermo Cano World Press Freedom Prize.

Panchenko worked for the pro-Russian TV-Station NewsOne. Following the outlawing of NewsOne late February 2021, Panchenko moved to its successor The First Independent TV Channel. This channel was shut down an hour after it launched. On 26 February 2021, she co-founded the Journalists' Defense Club movement. Diana was the host of the Slavonic Bazaar music festival, which took place in July 2021 in Vitebsk. After the event, Panchenko was summoned to the National Television and Radio Broadcasting Council for explanations.

At the onset of the war in February 2022, Panchenko condemned Russia's invasion and Vladimir Putin's decision to escalate the already strained relations between Russia and Ukraine. From the very first days of the war, Panchenko called for negotiations stating that "A bad peace is better than a good war". She claimed that Ukraine had provoked Russia into a full-scale war and blamed the Ukrainian authorities for all the consequences of the war. Panchenko has continued hosting, including interviewing Aleksandr Lukashenko.

In January 2023, the Security Service of Ukraine (SBU) declared that it suspected her of producing and disseminating content justifying the Russian invasion. In October 2023, the SBU announced that it was carrying out a pre-trial investigation into Panchenko, suspecting her of high treason committed under martial law.

In September 2024, Jeanne Cavelier of Reporters Without Borders described Panchenko's work as follows: "Diana Panchenko is a professional propagandist who imitates journalistic news videos to spread Kremlin-backed disinformation to Russian-speaking – and now English-speaking – audiences. By twisting facts to conform to the official Russian narrative, she pollutes the information space with falsehoods about Ukraine and other international subjects that interest Russia. RSF condemns the manipulative actions of this Russian propaganda agent, who compromises the right to reliable information." The article also stated that Diana Panchenko currently resided in Dubai. In return, Panchenko called on Reporters Without Borders to be honest, accusing the organization of being funded by governments and functioning as a PR agency. She claimed that despite their increasing funding, freedom of speech continues to diminish.

In August 2025, Panchenko's YouTube channel, which had 1.8 million subscribers and millions of views as of September 2024, was deleted following a request from Ukraine's Center for Countering Disinformation.
