= Dzerkalo Tyzhnia =

Ukrainian online newspaper

- Type: Weekly newspaper
- Format: Broadsheet (till 2019), on-line
- Editor-in-chief: Yulia Mostova
- Founded: 1994
- Headquarters: 6 Tverska Street, Kyiv
- Circulation: 57,000 (2006)
- ISSN: 1563-6437
- Website: zn.ua

Dzerkalo Tyzhnia (Ukrainian: Дзеркало тижня, pronounced [ˈdzɛrkɐlo ˈtɪʒnʲɐ]), usually referred to in English as the Mirror of the week, is a Ukrainian online newspaper; it was one of Ukraine's most influential analytical weekly-publisher newspapers, founded in 1994. On 27 December 2019 it published its last printed issue, it continued its life as a Ukrainian online newspaper.

As of 2006, its print circulation was 57,000.

Historical logo transliterated from Russian

Dzerkalo Tyzhnia offered political analysis, original interviews, and opinions on 32 pages. Originally published in Russian (hence the Russian-language version of its name, Zerkalo Nedeli; Russian: Зеркало недели), since 2002 it was fully translated for the Ukrainian edition. Since 2001, main articles are also published in an online English-language version. All three language editions and archives are available online.

The paper is nonpartisan, while strongly liberal-leaning by Ukrainian standards. It maintains high journalistic standards. Dzerkalo Tyzhnia is partially funded by Western non-governmental organizations. The paper is widely read and highly regarded among Ukrainian business and political elites which largely explains its political influence.

In 2011, the newspaper changed owners and began to be published under the title «Information and Analytical Weekly "Mirror Weekly. Ukraine"».

On 27 December 2019, the last printed issue of the newspaper was published, with columns written by former Foreign Minister Pavlo Klimkin, oligarchs Victor Pinchuk, Konstantin Grigorishin, journalist Yuriy Butusov, Ihor Kulakov and other politicians, journalists and cultural figures.

The newspaper continues to be published online. In 2014, Yulia Mostovaya, editor-in-chief of the Dzerkalo Tyzhnia, received the Free Media Award.

== See also ==
- List of newspapers in Ukraine
