= Dmitry Gordon =

Ukrainian journalist (born 1967)

- Дмитрий Гордон (Russian); Дмитро Гордон (Ukrainian)
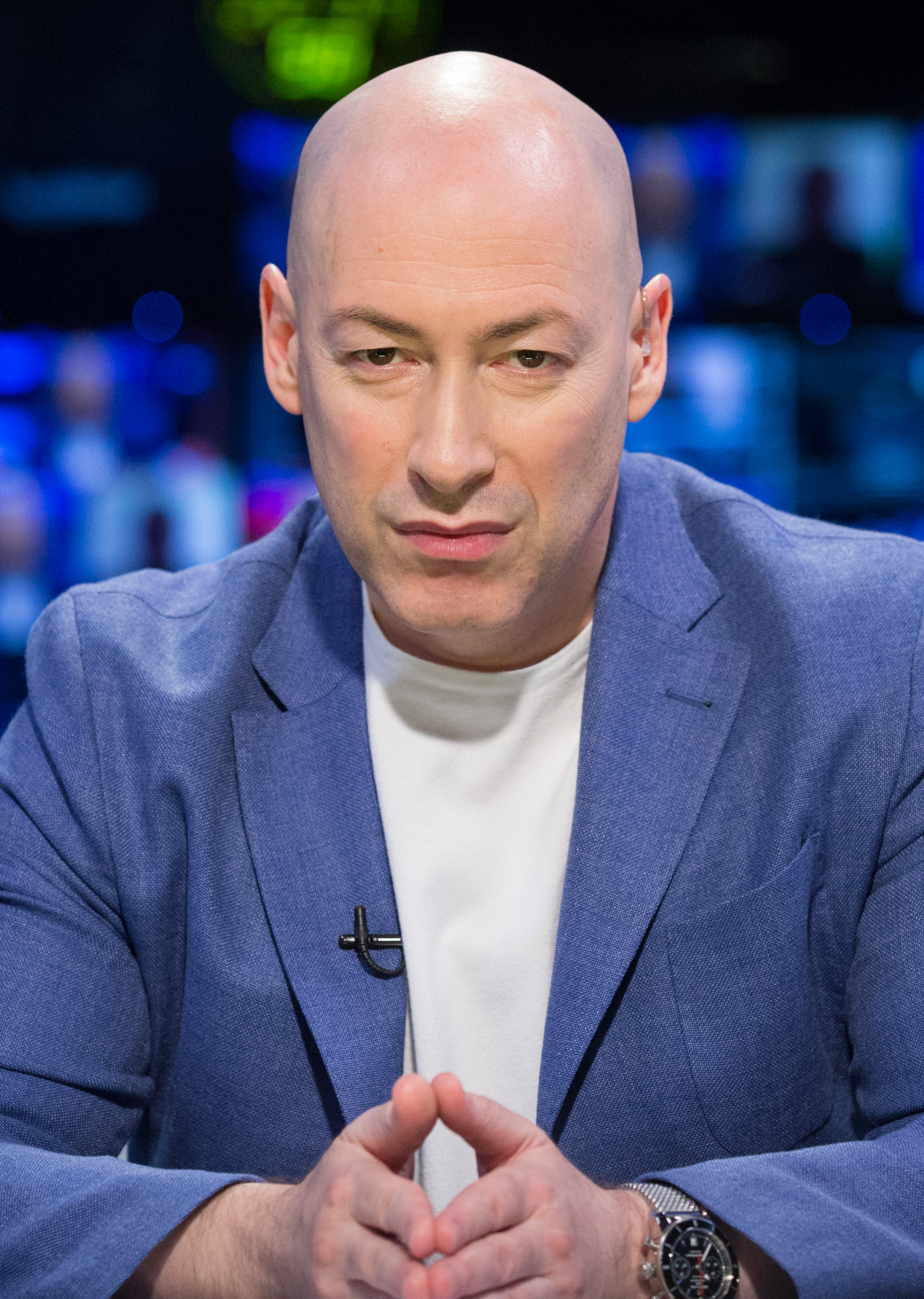
- Gordon in 2018
- Born: Dmitry Ilyich Gordon; 21 October 1967 (age 58); Kyiv, Ukrainian SSR, Soviet Union
- Occupations: Journalist; interviewer; politician
- Years active: 1984–present
- Spouse: Olesia Batsman

Member of the Kyiv City Council
- In office 2014–2016

YouTube information
- Channels: Visiting Gordon; Dmitry Gordon
- Genres: Interview; politics
- Subscribers: 7.9 million
- Views: 4.87 billion
- Last updated: December 2024
- Website: gordonua.com

Signature
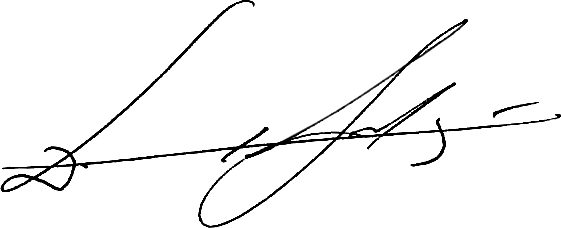

Dmitry Ilyich Gordon (Russian: Дмитрий Ильич Гордон; Dmytro Illich Hordon, Ukrainian: Дмитро Ілліч Гордон, romanized: Dmytro Illich Hordon; born 21 October 1967) is a Ukrainian journalist, TV host, and blogger. From 1995 to 2019, he served as the chief editor of the newspaper Gordon Boulevard and has been hosting the program Visiting Dmytro Gordon since 1996. He is the founder of the online publication GORDON and owns two YouTube channels that have received YouTube's Gold Creator Award for surpassing 1 million subscribers. Between 2014 and 2016, he was a member of the Kyiv City Council. In June 2019, Gordon became the head of the election headquarters of the party Strength and Honor.

Following the Russian invasion of Ukraine, in May 2022, a criminal case was opened by the Russian Investigative Committee against Gordon. He has been added to the list of "foreign agents" in Russia, despite not being a citizen of Russia. Russian authorities accused Gordon of dissemination of fake information about the Russian army. Gordon continues taking a stand against Russia throughout its war, proactively fundraising for the Ukrainian military as well as supporting Ukraine during media appearances.

== Early life and education ==
Gordon was born on October 21, 1967, in Kyiv, Ukraine, into a Jewish family. His father, Illіa Yakovych Gordon, was a civil engineer, and his mother, Mina Davydivna Gordon (1939–2018), was an economic engineer. Dmytro was their only child . His parents eventually emigrated to the United States after winning a Green Card lottery, settling in Boston, Massachusetts, and obtaining U.S. citizenship.

He attended Kyiv schools No. 205 and No. 194. Gordon claims he taught lessons and graded classmates’ work at the request of his third-grade teacher. In fifth grade, he sent letters to 100 Soviet celebrities requesting autographed photos; responses came from famed singers Leonid Utyosov and Joseph Kobzon. Gordon graduated from high school at age 15, skipping the sixth grade by passing exams externally.

Despite his journalism career, Gordon did not formally study the field; he graduated as a civil engineer from Kyiv Civil Engineering Institute in 1988. However, he found little interest in his chosen field, describing his academic years as “torture”. After his third year, Gordon was drafted into the Soviet Army and served two years in tactical missile forces.

== Journalism career ==
At age 16, while in his second year of university studies, Gordon began writing for leading Kyiv newspapers. His first interview, conducted in 1984, was with his idol, the legendary midfielder of the Dynamo Kyiv football club and the USSR national team, Leonid Buriak. This interview was published in the Luhansk-based newspaper Molodohvardiyets (“Young Guard”). During his time at the university, Gordon published his works in some of Ukraine's top newspapers, including Vecherniy Kiev (“Evening Kyiv”), Komsomolskoe Znamya (“Komsomol Banner”), Molod Ukrainy (“Youth of Ukraine”), Sportivnaya Gazeta (“Sports Newspaper”), Sovetskaya Ukraina (“Soviet Ukraine”), Pravda Ukrainy (“Ukraine's Truth”), Rabochaya Gazeta (“Workers’ Newspaper”), Prapor Kommunizma (“Banner of Communism”), and Molodaya Gvardiya (“Young Guard”). Additionally, he collaborated with Komsomolskaya Pravda (“Komsomol Truth”).

Upon graduating from the university, Gordon was assigned to work in the editorial office of the Vecherniy Kiev newspaper. He noted that this was an unprecedented decision by the dean, as Soviet-era distribution policies typically aligned job placements strictly with one's professional specialization.

Gordon worked at Vecherniy Kiev until 1992. He then transitioned to Kievskiye Vedomosti (“Kyiv Gazette”) and later to Vseukrainskiye Vedomosti (“All-Ukrainian Gazette”).

In 1995, the journalist founded his own weekly newspaper, Boulevard (renamed Gordon Boulevard in 2005). Gordon Boulevard became one of the most popular and widely circulated newspapers in Ukraine. According to Gordon, the newspaper reached its highest circulation between 2002 and 2003, with 570,000 copies printed at its peak. The newspaper was distributed not only in Ukraine but also abroad for a period, including in the United States. The editorial board of Boulevard Gordon was chaired by the renowned Ukrainian-Russian poet and journalist Vitaly Korotich. It included notable figures from Ukraine, Russia, and other countries, such as former Ukrainian President Leonid Kravchuk, Russian opposition politician Boris Nemtsov, former Ukrainian football players Andriy Shevchenko and Oleh Blokhin, Ukrainian artists Yevhenia Miroshnychenko, Mykola Mozhovyi, Andriy Danylko, and Sofia Rotaru, Georgian singers Vakhtang Kikabidze, Nani Bregvadze, and Tamara Gverdtsiteli, and Russian performers Muslim Magomayev, Lyudmila Gurchenko, Edita Piekha, among others. In early 2014, the editorial board of Boulevard Gordon was disbanded due to the outbreak of the Russo-Ukrainian war. In 2019, Gordon stepped down as the newspaper's editor-in-chief. He transferred its publishing operations to another company, LLC “Mega-Press Group”.

In 1996, Gordon began recording television interviews under the title “Visiting Dmytro Gordon”. From 1996 to 2008 and again from 2010 to 2015, the program aired on Ukraine's First National channel (currently Ukraine's public broadcaster). Over the years, the show was also broadcast on other Ukrainian television channels, including Tonis, Central Channel, 3s.tv, and 112 Ukraine. From 2017 to 2019, the program aired on 112 Ukraine, but in May 2019, Gordon announced that he and his wife, journalist Olesia Batsman, would terminate their cooperation with the channel due to its ties to Viktor Medvedchuk, a Ukrainian politician and close associate of Russian President Vladimir Putin. Medvedchuk has been accused of high treason in Ukraine and, following Russia's full-scale invasion, was handed over to Russia in a prisoner exchange for soldiers of Ukraine's Azov Brigade. He was also stripped of his Ukrainian citizenship. After ending his association with 112 Ukraine, Gordon stopped appearing on its talk shows and later ceased collaborations with NewsOne and ZIK, two other channels linked to Medvedchuk's network . Gordon's program now exclusively airs on YouTube.

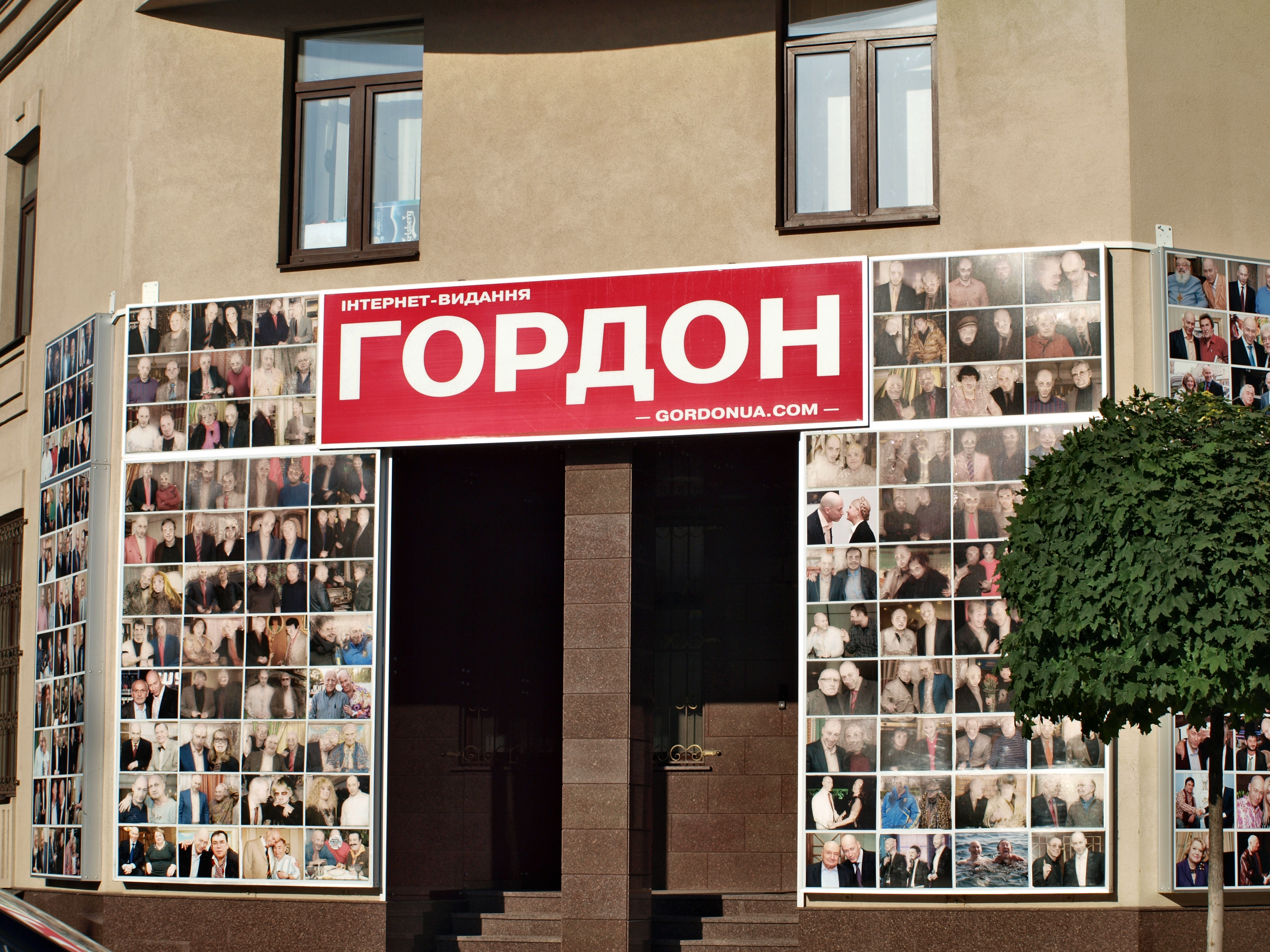
GORDON publication's headquarters, Kyiv, June 2019

In November 2013, at the start of mass protests in Ukraine that escalated into the Revolution of Dignity, Gordon launched the online publication GORDON. Today, the outlet is one of Ukraine's most popular internet media platforms. The editor-in-chief of GORDON is his wife, Olesia Batsman.

=== YouTube Projects ===
Gordon runs two YouTube channels: Dmytro Gordon (founded in 2011) and Visiting Gordon (founded in 2012). These channels feature interviews conducted by Gordon, Olesia Batsman, and other journalists from Gordon's team, livestreams where Gordon comments on significant events in Ukraine and the world, answers viewers’ questions, and interviews he gives to other platforms. As of June 2024, the Dmytro Gordon channel has 3.48 million subscribers, while Visiting Gordon has 4.42 million subscribers. In 2020, the channels received YouTube's Gold Creator Awards for surpassing one million subscribers.

Gordon's interviews have repeatedly ranked among the top 10 most popular videos of the year in Ukraine and other countries, according to Google. In 2020, his interview with Andriy Bohdan, former head of the Office of the President of Ukraine, was among Ukraine's top 10 YouTube videos of the year, while his interview with Belarus president Alexander Lukashenko ranked in Belarus. In 2021, his interview with Russian rapper Morgenshtern ranked among Ukraine's most popular videos.

As of November 2024, Gordon has conducted over 1,400 interviews, including with 14 current and former heads of state. These include former Ukrainian Presidents Leonid Kravchuk and Viktor Yushchenko, current President Volodymyr Zelenskyy, former UK Prime Minister Boris Johnson, former Polish Presidents Aleksander Kwaśniewski and Bronisław Komorowski, former Latvian President Egils Levits, former Estonian President Kersti Kaljulaid, current Moldovan President Maia Sandu, former Georgian Presidents Eduard Shevardnadze and Mikheil Saakashvili, former Belarusian leader Stanislav Shushkevich and current leader Alexander Lukashenko, and former Soviet President Mikhail Gorbachev.

In 2019, before the presidential elections in Ukraine, Gordon conducted an interview with Volodymyr Zelenskyy, founder of the Kvartal 95 studio and actor. During this interview, Zelenskyy effectively admitted for the first time that he would run for president. Critics described this interview as a “programmatic” one, where Zelenskyy outlined his plans as president.

According to Gordon, his most memorable interview was with Soviet caricaturist Boris Yefimov. At the time of the interview, Yefimov was 107 years old; he died at 108.

In January 2022, Gordon and Batsman launched their political talk show on YouTube, titled GORDON. Gordon declared it to be the world's first political talk show exclusively on YouTube. The program aired weekly, featuring studio guests discussing current political and social issues. The first episode, released on January 27, gained over 1 million views within 24 hours and became one of the most popular videos in the Ukrainian segment of YouTube. By February 24, 2022, when Russia launched its full-scale invasion of Ukraine, four episodes had aired before the show was temporarily halted.

Gordon is the most popular political YouTube blogger in Ukraine. According to an analysis by the portal “Slovo i Dilo” for 2022, Gordon topped the rankings of Ukrainian YouTube bloggers covering the Russian-Ukrainian war, boasting the largest audience. His channels ranked first and second in terms of total views, with approximately 2.6 billion combined. Gordon's two channels had more views than the rest of the bloggers in the top ten combined. He was also the only Ukrainian blogger whose channel surpassed 1 billion views. In 2023, his channels ranked second and third in a similar ranking, while in 2024, they ranked first and third.

Gordon has also consistently ranked among the most popular bloggers in Ukraine, according to public opinion polls conducted by the international non-governmental organization Internews with support from the U.S. Agency for International Development (USAID). In 2021, Gordon topped the rankings, with 18% of respondents in Ukraine stating they read or watched his social media content. In 2022, he placed second. He also featured in similar rankings in 2023 and 2024. Additionally, in 2023, Ukrainians in liberated and frontline regions named Gordon among the public figures they trusted the most, with 7% of respondents in a Kyiv International Institute of Sociology survey (conducted with USAID support) selecting him.

=== Svoboda Satellite Package project ===
In March 2024 an international non-governmental organisation Reporters Without Borders officially launched the Svoboda Satellite Package project. Nine Russian-speaking TV and radio channels, in particular the Gordon Live channel, were being broadcast to territories including Russia, occupied territories of Ukraine and Baltic countries. Batsman and Gordon interviews are shown on a 24/7 basis as well as content from their YouTube channels. The presentation of the project was hosted in Brussels at the European Parliament with participation and support from Věra Jourová, vice-president of the European Commission. This project will be accessible to 61 million households in total, in particular to 4.5 million households in the Russian Federation and about 800 thousand in the occupied territories of Ukraine. Its primary objective is to provide people with high-quality information, in addition to the fight against Russian propaganda, said the former secretary general of Reporters Without Borders Christophe Deloire along with Svoboda project director Jim Phillipoff during an interview with Batsman. "We want to reverse the logic of propaganda. We do not want to fight propaganda with propaganda. It's not a very effective remedy. We want to have independent journalism to be broadcast to an audience living under propaganda regimes", — explained Deloire.

== Politics ==
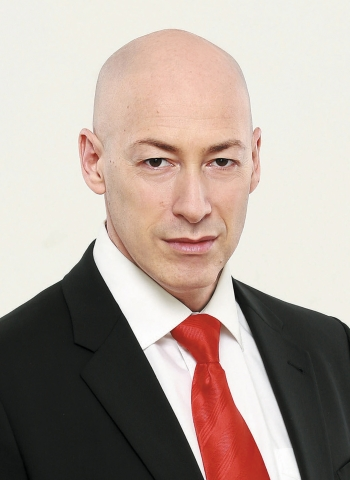
Gordon's official Kyiv City Council portrait, 2014

In 2014, during local elections, Dmytro Gordon was elected as a deputy of the Kyiv City Council, running as an independent candidate. He was re-elected in 2015. However, in 2016, he voluntarily resigned from his position, citing dissatisfaction with the “destructive and ruinous behavior” of some council members and factions. Gordon expressed frustration over the actions of deputies who prioritized personal interests over those of Kyiv residents and accused them of attempting to “line their own pockets.” He stated he did not wish to be part of such activities.

In 2014, Gordon also ran as an independent candidate for the Verkhovna Rada (Ukraine's Parliament) in a Kyiv constituency but failed to secure a seat, finishing second. He alleged that his competitors employed vote-buying and smear campaigns, including distributing fake leaflets suggesting he had withdrawn from the race in favor of a rival.

Following this experience, Gordon announced he no longer intended to participate in any elections or hold political office.

During Ukraine's 2019 presidential elections, Gordon publicly endorsed Ihor Smeshko, a former head of Ukraine's Defense Intelligence and the Security Service of Ukraine (SBU). Throughout the campaign, Gordon hosted Smeshko multiple times on his program and actively encouraged voters to support him. He clarified that this support was expressed not as a journalist but as a private citizen. Smeshko ultimately finished sixth in the election, garnering 6.04% of the vote (over 1.1 million votes). Gordon praised the campaign for being one of the most economical in Ukraine's history, costing just 1.8 million UAH (approximately $65,000 at the time). The Committee of Voters of Ukraine calculated the cost per vote for each candidate in the 2019 presidential election. It was found that Ihor Smeshko's campaign had the lowest cost per vote at just 4 UAH (approximately $0.15 at the time). In contrast, the highest cost per vote was incurred by independent candidate Roman Nasirov, at 997 UAH (around $35).

Many political analysts attributed Smeshko's relative success in the election to the support and active campaigning efforts of Dmytro Gordon.

During the 2019 snap parliamentary elections, Gordon led the campaign headquarters of Smeshko's political party, “Strength and Honor” (Syla i Chest). The party fell short of the 5% threshold required to enter parliament, receiving 3.82% of the vote.

In October 2021, Gordon was denied entry to Georgia, where he had intended to meet imprisoned former President Mikheil Saakashvil. After an hour of waiting at passport control in Tbilisi Airport, he was informed of the ban without being given a reason. Gordon linked the incident to his support for Saakashvili, describing it as an “international scandal” and an embarrassment for the Georgian authorities. The international organization Reporters Without Borders urged the Georgian government to respect journalists’ rights and provide a clear explanation for the denial. A senior member of Georgia's ruling party suggested Gordon's visit might have been intended to “escalate tensions and create scandal,” although the authorities never officially commented on the matter. In one of the broadcasts on the Georgian channel Formula, then-Prime Minister Irakli Garibashvili was asked 17 times why Dmytro Gordon was denied entry to the country. However, he repeatedly avoided providing a clear answer to the question.

In December 2021, a Razumkov Center poll revealed Gordon as the most trusted public figure in Ukraine among non-political personalities. The study indicated he would win a hypothetical presidential election if active politicians were excluded from the race.

== Business ==
Dmytro Gordon describes himself as a wealthy person. According to the journalist, he earned his first significant income in the late 1980s by organizing concerts featuring show business stars. In an interview with businessman Yevhen Cherniak, Gordon detailed how the system worked: for example, concerts were held at Kyiv's Palace of Sports, which could accommodate 10,000 attendees. Ticket prices reached up to 10 rubles. Per the cooperative law, 20% of the profits were allocated to the state, while the remaining amount was divided among the artist, the administration, cashiers, and was also used to cover advertising and rental expenses. Gordon claims that in 1989–1991, his apartment was filled with “bags of money” from this venture. Later, he invested the money earned into real estate, purchasing apartments and commercial spaces, which he either sells or rents out.

== Views and criticism of Russia ==
Gordon has been a vocal critic of the Soviet Union, stating that he welcomed its collapse. He considers the 70 years of the USSR's existence as a period of genocide against its own population.

Gordon supported both the Orange Revolution (2004–2005) and the Euromaidan (2013–2014) in Ukraine. On November 24, 2004, after Ukraine's Central Election Commission announced then-Prime Minister Viktor Yanukovych as the winner of the presidential election, Gordon appeared live on the opposition's Channel 5, urging Ukrainians to gather on Maidan Square to support opposition candidate Viktor Yushchenko. During the 2014 protests, he opposed negotiations between the opposition and then-President Yanukovych. On February 21, 2014, before Yanukovych was ousted, Gordon criticized the agreement between the opposition and the president for early elections, saying: “Today, the opposition signed an agreement with Yanukovych about early elections at the end of the year, and I wonder: so, all this time, the president of my country will remain a person who drowned Kyiv in blood? Why do I need such a president?” He further added, “And why do I need such an opposition? To hell with all of them!”.

Gordon also called for Yanukovych to be brought to Maidan in a cage.

Gordon considers Leonid Kuchma to be the best president in Ukraine's history, believing that under Kuchma, Ukraine experienced “the best 10 years of its 30 years of independence.”.

Dmytro Gordon has consistently criticized the policies of Russian President Vladimir Putin regarding Ukraine throughout the years of Russian aggression. In 2019, during a live broadcast on the Russian state television channel Rossiya 1, Gordon publicly called Putin a criminal. Shortly thereafter, Russian television channels ceased inviting him to appear as a guest.

Before Russia's full-scale invasion of Ukraine, Gordon differentiated between the Russian state and the Russian people. He referred to the Russian state as an enemy but claimed to have a positive attitude towards Russians. However, following the invasion, his rhetoric changed. He labeled Russians as “genetic slaves” who even protest on their knees and wished for the Russian people to “plunge into chaos, poverty, and hunger as penance for their sins.”.

=== Russian invasion of Ukraine ===
From the first days of the Russian invasion of Ukraine in February 2022, Gordon actively used social media and YouTube to criticize Russia's actions and leadership, highlighting crimes committed by Russian troops in Ukraine. He was one of the first to warn about the illegal establishment of filtration camps by Russian forces for Ukrainians leaving occupied territories. These camps, reminiscent of those operated by the Soviet NKVD, reportedly involved torture. A video covering these allegations on Gordon's YouTube channel “Visiting Gordon” garnered over 1.6 million views.

Just 15 minutes after Russia launched its full-scale war, Gordon uploaded a video to YouTube urging Ukrainians to defend their homeland. Hours later, he addressed the Russian public, calling on opinion leaders to oppose the war and urging the mothers of Russian soldiers to prevent their sons from being sent to kill Ukrainians.

On February 13, 2022, just 11 days before the full-scale invasion, Gordon recorded a video message from Kyiv's center directed at Putin and the Russian people. The video has amassed over 3.1 million views. Addressing Putin, Gordon vowed that Ukrainians would defend their country and homes, stating, “We are not going anywhere.” He also called on Russians not to allow their children to be used in the war as “cannon fodder.”

Dmytro Gordon has repeatedly called on Russians to leave Ukraine, referring to Vladimir Putin as a “fascist” and a “paranoid madman”. He argued that Putin made a fatal mistake by starting the war against Ukraine, believing that “Ukrainians would raise a white flag and greet the invaders with bread and salt,” only to ultimately suffer defeat. Gordon expressed his desire for Putin to live to face trial and “burn in hell”. Furthermore, he believes that not only Putin but also Russian propagandists, such as Vladimir Solovyov, who incited hatred toward Ukrainians, should be brought to justice.

Gordon has described Russia as a “deeply ill Nazi and fascist country” lacking ideology or a national idea. He predicted that after Russia's defeat in the war against Ukraine, a civil war could erupt within the country. However, he emphasized that his remarks are not an expression of Russophobia but rather “a sober perspective.” He stated, “If a country is made up of criminals and fools, this is not Russophobia but a medical fact”.

Russian and Belarusian authorities have persecuted citizens for sharing Gordon's statements, including under criminal charges. In May 2022, a resident of Saint Petersburg, Viktoria Petrova, was arrested in Russia for allegedly spreading “fake news” about the Russian army after posting anti-war content on the social network VKontakte, which included videos from Gordon's YouTube channel. In December 2023, a Russian court ordered her to undergo compulsory psychiatric treatment. She was released in August 2024.

In Belarus, a court sentenced a resident of the Zhitkovichi District to 1.5 years in a penal colony in February 2023 for sharing one of Gordon's videos on VKontakte. In the video, Gordon addressed Putin and Belarusian President Alexander Lukashenko, saying, “Burn in hell, devils!” The court ruled that this statement insulted the presidents of the two countries.

Additionally, in November 2022, Russian musician Andrei Makarevich was designated a “foreign agent” in Russia after giving an interview to Gordon.

In January 2023, Yevgeny Prigozhin, the founder of the Wagner private military company involved in Russia's war against Ukraine, stated that Russia was planning to ban YouTube, partly because of Gordon. Prigozhin claimed that 40% of the content on YouTube is politicized and directed against Russia, criticizing Russians who listen to “the narratives of Ukrainian leaders” on the platform, including Gordon and Russian lawyer and blogger Mark Feygin.

In response, Gordon noted that Prigozhin “did the right thing” by referring to him as a Ukrainian leader. At that time, Gordon had two YouTube channels with a combined 6 million subscribers and billions of views. He stated that his audience spans many countries and that his voice carries significant weight.

=== Conflict with Russian propagandist Solovyov ===
From 2019 to 2020, a public feud unfolded between Dmytro Gordon and Vladimir Solovyov, one of Russia's most prominent propagandists.

The conflict began in September 2019, when Solovyov criticized Gordon on his program on the “Russia 1” television channel. The criticism was triggered by Gordon's statement about the existence of the so-called “Novorossiya plan,” which alleged that in 2014, Russia had planned to seize parts of southern and eastern Ukraine but ultimately failed. Solovyov dismissed the claim as slander and suggested that Gordon should be prosecuted, adding that he “disgraces a good Jewish surname”.

In response, Gordon called Solovyov a “rabid propagandist” and regarded the insults directed at him as a “badge of honor.” He suggested that Solovyov should examine his own hands, “stained with the blood of Ukrainians and Russians who went to war under the influence of his vile propaganda,” and accused him of valuing “not Russia, but dollar bills with the faces of American presidents”.

Solovyov subsequently escalated the feud, repeatedly insulting Gordon on air. He referred to the Ukrainian journalist as a “mediocrity”, a “scoundrel”, a “Nazi filth”, a “degenerate,” an “idiot,” and a “Russophobe”, while also criticizing his use of the Russian language.

Gordon responded with video rebuttals. He accused Solovyov of being a “completely unprincipled person” who prioritized money above all else. Gordon claimed that the deaths of Ukrainian soldiers were a direct result of Solovyov's “pathetic programs,” calling him “the leader of Russia's information special forces”, a “beast,” a “scoundrel,” and a “criminal”. Gordon also suggested that Solovyov needed “immediate medical attention”.

Despite the animosity, Gordon remarked that he found it “pleasant” that Solovyov frequently mentioned him on air. “If such filth speaks ill of me, it means I'm not completely lost as a person,” he said in May 2020.

In July 2020, Gordon composed a satirical song titled Italian Partisan, inspired by the song Komarovo by Russian singer Igor Nikolayev. In the song, he mockingly referred to Solovyov as “nightingale droppings”. The music video gained over 1 million views before YouTube blocked it in early 2021, citing a copyright claim from Nikolayev. Gordon speculated that Nikolayev filed the complaint at Solovyov's request.

Even after the peak of their feud, Gordon continued to criticize Solovyov publicly. He described him as the “lowest of the low,” emphasizing that Solovyov's primary motivation was money.

== Volunteer Activities ==
Following the full-scale invasion of Ukraine by Russia, journalist Dmytro Gordon initiated efforts to raise funds for DJI Mavic 3 reconnaissance drones to support Ukraine's defense forces. To finance the purchase of these drones, he uses his personal funds, a portion of the proceeds from the sale of his humorous merchandise at the Gordon Shop, and donations collected through his social media followers and audience. Initially, Gordon expressed his goal to procure 100 drones. By winter 2023, 100 drones had been delivered to the military. However, Gordon continued fundraising efforts, and as of October 2024, he had donated 200 drones to Ukraine's armed forces. He plans to continue these efforts.

According to Gordon's wife, Olesia Batsman, approximately $450,000 has been allocated for the purchase of 200 drones. Gordon coordinates the delivery of drones with the leadership of the Ukrainian military. He revealed that Ukraine's General Staff specifically advised him to procure DJI Mavic drones due to the high demand for reconnaissance equipment on the frontlines.

== Persecution in Russia ==
On March 21, 2022, the Main Investigative Department of the IC of Russia initiated a criminal case against Dmitry Gordon. He was accused of public calls to unleash an aggressive war, actions aimed at inciting hatred or enmity on the grounds of nationality, and public dissemination of allegedly deliberately false information about the actions of the Armed Forces of the Russian Federation. Gordon responded to Vladimir Putin, the Russian President, stating: ”Vladimir Putin, you will not intimidate either Ukraine or me! The criminal here is not me! The Nazi criminal is you! And you will sit in the same tribunal where the Nazis sat!,” he said.

On April 6, 2022, it was announced that the journalist had been included in a list of individuals and organizations deemed by Russia to be involved in extremist activities or terrorism, and on April 28 the Chairman of the Investigative Committee of Russia Oleksandr Bastrykin instructed to study and analyze the content of the books written by Gordon. According to the journalist, he was generally surprised to learn that his books were sold in Russia.

It became known on July 19, 2022 that Russia's police force has added Dmitry Gordon to its wanted list, and two days later a court in Moscow arrested him in absentia. Gordon responded by saying that after Russia's attack on Ukraine and the occupation of Crimea he has been fighting against the Russian Federation in the information field for many years, thus, the decision of the Ministry of Internal Affairs of Russia did not come as a surprise to him, and added, ”I don't care about them, they can kiss my ass. They put me on the wanted list… With the same success, I'm putting the Ministry of Internal Affairs of Russia on the wanted list”.

In January 2024, it became known that a new criminal case had been opened against Gordon in Russia, allegedly for “public calls to terrorism,” and he was again put on the wanted list.

On July 1, 2024, the 2nd Western District Military Court in Moscow sentenced Gordon in absentia to 14 years in prison on all charges. Judge Roman Kiforenko ruled that Gordon must serve the first three years in prison, with the remainder of the sentence to be served in a general-regime colony. Additionally, Gordon was banned from administering internet resources for three years. The court stated that the sentence would come into effect “after Gordon's arrest on Russian territory or his extradition to Russia.” During the trial, it was revealed that the case against Gordon was based on three videos he posted on his YouTube channels in 2022. According to the prosecution, in these videos, he allegedly “called for the killings of Putin and Lukashenko” and urged the U.S. to start a nuclear war against Russia. Commenting on the court's decision, Gordon said that his media platforms are working for Ukraine's victory in the war. “I thank Russia for such a high recognition of my services to my country. Yes, I have hurt Russia and will continue to do so,” the journalist emphasized.

Reporters Without Borders condemned the Russian court's verdict against Gordon, calling the trial a “legal farce.” They noted that the Russian authorities aim to intimidate journalists who publish independent information about Russia's invasion of Ukraine.

On September 2, 2022, Gordon was included in Russia's registry of individuals labeled as “foreign agents”. Commenting on the Russian Ministry of Justice's decision, Gordon said, “They've completely lost their minds in Moscow. Are they out of their heads? I can't be a ‘foreign agent,’ I'm not a citizen of the Russian Federation.”.

Gordon stated that he is the only person in Ukraine against whom Russia has taken such a wide range of measures. He explained that his online platforms—YouTube channels, social media pages, and the website “GORDON”—have a combined audience of over 10 million people. “For eight years, I have consistently fought against the Kremlin and Putin. My word, or the word of those I invite for interviews, has a huge impact. That's why I'm enemy number one for Putin and the Kremlin,” he said.

In September 2022, Gordon filed a lawsuit against Russia with the European Court of Human Rights He asked the court to declare his criminal prosecution unjust “for direct, truthful statements about Russia's aggression against Ukraine”. “If the European Court recognizes violations of the European Convention on Human Rights by Russia, it will essentially confirm that the direct, radical statements of Ukrainians against Russia are justified and permissible from the perspective of international law,” the journalist explained. In February 2025, Gordon won his case against Russia at the ECHR. The court unanimously ruled that in the case of Gordon and the other applicants, Russia had violated Article 10 of the European Convention on Human Rights, which guarantees freedom of expression. In its judgment, the court stated that Gordon’s remarks about Russia must be assessed in their proper context, noting that they were made while Russia was attacking Ukrainian cities and civilians were being killed. Moreover, the court emphasized that his statements were specifically directed at the Russian military and political leadership responsible for initiating the war, not at the Russian population as a whole. The ECHR concluded that the purpose of Russia’s prosecution of Gordon was not to prevent incitement to violence, but to suppress any criticism of its military actions. Thus, the ruling set a precedent regarding statements about Russian aggression, as the court determined that even harsh remarks made by journalists about Russia and its president must be considered within the context in which they were made.

=== FSB assassination plot ===
In September 2024, the Security Service of Ukraine (SBU) announced the exposure of a spy network linked to an elite unit of Russia's FSB, which operated in Kyiv and, among other things, was planning to assassinate Gordon. According to the security services, the network was coordinated by a former member of the banned Party of Regions. Media reports suggest this refers to Vitaly Hrushevsky, a former MP who served from 2012 to 2014. Later, the SBU confirmed this information. Hrushevsky and three other suspects were arrested. The SBU released correspondence from the case, in which one of the figures asked for images of Gordon's house.

The journalist is convinced that the order to kill him was personally given by Putin, as “such actions are never carried out without orders from the top leader”. He emphasized that, because of his journalism, he is one of Russia's main enemies, but the actions of Russian intelligence will neither intimidate nor stop him. “I stand for truth, my country, and my confidence that the Russians will not win in the end. We are on our land and destined for victory,” Gordon said.

In June 2025, SBU reported that it had uncovered a second group of FSB agents who were preparing an assassination attempt on Gordon.

According to the SBU, the group was organized by a 36-year-old Russian citizen from the North Caucasus. To maintain cover, Russian intelligence agencies fabricated criminal charges against him and put him on a wanted list. He arrived in Ukraine before Russia’s full-scale invasion, posing as a political exile, and began a relationship with the daughter of a former high-ranking Ukrainian Interior Ministry official. When the man found agents, he used FSB money to buy several cars, disguised them as a taxi service, and equipped them with hidden video recorders. The main suspect, according to investigators, created four agent-combat groups that used these vehicles to surveil Gordon in order to determine his daily routine, the places he frequently visits, and whether he had security. According to the FSB’s plan, Gordon was to be shot with a firearm. As stated by SBU head Vasyl Malyuk, if the journalist was alone, they intended to kill him with a handgun; if accompanied by a guard — with an automatic weapon, “and then finish him off with a pistol”. After the attack, according to the SBU, the killer was supposed to quickly flee the scene on a motorcycle. The coordinator and all members of the agent-combat groups were detained. According to the SBU, the FSB promised them $400,000 for Gordon’s assassination.

Malyuk explained why Russian intelligence agencies are specifically targeting Gordon. He emphasized that the journalist “triggers the Russians”. The head of the SBU noted that Gordon has a very large audience, including in Russia and in the occupied territories of Ukraine. “He works a lot, many people have watched and continue to watch. He expresses pro-Ukrainian views sincerely and openly, which he “pulls” over the heads of Russians. Our Gordon triggers them specifically. The Putin regime considers him the main propagandist of Ukraine”, Malyuk said.

Malyuk also reported that in 2023, Russian President Vladimir Putin signed a decree instructing the organization of terrorist acts in Ukraine, including against Gordon, in order to “create diversionary noise” within Ukraine.

Reporters Without Borders condemned the assassination attempts against Gordon and called for a thorough investigation to identify those responsible for organizing them.

== Creative works ==
=== Writing ===
Gordon has authored and published books containing his interviews, totaling 57 volumes, including the eight-volume series Heroes of a Troubled Time. However, he eventually ceased publishing books.

=== Film ===
In 2009, Gordon appeared in a minor role in the film DAU by Russian director Ilya Khrzhanovsky, which depicted the life of Soviet physicist Lev Landau. Gordon played a Red Army brigade commander. In 2021, he appeared as himself in the Ukrainian comedy "Neighbor".

== Personal life ==
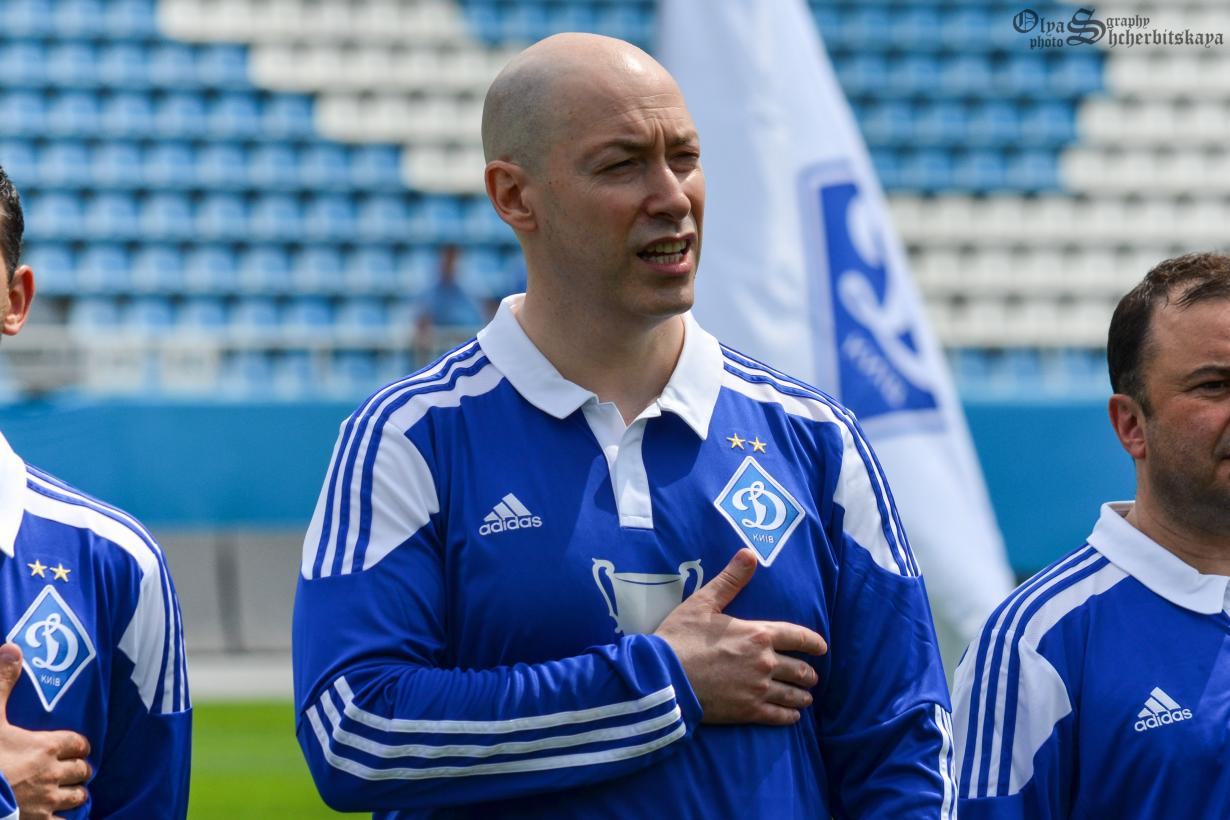
Gordon sings the national anthem with the FC Dynamo Kyiv, May 2016

Gordon is married to well-known Ukrainian journalist, TV presenter, and editor-in-chief of the online publication GORDON, Olesia Batsman, whom he met during an interview. They have three daughters together: Santa (born in 2012), Alisa (2016), and Liana (2019). From previous relationships, Gordon has four older children: three sons and a daughter — Rostyslav (born in 1992), Dmytro (1995), Yelyzaveta (1999), and Lev (2001). Rostyslav graduated from the Kyiv Institute of International Relations and is passionate about photography. Dmytro Jr. is a composer who graduated from the Berklee College of Music in Boston.

== Bibliography ==
- Yunakov, Oleg (2016). Architect Joseph Karakis (in Russian). Almaz. ISBN 978-1-68082-000-3.
