= Segodnya =

Segodnya may refer to:

- Segodnya (TV program), a Russian information program of the NTV
- Segodnya (1919), a Latvian Russian-language newspaper from 1919 to 1940
- Segodnya (1997), a Ukrainian Russian-language newspaper from 1997 to 2019
  - Segodnya Multimedia Publishing Group
- Segodnya (1999), a Latvian Russian-language newspaper
