= Segodnya (1997) =

Russian-language Ukrainian tabloid newspaper founded in 1997

Logo of Segodnya in Cyrillic script

Today (Russian: Сегодня, romanized: Segodnya; Ukrainian: Сьогодні, romanized: Siohodni) was a Russian-language Ukrainian tabloid newspaper founded in 1997. The newspaper ceased printing in 2019.

== Affiliations ==
While run from Kyiv, it was linked to Donbas political and business groups. Its holding company, Segodnya Multimedia Publishing Group, was owned by Rinat Akhmetov's Ukraina Media Group. The paper supported former Prime Minister Viktor Yanukovych for the presidency in 2004. Since the "Orange Revolution", the newspaper has moderated its pro-Eastern reporting under pressure from its own journalists. The last print edition was issued in 2019. In July 2022, Akhmetov folded all his media business due to the entering into force of the anti-oligarch law.

Segodnya was a member of the Ukrainian Association of Press Publishers.

== Censorship ==
In 2011, the paper's journalists threatened to go on strike after Chief Editor Ihor Guzhva was controversially fired, and his replacement censored certain types of stories, and dictated to journalists how certain politicians and public figures should be covered. "Olena Hromnytska is trying to implement corruption schemes for publishing paid articles ... and also to introduce censorship in the newspaper" the journalists' statement read. In particular, the statement said she ordered some stories removed from the website about Odesa Mayor Oleksiy Kostusev and presidential adviser Hanna Herman. She also mandated favorable coverage of certain politicians and public figures, the journalists say. The newspaper was even accused of publishing forged documents.

== See also ==
- List of newspapers in Ukraine
