= Ukraine (TV channel) =

Ukraina
- Country: Ukraine
- Broadcast area: Ukraine
- Headquarters: Donetsk (1993—2009); Kyiv (2009—2022)

Programming
- Languages: Ukrainian; Russian
- Picture format: 1080i HDTV (downscaled to 16:9 576i for the SDTV screen)

Ownership
- Owner: Media Group Ukraine (owns 99.93% of shares)
- Sister channels: Domestic: Ukraina 24; NLO TV; Indigo TV; Football TV Channel; Donbas; Kanal 34; International: Ukraina 1; Ukraina 2; NLO TV 1; NLO TV 2

History
- Launched: March 13, 1993
- Founder: Donetsk City Council
- Closed: July 22, 2022, 10:00 AM
- Replaced by: My-Ukraina; My-Ukraina+

Links
- Website: kanalukraina.tv

Availability

Terrestrial
- Digital terrestrial television: MX-1 (2)

Ukraina (Ukrainian: Україна), officially TRC Ukraina (ТРК «Україна»), was a national Ukrainian-language television channel owned by Media Group Ukraine. It began broadcasting as a regional Donetsk channel on March 13, 1993, gaining national status in 2004. It ceased broadcasting on July 22, 2022. The channel aired TV shows and films, both domestic and foreign.

== History ==
The channel was established in Donetsk in March 1993 as the state utility company Doka-TV. The operator was under Donetsk City Council. The channel started broadcasting in Donetsk on Channel 7, where it shared time with other TV companies, ASKET 7x7 and Sket.

By the end of the 1990s, ASKET TV was bought out by a corporation owned by tycoon Rinat Akhmetov. The new owners of ASKET TV offered to unite with Doka-TV on mutually beneficial terms. In March 2001, the joint-stock company TRK Ukraina was established; it received a license for a channel in Donetsk, and later for a number of channels in Donetsk and Luhansk regions. At that time, Akhmetov's SCM group owned 75% of the channel's shares. In 2007, SCM became the owner of 99%, and in 2010 it owned 100% of the channel's shares.

In 2002–2003, the company continued its active development, receiving more than a hundred television frequencies throughout Ukraine, including VHF channel 11 in Kyiv, where the channel began broadcasting in June 2003. In the same year, the channel also started broadcasting via satellite. In April 2003, TRK Ukraina became one of the most accessible packages of the Kyiv cable operator Volia. In 2004 during the Orange Revolution, TRK Ukraina was associated as the media resource of Viktor Yanukovych's pro-Russian camp and seen as sharing the ideology of the Party of Regions (and later the Opposition Bloc) and promoting Rinat Akhmetov for president. Moreover, in the same year, the channel received national status.

In 2008, Media Group Ukraine was founded, launching the sports channel Football TV. In the autumn of 2009, TRK Ukraina moved their broadcasting facilities to Kyiv. In 2010, the channel was rebranded to "Ukraine", dropping "TRK".

In 2013, the channel officially signed the agreement to broadcast the UEFA Euro 2016 and FIFA World Cup 2018. In 2020, the channel officially broadcast in high definition.

On July 11, 2022, Rinat Akhmetov, the beneficial owner of Media Group Ukraine, returned the licenses of all media assets of the media group to the state. The station stopped broadcasting on 22 July 2022 at 10:00 a.m. Kyiv Time. According to an official statement, the group returned the licenses due to a new oligarch law in Ukraine. On 21 July 2022, the National Council of Television and Radio Broadcasting of Ukraine (NRADA) had canceled the licenses of the eight television channels of Media Group Ukraine. On 18 October 2022, its previous team launched the successor channels My-Ukraina followed by My-Ukraina+ in 2024.

=== Language share ===
In 2003, in a document of the Accounting Chamber of Ukraine, it was stated that NRADA should force the channel to broadcast in Ukrainian, and that the reason for the lack of Ukrainian-language broadcasting was the lack of control over their compliance by NRADA. In 2014, after the Euromaidan protests and the reduction of Russian culture, the channel equally shifted the use of the Ukrainian language to promote national identity.

== Programming ==
=== News/talk ===
- Today (Сьогодні) – news program
- Today: Results (Сьогодні. Підсумки) – daily talk
- Morning with Ukraine (Ранок з Україною) – morning show
- Ukraine Speaks (Говорить Україна) – talk show

=== Infotainment ===
- Star Trek (Зірковий шлях) – business
- The Main Theme (Головна тема) – scope program

=== Entertainment ===
- The Masked Singer Ukraine – detective game show
- Snivayutb Vsi – musical game show
- Agents of Justice (Агенти справедливості) – crime drama
- Real Mysticism (Зірковий шлях) – drama

== See also ==
- Television in Ukraine
- Language policy in Ukraine
