= NLO TV =

- Country: Ukraine
- Broadcast area: Ukraine
- Headquarters: Kyiv, Ukraine

Programming
- Languages: Ukrainian; Russian
- Picture format: 1080i HDTV (downscaled to 16:9 576i for the SDTV screen)

Ownership
- Owner: Media Group Ukraine (TOV "TRK-Ukraina")
- Sister channels: Domestic: Ukraina; Ukraina 24; Indigo TV; Football TV Channel; Donbas; Kanal 34; International: Ukraina 1; Ukraina 2; NLO TV 1; NLO TV 2

History
- Launched: February 6, 2012
- Closed: July 22, 2022, 10:00 AM

Availability

Terrestrial
- Digital terrestrial television: MX-3

NLO TV (Ukrainian: НЛО TV) was a Ukrainian youth entertainment TV channel. The target audience was people aged 14–35. The coverage of the channel was 80% of the territory of Ukraine.

The TV channel was part of the media conglomerate "Media Group Ukraine", the shareholder of which was the company "System Capital Management". The channel closed alongside all remaining MGU channels in July 2022.

== History ==
It became known about the appearance of the TV channel back in 2011, when applications were being accepted for vacancies in the digital terrestrial digital (DVB-T2). Candidates for digital slots from "Media Group Ukraine" were the channels "Ukraine", "Kinotochka" ("Indigo TV"), "NLO-TV", "Novyny" and "Sport" (the last two channels did not appear). The TV channel started broadcasting on February 6, 2012, in the T2 channel, in the third multiplex. Broadcasting is also carried out in the networks of cable providers of digital and analog television.

On December 15, 2012, it changed its Ukrainian notation from "НЛО-ТБ" to "НЛО TV" and updated its graphics.

On February 15, 2016, NLO TV began broadcasting the cartoon series "South Park" with Ukrainian and original (English) dubbing. During the showing of the animated series, the TV channel was available simultaneously with Ukrainian and English soundtracks. On November 13 of the same year, the TV channel began broadcasting new seasons with Ukrainian dubbing of the animated series series Family Guy (seasons 11-15) and The Simpsons (seasons 26-28).

Since 2016, NLO TV has started broadcasting football matches of the UEFA Champions League. The first match on the channel was "Wolfsburg - Gent", which took place on March 8, 2016 at 21:30 Kyiv time.

On June 2, 2020, it began broadcasting in high definition (HD).

In connection with the Russian invasion of Ukraine on February 24, 2022, the TV channel broadcast the United News marathon around the clock. From February to April, the TV channel reprogrammed its airwaves for a children's and teenage audience. There was no advertising.

On July 11, 2022, the ultimate owner of the media holding, Rinat Akhmetov, announced the termination of the TV channels and print media of "Media Group Ukraine" and the exit of the parent company "SCM" from the media business, making this conditional on the adoption of the law on deoligarchization. All licenses owned by TV channels will be transferred to the state. Later, the media group clarified that only the licenses issued by the National Council for Television and Radio Broadcasting were transferred to the state, and the assets of the TV channels will be sold off. From the next day, July 12, all TV channels of the media group stopped independent broadcasting and began broadcasting the marathon "Edyny Novyny".

On July 22, 2022, the TV channel stopped broadcasting.

Some of its original productions, as well as foreign series that aired on the channel, were recovered by Starlight Media's Super+ channel whose broadcasts started on December 2, 2024.
