= 2001 Omsk An-70 crash =

Aviation incident in Russia

- UR-NTK at the accident site

Accident
- Date: 27 January 2001
- Summary: Multiple engine failure
- Site: 660 meters from departure runway; 54°58′0″N 73°18′30″E

Aircraft
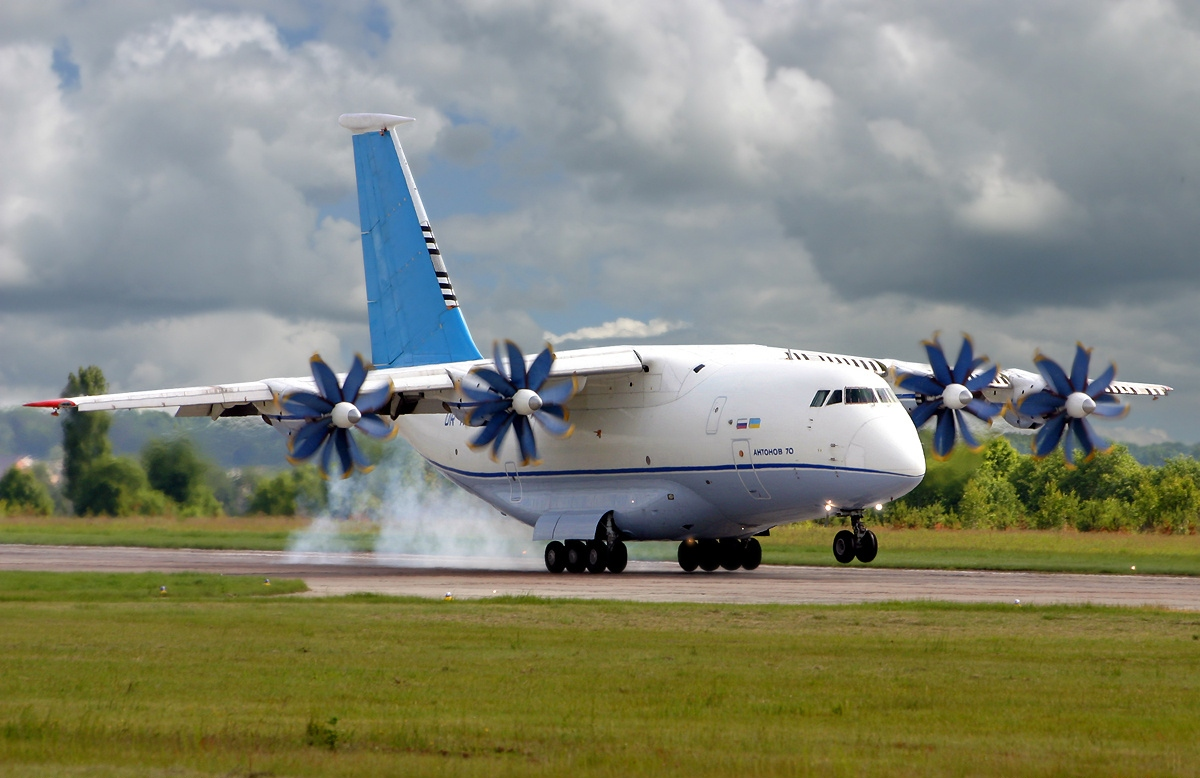
- UR-NTK, the aircraft involved, photographed in 2008 after being repaired
- Aircraft type: Antonov An-70
- Operator: Antonov Design Bureau
- Registration: UR-NTK
- Flight origin: Omsk Airport, Russia
- Destination: Yakutsk Airport, Russia
- Occupants: 33
- Passengers: 22
- Crew: 11
- Fatalities: 0
- Injuries: 4
- Survivors: 33

On 27 January 2001, an Antonov An-70 prototype crashed close to Omsk Tsentralny Airport, Russia during testing of the aircraft. All 33 passengers and crew on board the aircraft survived.

The accident involved the sole surviving An-70 prototype, as the first prototype had been destroyed in a mid-air collision six years previously. This placed the future of the An-70 project in doubt; however, the aircraft was later repaired and returned to flight.

== Accident ==
The aircraft arrived at Omsk at 0:30 and was refueled with 38 tons of jet fuel. 5 hours after landing, the aircraft lifted off the runway on its way to Yakutsk for cold weather testing. Within seconds of becoming airborne one of the Progress D-27 propfans reached an over-speed condition and automatically shut down. The forward propeller stopped rotating but due to the nature of the failure the aft propeller kept turning, producing negative thrust. At this point the flight crew increased power to the remaining three engines but a problem with the RPM sensors on one of them led to automatic engine shut-off. Thus, the An-70 ended up flying at low speed with only two properly functioning engines, with the third engine generating over 11,000 pounds of negative thrust and disrupting airflow across the wing.

The crew successfully made a 180-degree turn to head back towards departure airport but crash landed hard in the snow and ice within several hundred yards of the runway. Of the 33 people aboard (11 crew and 22 specialists from Antonov), 4 were injured, 1 seriously. The accident investigators found that the pilots acted with remarkable skill to turn the aircraft around and crash-land it on the field without lowering the landing gear.

== Aircraft ==
Close up of port side fuselage damage

UR-NTK was one of two An-70 prototype transport planes produced. Prototype 1 was destroyed in a mid-air collision in 1995. The fuselage of Prototype 2 was completely fractured between the midsection and the tail by the heavy landing during this incident. The plane was insured but only for $1 million - a fraction of its actual cost. The aircraft was disassembled on site and relocated to the local "Polyot" aircraft repair factory in Omsk and restored to flying condition. The damaged airframe required months of repair and as of 2012 is the only AN-70 in existence, still performing important flight testing.

== Investigation ==
Three possibilities for the accident were investigated. Engine/Prop malfunction, fuel or oil defects in sub-zero temperatures leading to fuel starvation due to water in the fuel system freezing, or an act of sabotage or terrorism. Sabotage & terrorism were investigated by Russia's FSB which found no corroborating evidence. The fuel crystallization theory was discounted very early by the team of experts investigating the accident, leaving an engine or a propeller malfunction the only remaining possibility.

== Causes ==
The cause of the crash landing of the An-70 near Omsk remained the subject of much debate for a long time and the reason for heated exchange of accusations between the Antonov Design Bureau and the OAO Motor-Sich - the manufacturer of the D-27 engine. The manufacturer of the SV-27 propeller - Aerosila - also received some blame.

A report released by the investigation team in mid-March, by Ukrainian "Aviation and Time" magazine, provided preliminary details into the cause. According to the report, immediately after take-off one of the engines was automatically shut off by its electronic safeguards after it exceeded the safe RPM limit. The front set of blades of the contra rotating propeller assembly stopped but the aft part of the propeller assembly continued turning due to the damaged oil line that powered the blade actuators. This caused the negative air flow estimated at 5,000 kg/11,023 lbs. of thrust.

At the end of March 2001 Antonov's first deputy designer-general Dmitri Kiva provided further details about the cause announcing that the accident was caused by disintegration of the oil line leading to the propeller hub pitch mechanism that attaches to the engine. Kiva said that the pilots attempted to compensate for the loss of power by increasing the settings of the remaining three engines. At some point another D-27 automatically shut off after the safe RPM limit has been exceeded.

== Consequences ==
Port side propfan damage

The aircraft was repaired for approximately $3 million and made its first flight after the catastrophe on 5 June of the same year. On 7 June 2001, the repaired An-70 made a successful appearance at the VVTV-2001 armaments expo in Omsk.

Previously, in early May, An-70 developers announced that the aircraft would be presented at the 2001 Paris Air Show, but after the VVTV-2001 show in Omsk, France excluded the An-70 from the air show citing the aircraft's alleged poor safety record.

The engine/propeller problems were compounded on the pages of Russian newspapers by the existing problems in relations between Russia and Ukraine. Much of this negative publicity was instigated by competitors of Antonov, specifically ZMKB "Progress" and OAO Motor-Sich in Russia and in the West. In reality, however, Ukrainian engine designers and manufacturers had little to do with the cause of the accident. The faulty propeller hub pitch mechanism was manufactured in Russia.

== See also ==
- Aeroflot Flight 3352
- Aviation accidents and incidents
- Aviation safety
- List of accidents and incidents involving military aircraft (2000–09)
- Military transport aircraft
