= Myrotvorets =

Ukrainian website

- Emblem of Myrotvorets (used since 2022)
- Owner: NGO ″Myrotvorets Centre″
- Website: myrotvorets.center
- Commercial: No
- Launched: 15 December 2014; 11 years ago
- Current status: Online

Myrotvorets or Mirotvorets (Ukrainian: Миротво́рець, pronounced [mɪroˈtwɔretsʲ]; lit. 'Peacemaker') is a Ukrainian Kyiv-based website that publishes a running list, and sometimes personal information, of people who are considered by authors of the website to be "enemies of Ukraine", or, as the website itself states, "whose actions have signs of crimes against the national security of Ukraine, peace, human security, and the international law". The website was launched in December 2014 by Ukrainian politician and activist Georgy Tuka. The publishing of personal information on the site has been criticized by human rights organizations.

== Overview ==
The site reflects the work of NGO "Myrotvorets centre", led by a person only known with the alias "Roman Zaitsev", former employee of Luhansk Security Service of Ukraine office. In 2016, the Daily Beast reported that the website was curated by the government law-enforcement and intelligence agency Security Service of Ukraine (SBU). In 2022, its founder, George Tuka, denied that the project is managed by the SBU or that it receives state funding.

It has been promoted by Anton Herashchenko, its co-founder and later advisor to the Ministry of Internal Affairs of Ukraine. The identity of the staff is secret, and a hidden panel sifts through information, often collated from open-source intelligence, as well as information provided by individuals on a confidential basis.

Although it has no official status, the website is regularly consulted at checkpoints to integrate government information systems. According to Tuka, the site has led to the arrest of 1,000 people, since the site's launch, which he claimed included many collaborators and people working for the Federal Security Service that would otherwise not be in any government databases.

The slogan of the centre's website and the centre itself is a Latin saying: Pro bono publico (for the public good).

Myrotvorets Centre began to develop the project in summer 2014, during the war in Donbas after a chance meeting between Tuka and "Roman Zaitsev". The project was launched in December 2014 as part of the work of the volunteer group known as Narodny Tyluk.

On 7 May 2016, the website published the personal data of 4,508 journalists and other media members from all over the world who had worked (or had received accreditation to work) on the war in the uncontrolled government territory of Donbas, and therefore were considered by the site to have cooperated with terrorists. There were phone numbers, email addresses, and some countries and cities of residence of Ukrainian and foreign journalists received from the hacked database of Donetsk People's Republic Ministry of State Security; journalists and support staff provided these data to be accredited by the unrecognized Donetsk People's Republic. In response, the Security Service of Ukraine issued a statement that it found no violations of Ukrainian law by Myrotvorets. According to Yulia Gorbunova, senior researcher for Human Rights Watch, the implications this list has for press freedoms is serious, adding that the existence of the list puts lives in danger. Then-President of Ukraine Petro Poroshenko called the leak a "big mistake".

The website includes text such as "Russians and other enemies should be killed" and "the invaders on Ukrainian soil must be destroyed like rabid cattle!"

== Activity ==
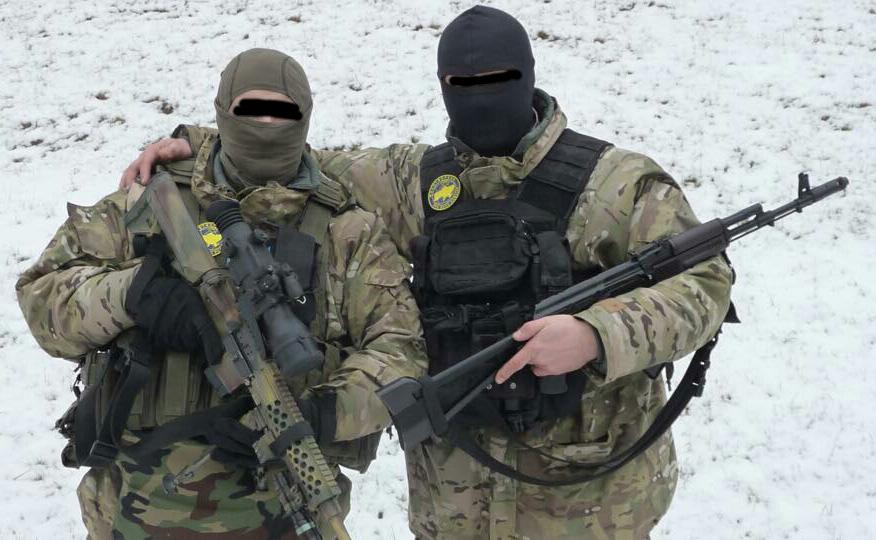
Two Myrotvorets staff members

Emblem of Myrotvorets (used 2014 to 2022)

The "Myrotvorets" leader states that the centre's objective is to provide information and advice to the executive authorities, to finally bring peace and harmony in Ukraine. In its work the centre pays special attention to expressions of "separatist and terrorist activities" on the territory of Ukraine.

In October 2015, Herashchenko said on Facebook that a special section titled "Putin's crimes in Syria and the Middle East" dedicated to providing personal data of Russian military personnel involved in the operation in Syria will be added to Myrotvorets. Myrotvorets' actions caused extremely strong reactions from the Russian presidential administration and among Russian experts in military affairs and special operations. As stated in the website InformNapalm, an important element of the operation was to compare the numbers of Su-24 from the Russian airbase "Shagol" and the same type of aircraft, overturned in Syria. A few days after the operation began, Russian TV started to hide the numbers of military aircraft based in Syria for their video shoots. After the information was published, the Investigative Committee of Russia launched criminal proceedings against Herashchenko for "public calls to terrorism."

In February 2016, members of the centre took part in the operation of mobile groups against illegal transport of cargo through the line of armed conflict in the war in Donbas.

Myrotvorets Centre repeatedly provided information on the participation of foreign nationals in the armed conflict, on the side of pro-Russian separatists. In early March 2016, due to the materials published by the centre, law enforcement authorities in Bulgaria initiated criminal proceedings against George Bliznakov, a Bulgarian citizen. Similar materials are being considered regarding other Bulgarian citizens.

After the site published the data of various journalists, Valeriya Lutkovska, Ukrainian lawyer and Ombudswoman of Ukraine since April 2012, demanded both the website and the Centre be shut down.

On 24 May 2016, Committee to Protect Journalists wrote an open letter to then–Ukrainian President Poroshenko urging him to "condemn the unfounded and damaging allegations published on Myrotvorets, and to clarify publicly that the Ukrainian Interior Ministry is dedicated to protecting journalists and apprehending the people responsible for threatening them, in contrast to Interior Minister Avakov's previous statements".

On 2 June 2016, G7 ambassadors to Kyiv released a joint statement expressing deep concern about disclosures of journalists' personal data on the Myrotvorets website and called on the Myrotvorets team to withdraw personal data from public access. In 2017 Myrotvorets had a criminal case opened against it by the Ukrainian National Police, and the United Nations High Commissioner for Human Rights (OHCHR) urged Ukraine to investigate the website's operations.

Rights group Uspishna Varta wrote in a 2018 report published on the OSCE website that Ukrainian courts had accepted Myrotvorets' data as evidence in judicial decisions, including as material evidence and at all stages of the judicial process, from the pre-trial investigation to conviction. They wrote that the website was used not only in criminal cases, but also in "civil legal relations and fact-finding acts". As of 2019, data from the site had been used in over 100 cases, according to Uspishna Varta.

Al Jazeera wrote in 2019 that Ukrainian border guards used the database for background checks, so blacklisted individuals may not be able to enter Ukraine.

Following the 2022 Russian invasion of Ukraine, the site started the "SeaKrime" initiative to track grain stolen from Ukraine and resold primarily through the port of Sevastopol. This initiative was able to track 200,000 tons of stolen wheat from the Russian-occupied territories over the period of March and April 2022. Based on the SeaKrime data, investigations by France Info and Le Monde were able to track some of the stolen grain to Syria after a ship was turned away from Egypt.

== People included on the list ==
According to the head of the centre, the number of people in the file has grown over time:

- October 2014 — 4,500
- 16 December 2015 – 7,500
- January 2015 – 9,000
- 13 April 2015 – 30,000
- October 2015 – 45,000
- 21 March 2016 – 57,775
- 27 January 2017 — over 102,000
- 23 August 2019 — 187,000

In April 2015, Myrotvorets published the home addresses of Ukrainian writer Oles Buzina and former Verkhovna Rada parliamentarian Oleg Kalashnikov, just days before they were assassinated. The website has been described by some as a hit list.

On 12 September 2017 Myrotvorets added Yulia Tymoshenko (former Prime Minister of Ukraine and leader of the opposition party Batkivshchyna) to its database for "the illegal crossing of Ukraine's state border. An assault within a group of persons on border guards fulfilling their duties to protect the state border of Ukraine. Participation in preparations for the illegal crossing of Ukraine's border by a person without Ukrainian citizenship. Manipulation of socially important information". On 15 April 2018, Syrian President Bashar al-Assad's name was added to the website.

In September 2018, Myrotvorets wrote on Facebook that their database included residents of Zakarpattia Oblast who had illegally taken out Hungarian citizenship. After two weeks of work in Zakarpattia Oblast, the database held more than 300 names of Ukrainian officials and local councillors from the oblast who had Hungarian passports. On 11 October 2018, Hungarian Foreign Minister Péter Szijjártó said: "It is a lie that the Ukrainian state has nothing to do with the website that is listing suspected dual Ukrainian-Hungarian nationals", and claimed that President Petro Poroshenko "gave his consent to the hate campaign in an attempt to increase his popularity".

Myrotvorets has often blacklisted people over Crimea-related issues. In November 2018 Myrotvorets added Gerhard Schröder, the former chancellor of Germany and chairman of the supervisory board of Russian company Rosneft, was added after he called the 2014 Russian annexation of Crimea "a reality we will one day have to come to terms with". Authors of Myrotvorets accused him of "anti-Ukrainian propaganda" and attempting to justify "Russian aggression against Ukraine". A spokeswoman of the German Federal Foreign Office protested against this and asked the Ukrainian government to delete the website.

Roger Waters was added when he said Russia has more rights to Crimea than Ukraine and blamed "extreme nationalists" in Ukraine for the war.

Silvio Berlusconi, Roy Jones Jr, and a number of Russian pop music stars were all added for visiting Crimea, which Ukraine calls an illegal border crossing.

The website published a list of Russian workers involved in the construction of the Kerch bridge.

On 20 April 2019, the day before the second round of the 2019 Ukrainian presidential election, Myrotvorets added soon-to-be-First Lady of Ukraine Olena Zelenska to its database, due to her 2014 repost on Facebook of a Russian propaganda site's call for people to reveal Ukrainian soldiers' movements for pay. Zelenska said that her repost had been meant negatively to show outrage, and Facebook had not shown her commentary along with the post; Ukrainska Pravda said that Zelenska's other posts in 2014 were not pro-Russian, and included other posts that "expose[d] Russian propaganda". Myrotvorets removed Zelenska from its database the next day.

Following the beginning of the 2022 Russian invasion of Ukraine, Myrotvorets added the names of Viktor Orbán (Prime Minister of Hungary) and Zoran Milanović (President of Croatia) in its list of "Enemies of Ukraine". Both had expressed pro-Russian views following the start of the invasion.

On 27 May 2022, Myrotvorets added the former US State Secretary Henry Kissinger after Kissinger, speaking at the World Economic Forum in Davos, suggested that fully antagonizing Russia threatens stability in Europe. The site accused Kissinger of spreading "Russian-fascist propaganda" and acting as an "accomplice to the crimes of Russian authorities against Ukraine and its citizens."

In 2022, the site also added Oleksii Arestovych, an Adviser to the Head of the Office of the President of Ukraine, to its list. In 2023, pornographic actress Eva Elfie was added in the list.

In 2024, Israeli-Russian singer Eden Golan, who auditioned for Russia in the Junior Eurovision Song Contest 2015 and represented Israel in the Eurovision Song Contest 2024, was added to its list after she performed in the children's edition of the New Wave singing competition in 2016, which was held at the Artek camp in Russian-occupied Crimea.

In November 2024, it was determined that Donald Trump's second term political appointee Tulsi Gabbard had a profile on Myrotvorets.

On February 3, 2026, Myrotvorets added FIFA President Gianni Infantino due to his statements about Russia's return to participation in international football tournaments.

== See also ==
- Proscription
- Enemy of the people
- Redwatch
- Doxing
- Canary Mission
