= Super+ =

Ukrainian entertainment television channel

- Country: Ukraine
- Broadcast area: National
- Headquarters: Kyiv, Ukraine

Programming
- Language: Ukrainian
- Picture format: 16:9 (576i, HDTV)

Ownership
- Owner: Starlight Media (TOV Hmarochos-Media)

History
- Launched: December 2, 2024

Super+ is a Ukrainian entertainment channel owned by Starlight Media, aimed at the youth and family demographics.

== History ==
On July 11, 2024, the TV channel became the winner of the competition for a broadcasting license in the MX-1 multiplex of the DVB-T2 digital broadcast network operated by Zeonbud, which broadcasts programs and series of TV channels «Starlight Media» and «Media Group Ukraine».

On October 24 of the same year, the National Council of Ukraine on Television and Radio Broadcasting registered the TV channel for satellite broadcasting.

On December 2 of the same year, the TV channel began broadcasting on satellite and MX-1 of the digital terrestrial network DVB-T2.

== Programming ==
Its programming consists of repeats of Ukrainian productions already broadcast on other Starlight Media channels (such as the reality show Khata na tata (House for Father) from STB, comedy series Varyaty Shou from Novyi Kanal, sitcom Papanki from ICTV etc.) and American series the group has the rights to air, such as Friends, ALF and The Simpsons. At launch time, Super+ has no original content, but its inclusion depends on the channel's profitability, as producing content even for a newly-launched channel is expensive.

== Satellite Television ==
- Satellite: Amos (4.0°W)
- Standard: DVB-S
- Frequency: 12297
- Personal: Horizontal
- Speed: 45000
- FEC: 3/4
- Image: MPEG-4
- Audio: MPEG L-2
- Code: FTA
