= 1995 Borodianka mid-air collision =

Aircraft collision over Ukraine

Accident
- Date: 10 February 1995
- Summary: Mid-air collision caused by pilot error
- Site: Borodianka Raion, Kyiv Oblast, Ukraine; 50°44′38.3″N 29°55′19.1″E
- Total fatalities: 7
- Total survivors: 5

First aircraft
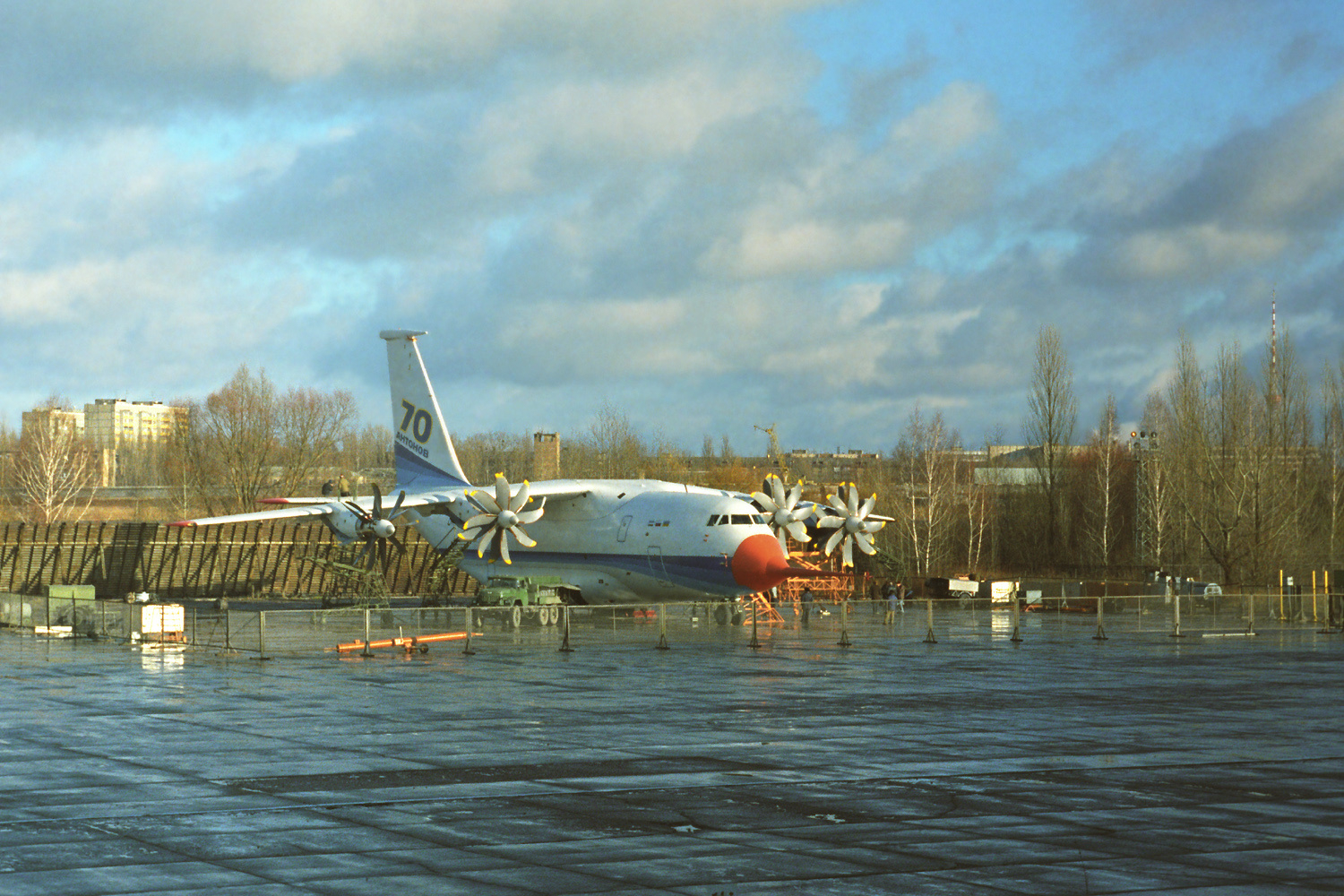
- The aircraft involved in the accident during ground tests, three months before its first flight
- Type: Antonov An-70
- Operator: Antonov Design Bureau
- Registration: Unknown
- Flight origin: Kyiv-Hostomel Airport, Ukraine
- Destination: Kyiv-Hostomel Airport, Ukraine
- Occupants: 7
- Crew: 7
- Fatalities: 7
- Survivors: 0

Second aircraft
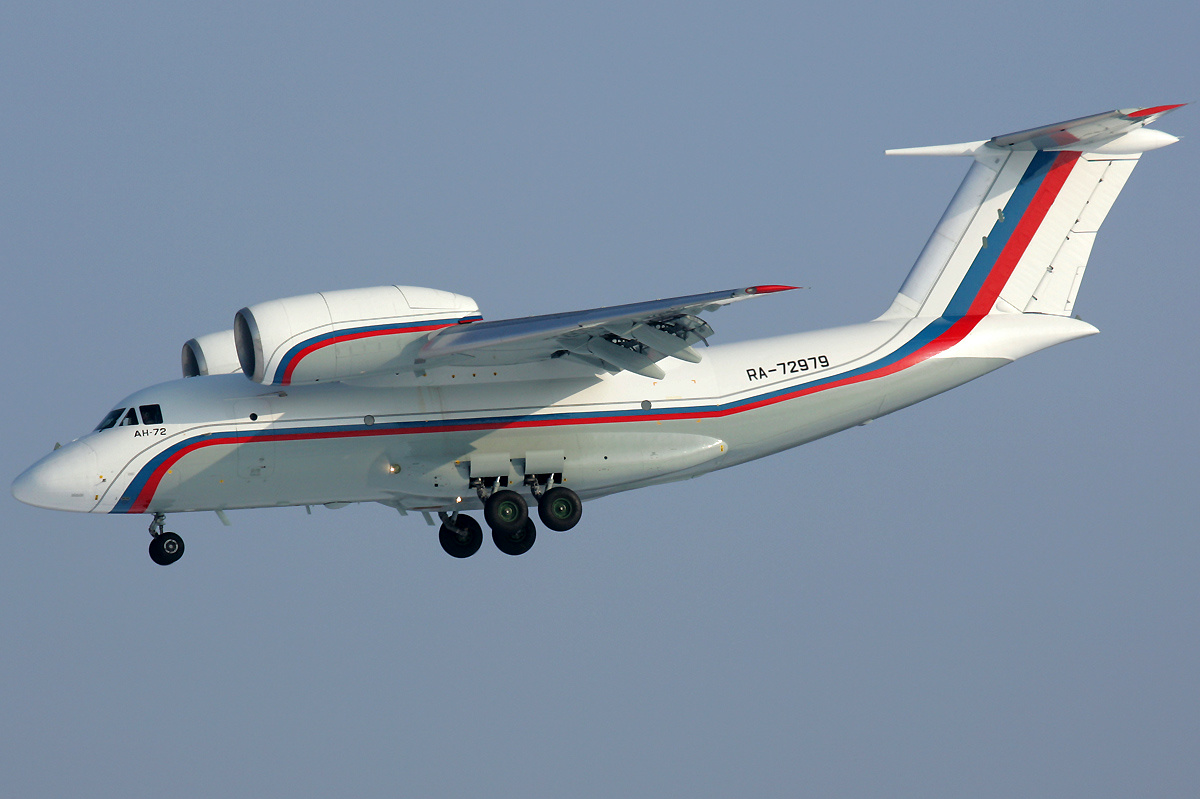
- An Antonov An-72 similar to the one involved
- Type: Antonov An-72
- Operator: Antonov Design Bureau
- Registration: UR-72966
- Flight origin: Kyiv-Hostomel Airport, Ukraine
- Destination: Kyiv-Hostomel Airport, Ukraine
- Occupants: 5
- Crew: 5
- Fatalities: 0
- Survivors: 5

On 10 February 1995, at 16:09 CET, the first Antonov An-70 prototype aircraft collided with an Antonov An-72 that was assisting with the An-70 test program over Borodianka Raion in Ukraine. All seven crew members on board the An-70 were killed; the An-72 was able to make a safe emergency landing at Hostomel Airport in Kyiv with no fatalities.

== Causes ==
A Ukrainian-led commission reported that the cause was human error and blamed the flight maneuvers by the crew as the major contributing factor to the crash. Leonid Berestov is quoted as saying "The careless actions of both crews in their formation flying led to a collision and crash".

Several faults were observed in the three test flights that took place before the accident flight, including flight control problems during the second flight and again during the third flight, on the day preceding the collision.

== Bibliography ==
- (in Russian) Светлая память погибшим // Авиация и Время. — К. : 1995. — No. 1. — С. 25. (Obituary in Aviatsiya i Vremia journal, including photogallery of the crew).
- Polyakov, Anatoliy (March 11, 1995). "Prospects for trouble-plagued An-70 aircraft". Russia National Affairs: Political Issues. Central Eurasia. Daily Report: Supplement. Translated by Foreign Broadcast Information Service (FBIS). Kyiv, Ukraine. Krasnaya Zvezda. pp. 33–34. hdl:2027/inu.30000046091546.
- Sergeyev, Vladimir (March 2, 1995). "Reasons for An-70 February crash, future of project considered". Ukraine: Economic Issues. Central Eurasia. Daily Report: Supplement. Translated by Foreign Broadcast Information Service (FBIS). Segodnya. pp. 42–43. hdl:2027/nnc1.cu00733830.
- Leskov, Sergey (February 23, 1995). "Development of experimental An-70 plane detailed". Russia National Affairs: Economic Issues. Central Eurasia. Daily Report: Supplement. Translated by Foreign Broadcast Information Service (FBIS). Kyiv, Ukraine. Izvestiya. pp. 28–29. hdl:2027/nnc1.cu00733822.
- "Defense minister on preliminary findings of An-70 crash". Ukraine: National Affairs. Central Eurasia. Daily Report. Translated by Foreign Broadcast Information Service (FBIS). Ukrayinske Radio First Program Network. February 18, 1995. pp. 52–53. hdl:2027/nnc1.cu00733806.
