= Oleksandr Halunenko =

Soviet test pilot and Ukrainian politician (born 1946)

Hero of Ukraine Oleksandr Halunenko
- Олександр Галуненко
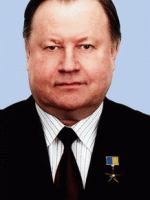
- Official Verkhovna Rada portrait, 2006
- Born: 1 March 1946 (age 80); Troyitske, Ukrainian SSR, Soviet Union
- Citizenship: Ukraine
- Education: Chernihiv Military Aviation Higher School of Pilots; Leningrad Institute of Aviation Instrumentation
- Occupations: Soviet Air Force pilot; test pilot; engineer; politician
- Years active: 1968–present
- Employer: Antonov
- Known for: Testing Antonov An-124 Ruslan and Antonov An-225 Mriya aircraft and aviation records of FAI
- Spouse: Olga Halunenko
- Children: 2
- Awards: Hero of Ukraine (1999)
- Education: Military aviation – Chernihiv Military Aviation Higher School of Pilots (1968); Test pilot – Fedotov Test Pilot School (1975)
- Aviation career
- First flight: 1965
- Flight license: 1968; USSR
- Air force: Soviet Air Forces

Oleksandr Vasylyovych Halunenko (Ukrainian: Олександр Васильович Галуненко; born 1 March 1946) is a Ukrainian test pilot, Honoured Test Pilot of the USSR, the president of the Ukrainian Federation of Aeronautical Sports (member of the Fédération Aéronautique Internationale), Hero of Ukraine.

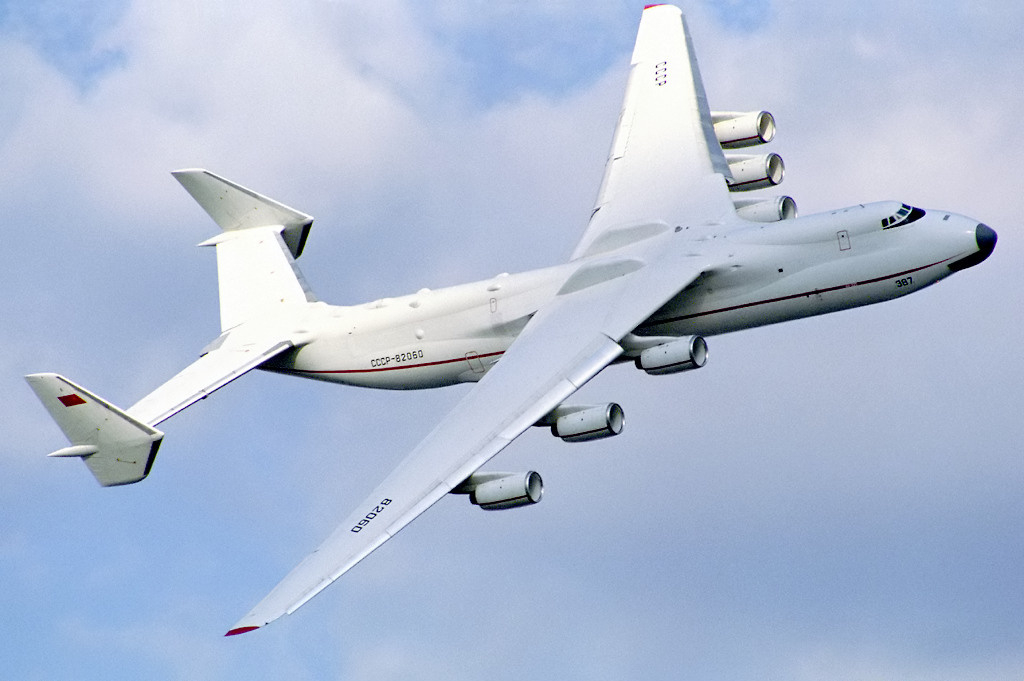
Antonov An-225 in 1990. On 11 September 2001, the crew of Oleksandr Halunenko set 214 national and 124 world records in one flight on this aeroplane

He is known for testing such airplanes as the Antonov An-124 Ruslan and the super giant Antonov An-225 Mriya.

Halunenko received the Hero of Ukraine award for manually landing the second prototype of the Antonov An-70 successfully, after malfunctions of the electronic control system occurred during its April 1997 initial flight. After retiring from flying in 2004, he served a single term in the Ukrainian parliament beginning in 2006. A resident of Bucha, Ukraine, Halunenko survived the battle of Bucha during the 2022 Russian invasion of Ukraine.

== Awards ==
- Hero of Ukraine with the Order of the Gold Star (August 21, 1999)
- Order of Merit (Ukraine) (September 20, 1997)
