= Oles Buzina =

Ukrainian journalist and writer (1969–2015)

- Олесь Бузина
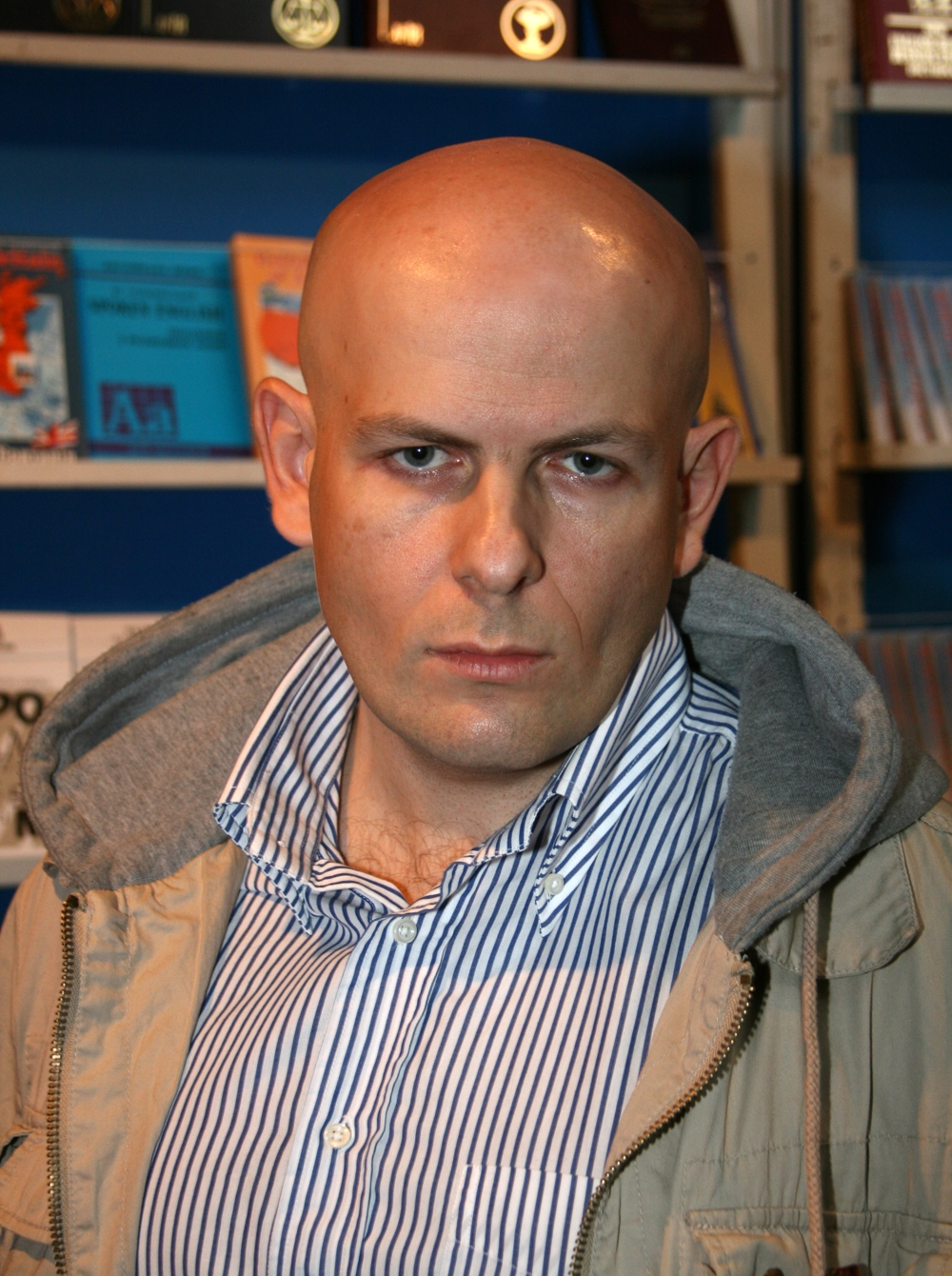
- Buzina in 2008
- Born: 13 July 1969; Kiev, Ukrainian SSR, Soviet Union
- Died: 16 April 2015 (aged 45); Kyiv, Ukraine
- Occupations: Journalist, writer, politician
- Website: www.buzina.org

Oles Oleksiiovych Buzina (Ukrainian: Оле́сь Олексі́йович Бузина́; 13 July 1969 – 16 April 2015) was a Ukrainian journalist and writer known for his criticism of Ukrainian politics, corruption and for supporting closer ties between Ukraine, Belarus, and Russia.

He was found killed by a gunshot on 16 April 2015, near his residence in Kyiv. The murder case remains unsolved.

== Biography ==
Oles Buzina was born on 13 July 1969 in Kiev and attended local schools. In 1992 he graduated from the Faculty of Philology Taras Shevchenko National University of Kyiv specialising as a teacher of Russian language and literature. He began a career in journalism working for a number of Ukrainian media outlets:

- Newspaper Kievskiye Vedomosti (1993–2005)
- Newspaper 2000 (2005–2006)
- Various magazines, such as Natali, EGO Ukraine, XXL Ukraine
- From October 2006 Buzina was an anchorman of Teen-liga program on TV channel Inter
- Newspaper Segodnya, where he had his own column and blog since 2007
- As an expert, he participated in the reality-show Bachelor on TV channel STB from 2011
- From 2012 he was host of Po sledam prashurov (In the Footsteps of Ancestors) show on K-1 TV channel.
- In January 2015 he became editor-in-chief of Segodnya newspaper, where he had worked for many years. He resigned in March, protesting the censorship of the newspaper's owners, having limited control over newspaper's policy, his absence of control over newspaper's website, and an imposed ban on his appearance on TV and interviews with the press.
- Buzina founded his own website, featuring blogs and sale of some of his books online.

He was invited as a guest to numerous talk shows in Russia. Some of his articles were published in the Russian media.

As a writer he published eight books, mainly about prominent figures and the history of Ukraine and Russia.

== Politics ==
In addition to his reporting, Buzina tried to enter politics. In May 2009 he campaigned for adoption of a series of laws prohibiting neo-Nazi organizations, propaganda of Nazism, and ideological legacy of Organization of Ukrainian Nationalists as a totalitarian fascist party. This initiative was supported by Borys Kolesnikov, one of the leaders of Party of Regions.

In May 2009 National Expert Commission of Ukraine on the Protection of Public Morality launched an investigation against Oles Buzina as a result of a complaint filed by Petro Kononenko, director of Institute of Ukrainology. Kononenko stated that Oles Buzina "discredited most outstanding Ukrainian public figures and picks everything that's shameful in our history".

As of April 2009 Buzina was sued 11 times and every single time judges ruled out in his favour. In 2000 he was physically assaulted right after winning in court one of these cases. Some of these legal actions saw Ukrainian politicians as plaintiffs: Pavlo Movchan, Volodymyr Yavorivsky.

Buzina ran in the 2012 Ukrainian parliamentary election for a constituency seat in Kyiv for Russian Bloc but failed to win parliamentary representation. In Constituency No. 223, his 8.22% of votes was insufficient.

== Political and public views ==
Buzina held anti-Orange Revolution and anti-Euromaidan views.

On 20 January 2006, he claimed that as a writer he was aware of political censorship in post-Orange Revolution Ukraine, as some publishers were afraid to release his books.

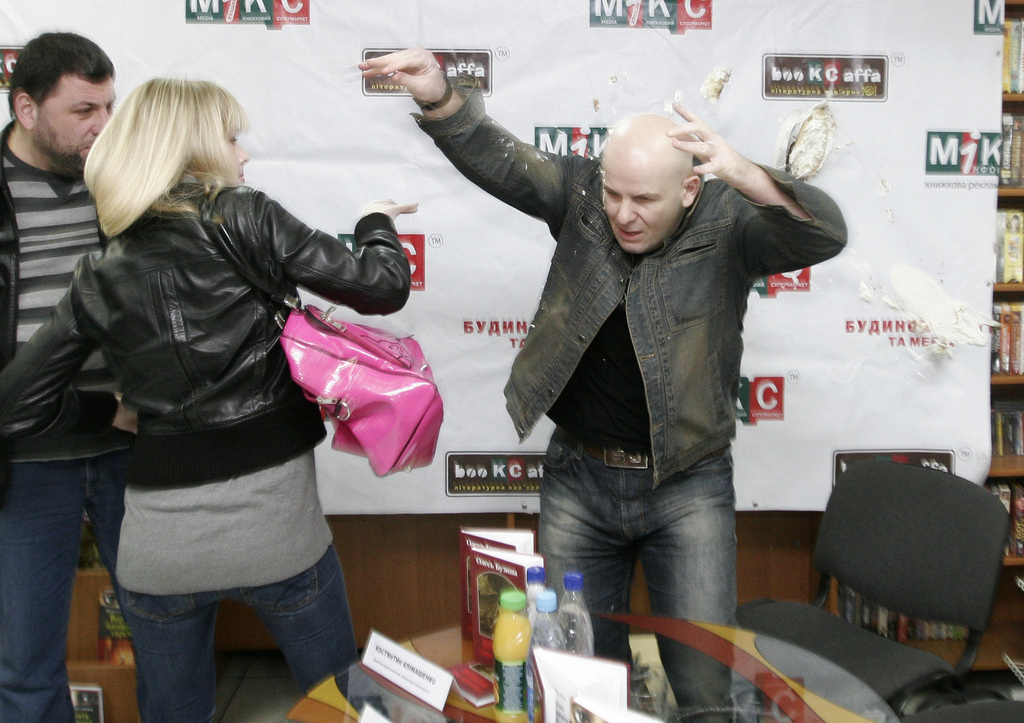
On 22 March 2009, a Femen activist threw a cake at Oles Buzina, protesting his book in which he defended men's rights.

Oles Buzina was rated 4th in the "Homophobe of the Year - 2011" list by the Ukrainian gay forum.

He identified himself as both Ukrainian and Russian, though having ethnic Ukrainian parents.

His views on Ukraine expressed on multiple occasions during years of journalism and political commentary included statements that Ukraine should be part of Russia, that it should be a bilingual federal state of Russia and that it should favor an alliance with Belarus and Kazakhstan rather than joining the European Union.

He was criticized for openly supporting reconstruction of the Russian Empire.

== Assassination ==
In January 2014, Buzina said on a Russian state-owned TV channel Russia-1 that he was receiving constant death threats. In April 2015, the Myrotvorets website published his home addresses.

On 16 April, Buzina was found dead near his home.

His killing was one of a few targeting pro-Russian activists or people linked to former president Victor Yanukovych during that time period. Former MP Oleg Kalashnikov was shot and killed in his apartment block the same week.

A previously unknown Ukrainian nationalist group calling itself the "Ukrainian Insurgent Army" - named after a group of partisans who fought against the Soviet army in World War II, claimed responsibility for the murders of Buzina and Kalashnikov, in emails to the parliamentary opposition and to political scientist Volodymyr Fesenko. Markian Lubkivskyi, an advisor at the Security Service of Ukraine, said that linguistic analysis of the telephone call of the "Ukrainian Insurgent Army" indicated they were not native Ukrainian speakers, and Vasyl Vovk, the head of the Main Investigations Directorate of the Security Service of Ukraine, said the organization was fake. Analyst Anton Shekhovtsov stated that the "Ukrainian Insurgent Army" is frequently demonised in Russian propaganda. He also speculated that corruption related to Yanukovych's presidency or action by far-right Ukrainian activists were both plausible theories explaining the murder, as was the view of Poroshenko and others that the murders could be provocations by Russian intelligence.

== Investigation ==
On 18 June 2015, Minister of the Interior Arsen Avakov announced the arrest of two alleged killers, Andrey Medvedko and Denis Polischuk. One of the suspects served in the Kyiv-2 Battalion of the Interior Ministry of Ukraine and was a member of the neo-Nazi group "S14", while the other was a member of the nationalist party Ukrainian National Assembly – Ukrainian People's Self-Defence (UNA-UNSO); both deny responsibility for the murder.

On 23 June 2015, Polischuk was released on bail after businessman Oleksiy Tamrazov posted his ₴5 million bail. However, on 2 July, the decision was overturned by the Shevchenkovsky District Court of Kyiv, and Polischuk was re-arrested. On 9 December 2015, the Pechersky District Court of Kyiv moved Polishuk to house arrest, ordering him to wear an electronic tagging bracelet. On 31 December 2015, Medvenko was also moved to house arrest under similar conditions.

On 25 March 2016, the Pechersky District Court of Kyiv released Polischuk from house arrest and released Medvenko on personal obligation. On 23 May, the Court revoked all restrictive measures on Medvenko.

In July 2016, it was reported that a lot of major evidence, including photo robots of the suspects who looked differently from the official suspects, CCTV footage and cell phone monitoring, had been lost from case materials.

On 28 November 2017, the indictment against Polischuk and Medvenko was sent to the Shevchenkovsky District Court of Kyiv for consideration.

== Reactions ==
Ukrainian President Petro Poroshenko said that the Buzina and Kalashnikov's murders were "a deliberate provocation" aimed at "destabilising the internal political situation in Ukraine and discrediting the political choice of the Ukrainian people", and that he would personally oversee the investigations into the two murders. Prime Minister Arseniy Yatsenyuk said that the best specialists of the General Procurator’s Office and police would be dealing with the crimes. Ukrainian MP and adviser to the Minister of Internal Affairs Anton Gerashchenko speculated that Buzina’s murder "had been organised by the Russian security services in order to create the atmosphere of terror in Kiev, to carry on the hysteria in the Russian media".

Russian President Vladimir Putin said on live Russian TV that this murder was a political one and offered his condolences to the family of the victim. Radio Free Europe reported that "At 2:05, Ukrainian presidential adviser Anton Gerashchenko confirmed the slaying on Facebook. And by 2:17, Russian President Vladimir Putin was already using Buzina's killing to attack Ukraine's "democratic" values during his annual call-in show with the Russian public."

Ukrainian officials blamed "Russian special forces assassins" for the murder.

The United Nations High Commissioner for Human Rights Zeid Raad Al Hussein described this murder and others as disturbing and demanded quick and decisive investigation. The European Union, Germany, the United States, UNESCO, OSCE, Amnesty International demanded an independent investigation of Buzina's murder as well as that of Ukrainian journalist Serhiy Sukhobok and politician Oleg Kalashnikov.

== Publications ==
- Вурдалак Тарас Шевченко (2000), (Taras Shevchenko, the Vourdalak)
- Тайная история Украины-Руси (2005), (The secret story of Ukraine-Rus')
- Верните женщинам гаремы (2008), (Return harems to women)
- Революция на болоте (2010), (Revolution in a swamp)
- Воскрешение Малороссии (2012) (The resurrection of Little Russia)
- Союз плуга и трезуба. Как придумали Украину (2013) (The Union of Plough and Trident. How Ukraine was invented)
- Докиевская Русь (2014) (Rus' before Kievan Rus')
