= Antonov An-70 =

Ukrainian/Russian military transport aircraft prototype by Antonov

An-70
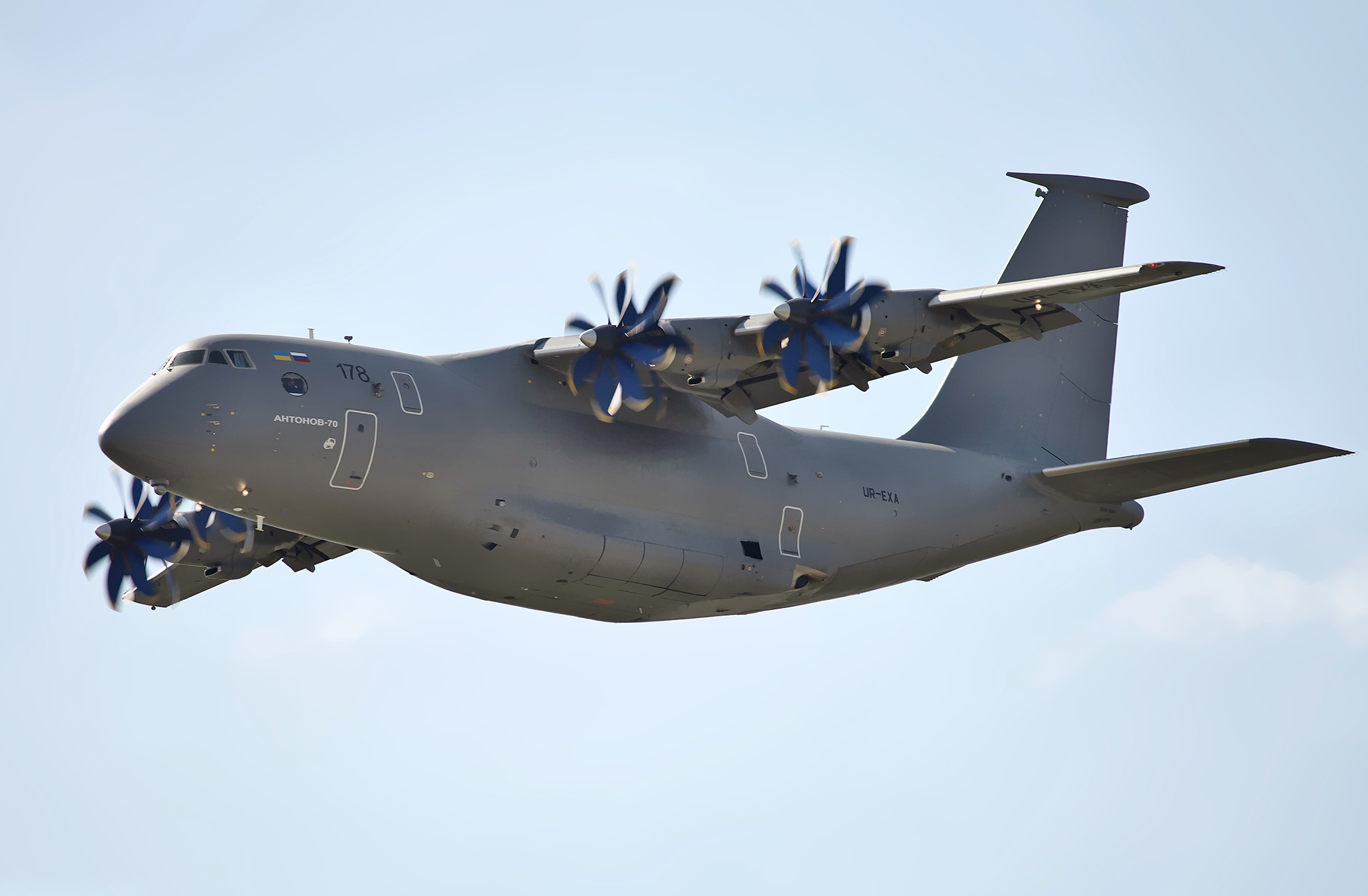
- The An-70 in flight

General information
- Type: Military transport aircraft
- National origin: Soviet Union; Ukraine
- Designer: Antonov Design Bureau
- Built by: Antonov Serial Production Plant
- Status: Completed state tests, open for production
- Primary user: Ukrainian Air Force
- Number built: 2 prototypes

History
- Manufactured: 1991–1996; 2012–2015
- First flight: 16 December 1994

The Antonov An-70 (Ukrainian: Антонов Ан-70) is a four-engine medium-range transport aircraft, and the first aircraft to take flight powered only by propfan engines. It was developed in the late 1980s by the Antonov Design Bureau to replace the obsolete An-12 military transport aircraft. The maiden flight of the first prototype took place in December 1994 in Kyiv, now independent Ukraine. Within months the prototype had suffered a mid-air collision. A second airframe was produced to allow the flight-test programme to proceed. Both prototypes were produced by the Kyiv Aircraft Production Plant.

Following the dissolution of the Soviet Union in the early 1990s, the programme became a joint development between Russia and Ukraine. The former compounded the issue of a reduced market with its intermittent commitment to the project. Repeated attempts to start production have had limited success. Western European countries, including Germany, at one stage assessed the aircraft for procurement, but many later decided against it.

== Development ==
=== Origins and early testing history ===
The origins of the An-70 can be traced back to the mid-1970s, when the Antonov Design Bureau began preliminary design work on a successor for the An-12 four-engine turboprop aircraft. The Soviet Armed Forces, by the 1980s, were looking for a replacement for the An-12 and a complement to the Ilyushin Il-76 four-engine jet transporter; in 1987, the Ministry of Defence, with a new emphasis on air mobility, specified an aircraft with a quick loading time, the ability to operate from short unprepared airfields, could carry up to 300 troops, and have good operating economy. The initial contract for work on the An-70 was concluded in May 1989; Antonov began advanced design work on the new aircraft during the same year. After the collapse of the Soviet Union, in June 1993, the Russian and Ukrainian governments agreed to jointly develop the An-70, with 80 percent of the funding expected to come from Russia. The following year, twenty companies and organisations from the former Soviet Union agreed to jointly develop, market and support the aircraft.

There were plans to establish mass ("serial") production of the model at the Kyiv Aircraft Production Plant (later renamed as the Antonov Serial Production Plant), which was associated with but separate from the Antonov Design Bureau, and at the Samara Aircraft Production Plant (later reorganised as Aviakor) in Samara, Russia. At one stage during early development, Russia was showing reluctance at supporting the development of the An-70, and so Uzbekistan sought, unsuccessfully, to establish a final assembly plant in the capital at the Tashkent Aircraft Production Plant, where the production of the An-70's wings and the Il-76 were taking place. Construction of the first prototype had started in Kyiv in 1991. The maiden flight of the aircraft had originally been scheduled for late 1992. However, due to financing and design issues, this was pushed back until 1994. In particular, the weakened national currency diminished the firm's ability to pay for the aircraft's components, especially those sourced from Russia, and workers' salaries. In addition, engineers discovered numerous design and manufacturing deficiencies during the final ground checks, the majority of which were non-critical yet necessitated lengthy corrections. In the end, the aircraft made its maiden flight on 16 December 1994.

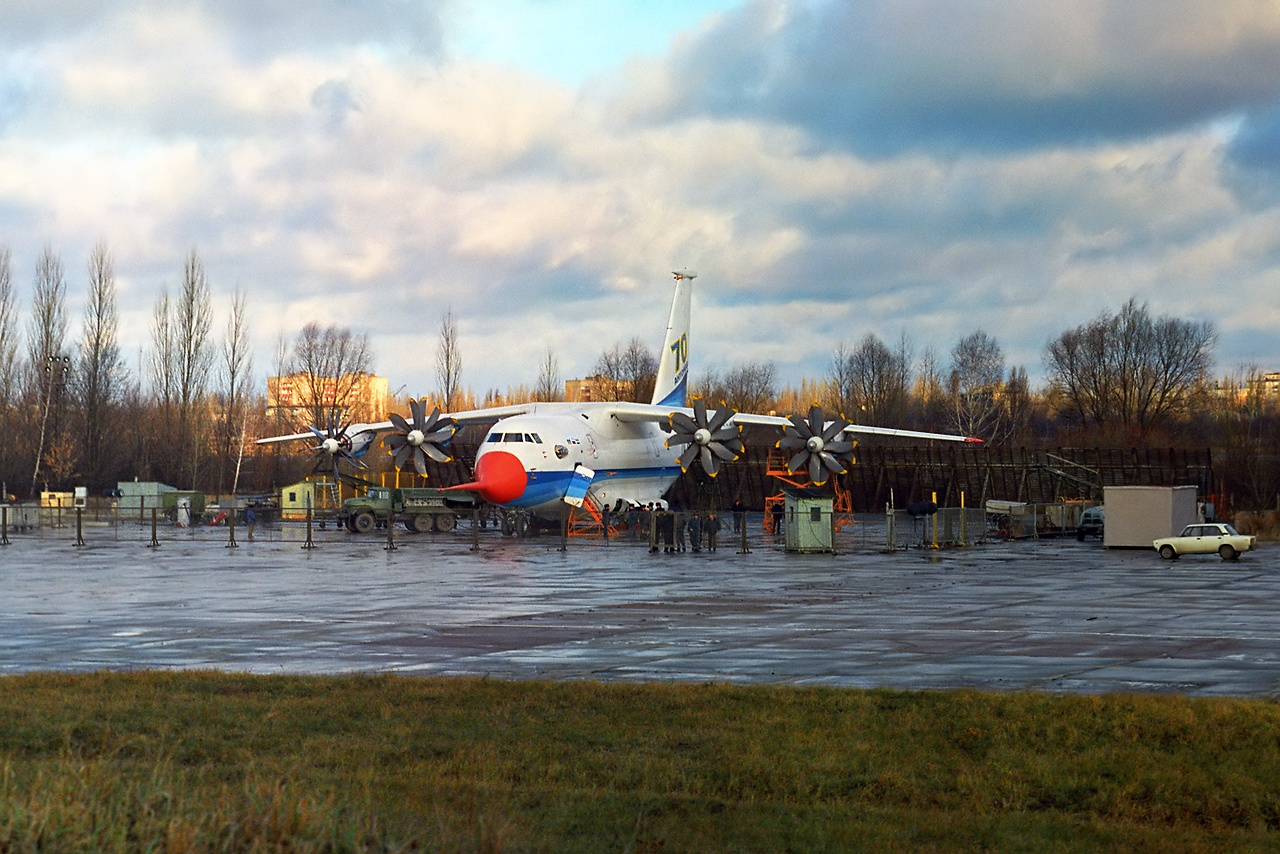
The first An-70 prototype in November 1994

Crewed by a seven-man team, the first aircraft performed a short take off from Svyatoshino Airfield, Kyiv. This was the first flight of an aircraft that was powered only by propfans. Due to worsening weather conditions over Antonov's headquarters and the flight test area in Kyiv, the flight was cut short, and the flight ceiling was capped at 2,000 m (6,600 ft). The crew took the aircraft to a height of 450 m (1,480 ft), while performing basic checkouts of the prototype's systems. After having been airborne for less than half an hour, the aircraft landed at Antonov's flight test facility at Hostomel. During the flight, engineers identified problems with the engine gearboxes, and so the aircraft was grounded for eight weeks while the issues were fixed.

Originally, the aircraft was to conduct flight tests at Hostomel for three months before transferring to the Gromov Flight Research Institute in Zhukovsky, near Moscow. However, the first prototype was lost when it was making its fourth flight on 10 February 1995. During the flight, the aircraft suffered a sudden deviation from its intended flightpath and collided with the An-72 chase plane before spiralling into the ground, erupting into flames; the test crew of seven were killed. Although there were initial allegations of technical issues with the aircraft, it was later determined that the crash had been caused by human error.

Antonov subsequently converted the static-test prototype into a flying prototype equipped with a modified flight-control system. The second airframe was rolled out in December 1996 in Kyiv, before making its first flight on 24 April 1997 from Svyatoshino Airfield, during which the aircraft was airborne for 31 minutes; according to Jane's, however, the aircraft had taken off from Hostomel for a 26-minute flight. The second prototype's initial flight nearly ended in disaster, as the flight-control system repeatedly malfunctioned. Test pilot Oleksandr Halunenko was forced to manually land the prototype, for which he was honored with the Hero of Ukraine title. By this time, more than US$2.5 billion had been spent on the programme, with a further $200 million to be spent to prepare the aircraft for production, which was expected to have started in 1999 with 20–25 aircraft produced annually. The Russian and Ukrainian Air Forces reportedly had long-term plans to procure 500 and 100 aircraft, respectively. The second airframe was severely damaged during cold weather testing on 27 January 2001 in a crash landing after take-off.

=== Western evaluation ===
In the early 1990s, the An-70 was unsuccessfully considered as a platform to meet the European Staff Requirement (ESR) for the Future Large Aircraft (FLA) programme; the programme envisaged the development of a transport aircraft that is midway in size and capability between the Lockheed Martin C-130J and the McDonnell Douglas C-17 to replace the C-130 Hercules. In October 1997, however, the German Defence Minister Volker Rühe announced his intention to study whether the An-70 could be the basis for the FLA. The decision arose out of the German government's objective of providing industrial aid to and thus enhancing political ties with Eastern Europe. In December 1997, France, Germany, Russia and Ukraine agreed to evaluate the An-70 as a candidate for the FLA programme.

Antonov proposed a "westernised" version of the An-70, the An-7X. The German government tasked DaimlerChrysler Aerospace (DASA) with the responsibility of evaluating the An-70 and assessing whether it would fulfill the ESR for a common tactical airlifter. Airbus provided data of the aircraft to DASA, who confirmed the data with its own wind-tunnel tests. According to the DASA study from 1999, the An-70 fulfilled the ESR, and that westernisation is possible, but work in key areas would have been necessary and risks existed. Areas identified include the introduction of full authority digital engine control, a completely new cockpit, a new flight-control system computer, the addition of in-flight refuelling capability, as well as modifications to allow paratroopers to be dropped from the rear cargo door. DASA recommended a change in the manufacturing method of the carbon-fiber-reinforced polymer components. Also the fuselage manufacturing-method was considered uneconomical. German, Ukrainian and Russian companies had formed the joint-venture "AirTruck" to plan and manage the modifications needed to westernise the An-70.

The German government, for political reasons, preferred the An-70. During a separate German Ministry of Defence evaluation of the An-7X, the aircraft was apparently considered to be superior to the A400M designed by the military branch of Airbus. According to AirTruck, the Defence Ministry estimated the An-7X to be 30 percent cheaper than its rival, would provide industrial benefits as Germany would receive substantial workshare, and was deemed to be technically superior, due mainly to its new propfan technology; however, a Defence Ministry spokesperson denied that a conclusion had been reached. On the other hand, DASA preferred the A400M, and refused to be the prime contractor for the An-70 if it was to be chosen. In the meantime, Belgium, France, Italy, Portugal, Spain, Turkey and the UK, were tentative members of the FLA programme and were estimated to have a requirement for up to 288 aircraft; Russia and Ukraine themselves were looking to acquire 210 An-70s. Other contenders for the FLA were the C-17 and C-130J. In April 2000, the German government, the strongest supporter of the An-70, stated that it was committed to buying the same aircraft as the other countries. In the end, the A400M was chosen for the FLA project; had the An-70 been chosen, fifty percent of the aircraft would have been manufactured by Airbus.

=== 2001 incident and later disputes ===
In December 1999, the Russian government outlined that it planned to purchase 164 aircraft by 2018. The Ukrainian government in October 2000 estimated that the country had a requirement for 65 aircraft. By then, the Russian government had awarded the Polyot plant, which was based in Omsk, the right to produce the aircraft, ahead of Aviakor and Aviastar of Samara and Ulyanovsk, respectively. The Kyiv Aircraft Production Plant was expected to produce the first aircraft in 2003, and Polyot, in 2004. As the An-70 flight test programme had reached its final stages by the end of 2000, it was expected that the Russian and Ukraine Defence Ministries would approve of mass production at the start of 2001. On 27 January 2001, however, the second An-70 prototype made a crash landing on its belly after losing power in two engines on take-off during cold weather testing in Omsk, and was severely damaged. Four of the 33 people on board were injured. Antonov recovered the crashed aircraft and repaired it, but the project still lacked funding.

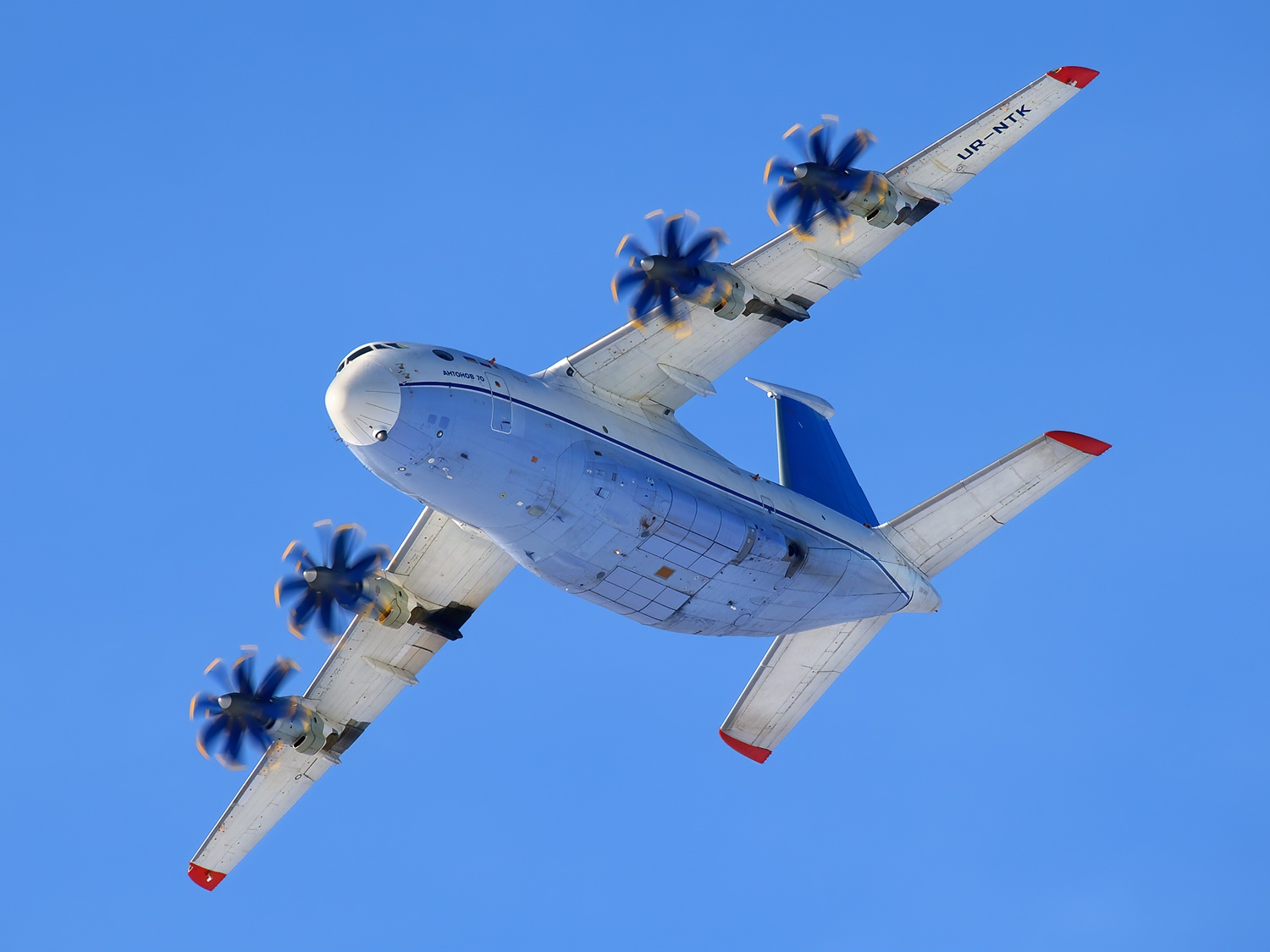
An-70 in-flight

In January 2002, preparations started on mass production as the Russian government affirmed that the aircraft was in the country's nine-year military budget; by now, Ukraine had already placed an order for five aircraft. Despite the affirmation that the country was committed to the project, there were other indications that Russia had lost considerable interest in the An-70. In February 2002, for example, the Defence Ministry did not contribute towards the An-70's development costs for the period, and at the same time military experts were withdrawn from the test programme. The following year, senior Russian Air Force officials publicly discredited the project; Commander-in-chief of the Russian Air Force, General Vladimir Mikhaylov, labelled it as undeveloped, and the aircraft as "dangerous," too heavy and too expensive. Indeed, there were rumours that Russia would soon abandon the project; however, in May 2003, Russian President Vladimir Putin reassured his Ukrainian counterpart that Russia was committed to the project.

Nevertheless, Antonov looked elsewhere for an industrial partner. In September that year, the company signed a memorandum of understanding (MoU) with China Aviation Industry Corporation II that covered the possible joint development of transport aircraft. Russian ambivalence towards the An-70 was made evident when the Russian Defence Ministry did not allocate any funds in the near future towards the procurement of the aircraft for its air force. Instead, resources were dedicated towards the upgraded Il-76MF. After the Orange Revolution in late 2004, and with Ukraine openly aiming for NATO membership, political will for the project evaporated. In April 2006, General Mikhaylov announced that Russia was withdrawing from the project, although at the time there was no official confirmation from the Russian government itself. Mikhaylov had reportedly been a staunch opponent of the An-70, claiming that the D-27 engine was "unreliable", and had advocated for the adoption of the Il-76MF, which was estimated to cost half that of the An-70. Up until then, Russia had provided around 60 percent of the estimated $5 billion invested in the project.

=== Subsequent development ===
Intermittent commitment from the Russian side plagued the project, as Russia owed the programme an outstanding debt for the three years through 2009. According to various reports, Russia's conflict with Georgia in August 2008 highlighted the need for an airlifter in the class of the An-70, one that had a spacious cargo bay and the ability to operate from unpaved airstrips. Consequently, in August 2009, both countries agreed to resume development of the An-70. Ukraine continued to pursue flight testing of the sole prototype while making upgrades to the aircraft's avionics, sensors and propulsion system. It was reported that the Ukrainian Air Force would take delivery of its first two An-70s in 2011 and 2012; Volga-Dnepr Airlines had also signed an MoU with Antonov for five commercial-standard An-70Ts. A requirement for 60 An-70s was included in Russia's 2011–2020 national armament programme when it was issued in December 2010.

In late July 2010, Antonov suspended the flight test programme to update the aircraft. After an extensive series of modifications, including revised avionics (which reduced the flight crew from five to four) and changes to the aircraft's propellers to improve reliability and decrease noise, the second prototype An-70 flew again on 27 September 2012 and took part in the Aviasvit XXI airshow in Kyiv. During the same year, Russian and Ukrainian authorities agreed on the basic workshare of the production programme. Antonov in Kyiv would now produce the wings, tail surfaces and engine nacelles. The KAPO factory in Kazan, Russia, would be responsible for the manufacture of the fuselage, the final assembly of the aircraft, and flight testing. Other major components would come from Novosibirsk, Ulyanovsk and Voronezh; construction of the fuselage of the first production aircraft was reportedly complete in December 2012.

The test programme would last from September 2012 until April 2014, when the aircraft passed state acceptance trials. During that time, the An-70 conducted approximately 120 flights totalling 220 hours, with much of the certification effort carried out by Ukrainian specialists and officials. This is because, despite the aircraft's inclusion in Russia's state rearmament programme, Russia had withdrawn from the project in November 2012 reportedly due to slow progress, a fact that was disclosed only in April 2013. According to a report, the withdrawal of Russia from the project was—apart from a response to the Ukrainian government's EU choices—the result of political manoeuvring by Russian government officials with links to Ilyushin to pressure the government to purchase the Il-476, a re-winged variant of the Il-76. In total, the An-70 had conducted some 735 flights and had accumulated 930 hours during state tests.

As a result of the Russian invasion of Crimea, the Ukrainian government, in April 2014, announced that it would halt all military-technical cooperation with Russia. In August 2014, a Ukrainian court ordered the Russian Defence Ministry to make outstanding payments to Antonov. In March 2015, Russia Defence Ministry declared that it is ruling out the An-70 for state procurement. It also declared that, as in their opinion, Ukraine has withdrawn from the military and defence agreements signed before the crisis between them by completing the aircraft without Russian involvement, it would request return of 2.95 billion rubles that Russian government had spent on An-70 project.

== Design ==
The An-70 is a monoplane with a high-mounted wing design that features four distinctive propfan engines. Designed by the Progress Design Bureau, each of the D-27 engines is rated at 13,800 shp (which can be uprated to 16,000 shp), which is used to drive the SV-27 contra-rotating scimitar propellers designed by Aerosila; eight on the front propeller and six on the aft propeller. The propfan engines deliver slipstream to the supercritical wings that feature double-slotted flaps on its trailing edges to provide high lift coefficients at low speeds. The modernisation of the aircraft during 2010–12 saw upgrades to the engines, including the incorporation of FADEC, and the further separation of the two propellers. The aircraft's cruise speed is 750 km/h (400 kn) at an operational altitude of 8,600 to 9,600 m (28,200 to 31,500 ft); Antonov claimed in 1997 that the aircraft had a design maximum speed of 850 km/h (460 kt, or Mach 0.8), which would have compared favourably with Mach 0.77 of the larger turbofan-powered C-17. According to DASA's evaluation, the propfan engines were 10 percent more efficient than conventional turboprops.

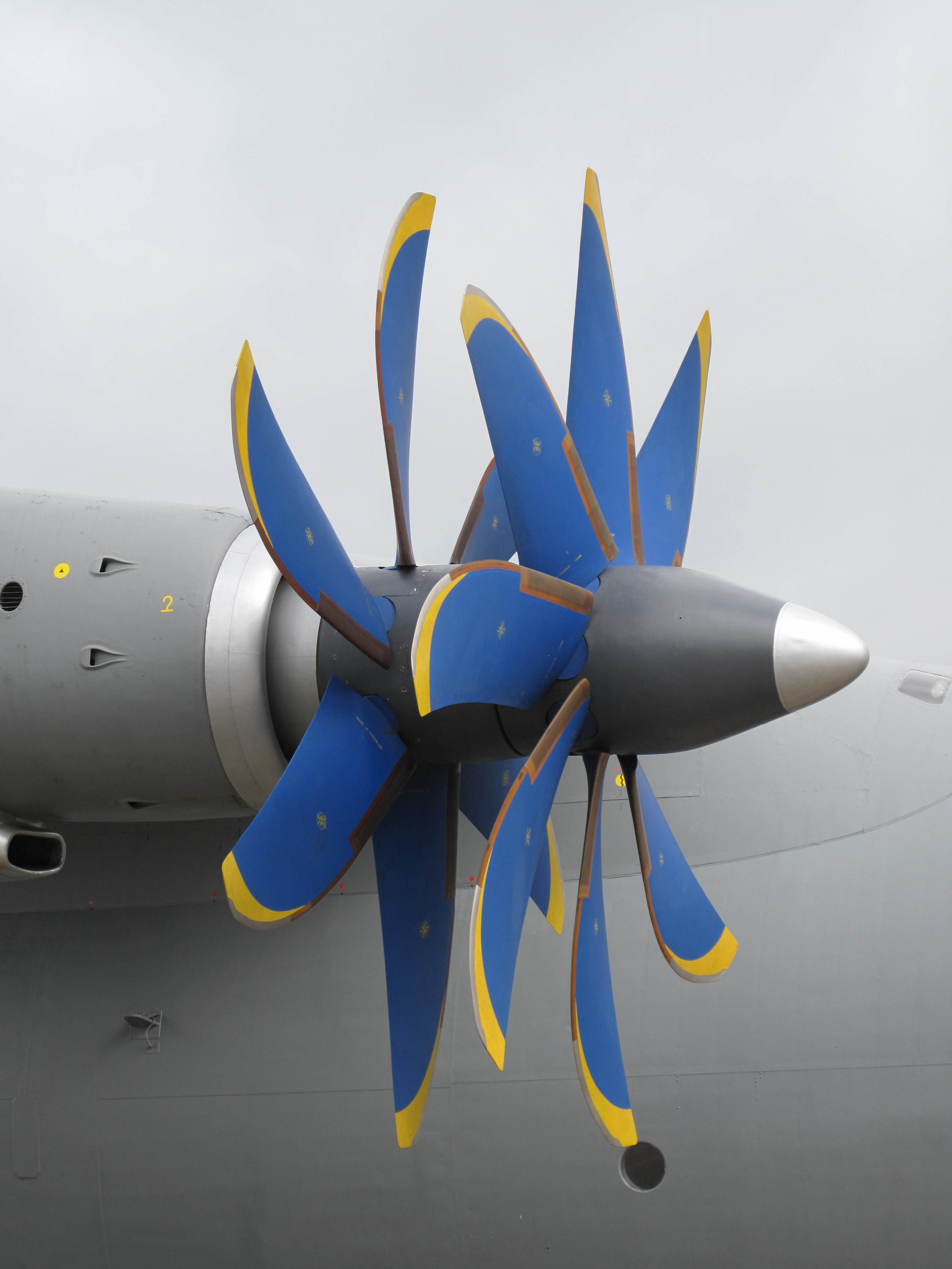
The D-27 propfan

Similar to many aircraft designs of the Soviet Union, the An-70 was designed as an airlifter that could operate from unprepared fields. In short take-off and landing (STOL) configuration, the aircraft could lift off from a 600 m (2,000 ft) dirt strip with 25 tonnes (55,000 lb) of cargo and fly for 3,000 km (1,900 mi). Alternatively, it could fly the same distance with 35 t (77,000 lb) of cargo if it took off from a 1,800 m (5,900 ft) paved runway. For a payload-heavy mission, the An-70 can haul 47 t (104,000 lb) of cargo for a range of 1,500 km (930 mi), but if range was essential, the aircraft can carry a load of 17 t (37,000 lb) over 8,000 km (5,000 mi). In exceptional circumstances, the An-70 subjected to lower-g take-offs, can airlift a 47-tonne (104,000 lb) T-80U main battle tank and fly it for 3,000 km (1,900 mi). The fully pressurised internal cabin measures 4 m (13 ft) wide and 4.1 m (13 ft) high, and has a length of 18.6 m (61 ft) from the front to the ramp; with the ramp included, the total cabin length is 22.4 m (73 ft). In comparison, the turbofan-powered Il-76 has a lower cross-sectional cargo area, but exceeds the An-70 in payload capability and ramp length. The An-70's cargo hold is serviced by four electrical hoists that facilitate autonomous cargo loading. A central floor can be rapidly installed for the accommodation of 300 soldiers or 200 injured personnel over two decks.

Similar to the An-124, the An-70 design makes extensive use of titanium and composites to keep weight to a minimum and increase damage resistance. Approximately 25 percent of the airframe is made of carbon-fibre composites, which are primarily used on control surfaces and the tail assembly, while aluminium and steel alloys are used for the rest of the structure. The An-70 has a designed life of 45,000 hours over 15,000 flights. The prototypes had a fly-by-wire flight-control system that comprised three digital channels and six analog channels; it was expected that production aircraft would have a four-channel digital fly-by-wire system. Aircraft and system information are mainly relayed to the pilot and co-pilot via six large multi-function CRT displays, with secondary electro-mechanical instruments and head-up displays; a flight engineer position is also present on the prototypes.

== Variants ==
Proposed An-112KC variant

An-70T
A version of the An-70 sans suffix adopted for the civilian market.

An-70T-100
A proposed lighter version of the An-70T with two D-27 propfans and simplified landing gear for civilian use. The variant was intended to haul 30 t (66,000 lb) of cargo over a distance of 1,000 km (620 mi), or 20 t (44,000 lb) for 4,300 km (2,700 mi).

An-7X
A proposed version of the An-70 intended for the Western European market.

An-77
Proposed in July 2017 for joint development between the U.S. and Ukraine, this modernized version of the An-70 would fill the gap between the 21-metric-ton payload (23-short-ton) C-130 and the 76-metric-ton payload (84-short-ton) C-17. It could also replace the An-12 and Il-76 military transporters. At the Eurasia Airshow in April 2018, Antonov announced that it would work with Turkey's Turkish Aerospace Industries (TAI) in redeveloping the An-77 aircraft to meet current-day requirements.

An-112KC
A proposed aerial refueling version of the An-70, except with two jet engines from the team of U.S. Aerospace and Antonov for the U.S. Air Force's KC-X program. The USAF rejected the proposal, and the appeal was later dismissed.
An-170
A heavy-lift version with a stretched fuselage and greater wing span. The aircraft would be powered by the Progress D-227, a more powerful derivative of the Progress D-27 producing 16,000–17,000 hp (12,000–13,000 kW) of output.
An-171
Proposed maritime patrol version of An-170.
An-188

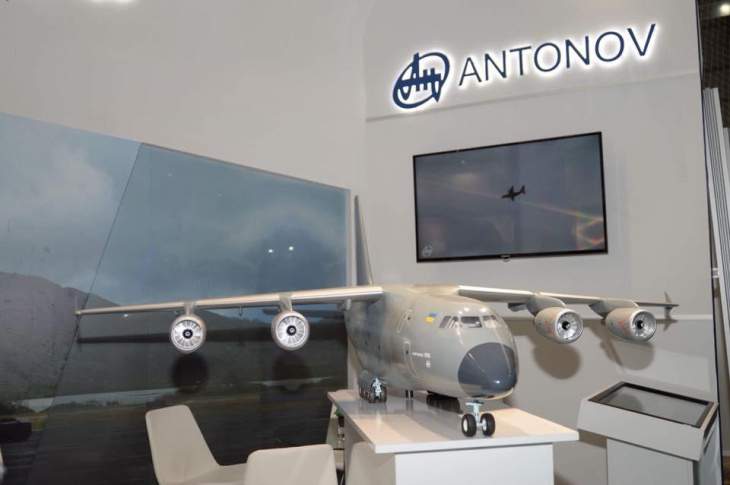
Proposed An-188 variant

A program to develop this variant was launched at the 2015 Paris Air Show. This variant will essentially be a four jet engine powered heavy-medium transport with modernized NATO- compatible western cockpit, slightly enlarged wings, winglets and aerial refueling capabilities. The An-188 is intended to fill the gap between a C-130 and C-17 while being a direct competitor to the A400M. Plans include incorporating a western engine option along with the D-27 to appeal to western markets and reduce dependency on eastern markets. In May 2018, Ukroboronprom announced at the Eurasia-2018 Airshow held in Turkey's Antalya, that Ukraine and Turkey had agreed to jointly implement the production of the aircraft.

== Operators ==
Ukraine

- Ukrainian Air Force – In 2010, two deliveries were expected in 2011 and 2012. Finally, in January 2015, Ukrainian Defence Minister Stepan Poltorak signed an order for the type, allowing the An-70 to officially enter service with the Ukrainian Air Force, currently the sole operator of the type. Satellite imagery in 2024 revealed that one An-70 aircraft was parked near the Polish Air Force Academy in Dęblin, Poland, away from the conflict zone created by the 2022 Russian invasion of Ukraine.

== Specifications (An-70) ==
Data from Butowski, Jane's all the World's Aircraft 2000–2001

General characteristics

- Crew: 3–4 flight crew (two pilots and flight engineer (optional navigator)) + loadmasters and cargo attendants
- Capacity: 300 troops or 206 stretcher cases / 47,000 kg (103,617 lb) max payload
- Length: 40.73 m (133 ft 8 in)
- Wingspan: 44.06 m (144 ft 7 in)
- Height: 16.38 m (53 ft 9 in)
- Airfoil: TsAGI P-202
- Empty weight: 66,230 kg (146,012 lb)
- Max takeoff weight: 145,000 kg (319,670 lb)
- Powerplant: 4 × Progress D-27 propfan, 10,350 kW (13,880 hp) each
- Propellers: 14-bladed Aerosyla Stupino SV-27, 4.5 m (14 ft 9 in) diameter contra-rotating propeller (8-bladed forward; 6-bladed rear)

Performance

- Maximum speed: 780 km/h (480 mph, 420 kn)
- Cruise speed: 750 km/h (470 mph, 400 kn) at 9,100–11,000 m (29,900–36,100 ft)

800 km/h (500 mph; 430 kn) max

- Stall speed: 113 km/h (70 mph, 61 kn)
- Range: 1,350 km (840 mi, 730 nmi) with 47,000 kg (103,617 lb) payload from 1,800 m (5,900 ft) runway

3,800 km (2,400 mi; 2,100 nmi) with 38,000 kg (83,776 lb) payload from 1,800 m (5,900 ft) runway
5,000 km (3,100 mi; 2,700 nmi) with 30,000 kg (66,139 lb) payload from 1,800 m (5,900 ft) runway
7,400 km (4,600 mi; 4,000 nmi) with 20,000 kg (44,092 lb) payload from 1,800 m (5,900 ft) runway
8,000 km (5,000 mi; 4,300 nmi) with maximum fuel from 1,800 m (5,906 ft) runway
(STOL operations with reduced range)

- Service ceiling: 12,000 m (39,000 ft)
- Rate of climb: 24.9 m/s (4,900 ft/min)
- Power/mass: 0.316 kW/kg (0.192 hp/lb) max
- Take-off field length: 1,800 m (5,900 ft)
- Landing field length: 2,000 m (6,600 ft)
- Take-off run STOL 30,000 kg (66,139 lb) payload: 600 m (2,000 ft)
- Take-off run STOL 35,000 kg (77,162 lb) payload: 915 m (3,000 ft)

== See also ==
- Military transport aircraft – Aircraft designed to carry military cargo and personnel

Aircraft of comparable role, configuration, and era

- Ilyushin Il-76 – Russian heavy four-engined military transport jet aircraft (170t MTOW)
- Lockheed C-141 Starlifter – Retired American heavy military transport aircraft from Lockheed (147t MTOW)
- Airbus A400M Atlas – Multi-national four-engine turboprop military transport aircraft (141t MTOW)
- Kawasaki C-2 – Japanese military transport aircraft (141t MTOW)
- Lockheed Martin C-130J Super Hercules – Military transport aircraft (74t MTOW)
