= Segodnya Multimedia Publishing Group =

Segodnya Multimedia Publishing Group was a joint stock company in Ukraine which operated from 1997 to 2022, holding multiple businesses in the publishing industry, including the newspaper Russian-language newspaper Segodnya.

== History ==
Segodnya Multimedia was active in the publishing business from 1997, when the Segodnya newspaper began in Kyiv, initially under Segodnya Publishing Group CJSC. From August 2006, the holding company was headed by Guillermo Schmitt, the paper's editor-in-chief. In 2007, the company became Segodnya Multimedia PJSC and launched the online version of the newspaper, segodnya.ua.

In July 2011, Alyona Gromnitskaya became the general director of the company, leading editors at Segodnya to take industrial action in response to her editorial policy in December. In January 2012, the supervisory board announced its decision to fire editor-in-chief Igor Guzhva, with Gromnitskaya resigning voluntarily. In April 2013, several journalists left the publication, many for the new daily Vesti, which Guzhva had begun publishing. Olga Guk became editor-in-chief of Segodnya, followed by Oles Buzina in 2015.

In September 2019 the company announced it would cease printing its flagship paper, but continue publishing news online, citing the deterioration of the print media market, digitalization and the growing influence of the internet. In 2022, after Ukrainian oligarch Rinat Akhmetov had exited his media assets, the company folded.

Segodnya Publishing Group was a member of the Ukrainian Association of Press Publishers.

== Products ==
The main products of Segodnya Multimedia PrJSC were:

- Newspaper Segodnya
- Web portal segodnya.ua
- Printing plant in Vyshhorod
- Rio Weekly
- Media-Press JSC
- Donetskie Novosti LLC
- Priazovskiy Rabochiy
- Vecherniy Donetsk
- gorod.dp.ua

== Ownership ==
The major owners of Segodnya Multimedia PrJSC were:

- SCM Limited (Cyprus)
- System Capital Management SC
- Media Group Ukraine
