= Alyona Gromnitskaya =

Ukrainian journalist and media manager

- Born: 2 October 1975 (age 50); Kiev
- Occupations: journalist, media-manager, public figure

Alyona Gromnitskaya (Ukrainian: Олена Анатоліївна Громницька; born on 2 October 1975 in Kiev, Ukraine) is a Ukrainian journalist, media-manager, public figure, spokesperson to the President of Ukraine Leonid Kuchma (2002–2005).

== Biography ==
Gromnitskaya was born on 2 October 1975 in Kiev. She graduated from the Historic Dept of National Pedagogical Dragomanov University in 1997 and a Postgraduate Degree in Constitutional law in National Pedagogical Dragomanov University in 2004. Gromnitskaya started her professional career in 1995, holding the office of special correspondent in "UTAR" TV company. After that, she worked for "Rada" – Parliamentary Radio and Television Channel, ICTV Channel, Presidential Administration of Ukraine, Media-Dom LLC, Republican Party of Ukraine, Ministry for Fuels and Energy of Ukraine, socio-political newspaper "Profile-Ukraine". She occupied a position of vice-president of "Glavred-Media" Holding since August 2010.

== Professional activity ==
- In 2002–2005 worked as a spokesperson of president of Ukraine Leonid Kuchma.
- In 2007 she was appointed as a project leader and chief editor in "Profile-Ukraine" newspaper. Publishing rights of this newspaper belonged to Ukrainian businessman Alexander Tretyakov.
- In 2008, "Profile" won a Newspaper of the Year-2008 prize.
- In 2010–2011 she was both a chief editor of "Profile" and vice-president of "Glavred-Media" Holding.
- In 2011 she was appointed as a chief executive officer of Segodnya Multimedia Publishing Group, a part of SCM Holding. She voluntarily retired from this post after a public scandal with the chief editor of Ukrainian newspaper Segodnya. Even after that, SCM holding expressed regret for Alena's resignation, telling, that under her leadership "our holding has shown sustained and positive dynamics of growth of economic performance". In response, Gromnitskaya has told, that: «The only thing that’s important to me, is protecting the interests of a company, and that’s why I retired voluntarily – to make a point in a pointless scandal».
- Since April 2012 – founder of a consulting agency "Ukrainian Media Development Institute" (UMDI). UMDI was a communicational partner of a 64th Worldwide Newspaper Congress and 19th Worldwide Editors' Forum WAN-IFRA.
- In 2016 she created an internet-project, named "Realist.Online", which was launched in the end of August 2016.

== Awards ==
- In 2004 she received a title of "Honored Journalist of Ukraine".
- In 2011 she received a 3rd class Order of Princess Olha.
- In 2007 she was placed 46th in Forbes list of the most influential women of Ukraine. In 2011, by the same Focus rating, she was placed 62nd.

== Public activity ==
Gromnitskaya writes poetry. She is an author of a collection of poems, named "Polutona" (eng. "Semitones").

== See also ==
- Segodnya
