= Media Group Ukraine =

Ukrainian media holding company

- Type: Private
- Industry: Mass media
- Founded: August 2, 2010
- Defunct: July 22, 2022
- Headquarters: Kyiv, Ukraine
- Key people: Yevgeniy Bondarenko (CEO)
- Products: Television, broadcasting, advertisement production
- Website: mgukraine.com/en/

Media Group Ukraine (Ukrainian: Медіа Група «Україна») was a media holding company that manages System Capital Management Group's television and new media projects. The holding company is a professional investor in Ukrainian media business. Media Group Ukraine was one of the largest media holding companies in Ukraine.

In July 11, 2022, it was announced that Rinat Akhmetov (sole owner of the media group) had left the media business. It was announced that Media Group Ukraine plans to give up all broadcast and satellite television licenses and print media licenses in Ukraine in favor of the state, as well as the termination of online media. Akhmetov explained the decision by citing Ukraine's new law on oligarchs, though insisted that he "was not, am not and will not be an oligarch." However, Forbes Ukraine reported that the Media Group Ukraine cost $100-150 million USD per year, thus it was not profitable business and Akhmetov decided to cut costs during the ongoing war with Russia. On 21 July, 2022, the National Council of Ukraine for Television and Radio canceled the licenses of the eight TV channels of Media Group Ukraine.

== Subsidiaries ==
The company was established in 2010 and included:

- Ukraine, a national FTA TV channel
- entertaining youth TV channel NLO TV
- News channel Україна 24
- thematic TV channels Football 1, Football 2, Football 3
- regional TV channel Channel 34
- Digital Screens (video-on-demand platform OLL.TV)
- Tele Pro (a production company)
- Mediapartnerstvo Media Agency
- Segodnya Multimedia Publishing Group

Media Group Ukraine' channels its principal investments into development and promotion of existing business areas and technologies and into new, prospective projects.
