= Oleg Kalashnikov =

Ukrainian politician (1962–2015)

- Олег Калашніков
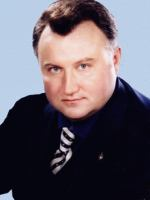

Member of the Verkhovna Rada
- In office 25 May 2006 – 23 November 2007

Personal details
- Born: Oleh Ivanovych Kalashnikov; 6 November 1962 Rivne, Ukrainian SSR, Soviet Union
- Died: 14 April 2015 (aged 52) Kyiv, Ukraine
- Party: Party of Regions

Oleh Ivanovych Kalashnikov (Ukrainian: Оле́г Іва́нович Кала́шніков; 6 November 1962 – 15 April 2015) was a Ukrainian politician, born in Rivne, Ukrainian SSR. He was a member of the Party of Regions, Verkhovna Rada of Ukraine of V convocation.

== Early life ==
Kalashnikov was born on 6 November 1962 in Rivne, which was then part of the Ukrainian SSR in the Soviet Union. From 1978 to 1980 he studied at the Suvorov Military School in Kalinin. Afterwards, he attended the Kyiv Higher Combined Arms Command School named after M. Frunze, graduating in 1984 with a specialization in military reconnaissance. He also later received the specialty of referent-translator to the Chinese language. Upon graduating, he served within the Armed Forces of the USSR, and, upon the collapse of the Soviet Union, the Armed Forces of Ukraine. During this time, according to later interviews he conducted, he participated in the Soviet response to the Chernobyl disaster. In 1997, he retired with the rank of colonel, and then became head of the organization "General Military Union of Ukraine" and in 2002 co-chair of the civic forum "Statehood".

During the 2006 Ukrainian parliamentary election, he was elected to the Verkhovna Rada as candidate no. 161 on the Party of Regions list. In the parliament, he served on the Committee on National Security and Defense. When the parliament was dissolved early by Viktor Yushchenko, his mandate ended, as the Party of Regions decided not to include him on their electoral list due to the controversy surrounding the STB incident. During the 2012 Ukrainian parliamentary election, he attempted to run again but this time for the single-mandate district no. 218 (within Kyiv) again under the Party of Regions, but lost to Volodymyr Ariev of Batkivshchyna.

== Controversies ==
On 12 July 2006 a group of individuals from the Party of Regions, including Oleh Kalashnikov, obstructed the work of an STB television crew near the Verkhovna Rada. The group forcibly took away a tape from the STB crew, and the journalists were physically assaulted. Two days later, on 14 July, the Prosecutor's Office of the Pecherskyi District of Kyiv initiated a criminal case on the grounds of obstruction of journalists' legitimate professional activities. As a response to the incident, the Verkhovna Rada established a Temporary Investigation Commission to examine the situation. On 19 December 2006 the Temporary Investigation Commission released a report, in which it condemned Kalashnikov's behavior as unacceptable.

After leaving politics, Kalashnikov re‑emerged publicly in 2011 during the trial of Yulia Tymoshenko, when he organized a counter‑protest through the General Military Union of Ukraine outside the Pecherskyi District Court. In 2013, he and Vadym Kolesnichenko organize an “Anti‑Fascist Forum” in Kyiv, and he later became an active participant in the Antimaidan demonstrations in Mariinsky Park. During this period, opposition figures accused him of bringing titushky to Kyiv and of coordinating paid pro‑government rallies; these accusations led to an on‑air confrontation with Arsen Avakov in January 2014. In March 2014, MP Olha Chervakova requested that the Prosecutor General’s Office and the Security Service of Ukraine investigate his possible involvement in organizing titushky during Euromaidan, and by the time of his death the Prosecutor General’s Office had opened an inquiry into alleged offenses against protesters.

== Assassination ==
On 15 April 2015 he was shot to death on the stairwall of his apartment building on Prospekt Pravdy in the neighbourhood of Vynohradar within Kyiv. He was found at about 20:00 by his wife, who called the police. According to Anton Herashchenko, investigators were at the time considering several possible motives, including his political activities, personal conflicts, his business interests and debts, and the possibility of a failed robbery. On 16 April Ukrainian journalist Oles Buzina was shot to death in Kyiv as well.

A Ukrainian nationalist group calling itself Ukrainian Insurgent Army allegedly claimed responsibility for these and other murders in an email containing "grammatical mistakes not typical for a native Ukrainian speaker". The authenticity of the claim was questioned by the Ukrainian government as well as the very existence of the named group.
