= Ukrainian Association of Press Publishers =

Voluntary non-profit organization

Logo

The Ukrainian Association of Press Publishers (UAPP; Ukrainian: Українська асоціація видавців періодичної преси, romanized: Ukrayinska asotsiatsiya vydavtsiv periodychnoyi presi) is a voluntary non-governmental and non-profit organization of the publishers of periodic press – periodic print publications (newspapers and magazines).

UAPP announced its foundation in March 2001, at the meeting of an initiative group of publishers of more than thirty independent newspapers, held in Zaporizhia. UAPP was officially registered in July, 2001. Today the Ukrainian Association of Press Publishers unite 111 publishing houses from all the regions (oblast) of Ukraine.

The chief governing body of the Association is the General Assembly, which elects the President of the Association and the Board of Directors.

The Ukrainian Association of Press Publishers is the first independent union of publishers in Ukraine, which declared its commitment to advocacy and support of publishing business. The mission of UAPP is to unite publishers of newspapers and magazines in order to create newspaper market based on civilized principles and develop the publishing business by lobbying the common interest and qualified service for every member of Association.

Along with the Independent Regional Publishers of Ukraine (IRPU), UAPP represents Ukraine at the WAN (World Association of Newspapers).

Presidents of the Association:
2001 - 2004(?) Michael Veisberg
2004(?) - 2009(?) Boris Lozhkin
02.2009 until now: Oleksandr Antonets
