= Law on Oligarchs (Ukraine) =

2021 anti-oligarch bill

The Law on Oligarchs, also known as De-oligarchization, is a 2021 law initiated by Ukrainian president Volodymyr Zelenskyy directed against the influence of Ukrainian oligarchs on political processes. It received the corresponding name after the registration of the bill "On the Prevention of Threats to National Security Related to the Excessive Influence of Persons who have Significant Economic or Political Weight in Public Life (Oligarchs)" (Reg. No. 5599).

== Key purpose ==
The law on oligarchs is designed to create a special register of persons depending on their level of wealth and involvement in social and political processes in the country.

According to the bill, the basis for the inclusion of oligarchs in the register will be decided by the National Security and Defense Council (NSDC). Then–NSDC secretary Oleksiy Danilov said in May 2021 that there were 13 people who could be classified as oligarchs.

According to the bill, any three of the four conditions are sufficient for the NSDC to include a person into a register of oligarchs:

- excessive influence on the media;
- participation in political life;
- beneficial ownership of a monopoly company;
- a fortune of over 1 million living wages (about $83 million at the current exchange rate).

Persons included in the register will be banned from making contributions, either directly or indirectly through other persons, in support of political parties, and being a buyer, or beneficiaries of the buyers, in the process of privatization of large-scale privatization objects.

== Consideration of the bill in the Parliament ==
The Verkhovna Rada passed the first reading of president's bill No. 5599 on oligarchs on July 1, 2021. A total of 275 MPs voted in favor of the bill at an extraordinary plenary session of the parliament.

In the second reading and in general, the Verkhovna Rada adopted the Law on September 23, 2021, with 279 lawmakers voting in favor.

The Chairman of the Verkhovna Rada of Ukraine Dmytro Razumkov said that the Rada's rules of procedure had been violated during the voting process. Razumkov said that the people who proposed a "special procedure" for the bill's consideration had misled Rada deputies, but had not voted for the procedure themselves because they understood they would be held responsible. Moreover, according to him, the "hasty adoption" of the anti-oligarchs law led to inconsistencies in the document. Razumkov said that he would vote for the law, as his amendment had been "taken into account".

== Request to the Venice Commission ==
Chairman of the Verkhovna Rada of Ukraine Dmytro Razumkov submitted bill No. 5599 on oligarchs for review to the European Commission for Democracy through Law (Venice Commission) on September 10, 2021. This was done in accordance with the demands of the Ombudsman and four out of five opposition factions in the Parliament. This was opposed by Zelenskyy's Servant of the People party, which Razumkov had been a founding member of, leading to conflict between Razumkov, Zelenskyy and the party, and contributing to Razumkov's later dismissal as chairman by a parliamentary vote.

On September 15, 2021, the Venice Commission confirmed the existence of an appeal from Ukraine regarding this bill. The Venice Commission was expected to present its conclusion to the draft law, including its observance of human rights, by December 15, 2021.

In June 2023, the Venice Commission released its opinion. The Commission said that it "firmly supports the goal of fighting oligarchic influence", but emphasised that de-oligarchisation was a "very complex issue" and the method chosen to achieve it was of "decisive importance". It distinguished between the "systemic" and "personal" approaches to fighting oligarchy, and said the law focused on the latter and was potentially vulnerable to political misuse. It recommended that Ukraine defer the law's implementation until after the end of the Russo-Ukrainian war, and commented that the full-scale Russian invasion had already reduced oligarchs' influence because many of their businesses had been destroyed. In August 2023, then–NSDC secretary Oleksiy Danilov said that no one had been added to the register yet, due to difficulties assessing assets during wartime. In September 2023, Ukraine postponed the creation of the oligarch register until three months after the end of martial law.

== Criticism of the bill ==
Then–Verkhovna Rada Commissioner for Human Rights Liudmyla Denisova said that the bill's provisions did not comply with the Constitution of Ukraine, and their implementation would lead to violations of human and civil rights and freedoms. She called for the bill to be sent to the Venice Commission for its review before the second reading, and said that if the version of the bill adopted at its first reading was adopted, she would have to submit it to the Constitutional Court of Ukraine.

Fareed Zakaria, a journalist, political commentator, and the host of CNN's weekly public affairs show said that the bill on oligarchs created risks for freedom of speech in Ukraine.

Swedish economist Anders Åslund also expressed concerns and likened the move to Vladimir Putin's actions in the early 2000s, when media assets were taken from oligarchs and given to more loyal figures.

British historian Niall Ferguson called Zelenskyy's bill a "dangerous precedent", as it attempted to create exceptional laws targeting specific social groups.

== Impact ==
Following the law's adoption, Rinat Akhmetov relinquished licenses for his media group, and Petro Poroshenko sold his television stations to former and current employees; Vadym Novynskyi withdrew as a member of parliament. Ruslan Stefanchuk, Razumkov's successor as Chairman of the Verkhovna Rada, cited oligarchs' sale of their assets as proof that the law was effective although it had not yet been implemented.

In its June 2023 opinion, the Venice Commission wrote that the 2022 Russian invasion of Ukraine, the effects of martial law, as well as "the measures taken by persons who could potentially be designated as 'oligarchs' to not fall under the eligibility criteria of the Law", appeared to have "reduced the power and influence of 'oligarchs' considerably".
